= Dusty Springfield discography =

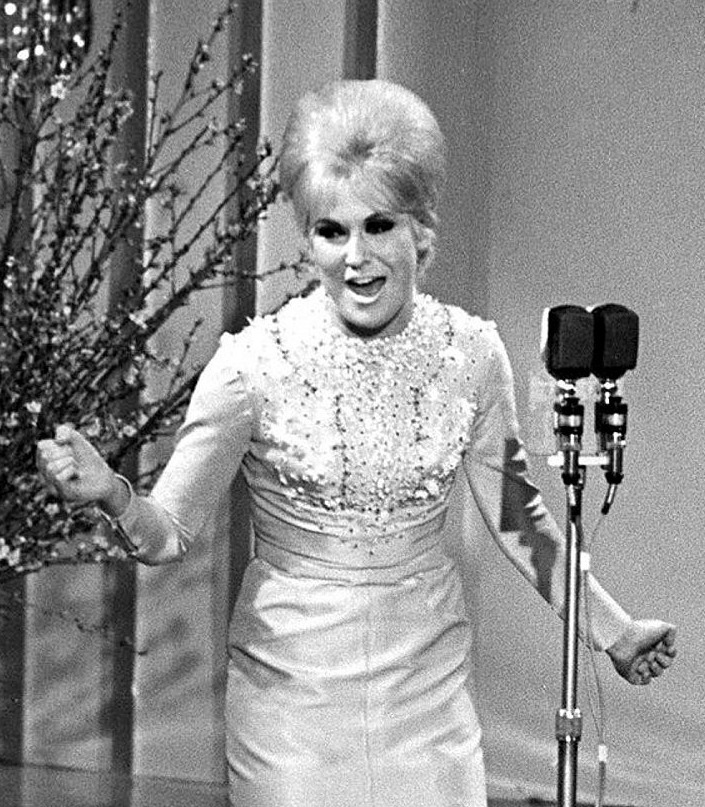
- Springfield performing at the 1965 Sanremo Music Festival
- Studio albums: 21
- Extended plays: 4
- Live albums: 1
- Compilation albums: 35
- Singles: 69

The discography of English pop singer Dusty Springfield includes 21 studio albums, one live album, 30 compilations, four extended plays, and 69 singles. Some of her albums and singles were unreleased, most notably 1974's Longing. Additionally, many of her early American album releases were released by the American arm of Philips Records, using material recorded in England and America with US and UK single releases included and re-ordered. Thus, these album releases were often collections of her recordings that were not intended by Springfield to have been released as proper albums at all. From 1969–2015, her albums were released simultaneously in the US and the UK, though occasionally with different names and artwork, but the same track listings. Only 1968's Dusty... Definitely and 1972's See All Her Faces (both released only in the UK) and 1982's White Heat (released only in the US) deviated from that format.

== Albums ==
=== Studio albums ===
Title	Year	Peak chart positions						Sales	Certifications
Title	Year	UK	US	CAN	GER	NL	SWE	Sales	Certifications
A Girl Called Dusty	Released: April 1964 (UK); Label: Philips	6	—	—	—	—	—		
Stay Awhile/I Only Want to Be with You	Released: June 1964 (US); Label: Philips	—	62	—	—	—	—		
Dusty	Released: October 1964 (US); Label: Philips	—	136	—	—	—	—		
Ooooooweeee!!!	Released: March 1965 (US); Label: Philips	—	—	—	—	—	—		
Ev'rything's Coming Up Dusty	Released: October 1965 (UK); Label: Philips	6	—	—	—	—	—	UK: 60,000	
You Don't Have to Say You Love Me	Released: July 1966 (US); Label: Philips	—	77	—	—	—	—		
Where Am I Going?	Released: October 1967 (UK); Label: Philips	40	—	—	—	—	—		
The Look of Love	Released: December 1967 (US); Label: Philips	—	135	—	—	—	—		
Dusty... Definitely	Released: November 1968 (UK); Label: Atlantic, Philips	30	—	—	—	—	—		
Dusty in Memphis	Released: January 1969 (US), April 1969 (UK); Label: Atlantic, Philips	—	99	—	—	—	—		
A Brand New Me / From Dusty With Love	Released: January 1970 (US), April 1970 (UK); Label: Atlantic, Philips	35	107	64	—	—	—		
See All Her Faces	Released: November 1972 (UK); Label: Philips	—	—	—	—	—	—		
Cameo	Released: February 1973 (US), May 1973 (UK); Label: ABC Dunhill, Philips	—	—	—	—	—	—		
It Begins Again	Released: February 1978; Label: Mercury, United Artists	41	—	—	—	—	—	UK: 50,000	
Living Without Your Love	Released: January 1979 (US), March 1979 (UK); Label: Mercury, United Artists	—	—	—	—	—	—		
White Heat	Released: December 1982 (US, CAN); Label: Casablanca	—	—	—	—	—	—		
Reputation	Released: June 1990; Label: Parlophone	18	—	—	21	59	28		BPI: Gold
A Very Fine Love	Released: June 1995; Label: Columbia	43	—	—	—	—	—		
Faithful	Released: April 2015; Label: Real Gone Music	—	—	—	—	—	—		
Longing	Released: June 2025; Label: Real Gone Music	—	—	—	—	—	—		

=== Live albums ===
Title	Year	Certification
Live at the Royal Albert Hall	Released: October 2005; Label: Eagle	ARIA: Platinum (DVD)

=== Select compilation albums ===
- Dusty Springfield has released numerous compilations; both official and unofficial. Below is a list of those that have charted on a national chart.

Title	Year	Peak chart positions						Certification
Title	Year	UK	US	AUS	NL	NOR	NZ	Certification
Dusty Springfield's Golden Hits	Released: 1966; Label: Philips	2	137	—	—	—	—	
Dusty Springfield Gold	Released: 1980; Label: Impact	—	—	82	—	—	—	
Dusty Springfield & Petula Clark	Released: 1982; Label: Hammard	—	—	36	—	—	—	
Dusty – The Silver Collection	Released: 1988; Label: Philips	14	—	—	—	—	—	BPI: Gold; ARIA: Platinum
The Dusty Springfield Collection	Released: 1990; Label: Phonogram	—	—	—	29	—	—	
Goin' Back – The Very Best Of	Released: 1994; Label: Philips	5	—	—	—	—	16	BPI: Gold
Hits Collection	Released: 1997; Label:	—	—	—	—	—	—	BPI: 2× Platinum
The Very Best of Dusty Springfield	Released: 1998; Label: Mercury	—	—	—	—	—	—	
Dusty: The Very Best of Dusty Springfield	Released: 1998; Label: Mercury, Philips	19	—	91	—	—	8	
Dusty: The Original Pop Diva	Released: 2006; Label: Universal Music Australia	—	—	71	—	—	—	
At Her Very Best	Released: 2006; Label: Mercury	31	—	—	—	16	8	BPI: Silver
Just Dusty	Released: 2009; Label: Universal Music TV	18	—	—	—	—	—	BPI: Silver
The Opus Collection	Released: 2014; Label: Starbucks	—	96	—	—	—	—	

== Extended plays ==
- I Only Want to Be with You (Philips, March 1964) UK #8
- Dusty (Philips, September 1964) UK #3
- Dusty in New York (Philips, May 1965) UK #13
- Mademoiselle Dusty (Philips, July 1965) UK #17
- If You Go Away (Philips, August 1968)

Note: The above chart placements are from the UK EP chart. The EP chart, which was separate from the singles chart and album chart, ran from 1960 to 1967.

== Singles ==
=== 1960s ===
Year	Title	Peak chart positions							Sales	Certifications	Album
Year	Title	UK	US	AUS	CAN	GER	IRL	NL	Sales	Certifications	Album
1963	"I Only Want to Be with You" b/w "Once Upon a Time"	4	12	6	21	—	7			BPI: Silver	Stay Awhile/I Only Want to Be with You
1964	"Stay Awhile" b/w "Something Special"	13	38	27	—	—	—	—			Stay Awhile/I Only Want to Be with You
1964	"Wishin' and Hopin' " b/w "Do Re Mi"	—	6	2	2	—	—	—			Stay Awhile/I Only Want to Be with You
1964	"All Cried Out" b/w "I Wish I'd Never Loved You"	—	41	55	23	—	—	—			Dusty
1964	"I Just Don't Know What to Do with Myself" b/w "My Colouring Book"	3	—	16	—	—	5	—			Dusty
1964	"Live It Up" b/w "Guess Who?"	—	128	—	—	—	—	—			Dusty
1964	"Losing You" b/w "Summer is Over"(UK), "Here She Comes" (US)	9	91	83	36	—	—	—			Ooooooweeee
1965	"Your Hurtin' Kinda Love" b/w "Don't Say It Baby" (UK) "I Just Don't Know What to Do with Myself" (US)	37	—	—	—	—	—	—			Ooooooweeee
1965	"In the Middle of Nowhere" b/w "Baby Don't You Know"	8	108	56	—	—	8	—			Dusty Springfield's Golden Hits
1965	"Some of Your Lovin'" b/w "I'll Love You for a While" (UK) "I Just Don't Know What to Do with Myself" (US)	8	—	88	—	—	—	—			Non-album single
1966	"Little by Little" b/w "If It Hadn't Been for You"	17	—	—	—	—	—	98			You Don't Have to Say You Love Me
1966	"You Don't Have to Say You Love Me" b/w "Every Ounce of Strength" (UK), "Little by Little" (US)	1	4	2	4	33	4	33	JPN: 250,000	BPI: Silver	You Don't Have to Say You Love Me
1966	"Goin' Back" "I'm Gonna Leave You"	10	—	9	—	—	—	—			Non-album single
1966	"All I See Is You" b/w "Go Ahead On" (UK), "I'm Gonna Leave You" (US)	9	20	31	15	—	—	—			Dusty Springfield's Golden Hits
1967	"I'll Try Anything" b/w "The Corrupt Ones"	13	40	38	19	—	—	—			Non-album single
1967	"Give Me Time"	24	76	—	66	—	—	—			The Look of Love
1967	"The Look of Love"	—	22	—	26	—	—	—			The Look of Love
1967	"What's It Gonna Be?" b/w "Small Town Girl"	—	49	45	40	—	—	—			The Look of Love
1968	"Sweet Ride" b/w "No Stranger Am I"	—	—	—	—	—	—	—			Non-album single
1968	"I Close My Eyes and Count to Ten" b/w "No Stranger Am I" (UK), "La Bamba" (US)	4	122	67	—	40	6	—			Non-album single
1968	"I Will Come to You" b/w "The Colour of Your Eyes"	—	—	69	—	—	—	—			Non-album single
1968	"Son of a Preacher Man" b/w "Just a Little Lovin' (Early in the Morning)"	9	10	6	11	38	11	4		BPI: 2× Platinum; BVMI: Gold	Dusty in Memphis
1969	"Don't Forget About Me"	—	64	—	51	—	—	—			Dusty in Memphis
1969	"Breakfast in Bed"	—	91	—	—	—	—	—			Dusty in Memphis
1969	"The Windmills of Your Mind"	—	31	40	21	—	—	—			Dusty in Memphis
1969	"I Don't Want to Hear It Anymore"	—	105	59	51	—	—	_			Dusty in Memphis
1969	"Willie & Laura Mae Jones" b/w "That Old Sweet Roll (Hi-De-Ho)"	—	78	—	57	—	—	—			See All Her Faces
1969	"Am I the Same Girl?" b/w "Earthbound Gypsy"	43	—	75	—	—	—	—			Non-album single
1969	"In the Land of Make Believe" b/w "So Much Love"	—	113	—	—	—	—	—			Dusty In Memphis
1969	"Brand New Me" b/w "Bad Case of the Blues"	—	24	80	25	—	—	—			A Brand New Me

=== 1970s ===
Year	Title	Peak chart positions							Certifications	Album
Year	Title	UK	US	AUS	CAN	GER	IRL	NL	Certifications	Album
1970	"Silly, Silly Fool" b/w "Joe"	—	76	—	57	—	—	—		A Brand New Me
1970	"Morning Please Don't Come" (with Tom Springfield) b/w "Charley" (by Tom Springfield)	—	—	—	—	—	—	—		Non-album single
1970	"I Wanna Be a Free Girl" b/w "Let Me in Your Way"	—	— (Note: "I Wanna Be a Free Girl" did not enter the Billboard Hot 100, but it peaked at #25 on the Billboard Adult Contemporary chart.)	—	—	—	—	—		A Brand New Me
1970	"How Can I Be Sure?" b/w "Spooky"	36	—	25	—	—	—	—	BPI: Gold (for "Spooky")	Non-album single
1970	"Lost" b/w "Never Love Again"	—	—	—	—	—	—	—		A Brand New Me
1971	"What Good Is I Love You?" b/w "What Do You Do When Love Dies"	—	—	36	—	—	72	—		See All Her Faces
1971	"Haunted" b/w "Nothing Is Forever"	—	—	—	—	—	—	—		Faithful
1971	"I Believe in You" b/w "Someone Who Cares"	—	—	—	—	—	—	—		Faithful
1972	"Yesterday When I Was Young" b/w "I Start Counting"	—	—	—	—	—	—	—		See All Her Faces
1973	"Who Gets Your Love" b/w "Of All the Things"	—	—	—	—	—	—	—		Cameo
1973	"Mama's Little Girl"	—	— (Note: "Mama's Little Girl" did not enter the Billboard Hot 100, but it peaked at #33 on the Billboard Adult Contemporary chart.)	—	—	—	—	—		Cameo
1973	"Learn to Say Goodbye"	—	— (Note: "Learn to Say Goodbye" did not enter the Billboard Hot 100, but it peaked at #33 on the Billboard Adult Contemporary chart.)	—	—	—	—	—		Cameo
1977	"Let Me Love You Once Before You Go" b/w "I'm Your Child"	—	110	—	—	—	—	—		Non-album single
1978	"A Love Like Yours" b/w "Hollywood Movie Girls"	—	—	—	—	—	—	—		It Begins Again
1978	"That's the Kind of Love I've Got for You" b/w "Sandra"	—	— (Note: "That's the Kind of Love I've Got for You" did not enter the Billboard Hot 100, but it peaked at #31 on the Billboard Dance Club Songs chart.)	—	—	—	—	—		It Begins Again
1978	"Give Me the Night" b/w "Checkmate"	—	—	—	—	—	—	—		Non-album single
1979	"I'm Coming Home Again" b/w "Save Me, Save Me"	—	—	—	—	—	—	—		Living Without Your Love
1979	"Living Without Your Love" b/w "Get Yourself to Love"	—	—	—	—	—	—	—		Living Without Your Love
1979	"Baby Blue" b/w "Get Yourself to Love"	61	—	—	—	—	—	—		Non-album single

=== 1980s–2000s ===
Year	Title	Peak chart positions								Album
Year	Title	UK	US	US AC	AUS	CAN	GER	IRL	NL	Album
1980	"Your Love Still Brings Me to My Knees" b/w "I'm Your Child"	—	—	—	—	—	—	—	—	Non-album single
1980	"It Goes Like It Goes" b/w "I Wish That Love Would Last"	—	—	—	—	—	—	—	—	Non-album single
1982	"Donnez-Moi (Give It to Me)" b/w "I Am Curious"	—	—	—	—	—	—	—	—	White Heat
1984	"Private Number" (with Spencer Davis) b/w "Don't Want You No More" (Spencer Davis)	—	—	—	—	—	—	—	—	Non-album single
1985	"Sometimes Like Butterflies" b/w "I Wanna Control You"	83	—	—	—	—	—	—	—	Non-album single
1987	"Something in Your Eyes" (with Richard Carpenter) b/w "Time" (Richard Carpenter)	84	—	12	—	—	—	—	—	Time
1987	"What Have I Done to Deserve This?" (with Pet Shop Boys) b/w "A New Life" (Pet Shop Boys)	2	2	14	22	3	4	1	2	Actually
1988	"As Long as We Got Each Other" (with B.J. Thomas)	—	—	7	—	—	—	—	—	Midnight Minute
1988	"I Only Want to Be with You" (re-release) b/w "Breakfast in Bed"	83	—	—	—	—	—	—	—	The Silver Collection
1989	"Nothing Has Been Proved"	16	—	—	145	—	52	10	26	Reputation
1989	"In Private"	14	—	—	136	—	4	13	8	Reputation
1990	"Reputation"	38	—	—	164	—	29	—	44	Reputation
1990	"Arrested by You"	70	—	—	—	—	—	—	—	Reputation
1993	"Heart and Soul" (with Cilla Black) b/w "A Dream Come True" (Cilla Black)	75	—	—	—	—	—	—	—	Non-album single
1994	"Goin Back"(re-release) b/w "Son of a Preacher Man"	76	—	—	—	—	—	—	—	Goin' Back – The Very Best Of
1995	"Wherever Would I Be" (with Daryl Hall)	44	—	—	—	—	73	—	—	A Very Fine Love
1995	"Roll Away"	68	—	—	—	—	—	—	—	A Very Fine Love
2008	"I Just Fall in Love Again" (with Anne Murray)	—	—	—	—	—	—	—	—	Duets: Friends & Legends
