= The Very Best of Dusty Springfield =

Compilation album by Dusty Springfield
- Released: 21 April 1998
- Genre: Pop
- Length: 55:34
- Label: Mercury
- Producer: Bas Hartong (compilation producer)

Dusty Springfield chronology
Hits Collection (1997)	The Very Best of Dusty Springfield (1998)	Dusty in London – Lost British Recordings (1999)

The Very Best of Dusty Springfield is a compilation album by Dusty Springfield, released by Mercury Records on 21 April 1998.

== Critical reception ==
Professional ratings
Review scores
Source	Rating
AllMusic	5/5 stars
Robert Christgau	A−

William Ruhlmann of AllMusic writes, "The result, in terms of song selection, is an excellent 20-song, 57-minute disc that includes most of her best-known material." His major gripe was the song order as laid out by the producer. It was not in order of release and mixed up stereo and mono tracks, which he thought was unnecessary and distracting to the listener.

Robert Christgau gives the compilation an A−.

== Track listing ==
The Very Best of Dusty Springfield track listing
No.	Title	Writer(s)	Original album	Length
1.	"I Only Want to Be with You"	Ivor Raymonde; Michael Hawker	Stay Awhile/I Only Want to Be with You (1964)	2:34
2.	"Wishin' and Hopin'"	Burt Bacharach; Hal David	Stay Awhile/I Only Want to Be with You	2:53
3.	"You Don't Have to Say You Love Me"	Simon Napier-Bell; Pino Donaggio; Vicki Wickham; Vito Pallavicini	You Don't Have to Say You Love Me (1966)	2:47
4.	"Stay Awhile"	Ivor Raymonde; Michael Hawker	Stay Awhile/I Only Want to Be with You	1:55
5.	"Son of a Preacher Man"	John Hurley; Ronnie Wilkins	Dusty in Memphis (1969)	2:24
6.	"I Just Don't Know What to Do with Myself"	Burt Bacharach; Hal David	Dusty (1964)	2:59
7.	"What's It Gonna Be"	Mort Shuman; Jerry Ragavoy	The Look of Love	2:10
8.	"All Cried Out"	Buddy Kaye; Philip Springer	Dusty	3:01
9.	"In the Middle of Nowhere"	Buddy Kaye; Beatrice Verdi	Dusty Springfield's Golden Hits (1966)	2:45
10.	"All I See Is You"	Ben Weisman; Clive Westlake	Dusty Springfield's Golden Hits	3:20
11.	"The Look of Love"	Burt Bacharach; Hal David	The Look of Love	3:32
12.	"Little by Little"	Buddy Kaye; Beatrice Verdi; Eddie Gin	You Don't Have to Say You Love Me	2:16
13.	"I Close My Eyes and Count to Ten"	Clive Westlake	UK single Philips BF 1682 (1968)	3:07
14.	"Some of Your Lovin'"	Carole King; Gerry Goffin	UK single Philips BF 1430 (1965)	2:58
15.	"I'll Try Anything"	Victor Millrose; Mark Barkan	UK single Philips BF 1553 (1967)	2:29
16.	"Losing You"	Tom Springfield; Clive Westlake	Ooooooweeee!!! (1965)	2:58
17.	"Guess Who?"	Gary Klein; Artie Kornfeld	Dusty	2:30
18.	"A Brand New Me"	Jerry Butler; Kenny Gamble; Thom Bell	A Brand New Me (1970)	2:23
19.	"Give Me Time"	Peter Callander; Pietro Melfa; Amadeo Tommasi; Alberto Marina	The Look of Love	3:05
20.	"Goin' Back"	Carole King; Gerry Goffin	Dusty Springfield's Golden Hits	3:28
Total length:				55:34

Track information and credits adapted from the album's liner notes.
