= Dusty (Dusty Springfield album) =

Studio album by Dusty Springfield
- Released: October 1964
- Recorded: January – September 1964
- Studios: Philips (London, UK); New York City
- Genre: Pop
- Length: 34:01
- Labels: Philips (US); PHM 200-156 (mono); PHS 600-156 (stereo)
- Producers: Johnny Franz, Shelby Singleton Jr.

Dusty Springfield US albums 1964–1967 chronology
Stay Awhile/I Only Want to Be with You (1964)	Dusty (1964)	Ooooooweeee!!! (1965)

Singles from Dusty
- 1. "All Cried Out" Released: 1964; 2. "I Just Don't Know What to Do with Myself" Released: 1964; 3. "Guess Who?" Released: 1964; 4. "Live It Up" Released: 1964

Professional ratings
Review scores
Source	Rating
AllMusic	3/5 stars

Dusty is the second album of singer Dusty Springfield to be released in the US. It was issued on the Philips Records label in 1964 and includes Springfield's hit singles "All Cried Out", "I Just Don't Know What to Do with Myself" and the double A-side "Guess Who?"/"Live It Up".

== Background ==
Just like the preceding Stay Awhile/I Only Want to Be with You, Dusty comprises tracks from Springfield's UK debut album A Girl Called Dusty (from which this album borrows the cover photo) as well as recordings from UK singles and EP's. The album also includes tracks from the very first recordings Springfield made in the United States as a solo performer. A total of eight tracks were recorded in New York in September 1964, produced by Shelby Singleton Jr., some of which were first issued in the UK on the 1965 EP Dusty in New York, others as single B-sides, while some in fact would remain unreleased in Springfield's native Britain for more than thirty years, until they had their debut as bonus tracks on the digitally remastered edition of the 1965 UK album Ev'rything's Coming Up Dusty – issued in 1998.

Dusty combined with Stay Awhile/I Only Want to Be With You was first released on CD as a single-disc compilation by the minor label Taragon Records in 1997 with stereo mixes created by Eliot Goshman. In 1999 the album was digitally remastered and re-issued by Mercury Records/Universal Music, then as a separate album and featuring three bonus tracks. One of these tracks is 'I'm Gonna Leave You', which features a similar verse melody to Ain't No Mountain High Enough, a song she wanted to record first.

== Track listing ==
Side A

1. "All Cried Out" (Buddy Kaye, Phil Springer) – 3:02
  - First release: Philips UK EP Dusty, BE 12564, 4 September 1964
2. "I Wish I'd Never Loved You" (Mike Hawker) – 3:35
  - First release: Philips UK EP Dusty
3. "Can I Get a Witness" (Lamont Dozier, Brian Holland, Edward Holland Jr.) – 2:43
  - First release: Philips UK EP Dusty
4. "Summer Is Over" (Tom Springfield, Clive Westlake) – 3:43
  - First release: Philips UK single BF 1369 (B-side of "Losing You"), 16 October 1964
5. "Don't Say It Baby" (Ted Daryll, Chip Taylor) – 2:22
  - Recorded in New York, September 1964. First UK release: Philips single BF 1396 (B-side of "Your Hurtin' Kinda Love"), 5 February 1965
6. "Guess Who?" (Gary Klein, Artie Kornfeld) – 2:31
  - Recorded in New York, September 1964. First UK release: bonus track 1998 re-issue of 1965 album Ev'rything's Coming Up Dusty

Side B

1. "Live It Up" (Leon Huff) – 2:24
  - Recorded in New York, September 1964. First UK release: Philips EP Dusty In New York, BE 12572, 9 April 1965
2. "My Coloring Book" (Fred Ebb, John Kander) – 3:00
  - First release: UK album A Girl Called Dusty, April 1964
3. "Nothing" (Frank Augustus, Bob Elgin, Clarence Lewis Jr.) – 2:09
  - First release: A Girl Called Dusty
4. "Do Re Mi (Forget About the Do and Think About Me)" (Earl King) – 2:20
  - First release: A Girl Called Dusty
  - 1999 CD-re-issue: remix
5. "Don't You Know" (Ray Charles) – 2:42
  - First release: A Girl Called Dusty
6. "I Just Don't Know What to Do with Myself" (Burt Bacharach, Hal David) – 2:59
  - Recorded in London, 4 June 1964. First release: Philips UK single BE 1348 (A-side), 26 June 1964

1999 reissue bonus tracks

13. "Every Ounce of Strength" (Steve Cropper, Isaac Hayes, David Porter) – 2:17
  - Recorded in London, 26 November 1965. First release: Philips UK single BF 1482 (B-side of "You Don't Have To Say You Love Me"), 25 March 1966
14. "I'm Gonna Leave You" (Dusty Springfield, Lesley Duncan, Madeline Bell) – 3:13
  - Recorded in London, 15 June 1966. First release: Philips UK single BF 1502 (B-side of "Goin' Back"), 1 July 1966
15. "Heartbeat" (unedited) (Edward Cobb) – 4:21
  - Recorded in London, 26 November 1965. Originally unissued. First release (edited): UK 4-CD box set The Legend of Dusty Springfield, 1994.

== Personnel ==
- Dusty Springfield – lead vocals; background vocals on "I'm Gonna Leave You" and "Heartbeat"
- The Breakaways – background vocals (UK sessions, except on "I'm Gonna Leave You" and "Heartbeat")
- Madeline Bell – background vocals on "I'm Gonna Leave You" and "Heartbeat"
- Lesley Duncan – background vocals on "I'm Gonna Leave You"
- Doris Troy – background vocals on "Heartbeat"
- Johnny Franz – producer
- The Echoes – accompaniment (UK sessions—side A, track 3; bonus tracks 13 & 15)
- Ivor Raymonde – orchestra director (UK sessions)
- Shelby Singleton Jr. – producer (New York sessions)
- Ray Stevens – arranger & orchestra director (New York sessions)
- Eliot Goshman – digital remastering (US) (1997 re-issue)
- Roger Wake – digital remastering (UK) (1999 re-issue)
- Mike Gill – digital remastering (UK) (1999 re-issue)
