= Stay Awhile/I Only Want to Be with You =

Studio album by Dusty Springfield
- Released: June 1964
- Recorded: October 1963 – January 1964
- Studios: Olympic Studios, Carton Street, London W1
- Genre: Pop
- Length: 31:38
- Labels: Philips Records (US); PHM 200-133 (mono); PHS 600-133 (stereo)
- Producer: Johnny Franz

Dusty Springfield chronology
Stay Awhile/I Only Want to Be with You (1964)	Dusty (1964)

Singles from Stay Awhile/I Only Want to Be with You
- 1. "I Only Want to Be with You" Released: 8 November 1963; 2. "Stay Awhile" Released: March 1964 (U.S.); 3. "Wishin' and Hopin'" Released: 1964

Professional ratings
Review scores
Source	Rating
AllMusic	4.5/5 stars

Stay Awhile/I Only Want to Be with You is the first album of the singer Dusty Springfield to be released in the US. It was issued on the Philips Records label in 1964 and includes Springfield's hit singles "I Only Want to Be with You", "Stay Awhile" and "Wishin' and Hopin'".

Springfield's British debut album A Girl Called Dusty was released in April 1964. The US debut, issued some three months later, was technically a compilation of tracks from A Girl Called Dusty, her first two UK singles, and other Springfield recordings. Her US label, the American arm of Philips Records, decided to include the singles on an album, rather than following the British practice of leaving them as singles. In addition, some B-sides and other recordings were included to form Stay Awhile/I Only Want to Be with You. The fact that her second, third, fourth and fifth American albums, Dusty, Ooooooweeee!!!, You Don't Have to Say You Love Me and The Look of Love were all put together the same way is generally believed to have contributed to Springfield leaving the American Philips label in 1968 and instead signing with Atlantic Records in the US, although she would remain with Philips/Phonogram in the UK and Europe until 1980.

Stay Awhile/I Only Want to Be with You and her four subsequent American LPs are therefore by some fans and music critics not considered to be among the 'true' Dusty Springfield albums, but they are, just like in the case of the Beatles and their early American LPs on the Capitol Records label, indeed Springfield's first five albums on the North American market and thus part of her official discography and consequently listed as such by acknowledged music databases like AllMusic.

Stay Awhile/I Only Want to Be with You combined with the following US album Dusty was first released on CD as a single-disc compilation by the US reissue label Taragon Records in 1997 with stereo mixes created by Eliot Goshman. In 1999 all five of Springfield's US albums were digitally remastered and re-issued by Mercury Records/Universal Music, then as five separate albums and each featuring bonus tracks.

== Track listing ==
Side A

1. "I Only Want to Be with You" (Mike Hawker, Ivor Raymonde) – 2:35
  - First release: Philips UK single BF 1292 (A-side), 8 November 1963
2. "Stay Awhile" (Mike Hawker, Ivor Raymonde) – 1:55
  - First release: Philips UK single BF 1313 (A-side), 7 February 1964
3. "Twenty Four Hours from Tulsa" (Burt Bacharach, Hal David) – 3:01
  - First release: UK album A Girl Called Dusty, 17 April 1964
4. "Mama Said" (Luther Dixon, Willie Denson) – 2:04
  - First release: A Girl Called Dusty
5. "Anyone Who Had a Heart" (Burt Bacharach, Hal David) – 2:54
  - First release: A Girl Called Dusty
6. "When the Lovelight Starts Shining Through His Eyes" (Lamont Dozier, Brian Holland, Edward Holland, Jr.) – 3:04
  - First release: A Girl Called Dusty
  - 1999 CD-re-issue: remix

Side B

1. "Wishin' and Hopin'" (Burt Bacharach, Hal David) – 2:53
  - First release: A Girl Called Dusty
2. "Mockingbird" (Inez Foxx, Charlie Foxx) – 2:34
  - First release: A Girl Called Dusty
3. "Will You Love Me Tomorrow" (Gerry Goffin, Carole King) – 2:39
  - First release: A Girl Called Dusty
4. "You Don't Own Me" (John Madara, David White) – 2:26
  - First release: A Girl Called Dusty
5. "Something Special" (Dusty Springfield) – 2:19
  - First release: Philips UK single BF 1313 (B-side of "Stay Awhile"), 7 February 1964
6. "Every Day I Have to Cry" (Arthur Alexander) – 2:27
  - First release: Philips UK EP I Only Want to Be With You, BE 12560, 6 March 1964

Bonus tracks 1999 reissue

13. "Baby Don't You Know" (Buddy Kaye, Bea Verdi) – 2:50
  - First release: Philips UK single BF 1418 (B-side of "In The Middle of Nowhere"), 11 June 1965
14. "Standing in the Need of Love" (Traditional) – 2:30
  - Originally unissued. Recording date: 17 October 1963.
15. "If It Hadn't Been for You" (Remix) (Buddy Kaye, Bea Verdi) – 2:25
  - First release (original mix): Philips UK single BF 1466 (B-side of "Little By Little"), 21 January 1966
- Tracks 13–15: personnel and production as below.

== Personnel and production ==
- Dusty Springfield – lead vocals
- The Breakaways – background vocals
- Madeline Bell, Doris Troy, Dusty Springfield – background vocals on "Baby Don't You Know" and "If It Hadn't Been For You"
- Johnny Franz – record producer
- Ivor Raymonde – orchestra director
- Eliot Goshman – digital remastering (US) (1997 re-issue)
- Roger Wake – digital remastering (UK) (1999 re-issue)
- Mike Gill – digital remastering (UK) (1999 re-issue)
