= Stay Awhile (Dusty Springfield song) =

1964 song

Single by Dusty Springfield

from the album Stay Awhile/I Only Want to Be with You
- B-side: "Something Special"
- Released: March 1964 (US)
- Label: Philips
- Songwriters: Mike Hawker; Ivor Raymonde

Dusty Springfield singles chronology
"I Only Want to Be with You" (1964)	"Stay Awhile" (1964)	"Wishin' and Hopin'" (1964)

"Stay Awhile"

Single by Continental Miniatures
- B-side: "Glad All Over"
- Released: May 1978 (US)
- Label: London
- Songwriters: Mike Hawker; Ivor Raymonde

"Stay Awhile" is a song originally recorded by British singer Dusty Springfield in 1964. It was released in March by London Records as the second single from her first album to be released in the US, Stay Awhile/I Only Want to Be with You (1964). The song became a top 20 hit in the United Kingdom, and reached the top 40 in Australia and the US.

== Charts ==
Dusty Springfield

Chart (1964)	Peak position
Australia (Kent Music Report)	27
UK Singles (OCC)	13
US Billboard Hot 100	38
US Cash Box Top 100	42

Continental Miniatures

Chart (1978)	Peak position
Canada Top Singles (RPM)	75
US Billboard Hot 100	90
US Cash Box Top 100	74

== Cover versions ==
- "Stay Awhile" was covered by the Continental Miniatures in 1978, becoming a minor hit in both the US and Canada.
- She & Him included the song on the 2014 album Classics.
- Rachel Sweet recorded the song on her debut Stiff album Fool Around in 1978.
