= Ev'rything's Coming Up Dusty =

Studio album by Dusty Springfield
- Released: 8 October 1965
- Recorded: June–July 1965
- Studio: Philips (London)
- Genre: Pop
- Length: 35:24
- Labels: Philips; RBL 1002 (mono); SRBL 1002 (stereo)
- Producer: Johnny Franz

Dusty Springfield chronology
A Girl Called Dusty (1964)	Ev'rything's Coming Up Dusty (1965)	Where Am I Going? (1967)

Alternative cover
- Cover of the US version of the album, You Don't Have To Say You Love Me

Professional ratings
Review scores
Source	Rating
Allmusic	4.5/5 stars

Ev'rything's Coming Up Dusty is the second studio album by singer Dusty Springfield, released on Philips Records in the UK in 1965. Springfield's 1964 debut album, A Girl Called Dusty, sold well enough to make her Philips Records' top-selling female artist. For this, her second album, Philips presented it in a gatefold sleeve and included extensive liner notes. While including a number of fairly standard "pop" songs, Ev'rything's Coming Up Dusty also saw Springfield venturing more into show tunes like "Who Can I Turn To (When Nobody Needs Me)?" as well as the soul music for which Springfield became so well known for singing. "Doodlin'" and "That's How Heartaches Are Made" were minor hits for Baby Washington, one of Springfield's personal favourite singers. Springfield also included the song "La Bamba", which was a popular concert number for her, though not in step with the general style of the album. The album gave Dusty another chart success peaking at No.6 on the UK Charts and No.4 on the NME charts that following month.

In 1960s Britain, it was fairly common for hit singles to be left off albums, as it was assumed that if someone was buying the album, they already had the singles. This was not the case, however, in the US. After Springfield's song "You Don't Have to Say You Love Me" became a huge hit, Ev'rything's Coming Up Dusty was re-titled and resequenced for re-release in the United States as the album You Don't Have to Say You Love Me. This album featured most of Ev'rything's Coming Up Dusty, plus the hit title track.

Ev'rything's Coming Up Dusty was released to CD for the first time in the early 1990s, and in 1998 a re-mastered version which included extra tracks was released.

== Track listing ==
Side A

1. "Won't Be Long" (J. Leslie McFarland) – 3:23
2. "Oh No Not My Baby" (Gerry Goffin, Carole King) – 2:48
3. "Long After Tonight Is All Over" (Burt Bacharach, Hal David) – 2:39
4. "La Bamba" (Traditional, arranged by Dusty Springfield) – 2:36
5. "Who Can I Turn To (When Nobody Needs Me)" (Anthony Newley, Leslie Bricusse) – 3:25
6. "Doodlin'" (Horace Silver, Jon Hendricks) – 2:48

Side B

1. "If It Don't Work Out" (Rod Argent) – 2:45
2. "That's How Heartaches Are Made" (Ben Raleigh, Bob Halley) – 2:46
3. "It Was Easier to Hurt Him" (Bert Russell, Jerry Ragovoy) – 2:45
4. "I've Been Wrong Before" (Randy Newman) – 2:24
5. "I Can't Hear You" (Gerry Goffin, Carole King) – 2:28
6. "I Had A Talk with My Man" (Billy Davis, Lenny Caston) – 2:56
7. "Packin' Up" (Margie Hendrix) – 2:05

Bonus tracks 1998 CD re-issue

14. "Live It Up" (Leon Huff) – 2:28
  - First release: US album Dusty, October 1964. First UK release: Philips EP Dusty In New York, BE 12572. Release date: 9 April 1965.
15. "I Wanna Make You Happy" (Mono mix) (Cynthia Weil, Russ Titelman) – 2:27
  - First release: US album Ooooooweeee!!!, March 1965. First UK release: Philips EP Dusty In New York, BE 12572. Release date: 9 April 1965.
16. "I Want Your Love Tonight" (Mono mix) (Bob Halley, Carl Spencer) – 2:05
  - First release: US album Ooooooweeee!!!, March 1965. First UK release: Philips EP Dusty In New York, BE 12572. Release date: 9 April 1965.
17. "Now That You're My Baby" (Mono mix) (Gerry Goffin, Arthur Kornfeld, Toni Wine) – 2:11
  - First release: US album Ooooooweeee!!!, March 1965. First UK release: Philips EP Dusty In New York, BE 12572. Release date: 9 April 1965.
18. "Guess Who?" (Gary Klein, Arthur Kornfeld) – 2:34
  - First release: US album Dusty, October 1964. First UK release: Ev'rything's Coming Up Dusty, 1998 CD re-issue.
19. "If Wishes Could Be Kisses" (Roy Alfred, Wes Farrell) – 2:55
  - First release: US album Ooooooweeee!!!, March 1965. First UK release: Ev'rything's Coming Up Dusty, 1998 CD re-issue.
20. "Don't Say It Baby" (Ted Daryll, Chip Taylor) – 2:25
  - First release: US album Dusty, October 1964. First UK release: Philips single BF 1396 (B-side of "Your Hurtin' Kinda Love"). Release date: 5 February 1965.
21. "Here She Comes" (Joseph Kookoolis, Salvatore Trimachi) – 2:22
  - First release: B-side of US single "Losing You", February 1965. First UK release: Ev'rything's Coming Up Dusty, 1998 CD re-issue.
- Track 14–21 produced by Shelby S. Singleton Jr., recorded in New York
- Tracks 14–21 only included on 1998 CD re-issue of Ev'rything's Coming Up Dusty

== Personnel and production ==
- Dusty Springfield – lead vocals, backing vocals
- Doris Troy – backing vocals
- Madeline Bell – backing vocals
- The Echoes – accompaniment
- Johnny Franz – record producer
- Ivor Raymonde – accompaniment & orchestra director
- Roger Wake – digital remastering/remix (1998 re-issue)
- Mike Gill – digital remastering/remix (1998 re-issue)
