= Ooooooweeee!!! =

1965 single by Dusty Springfield

Studio album by Dusty Springfield
- Released: March 1965
- Recorded: London/New York City, October 1963 – January 1965
- Genre: Pop
- Length: 30:17
- Labels: Philips (US); PHM 200-174 (mono); PHS 600-174 (stereo)
- Producers: Johnny Franz; Shelby Singleton Jr.

Dusty Springfield US albums 1964–1967 chronology
Dusty (1964)	Ooooooweeee!!! (1965)	You Don't Have to Say You Love Me (1966)

Singles from Ooooooweeee!!!
- 1. "Losing You" Released: 1964; 2. "Your Hurtin' Kinda Love" Released: 1965; 3. "In the Middle of Nowhere" Released: 1965

Professional ratings
Review scores
Source	Rating
AllMusic	4/5 stars

Ooooooweeee!!! was the third album by the singer Dusty Springfield to be released in the US, issued on the Philips Records label in 1965 and including the hit single "Losing You". Even more than Springfield's first two US albums, Ooooooweeee!!! can be considered as a compilation since it contains tracks both from her first British album, A Girl Called Dusty, and recordings originally issued on various A- and B-side singles and EPs – recorded and released in the UK over a period of some eighteen months. Ooooooweeee!!! also has tracks from Springfield's September 1964 sessions in New York, produced by Shelby Singleton Jr, some of which remain unreleased in Britain until 1998 and the CD re-issue of the 1965 album, Ev'rything's Coming Up Dusty.

Ooooooweeee!!! was first released on CD by Mercury Records/Universal Music in 1999, with three bonus tracks.

== Track listing ==
Side A

1. "Losing You" (Tom Springfield, Clive Westlake) – 3:07
  Recorded in London, 15 July 1964. First release: Philips UK single BF 1369 (A-side), 14 October 1964
2. "Here She Comes" (Joseph Kookoolis, Salvatore Trimachi) – 2:20
  Recorded in New York, September 1964. First UK release: 1998 CD reissue of 1965 album Ev'rything's Coming Up Dusty
3. "Once upon a Time" (Dusty Springfield) – 1:53
  Recorded in London, 17 October 1963. First release: Philips UK single 40162 (B-side of "I Only Want to Be With You"), 8 November 1963
4. "He's Got Something" (Kenny Lynch, Ian Samwell) – 2:34
  Recorded in London, 12 December 1963. First release: Philips UK EP I Only Want to Be With You, BE 12560, 6 March 1964
5. "You Don't Own Me" (John Madara, David White) – 2:26
  First release: UK album A Girl Called Dusty, April 1964
6. "Now That You're My Baby" (Gerry Goffin, Arthur Kornfeld, Toni Wine) – 2:11
  Recorded in New York, September 1964. First UK release: Philips UK EP Dusty in New York, BE 12572, 9 April 1965

Side B

1. "If Wishes Could Be Kisses" (Roy Alfred, Wes Farrell) – 2:52
  Recorded in New York, September 1964. First UK release: 1998 CD reissue of 1965 album Ev'rything's Coming Up Dusty
2. "I'll Love You for Awhile" (Gerry Goffin, Carole King) – 2:06
  Recorded in London, 22 January 1965. First UK release: Philips single BF 1430 (B-side of "Some of Your Lovin'"), 10 September 1965
3. "I Wanna Make You Happy" (Russ Titelman, Cynthia Weil) – 2:25
  Recorded in New York, September 1964. First UK release: Philips UK EP Dusty in New York, BE 12572, 9 April 1965
4. "Your Hurtin' Kinda Love" (Mike Hawker, Ivor Raymonde) – 2:37
  Recorded in London, 22 January 1965. First release: Philips UK single BF 1396 (A-side), 5 February 1965
5. "When the Lovelight Starts Shining Through His Eyes" (Lamont Dozier, Brian Holland, Edward Holland, Jr.) – 3:04
  First release: UK album A Girl Called Dusty, April 1964
6. "I Want Your Love Tonight" (Bob Halley, Carl Spencer) – 2:05
  Recorded in New York, September 1964. First UK release: Philips UK EP Dusty in New York, BE 12572, 9 April 1965

Bonus tracks 1999 reissue

13. "Go Ahead On" (Madeline Bell, Dusty Springfield) – 2:35
  Recorded in London, 26 August 1966. First release: Philips UK single BF 1510 (B-side of "All I See Is You"), 9 September 1966
14. "I Will Always Want You" ("Di Fronte All'Amore") (Silvana Simoni, Mario Coppola, Umberto Bindi) – 3:33
  Recorded in London, 30 June 1966. Originally unissued. First release: UK compilation Something Special, 1996
15. "Don't Let Me Lose This Dream" (Aretha Franklin, Ted White) – 2:24
  First release: UK album Where Am I Going?, 1967

== Personnel and production ==
- Dusty Springfield – lead vocals, backing vocals
- The Breakaways – backing vocals
- Madeline Bell – backing vocals
- Lesley Duncan – backing vocals
- The Echoes – accompaniment
- Johnny Franz – record producer
- Ivor Raymonde – orchestra director
- Alan Tew – orchestra director
- Shelby Singleton Jr. – record producer (New York sessions)
- Ray Stevens – arranger and orchestra director (New York sessions)
- Roger Wake – digital remastering (UK) (1999 re-issue)
- Mike Gill – digital remastering (UK) (1999 re-issue)
