= You Don't Have to Say You Love Me (Dusty Springfield album) =

Studio album by Dusty Springfield
- Released: July 1966
- Recorded: June 1965–March 1966
- Studios: Philips (London, UK)
- Genre: Pop
- Length: 33:10
- Labels: Philips (US); PHM 200-210 (mono); PHS 600-210 (stereo)
- Producer: Johnny Franz

Dusty Springfield US albums 1964-1967 chronology
Ooooooweeee!!! (1965)	You Don't Have to Say You Love Me (1966)	The Look of Love (1967)

Singles from You Don't Have to Say You Love Me
- 1. "Little by Little" Released: 1966; 2. "You Don't Have to Say You Love Me" Released: 1966

Professional ratings
Review scores
Source	Rating
AllMusic	4.5/5 stars

You Don't Have to Say You Love Me is the fourth album of singer Dusty Springfield to be released in the US, issued on the Philips Records label in 1966. The album was more or less a retitled re-issue of Springfield's British album Ev'rything's Coming Up Dusty, recorded and released in 1965, with the addition of the two hit singles "You Don't Have to Say You Love Me" and "Little by Little", both released in 1966. In fact, Ev'rything's Coming Up Dusty had been released in the US a few months prior, but as the title track of You Don't Have to Say You Love Me became a huge hit single for Springfield, Philips decided to repackage and retitle the album after the single.

The album was first released on CD by Mercury Records/Universal Music in 1999, then with the remaining three tracks from Ev'rything's Coming Up Dusty as bonus features.

== Track listing ==
All tracks from 1965 album Ev'rything's Coming Up Dusty unless otherwise noted

Side A

1. "You Don't Have to Say You Love Me" (Pino Donaggio, Vito Pallavicini, Simon Napier-Bell, Vicki Wickham) - 2:47
  - First release: Philips UK single BF 1482 (A-side), 25 March 1966
2. "Won't Be Long" (J. Leslie McFarland) - 3:20
3. "Oh No Not My Baby" (Gerry Goffin, Carole King) - 2:49
4. "Long After Tonight Is All Over" (Burt Bacharach, Hal David) - 2:37
5. "La Bamba" (Traditional) - 2:34
6. "Who Can I Turn To (When Nobody Needs Me)" (Anthony Newley, Leslie Bricusse) - 3:23

Side B

1. "Little by Little" (Buddy Kaye, Bea Verdi, Eddie Gin) - 2:33
  - First release: Philips UK single BF 1466 (A-side), 21 January 1966
2. "If It Don't Work Out" (Rod Argent) - 2:44
3. "It Was Easier to Hurt Him" (Bert Russell, Jerry Ragovoy) - 2:43
4. "I've Been Wrong Before" (Randy Newman) - 2:21
5. "I Can't Hear You" (Gerry Goffin, Carole King) - 2:27
6. "I Had a Talk with My Man" (Billy Davis, Lenny Caston) - 2:53

Bonus tracks 1999 reissue - The three bonus tracks on this reissue are the three tracks that appeared om Ev'rything's Coming Up Dusty that were originally omitted from You Don't Have to Say You Love Me.

13. "Doodlin'" (Horace Silver, Jon Hendricks) - 2:46
14. "That's How Heartaches Are Made" (Ben Raleigh, Bob Halley) - 2:48
15. "Packin' Up" (Margie Hendrix) - 2:04

== Personnel and production ==
- Dusty Springfield - lead vocals, backing vocals
- Doris Troy - backing vocals
- Madeline Bell - backing vocals
- The Echoes - accompaniment
- Johnny Franz - record producer
- Ivor Raymonde - accompaniment & orchestra director
- Roger Wake - digital remastering (UK) (1999 re-issue)
- Mike Gill - digital remastering (UK) (1999 re-issue)
