= Summer Is Over (Dusty Springfield song) =

Single by Dusty Springfield
- A-side: "Losing You"
- Released: 11 September 1964
- Length: 3:44
- Label: Philips BF1369
- Songwriters: Tom Springfield & Clive Westlake
- Producer: Johnny Franz

"Summer Is Over" is a 1960s song, most notably sung by Dusty Springfield.

== Composition ==
The song's music and lyrics were composed by Tom Springfield and Clive Westlake. It was originally recorded in 1964 by English-born Australian easy listening and country music singer Frank Ifield, and released as a single, with the B-side being a version of Buddy Holly's "True Love Ways".

== Springfield version ==
In October of the same year, Tom's sister, singer Dusty Springfield, the two of them having previously been members of the pop-folk vocal trio The Springfields, released the single "Losing You". She chose her version of "Summer is Over" as its B-side, with orchestral accompaniment directed by Ivor Raymonde. Both tracks were produced by Johnny Franz.

The single was released on 16 October 1964, entered the British chart on 28 October 1964, and reached the 9th position. "Summer Is Over" featured in her second album, titled Dusty, released in 1964. Her 1965 EP, Mademoiselle Dusty, included a French version of the song.

In 2008, author and critic, Anna J. Randall, wrote that the Dusty Springfield version begins "decisively" on the "down beat" while "the minor mode darkens the energy of its rising sixteenth-note figure" and "the guitar's metallic afterbeat gives it a distinct chill." The music, she wrote, "threatens to escape the scale, paralleling, perhaps, the closely tended images of summer that threaten to slip through the singer's desperate grasp," of a vocal performance that "establishes the heroine's nightmarishly circular sense of something finishing but never ending."

== Other versions ==
From 1964, until it was shut down by law in 1974, the pirate radio station Radio Veronica, transmitting from a former trawler outside the Dutch territorial waters, used the song's trumpet part for its station identification jingle.

In 1966, the Dutch singer Thérèse Steinmetz recorded a version in Dutch, which was the B-side of her single 'Speel Het Spel' ('Play The Game'). In 1982, the Dutch singer Liesbeth List released a version of "Summer is Over" in the Netherlands, titled "Wie Weet" ("Who Knows"), with different Dutch lyrics, written by T. de Winter.
