= A Girl Called Dusty =

Studio album by Dusty Springfield
- Released: 17 April 1964
- Recorded: January 1964
- Studios: Olympic Studios, Carton Street, London W1
- Genre: Pop
- Length: 32:54
- Label: Philips
- Producer: Johnny Franz

Dusty Springfield chronology
A Girl Called Dusty (1964)	Ev'rything's Coming Up Dusty (1965)

A Girl Called Dusty is the debut studio album by English singer Dusty Springfield. It was released on 17 April 1964 in the United Kingdom by Philips Records. The album peaked at No. 6 on the UK Album Charts and No. 5 on NME charts in May 1964.

== Background ==
Dusty Springfield had been a member of the girl group The Lana Sisters from 1958 to 1960, and the folk-pop trio The Springfields from 1960 to 1963 (in the latter case with her brother Tom Springfield). While on tour in the US in the early 1960s she was exposed to soul music, which was to have a profound impact on her subsequent life and career. Although The Springfields were moderately successful, with songs such as "Island of Dreams", "Bambino" and "Silver Threads And Golden Needles" (a No. 16 US country hit), their style of music limited the wide range of material that Dusty Springfield wanted to sing. Therefore, in 1963, Springfield decided to begin a career as a solo singer.

Her first single, "I Only Want to Be with You", was actually recorded while still a member of The Springfields, and was released one week after their final concert. The song was a success in both Britain and the US and led to the recording of A Girl Called Dusty which was released in 1964. The album contained a mix of mostly straightforward pop songs and a few Motown influenced numbers, such as "When The Lovelight Starts Shining Through His Eyes", "Will You Love Me Tomorrow" and "Mockingbird". It also marked Springfield's first collaboration with well-known songwriters Burt Bacharach and Hal David, as well as Gerry Goffin and Carole King, whose songs Springfield continued to record for the rest of her career.

At the time, A Girl Called Dusty was not released to the US market. Instead, Philips released a compilation of singles and tracks recorded for the album as Stay Awhile/I Only Want To Be With You. It was named after her first two singles, which had been Top 20 hits in the US. Later in 1964, Philips released Dusty, a second version of A Girl Called Dusty with a different track listing and different tracks.

== Release history ==
A Girl Called Dusty was first released both in mono (BL 7594) and stereo (SBL 7594) on 17 April 1964 by Philips Records, in the LP album format. The album had its first CD release in June 1990 by Philips Records/PolyGram, then a direct transfer from vinyl.

In 1997, two years before Springfield's death, a digitally remastered and expanded edition was issued by Mercury Records, then including eight bonus tracks as well as a few alternate mixes. Since most of the original multi-track master tapes are thought to be completely lost in the Philips Records archives, the tracks on the 1997 version are a mixture of mono mixes, new stereo remixes and new stereo mixes using alternate vocal takes. The current CD version of A Girl Called Dusty, which still remains in print, is consequently radically different from the original album as produced by Johnny Franz and Springfield herself.

== Reception ==
Professional ratings
Review scores
Source	Rating
Record Mirror	5/5 stars
NME	7/10

In review of the re-issue in 1997, James Oldham of the NME described the album as "pretty great debut album".

The album was included in Robert Dimery's 1001 Albums You Must Hear Before You Die.

== Track listing ==
Side A

1. "Mama Said" (Luther Dixon, Willie Denson) – 2:05
  1997 CD-re-issue: remix - 2:14
2. "You Don't Own Me" (John Madara, David White) – 2:29
  1997 CD-re-issue: alternate take - 2:31
3. "Do Re Mi" (Earl King) – 2:24
  1997 CD-re-issue: remix - 2:23
4. "When the Lovelight Starts Shining Through His Eyes" (Lamont Dozier, Brian Holland, Edward Holland, Jr.) – 2:55
  1997 CD-re-issue: remix - 3:08
5. "My Colouring Book" (Fred Ebb, John Kander) – 3:04
  1997 CD re-issue: mono mix - 3:04
6. "Mockingbird" (Inez Foxx, Charlie Foxx) – 2:37

Side B

7. "Twenty Four Hours From Tulsa" (Burt Bacharach, Hal David) – 3:04
  1997 CD-re-issue: remix - 3:07
8. "Nothing" (Frank Augustus, Bob Elgin, Clarence Lewis Jr.) – 2:10
  1997 CD-re-issue: remix - 2:29
9. "Anyone Who Had a Heart" (Burt Bacharach, Hal David) – 2:57
  1997 CD re-issue: alternate take - 3:11
10. "Will You Love Me Tomorrow" (Gerry Goffin, Carole King) – 2:41
11. "Wishin' and Hopin'" (Burt Bacharach, Hal David) – 2:56
12. "Don't You Know" (Ray Charles) – 2:39
  1997 CD-re-issue: remix - 2:53

Bonus tracks 1997 CD re-issue

13. "I Only Want to Be With You" (Alternate take) (Mike Hawker, Ivor Raymonde) – 2:42
  First UK release (original mix): Philips single BF 1292 (A-side). Release date: 8 November 1963.
14. "He's Got Something" (Alternate take) (Kenny Lynch, Ian Samwell) – 2:50
  First UK release (original mix): Philips EP I Only Want to Be With You, BE 12560. Release date: 6 March 1964
15. "Every Day I Have to Cry" (Arthur Alexander) – 2:31
  First UK release: Philips EP I Only Want to Be With You, BE 12560. Release date: 6 March 1964
16. "Can I Get a Witness (Remix) (Lamont Dozier, Brian Holland, Edward Holland, Jr.) – 2:46
  First UK release (original mix): Philips EP Dusty, BE 12564. Release date: 4 September 1964
17. "All Cried Out" (Remix) (Buddy Kaye, Phil Springer) – 3:05
  First UK release (Original mix): Philips EP Dusty, BE 12564. Release date: 4 September 1964
18. "I Wish I'd Never Loved You" (Alternate take) (Mike Hawker, Ivor Raymonde) – 3:40
  First UK release (original mix): Philips EP Dusty, BE 12564. Release date: 4 September 1964
19. "Once upon a Time" (Remix) (Dusty Springfield) – 1:57
  First UK release (original mix): Philips single BF 1292 (B-side of "I Only Want to Be With You"). Release date: 8 November 1963.
20. "Summer Is Over" (Tom Springfield, Clive Westlake) – 3:44
  First UK release: Philips single BF 1369 (B-side of "Losing You"). Release date: 16 October 1964.

== Personnel and production ==
- Dusty Springfield – lead vocals
- The Breakaways – background vocals
- Johnny Franz – record producer
- Ivor Raymonde – orchestra director
- Keith Grant – engineer
- Roger Wake – digital remastering/remix (1997 re-issue)
- Mike Gill – digital remastering/remix (1997 re-issue)

== Charts ==
Chart (1964)	Peak position
UK Albums (Official Charts)	6
New Musical Express	5
Melody Maker	4
Year End Album Charts	19
