= Wishin' and Hopin' =

1964 single by Dusty Springfield

Single by Dionne Warwick

from the album Presenting Dionne Warwick
- A-side: "This Empty Place"
- Released: 1963
- Recorded: Fall 1962
- Genre: Pop
- Length: 2:55
- Label: Scepter
- Songwriters: Burt Bacharach; Hal David
- Producers: Burt Bacharach; Hal David

Dionne Warwick singles chronology
"Don't Make Me Over" (1962)	"Wishin' and Hopin'" (1963)	"Make the Music Play" (1963)

"Wishin' and Hopin'"

Single by Dusty Springfield

from the album A Girl Called Dusty (UK) Stay Awhile/I Only Want to Be with You (U.S.)
- B-side: "Do Re Mi"
- Released: May 1964
- Recorded: January 1964
- Studio: Olympic (London)
- Genre: Pop
- Length: 2:53
- Label: Philips
- Songwriters: Burt Bacharach; Hal David
- Producer: Johnny Franz

Dusty Springfield singles chronology
"Stay Awhile" (1964)	"Wishin' and Hopin'" (1964)	"All Cried Out" (1963)

"Wishin' and Hopin'" is a song, written by Hal David and Burt Bacharach, which was a US Top 10 hit for Dusty Springfield in 1964.

== History ==
The song was first recorded by Dionne Warwick in the fall of 1962, and was the B-side of Warwick's single "This Empty Place" (also recorded in the fall of 1962) in the spring of 1963; the track was also featured on Warwick's debut album Presenting Dionne Warwick. Warwick's rendition became a charting single in France, reaching No. 79 in 1963. It was included again on Warwick's third album Make Way for Dionne Warwick. The song was originally published by Jonathan Music Co., Inc., a music publisher owned by the husband and manager of Kitty Kallen. (By contrast, other than their songs written for movies, Bacharach and David were publishing their songs mainly with their own publishing companies at the time, Blue Seas Music, Jac Music, and through the Leiber & Stoller-owned U.S. Songs, Inc.). Several of Kallen's mid-1960s singles, including "Star Eyes", "Make Someone Love You", and "I'll Teach You How To Cry", had B-sides published by Jonathan music, though Kallen did not end up recording "Wishin' and Hopin'".

== Dusty Springfield recording ==
Dusty Springfield, who had heard the Warwick album track, recorded "Wishin' and Hopin'" in January 1964 at Olympic Studios. Personnel for the session included Bobby Graham on drums, Big Jim Sullivan on guitar, and the Breakaways vocal group. Ivor Raymonde arranged and conducted on the session, for which Johnny Franz was the producer. The track was included on Springfield's solo album debuts in the UK: A Girl Called Dusty, and the US: Stay Awhile/I Only Want to Be with You.

In February 1964, Springfield met with Burt Bacharach in New York City to listen to other songs to consider recording. Bacharach recalls at that time: "I [think] I tried to talk her into releasing 'Wishin' and Hopin'' [as a single] because she had some ambivalence about it."

Springfield's version is recorded in the key of B major with a tempo of 108 beats per minute.

A New York disc jockey, Jack Lacy, played "Wishin' and Hopin'" following some encouragement from David and Bacharach, and Philips' US label issued it as a single in May 1964; "Wishin' and Hopin'" broke nationally that June, entering the Top Ten in July to peak at No. 6 on the Billboard Hot 100 and No. 4 Easy Listening, No. 4 in Cashbox. It also got to No. 1 on The American Bandstand top ten in July 1964. Cash Box described it as "a tantalizing, cha cha beat-ballad affair that Dusty waxes in money-in-the-bank-for-all-concerned fashion" with a "superb ork-choral arrangement."

The release of "Wishin' and Hopin'" as a concurrent UK single release for Springfield was precluded by the presence on the UK charts of Springfield's single "I Just Don't Know What to Do with Myself" – one of the songs Bacharach had pitched to her when they met in New York City in February 1964. "Wishin' and Hopin'" was recorded by UK band The Merseybeats, whose inaugural single had been another song (reissued in 1982) from the Presenting Dionne Warwick album: "It's Love That Really Counts" (UK No. 24). The Merseybeats "Wishin' and Hopin'" peaked at No. 13 on the UK Singles Chart in 1964, the same week Springfield's "I Just Don't Know What to Do with Myself" spent at its No. 3 peak. Another UK male vocal group, The Eagles, also had a single release of "Wishin' and Hopin'", although it was the B-side of their non-charting single "Write Me a Letter".

Despite not being a UK hit single for Springfield, "Wishin' and Hopin'" was strongly identified with her in the UK public consciousness: she performed the song with the Merseybeats on the 8 August, 1964 episode of Ready Steady Go! – actually both acts lip-synched to a track spliced together from their respective versions – and on that show's Sound of Motown edition broadcast 28 April, 1965 which Springfield hosted, the only one of her own songs she performed was "Wishin' and Hopin'" with the vocal accompaniment of Martha Reeves and the Vandellas.

Springfield's recording was featured in the film A Home at the End of the World (2004).

"Wishin' and Hopin'" was also featured in "Tricks and Treats", the second episode of American Horror Story: Asylum.

The song was featured in Netflix's Sex Education.

Springfield recorded foreign-language versions of "Wishin' and Hopin'" in July 1964: in Italian as "Stupido Stupido" – which was a combination of lyrics in Italian and English, the latter being newly written rather than taken from the original song – and in German as "Warten Und Hoffen". "Wishin' and Hopin'" was also a hit for Springfield in Australia (No. 2), New Zealand (No. 3), South Africa (No. 2), and Canada (No. 2).

=== Charts ===
Weekly chart performance for Springfield's version
Chart (1964)	Peak position
Australia (ARIA)	2
Canada (RPM)	2
New Zealand (Recorded Music NZ)	3
US Billboard Hot 100	6
US Billboard Easy Listening	4

Year-end chart performance for Springfield's version
Chart (1964)	Rank
US Billboard Hot 100	35

== Other versions ==
- Nancy Sinatra - for her 1966 album Nancy in London.
- Ani DiFranco's rendition of this song recorded in 1995 and released in November 1995, was featured over the opening credits of the film, My Best Friend's Wedding, and included on the US double platinum-selling soundtrack album. That film, along with the Austin Powers films, is suggested to have led to a renewed popularity of the Bacharach-David catalog.
