= I'll Try Anything =

Single by Dusty Springfield
- A-side: "I'll Try Anything"
- B-side: "The Corrupt Ones"
- Released: 1967
- Recorded: 22 January 1967
- Genre: Rock and roll
- Length: 2:32
- Label: Philips
- Songwriter(s): Mark Barkan/Vic Millrose
- Producer(s): Herb Bernstein/Johnny Franz

Dusty Springfield singles chronology
"All I See Is You" (1966)	"I'll Try Anything" (1967)	"Give Me Time" / "The Look of Love" (1967)

"I'll Try Anything" is a 1967 single by Dusty Springfield which reached the UK Top 20 and the US Top 40."I'll Try Anything" was co-written by Mark Barkan and Vic [aka Victor] Millrose.

In the US "I'll Try Anything" peaked at #40 in April 1967 on the Billboard Hot 100 – with peaks in Cashbox and Record World of respectively #29 and #34 – making it the sixth of Springfield's ten US Top 40 solo hits. "I'll Try Anything" reached #38 in Australia and #19 in Canada. The track had its strongest chart impact in Singapore with a #6 peak in June 1967.

== Background ==
Barkan had written the hits "I'm Gonna Be Warm This Winter" for Connie Francis and "I Don't Wanna Be a Loser" for Lesley Gore, while Millrose had written the Gene Pitney hit "Last Chance to Turn Around" and would later write "This Girl Is a Woman Now" for Gary Puckett & the Union Gap. Barkan, intending to write a song for Dusty Springfield, had already written the chorus for "I'll Try Anything" when Millrose came on board to co-write the verses. Springfield visited Barkan's residence to hear the song which Barkan sang to her while playing the piano, and although Springfield reacted favorably to the song she still wanted to hear a demo, and Barkan obliged by prepping a demo with Ellie Greenwich as vocalist.

Springfield began recording "I'll Try Anything" in a December 1966 session at the CBS Recording Studios (NYC) produced by Herb Bernstein: Barkan, who was present, recalls that the session lasted for nine hours with the first eight spent on Springfield recording another song: "The Morning After the Night Before", and the last hour spent on her recording "I'll Try Anything". On 22 January 1967 Springfield and Bernstein had another session at CBS Recording Studios which yielded a completed master of "I'll Try Anything": however Springfield elected to have the master's rhythm track extracted and used as the basis for a new recording of the song made at the Philips Studios in Stanhope Place in a 29 January 1967 session.

Since making her solo debut in 1963 with the upbeat "I Only Want to Be With You" Springfield had subsequently shifted her musical focus to a softer sound as exemplified by her 1966 career record "You Don't Have to Say You Love Me". "I'll Try Anything" was largely a return to Springfield's original upbeat sound and might have been a more substantial hit for her somewhat earlier. Billboard described the song as a change of pace for Springfield and a "strong rocker served up in the best emotional Springfield manner." However, by 1967 the track had a markedly out-of-date sound and in its UK release peaked at #13 breaking a Top Ten streak for Springfield which had lasted for three hits.

== Chart performance ==
Chart (1967)	Peak position
UK Singles (The Official Charts Company)	13
US Billboard Hot 100	40

== Other versions ==
Apart from Springfield's version, the only evident recordings of the song are two non-English renderings:

- The French-language "J'aurai mon tour de chance" recorded by Québécois singer Renée Martel (fr
- "Quero um Beatle de Presente" by Brazilian Jovem Guarda singer Maritza Fabiani with Portuguese lyrics by Carlos Wallace.
