= Dusty Springfield =

British singer (1939–1999)

Dusty Springfield OBE
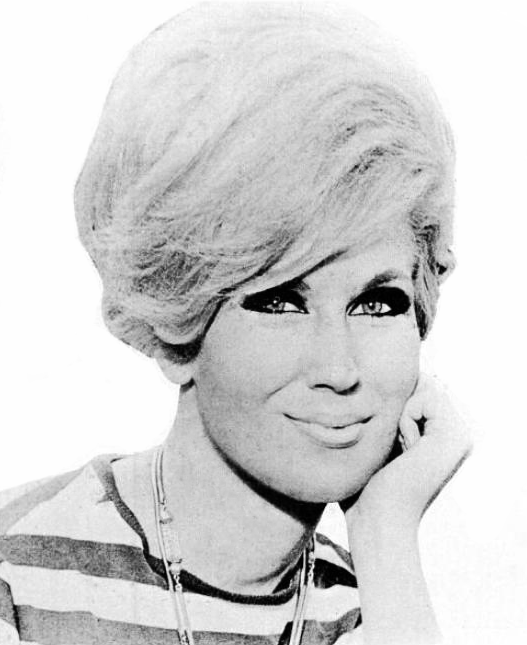
- Springfield in 1966
- Born: Mary Isobel Catherine Bernadette O'Brien; 16 April 1939; London, England
- Died: 2 March 1999 (aged 59); Henley-on-Thames, England
- Occupations: Singer; songwriter; record producer; television presenter
- Years active: 1958–1995
- Musical career
- Genres: Pop; blue-eyed soul; country; jazz; R&B
- Works: Dusty Springfield discography
- Labels: Philips; Mercury; Hippodrome; Parlophone; Columbia; Atlantic; Phonogram; ABC Dunhill; United Artists; 20th Century

Mary Isobel Catherine Bernadette O'Brien (16 April 1939 – 2 March 1999), better known by her stage name Dusty Springfield, was a British Irish singer. With her distinctive mezzo-soprano voice, she was a popular singer of blue-eyed soul, pop, and dramatic ballads, with French chanson, country, and jazz also in her repertoire. During her 1960s peak, she ranked among the most successful British performers on both sides of the Atlantic. Her image – marked by a peroxide blonde bouffant/beehive hairstyle, heavy makeup (thick black eyeliner and eye shadow), evening gowns, and stylised, gestural performances – made her an icon of the Swinging Sixties.

Born in West Hampstead in London to a family that enjoyed music, Springfield learned to sing at home. In 1958, she joined her first professional group, the Lana Sisters. Two years later, with her brother Dion O'Brien ("Tom Springfield") and Tim Feild, she formed the folk-pop vocal trio the Springfields. Two of their five 1961–63 top 40 UK hits – "Island of Dreams" and "Say I Won't Be There" – reached No. 5 on the charts, both in the spring of 1963. In 1962, they also achieved success in the United States with their cover of "Silver Threads and Golden Needles". Her solo career began in late 1963 with the upbeat pop record "I Only Want to Be with You"—a UK No. 4 hit, and the first of her six transatlantic top 40 hits in the 1960s, along with "Stay Awhile" (1964), "All I See Is You" (1966), "I'll Try Anything" (1967), and two releases which are now considered her signature songs: "You Don't Have to Say You Love Me" (1966 UK No. 1/US No. 4) and "Son of a Preacher Man" (1968/69 UK No. 9/US No. 10). The latter is featured on the 1968 pop and soul album Dusty in Memphis, one of Springfield's legacy-defining works. In March 2020, the US Library of Congress added the album to the National Recording Registry, which preserves audio recordings considered to be "culturally, historically, or aesthetically significant".

Between 1964 and 1969, Springfield enjoyed success in her native United Kingdom with several singles which in America either failed to chart or were not released, among them being "I Just Don't Know What to Do with Myself" (the biggest of her many Burt Bacharach/Hal David covers), "In the Middle of Nowhere", "Some of Your Lovin'", "Goin' Back", and "I Close My Eyes and Count to Ten". Conversely, she charted in the US (but not in the UK) with hits including "Wishin' and Hopin'", "The Look of Love", and "The Windmills of Your Mind". From 1971 to 1986, she failed to register a hit from five album releases (aside from a minor 1979 UK chart appearance), but her 1987 collaboration with UK synth-pop duo Pet Shop Boys, "What Have I Done to Deserve This?", took her back near the top of the charts, reaching No. 2 on both the UK Singles Chart and the Billboard Hot 100. The collaboration yielded two 1989 UK top 20 hits: "Nothing Has Been Proved" and "In Private". In 1990, Springfield charted with "Reputation" – the last of 25 UK top 40 hits in which she featured.

A fixture on British television, Springfield presented many episodes of the popular 1963–66 British TV music series Ready Steady Go! and, between 1966 and 1969, hosted her own series on the BBC and ITV. In 1966, she topped popularity polls, including Melody Maker's "Best International Vocalist", and was the first UK singer to top the New Musical Express readers' poll for best female singer. She has been inducted into the National Rhythm & Blues Hall of Fame, the Rock and Roll Hall of Fame, and the UK Music Hall of Fame. Multiple critics and polls have lauded Springfield as one of the greatest female singers in popular music.

== Early life ==
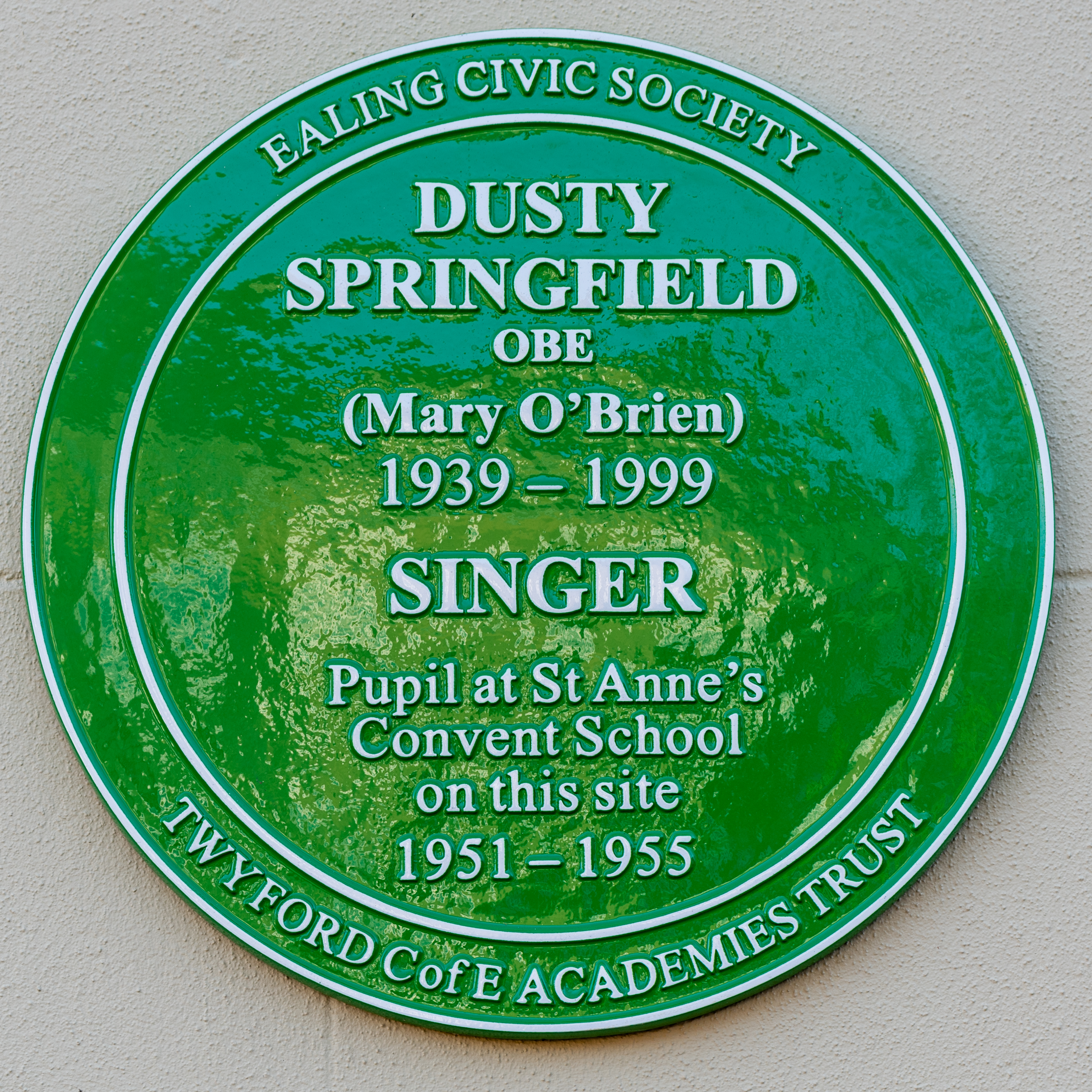
Green Plaque at the entrance of Ealing Fields High School in Ealing, London which Springfield, as Mary O'Brien, attended

Springfield was born Mary Isobel Catherine Bernadette O'Brien on 16 April 1939 in West Hampstead, the second child of Gerard Anthony 'OB' O'Brien (1904–1979) and Catherine Anne 'Kay' O'Brien (née Ryle; 1900–1974), both Irish immigrants. Springfield's elder brother, Dionysius Patrick O'Brien (2 July 1934 – 27 July 2022) was later known as Tom Springfield. Her father grew up in British India and worked as a tax accountant and consultant. Her mother came from an Irish family originally from Tralee, County Kerry, that included a number of journalists.

Dusty Springfield grew up in High Wycombe, Buckinghamshire living there until the early 1950s and later in Ealing in West London. She attended St Anne's Convent School in Northfields, a traditional all-girl Roman Catholic school in London. The comfortable middle-class upbringing was disturbed by dysfunctional tendencies in the family: her father's perfectionism and her mother's frustrations sometimes resulted in food-throwing incidents. Springfield and her brother were both prone to food-throwing as adults. She was given the nickname "Dusty" because she played football with boys in the street; she was described as being a tomboy.

Springfield grew up in a music-loving family. Her father tapped out rhythms on the back of her hand and encouraged her to guess which musical piece had the beat. She listened to a wide range of music including George Gershwin, Rodgers and Hart, Rodgers and Hammerstein, Cole Porter, Count Basie, Duke Ellington, and Glenn Miller. A fan of American jazz and the vocalists Peggy Lee and Jo Stafford, she wished to sound like them. At age 12 she recorded herself performing the Irving Berlin song "When the Midnight Choo-Choo Leaves for Alabama" at a record shop in Ealing.

== Career ==
=== 1958–1963: Career beginnings ===
After leaving school, Springfield sang with Tom, her brother, in local folk clubs. They acquired George Cassidy as tenor saxophonist during this period, and toured in Ireland. In 1957, the pair worked together at holiday camps. The next year, Springfield responded to an advertisement in The Stage to join The Lana Sisters, an "established sister act", with Iris "Riss" Long (also known as Riss Lana or Riss Chantelle) and Lynne Abrams (a.k.a. Lynne Lana), who were not actually sisters. Springfield adopted the stage name "Shann Lana" and "cut her hair, lost the glasses, experimented with makeup (and) fashion", becoming one of the "sisters".

As a member of the pop vocal trio, Dusty Springfield developed skills in harmonizing and microphone technique; she recorded, performed on television, and played at live shows in the United Kingdom and at United States Air Force bases in continental Europe. In 1960, she left the Lana Sisters and formed a folk-pop trio, The Springfields, with Tom and Reshad Feild (both had been in The Kensington Squares), the latter of whom Mike Hurst replaced in 1962. The trio chose their name while rehearsing in a field in Somerset in the springtime and took the stage names Dusty, Tom, and Tim Springfield. Intending to make an authentic US album, the group travelled to Nashville to record Folk Songs from the Hills. The music Springfield heard during their visit – but particularly the Exciters' "Tell Him", while in New York City – influenced her shift from folk and country towards pop rooted in rhythm and blues. The band was voted the Top British Vocal Group in a New Musical Express poll in 1961 and 1962, although their two biggest hits were in 1963, "Island of Dreams" and "Say I Won't Be There", both peaking at number five within five weeks of each other. The group appeared on the hip ITV music series Ready Steady Go!, which Springfield often presented in the earlier days of its run.

Dusty left the band after their final concert in October 1963. After the break-up of the Springfields, Tom continued songwriting and producing for other artists, notably Australian folk-pop group The Seekers, producing, writing, and/or co-writing their four defining mid-1960s hits: "I'll Never Find Another You", "A World of Our Own", "The Carnival is Over", and "Georgy Girl". He also wrote additional songs for Dusty – most famously her 1964 UK hit "Losing You", with Clive Westlake – and released his own solo material.

=== 1963–1966: Early solo career ===
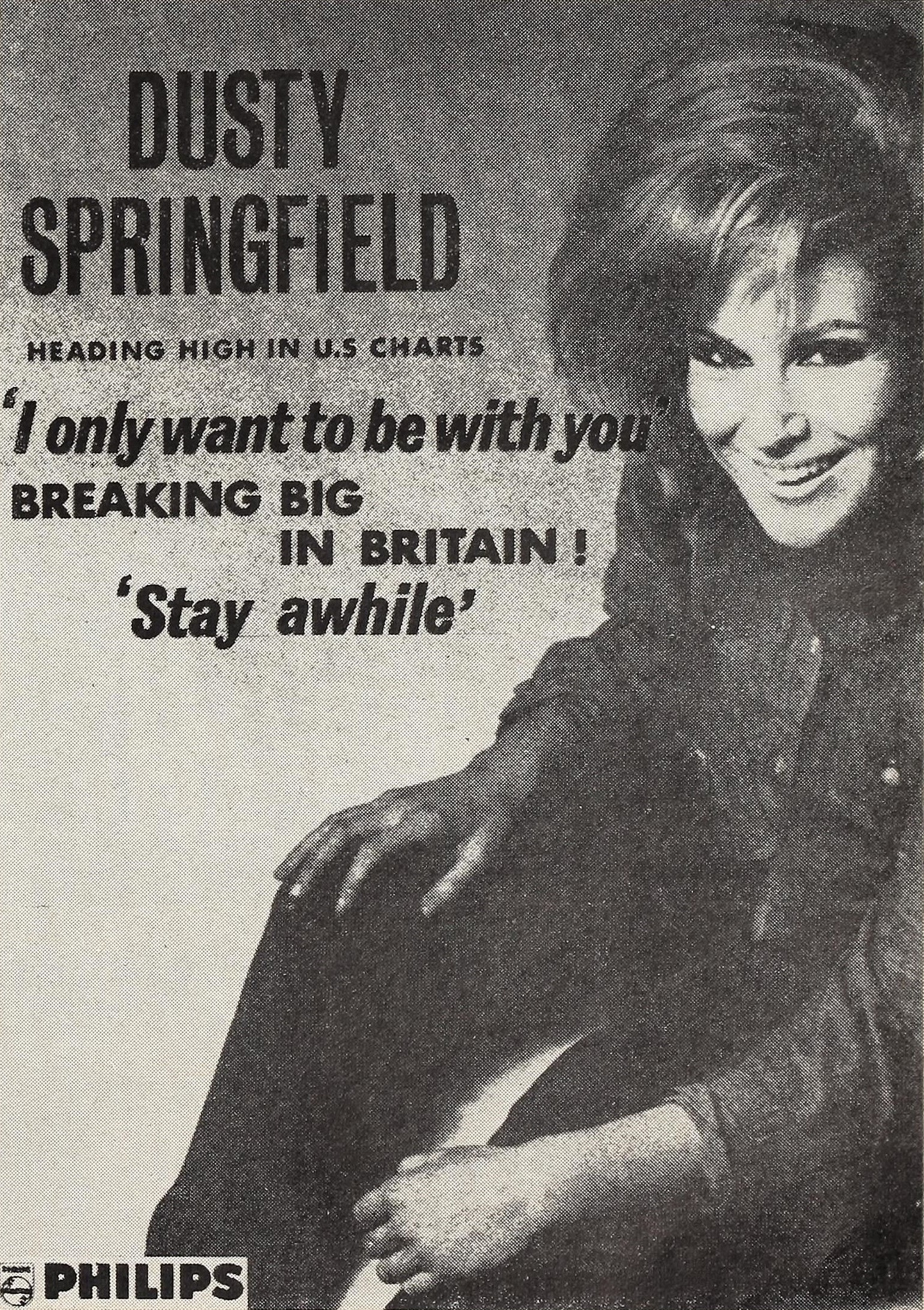
Cashbox advertisement, 7 March 1964

Dusty Springfield released her first solo single, "I Only Want to Be with You", co-written and arranged by Ivor Raymonde, in November 1963. The record was produced by Johnny Franz in a manner similar to Phil Spector's "Wall of Sound"; it included rhythm-and-blues features like horn sections, backing singers, and double-tracked vocals along with strings, recalling Springfield's influences such as the Exciters and the Shirelles. In January 1964, the single peaked at no. 4 on the UK charts during a lengthy (for the time) 18-week run. In December 1963, New York disc jockey "Dandy" Dan Daniel of WMCA nominated the single as a "Sure Shot" pick of records not yet charted, preceding Beatlemania. The single debuted on Billboard's Hot 100 on the chart dated 25 January 1964, a week after the debut of the Beatles' first hit "I Want to Hold Your Hand" and in the same week as the debut of "She Loves You", positioning Springfield at the forefront of the British Invasion. "I Only Want to Be with You" peaked at no. 12 during its ten-week chart run, and ranked 48 in the year-end Top 100 of New York radio station WABC. The BBC's 1964–2006 weekly chart-based music programme Top of the Pops debuted on 1 January 1964, with "I Only Want to Be with You" as the show's kick-off record. The single was certified gold in the UK, and its B-side, "Once Upon a Time", was written by Springfield.

Springfield's debut solo album A Girl Called Dusty – featuring mostly covers of her favourite songs – was released on 17 April 1964 in the UK (but not in America). Tracks included "Mama Said", "When the Lovelight Starts Shining Through His Eyes", "You Don't Own Me", and "Twenty Four Hours from Tulsa". In May 1964, the album reached no. 6 in the UK – one of only two of her Top Ten non-hits albums. After "I Only Want to Be with You", she had five more singles chart in 1964, with just "Stay Awhile" registering as a transatlantic success (UK no. 13/US no. 38). Its B-side, "Somethin' Special", was written by Springfield, later described as "a first-rate Springfield original" by AllMusic's Richie Unterberger. She was quoted as saying "I don't really see myself as a songwriter. I don't really like writing... I just don't get any good ideas and the ones I do get are pinched from other records. The only reason I write is for the money – oh mercenary creature!" The highest-charting of Springfield's 1964 releases were both Burt Bacharach-Hal David songs: "Wishin' and Hopin'" – a US no. 6 hit which featured on A Girl Called Dusty – and "I Just Don't Know What to Do with Myself", which in July peaked at no. 3 on the UK singles chart (behind the Beatles' "A Hard Day's Night" and the Rolling Stones' "It's All Over Now"). The dramatic and emotive "I Just Don't Know What to Do with Myself" set the standard for much of her later material. In the autumn of 1964, Springfield peaked at no. 41 in the United States with "All Cried Out", but in her native Britain she hit big with "Losing You" (UK no. 9/US no. 91), which peaked in December – the same month in which the singer's tour of South Africa, with her group The Echoes, was terminated following a controversial performance before an integrated audience at a theatre near Cape Town, in defiance of the government's segregation policy. Springfield was deported. Her contract specifically excluded segregated performances, making her one of the first British artists to do so. In the same year, she was voted the year's top British Female Singer in the New Musical Express readers' poll, ahead of Lulu, Sandie Shaw, and Cilla Black. Springfield received the award again for the next three years.

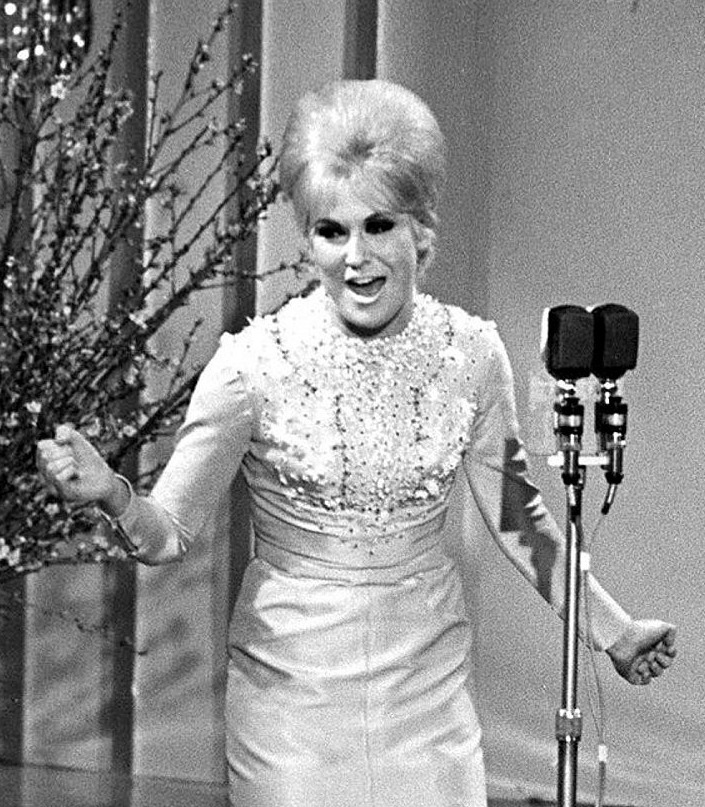
Springfield in 1965

In 1965, Springfield reached the UK Top 40 with three hit singles: "Your Hurtin' Kinda Love" (no. 37), "In the Middle of Nowhere" (no. 8) and the Gerry Goffin/Carole King-penned "Some of Your Lovin'" (no. 8), though none was included on her next UK album recorded with The Echoes, Ev'rything's Coming Up Dusty. Released in October 1965, the LP featured songs by Leslie Bricusse, Anthony Newley, Rod Argent, and Randy Newman, and a cover of the traditional Mexican song "La Bamba". In November 1965, the album peaked at no. 6 on the UK chart. Springfield's one appearance on Billboard's Hot 100 in 1965 was "Losing You", which stalled at 91.

From 28 to 30 January 1965, Springfield took part in the Italian Song Festival in San Remo, reaching a semi-final with "Tu che ne sai?" (English: "What Do You Know?") while failing to qualify for the final. During the competition, she heard the song "Io Che Non Vivo (Senza Te)", performed by one of its composers, Pino Donaggio, and separately by US country music singer Jody Miller. An English-language version, "You Don't Have to Say You Love Me", featured lyrics newly written by Springfield's friend (and future manager) Vicki Wickham and another future manager, Simon Napier-Bell. Springfield's dramatic recording of the ballad was released in March 1966 and reached number one in the UK in its fifth week on the singles chart. Success followed in the US, where in July it reached no. 4 on Billboard's Hot 100, ranking 21 for the year. Springfield called it "good old schmaltz", and it became her signature song. In 1967, Springfield was nominated for the Best Contemporary (R&R) Solo Vocal Performance – Male or Female award at the 9th Annual Grammy Awards, losing to Paul McCartney for "Eleanor Rigby". In 1999, "You Don't Have to Say You Love Me" featured in an all-time Top 100 of songs as voted for by listeners of BBC Radio 2.

There, standing on the staircase at Philips Studio, singing into the stairwell, Dusty gave her greatest ever performance – perfection from first breath to last, as great as anything by Aretha Franklin or Sinatra or Pavarotti. Great singers can take mundane lyrics and fill them with their own meaning. This can help a listener's own ill-defined feelings come clearly into focus. Vicki [Wickham] and I had thought our lyric was about avoiding emotional commitment. Dusty stood it on its head and made it a passionate lament of loneliness and love.

— Simon Napier-Bell, "Flashback: Dusty Springfield", The Observer (19 October 2003).

In 1966, Springfield scored with three other UK hits, all varying in style: the snappy "Little By Little" (no. 17), a cover of Gerry Goffin and Carole King's poignant and reflective "Goin' Back" (no. 10), and the sweeping dramatic ballad "All I See Is You" (no. 9), co-written by Ben Weisman and Clive Westlake. The last peaked at no. 20 in the United States. In August and September 1966, she hosted Dusty, a six-part BBC TV music/talk show series. A compilation of her singles, Golden Hits, released in November 1966, peaked at no. 2 in the UK (behind the soundtrack to The Sound of Music). From the mid-1960s onward Springfield used the pseudonym "Gladys Thong" when recording backing vocals for other artists including Madeline Bell, Kiki Dee, Anne Murray, and Elton John. Bell was a regular backing singer on early Springfield albums, and the pair, together with Lesley Duncan, co-wrote "I'm Gonna Leave You" , the B-side of "Goin' Back".

During this period, Springfield was also known for her love of Motown. She introduced the Motown sound to a wider UK audience, both with her covers of Motown songs and by facilitating the first UK TV appearance for the Temptations, the Supremes, Martha & The Vandellas, the Miracles, and Stevie Wonder in a special edition of the 1963–66 British TV music series Ready Steady Go!, produced by Vicki Wickham. The Sound of Motown was broadcast by Associated-Rediffusion/ITV on 28 April 1965, with Springfield opening each half accompanied by Martha and the Vandellas and Motown's in-house band, the Funk Brothers. The associated touring Tamla-Motown Revue – featuring the Supremes, the Miracles and Stevie Wonder – had started in London in March and was, according to the Supremes' Mary Wilson, a flop: "It's always... disheartening when you go out there and you see the house is half-full... but once you're on stage... You perform as well for five as you do for 500." Wickham, a fan of the Motown artists, booked them for the Ready Steady Go! special and enlisted Springfield to host it.

=== 1967–68 ===
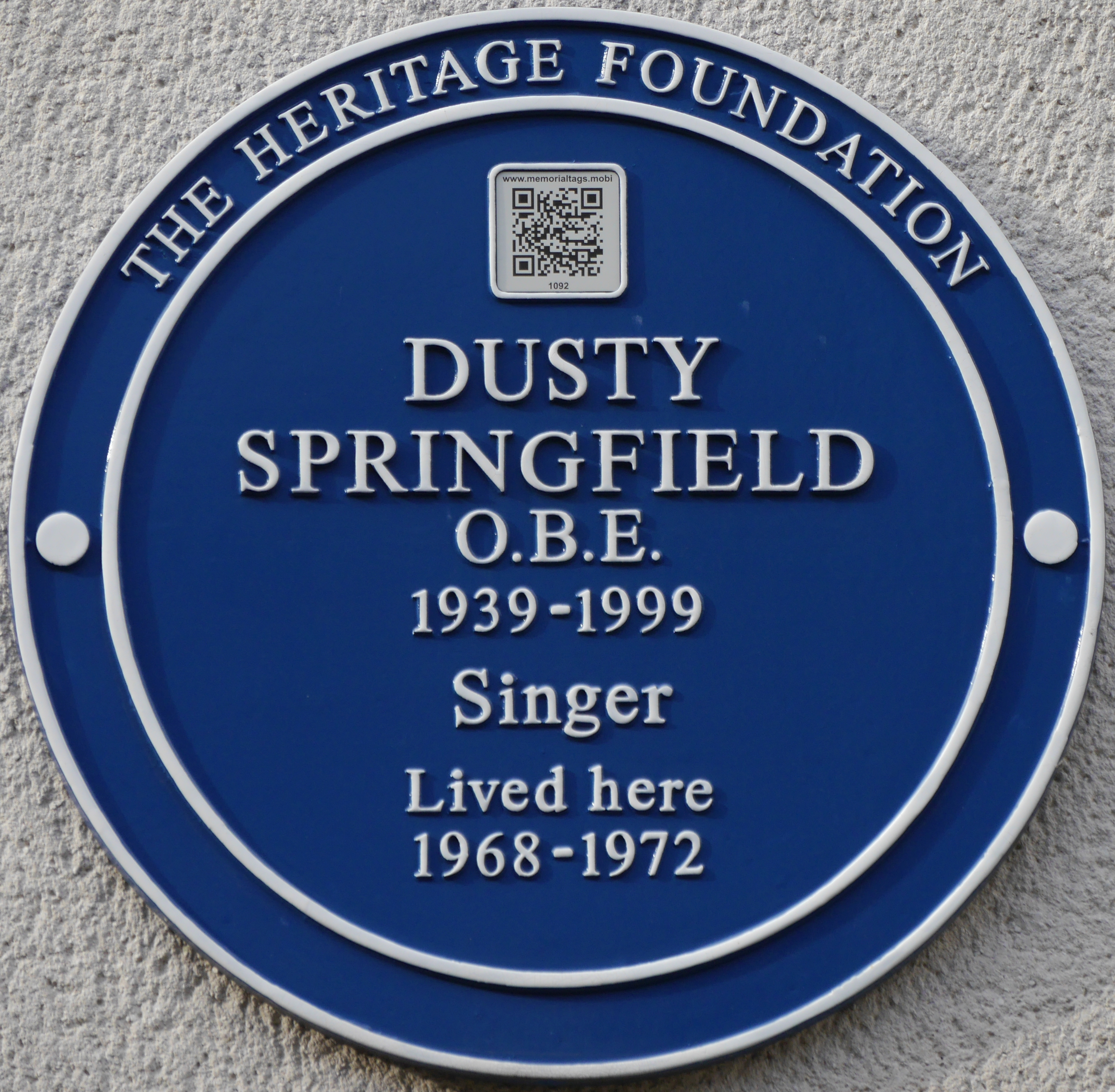
Plaque, 38–40 Aubrey Walk, London

As with Springfield's chart success in the previous three years, there was minimal agreement in 1967 and 1968 between UK and US releases. The closest Springfield got to a transatlantic hit during this period was the spirited "I'll Try Anything", which charted in the spring of 1967 (UK no. 13/US no. 40). The follow-up single, "Give Me Time" – the singer's last traditional-sounding sweeping ballad – peaked outside the UK Top 20 (no. 24) and stalled at 76 in the United States. However, the single's B-side – the smokey-sultry Bacharach-David song "The Look of Love", recorded for the James Bond parody film Casino Royale – emerged as one of Springfield's five defining US 1960s hits. For "one of the slowest-tempo hits" of the sixties, Bacharach created the "sultry" feel by the use of "minor-seventh and major-seventh chord changes", while Hal David's lyrics "epitomised longing and, yes, lust." The song was recorded in two versions at the Philips Studios in London. The soundtrack version was released on 29 January 1967. The single version charted briefly in July, then re-entered Billboard's Hot 100 in early September, peaking at no. 22. However, it reached the Top Ten in several markets across the US, reaching number one in San Francisco (KFRC and KYA) and San Jose, California (KLIV) and no. 2 in Boston (WBZ), among other cities. "The Look of Love" received an Academy Award nomination for Best Song.

In August and September 1967, Springfield headlined the second season of her BBC TV series Dusty (also known as The Dusty Springfield Show), in which she welcomed guests and performed songs, among them a rendition of "Get Ready" and her then-recent hit "I'll Try Anything". The series attracted a healthy audience but was seen as not keeping up with changes in pop music. Springfield's next LP Where Am I Going? (October 1967) – her first album of new material since 1965 – experimented with various styles including a "jazzy", orchestrated version of "Sunny" and an acclaimed cover of Jacques Brel's "Ne me quitte pas" ("If You Go Away"). Though critically appreciated, the album peaked at 40 in the UK and failed to chart in the US. In November 1968, a similar fate befell Dusty... Definitely, which was not issued in the US, though it reached no. 30 in the UK during a six-week chart run. Material ranged from the rolling "Ain't No Sun Since You've Been Gone" to the achingly emotive cover of Randy Newman's "I Think It's Gonna Rain Today". Also in 1968, Springfield scored with one of her biggest UK hits of the decade: the dramatic "I Close My Eyes and Count to Ten", written by Clive Westlake. The single peaked at no. 4 in August 1968. Its flip side, "No Stranger Am I", was co-written by American singer-songwriter Norma Tanega – known for her transatlantic 1966 Top 30 folk-pop hit "Walkin' My Cat Named Dog" – and Norma Kutzer. By late 1966, Springfield was in a domestic relationship with Tanega. Springfield's 1968 TV series It Must Be Dusty was broadcast on ITV in May and June; episode six featured a duet performance of "Mockingbird" with singer-guitarist Jimi Hendrix, fronting his band the Experience.

=== 1968–69: Dusty in Memphis ===
By the late 1960s, Carole King – who with Gerry Goffin co-wrote "Some of Your Lovin'", "Goin' Back" and four songs on the Dusty in Memphis album – had embarked on a solo singing career. At the same time, Springfield's relationship with the high-charting Bacharach–David partnership was floundering. Her status in the music industry was further complicated by a "progressive" music revolution which dictated an uncomfortable dichotomy: underground/"fashionable" vs. pop/"unfashionable". Her performing career was limited to the UK touring circuit of working men's clubs, hotels and cabarets. Hoping to reinvigorate her career and boost her credibility, she signed with Atlantic Records, the label of her idol Aretha Franklin. (She signed with the label only in the United States; she remained under contract with Philips outside the USA.)

The Memphis sessions at the American Sound Studio were produced by Jerry Wexler, Tom Dowd, and Arif Mardin; the back-up vocal band Sweet Inspirations; and the instrumental band Memphis Boys. They were led by guitarist Reggie Young and bass guitarist Tommy Cogbill. The producers recognized that Springfield's natural soul voice should be placed at the forefront, rather than competing with full string arrangements. At first, she felt anxious when compared with the soul greats who had recorded in the same studios. She had never worked with just a rhythm track, and it was her first time with outside producers; many of her previous recordings had been self-produced, while not being credited. Wexler felt Springfield had a "gigantic inferiority complex", and due to her pursuit of perfection, her vocals were re-recorded later, in New York. In November 1968, during the Memphis sessions, Springfield suggested to Wexler (one of the heads of Atlantic Records) that he should sign the newly formed UK band Led Zeppelin. She knew their bass guitarist, John Paul Jones, from his session work on her earlier albums. Without ever having seen them and partly on her advice, Wexler signed Led Zeppelin to a $200,000 deal with Atlantic – the biggest such contract for a new band until then.

The album Dusty in Memphis received excellent reviews on its initial releases both in the UK and US. Greil Marcus of Rolling Stone magazine wrote: "most of the songs... have a great deal of depth while presenting extremely direct and simple statements about love... Dusty sings around her material, creating music that's evocative rather than overwhelming... Dusty is not searching – she just shows up, and she, and we, are better for it."

=== After Dusty in Memphis ===
Commercial and chart success did not follow. The album failed to chart in the UK, and in April 1969 it stalled at no. 99 on Billboard's Top LP's chart, with sales of 100,000 copies. However, by 2001, the album had received the Grammy Hall of Fame award and was listed among the greatest albums of all time by US music magazine Rolling Stone and in polls conducted by VH1, New Musical Express and UK TV network Channel 4. In November 1968, the album's lead single, "Son of a Preacher Man", was issued. It was written by John Hurley and Ronnie Wilkins. Credited as "Son-of-a Preacher Man" on UK, US and other releases, it became an international hit, reaching no. 9 in the UK singles chart and no. 10 on Billboard's Hot 100 in January 1969. In continental Europe, the single reached the Top Ten in the Austrian, Dutch and Swiss charts. In 1970, Springfield was nominated for the Best Contemporary Vocal Performance, Female award at the 24th Annual Grammy Awards, losing to "Is That All There Is?" by Peggy Lee, whom Springfield often cited as an influence. In 1987, Rolling Stone magazine placed the single at no. 77 in its critics' list The 100 Best Singles of the Last 25 Years. In 2002, the record ranked 43 in the 100 Greatest Singles of All Time, as voted for by New Musical Express critics. In 2004, Rolling Stone ranked it 240 in its list of The 500 Greatest Songs of All Time. "Son of a Preacher Man" found a new audience when it was included on the soundtrack of Quentin Tarantino's 1994 film Pulp Fiction. The soundtrack reached no. 21 on Billboard's Billboard 200 album chart and at the time went platinum (100,000 units) in Canada alone. It is thought that "Son of a Preacher Man" contributed to the sales of the soundtrack album, which sold more than 2 million copies in the US.

During September and October 1969, Springfield hosted her third and final BBC musical variety series (her fourth variety series overall), Decidedly Dusty (co-hosted by Valentine Dyall). All eight episodes were later wiped from the BBC archives, and to date the only surviving footage consists of domestic audio recordings.

Until her 1987 comeback with Pet Shop Boys, 1969 marked the last year in which Springfield achieved any notable singles chart presence. In Britain, following "Son of a Preacher Man", she charted with only "Am I the Same Girl" (no. 43), while on the US Hot 100 she charted with the double A-side "Don't Forget About Me" (no. 64)/"Breakfast in Bed" (no. 91), a cover of "The Windmills of Your Mind" (no. 31), "Willie & Laura Mae Jones" (no. 78) and "A Brand New Me" (no. 24). Springfield's 1960s repertoire also is noted for interpretations of songs associated primarily with other artists. Those which have appeared on Springfield EPs and compilations include "Twenty Four Hours from Tulsa", "You Don't Own Me", "La Bamba", "If You Go Away" (released on the 1968 Philips EP If You Go Away, which also featured tracks such as "Magic Garden" and "Sunny"), "Piece of My Heart" (released as "Take Another Little Piece of My Heart"), "I Think It's Gonna Rain Today", Spooky and "Yesterday When I Was Young".

Springfield was one of the best-selling UK singers of the 1960s. She was voted the Top Female Singer (UK) by the readers of the New Musical Express in 1964 to 1966 and Top Female Singer in 1965 to 1967 and 1969.

=== 1970s ===
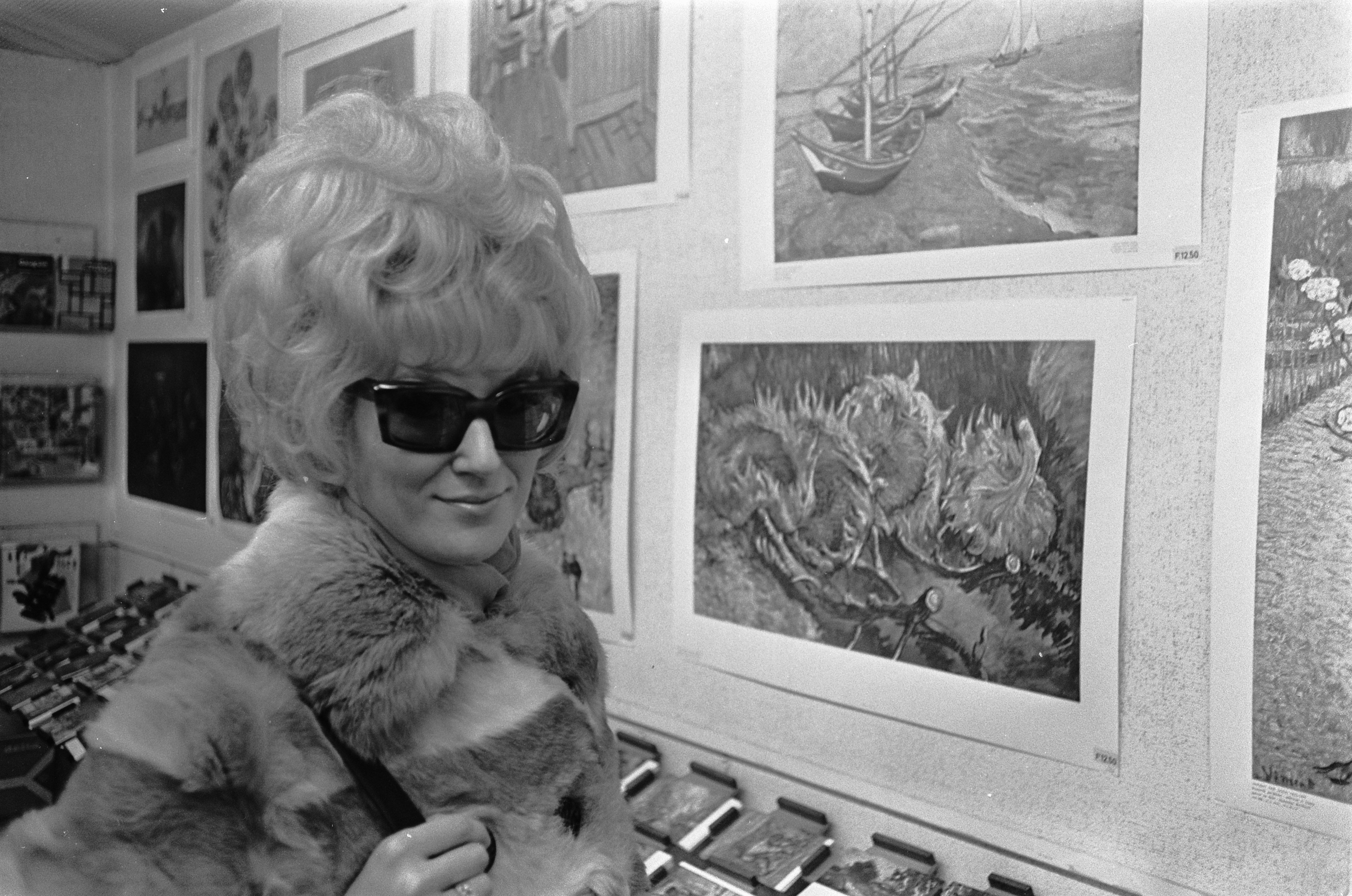
Springfield at the Stedelijk Museum in Amsterdam, 1968

By the beginning of the 1970s, Springfield was a major star, though her record sales were declining. Her partner, Norma Tanega, had returned to the US after their relationship had become stressful, and Springfield was spending more time in the US herself. In January 1970, her second and final album on Atlantic Records, A Brand New Me (re-titled From Dusty... With Love in the UK), was released; it featured tracks written and produced by Gamble and Huff. The album and related singles only sold moderately; Springfield was unhappy with both her management and record company. She sang backing vocals with her friend Madeline Bell on two tracks on Elton John's 1971 hit album Tumbleweed Connection. Springfield recorded some songs with producer Jeff Barry in early 1971, which were intended for an album to be released by Atlantic Records. However, her new manager Alan Bernard negotiated her out of the Atlantic contract; some of the tracks were used on the UK-only album See All Her Faces (November 1972) and the 1999 release Dusty in Memphis-Deluxe Edition. She signed a contract with ABC Dunhill Records in 1972, and Cameo was issued in February 1973 to respectable reviews, though poor sales.

In 1973, Springfield recorded the theme song for the TV series The Six Million Dollar Man, which was used for two of its film-length episodes: "Wine, Women & War" and "The Solid Gold Kidnapping". Her second ABC Dunhill album was given the working title Elements and was then scheduled for release in late 1974 as Longing. However, the recording sessions were abandoned, although part of the material, including tentative and incomplete vocals, was issued on the 2001 posthumous compilation Beautiful Soul, and the album eventually received a standalone release in June 2025. In the mid-1970s she sang background vocals on Elton John's album Caribou (June 1974), including his single "The Bitch Is Back"; and on Anne Murray's album Together (November 1975). By 1974, Springfield put her solo musical career on hold and lived as a recluse in the US avoiding scrutiny by UK tabloids. In the 1960s and early 1970s, gay or bisexual performers "knew that being 'out' would lead to prurient media attention, loss of record contracts... the tabloids became obsessively interested in the contents of celebrity closets". Springfield did not record again until the summer of 1977, when she began recording It Begins Again.

In the late 1970s, Springfield released two albums on United Artists Records. The first was It Begins Again, issued in 1978 and produced by Roy Thomas Baker. The album peaked in the UK top 50 and was well received by critics. Her next album, Living Without Your Love (1979), did not reach the top 50. In early 1979, Springfield played club dates in New York City. In London, she recorded two singles with David Mackay for her UK label, Mercury Records (formerly Philips Records). The first was the disco-influenced "Baby Blue", co-written by Trevor Horn and Geoff Downes, which reached no. 61 in the UK. The second, "Your Love Still Brings Me to My Knees", released in January 1980, was Springfield's final single for Mercury Records; she had been with the label for nearly 20 years. On 3 December 1979, Springfield performed a charity concert for a full house at the Royal Albert Hall, in the presence of Princess Margaret.

=== 1980s ===
In 1980, Springfield sang "Bits and Pieces", the theme song from the movie The Stunt Man. She signed a US deal with 20th Century Records, which resulted in the single "It Goes Like It Goes", a cover of the Oscar-winning song from the film Norma Rae. Springfield was uncharacteristically proud of her 1982 album White Heat, which was influenced by new wave music. She tried to revive her career in 1985 by returning to the UK and signing to Peter Stringfellow's Hippodrome Records label. This resulted in the single "Sometimes Like Butterflies" and an appearance on Terry Wogan's TV chat show Wogan. None of Springfield's singles from 1971 to 1986 charted on the UK Top 40 or Billboard Hot 100.

In 1987, she accepted an invitation from Pet Shop Boys to duet with their lead singer, Neil Tennant, on the single "What Have I Done to Deserve This?". Tennant cites Dusty in Memphis as one of his favourite albums, and he leapt at the suggestion of using Springfield's vocals for "What Have I Done To Deserve This?". She also appeared on the promotional video. The single rose to no. 2 on both the US and UK charts. It appeared on the Pet Shop Boys album Actually, and on both artists' greatest-hits collections. Springfield sang lead vocals on the Richard Carpenter song "Something in Your Eyes". "Something in Your Eyes" was featured on Carpenter's first solo album, Time (October 1987); released as a single, it became a US no. 12 adult contemporary hit. Springfield recorded a duet with B. J. Thomas, "As Long as We Got Each Other", which was used as the opening theme for the US sitcom Growing Pains in season 4 (1988–89). (Thomas had collaborated with Jennifer Warnes on the original version, which was neither re-recorded with Warnes nor released as a single.) It was issued as a single and reached no. 7 on the Adult Contemporary Singles Chart. In 1988, a new compilation, The Silver Collection, was issued. Springfield returned to the studio with the Pet Shop Boys, who produced her recording of their song "Nothing Has Been Proved", commissioned for the soundtrack of the 1989 drama film Scandal. Released as a single in February 1989, it gave Springfield her fifteenth UK Top 20 hit. In November its follow-up, the upbeat "In Private", also written and produced by Pet Shop Boys, peaked at no. 14.

=== 1990s ===
Springfield's 1990 album, Reputation, was her third UK Top 20 studio album. The writing and production credits for half the album, which included the two recent hit singles, went to Pet Shop Boys, while the album's other producers included Dan Hartman. By 1988 Springfield had left California and other than when recording tracks for Reputation, she returned to the UK to live. In 1993, she recorded a duet with her former 1960s professional rival and friend, Cilla Black. In October, "Heart and Soul" was released as a single and, in September it had appeared on Black's album, Through the Years. Springfield's next album, provisionally titled Dusty in Nashville, was started in 1993 with producer, Tom Shapiro, but was issued as A Very Fine Love in June 1995. Though originally intended by Shapiro as a country music album, the track selection by Springfield pushed the album into pop music with an occasional country feel.

The last studio track Springfield recorded was George and Ira Gershwin's song "Someone to Watch Over Me" in London in 1995 for an insurance company TV ad. It was included on Simply Dusty (2000), an anthology that she had helped plan. Her final live singing performance was on Later with Jools Holland on 30 June 1995. She also appeared on the Christmas with Michael Ball special in December 1995, but this was lip synched for television.

According to Australian film director Emma-Kate Croghan, Springfield personally approved the use of her recording of "The Look of Love" in the 1999 film Strange Planet just days before her death in March 1999.

=== Musical style ===
Influenced by US pop music, Dusty Springfield created a distinctive blue-eyed soul sound. BBC News noted "[h]er soulful voice, at once strident and vulnerable, set her apart from her contemporaries... She was equally at home singing Broadway standards, blues, country or even techno-pop". Allmusic's Jason Ankeny described her:

[T]he finest white soul singer of her era, a performer of remarkable emotional resonance whose body of work spans the decades and their attendant musical transformations with a consistency and purity unmatched by any of her contemporaries; though a camp icon of glamorous excess in her towering beehive hairdo and panda-eye black mascara, the sultry intimacy and heartbreaking urgency of [her] voice transcended image and fashion, embracing everything from lushly orchestrated pop to gritty R&B to disco with unparalleled sophistication and depth.

Most responses to her voice emphasise her breathy sensuality. Another powerful feature was the sense of longing, in songs such as "I Just Don't Know What to Do with Myself" and "Goin' Back". The uniqueness of Springfield's voice was described by Bacharach: "You could hear just three notes and you knew it was Dusty". Wexler declared, "[h]er particular hallmark was a haunting sexual vulnerability in her voice, and she may have had the most impeccable intonation of any singer I ever heard". Greil Marcus of Rolling Stone captured Springfield's technique as "a soft, sensual box (voice) that allowed her to combine syllables until they turned into pure cream". She had a finely tuned musical ear and extraordinary control of tone. She sang in a variety of styles, mostly pop, soul, folk, Latin, and rock'n'roll. Being able to wrap her voice around difficult material, her repertoire included songs that their writers ordinarily would have offered to black vocalists. In the 1960s, on several occasions, she performed as the only white singer on all-black bills. Her soul orientation was so convincing that early in her solo career, US listeners who had only heard her music on radio or records sometimes assumed that she was black. Later, a considerable number of critics observed that she sounded black and American or made a point of saying she did not.

Springfield consistently used her voice to upend commonly held beliefs on the expression of social identity through music. She did this by referencing a number of styles and singers, including Martha Reeves, Carole King, Aretha Franklin, Peggy Lee, Astrud Gilberto, and Mina. Springfield instructed UK backup musicians to capture the spirit of US musicians and copy their instrumental playing styles. However, the fact that she could neither read nor write music made it hard to communicate with session musicians. In the studio she was a perfectionist. Despite producing many tracks, she did not take credit for doing so. During extensive vocal sessions, she repeatedly recorded short phrases and single words. When recording songs, headphones were typically set as high in volume as possible – at a decibel level "on the threshold of pain".

The Philips Record company's studio was slated as "an extremely dead studio", where it felt as though it had turned the treble down: "There was no ambience and it was like singing in a padded cell. I had to get out of there". Springfield wound up recording in the ladies' toilets because of superior acoustics. Another example of refusal to use the studio is "I Close My Eyes and Count to Ten" – recorded at the end of a corridor.

== Personal life ==
Springfield's parents, Catherine and Gerard, lived in Hove, East Sussex from 1962. Catherine died in a nursing home there in 1974 of lung cancer. In 1979, Gerard died of a heart attack in Rottingdean, East Sussex.

A theme among journalists and Springfield's biographers is that she had two personalities: shy, quiet Mary O'Brien and the public face she had created as Dusty Springfield. An editorial review at Publishers Weekly of Valentine and Wickham's 2001 biography, Dancing with Demons, finds that "the confidence [Springfield] exuded on vinyl was a façade masking severe insecurities, addictions to drink and drugs, bouts of self-harm and fear of losing her career if exposed as a lesbian".

Simon Bell, one of Springfield's session singers, disputed the twin personality description, "It's very easy to decide there are two people, Mary and Dusty, but they were the one person. Dusty was most definitely Dusty right to the end". In her early career, much of her odd behaviour was seen as more or less in fun, described as a "wicked" sense of humour, including her food fights and hurling crockery down stairs. She had a great love for animals, particularly cats, and became an advocate for animal protection groups. She enjoyed reading maps and would intentionally get lost to navigate her way out. In the 1970s and early 1980s, Springfield's alcoholism and drug addiction affected her musical career. She was hospitalised several times for self-harm and was diagnosed with bipolar disorder.

Springfield was never reported to be in a heterosexual relationship; it meant the issue of her sexual orientation was raised frequently during her life. From mid-1966 to the early 1970s, Springfield lived in a domestic partnership with fellow singer Norma Tanega. In September 1970, Springfield told Ray Connolly of the Evening Standard:

Many other people say I'm bent and I've heard it so many times that I've almost learned to accept it ... I know I'm perfectly as capable of being swayed by a girl as by a boy. More and more people feel that way and I don't see why I shouldn't.

By the standards of 1970, that was a bold statement. Three years later, she told Chris Van Ness of the Los Angeles Free Press:

People are people ... I basically want to be straight ... I go from men to women, I don't give a shit. The catchphrase is: I can't love a man. Now, that's my hang-up. To love, to go to bed, fantastic but to love a man is my prime ambition ... They frighten me.

In the 1970s and 1980s, Springfield became involved in several romantic relationships with women in Canada and the United States that were not kept secret from the gay and lesbian community. From 1972 to 1978, she had an "off and on" domestic relationship with Faye Harris, an American photojournalist. In 1981, Springfield had a six-month relationship with singer-musician Carole Pope of the rock band Rough Trade.

In 1982, Springfield met an American actress, Teda Bracci, at Alcoholics Anonymous. They moved in together in April 1983. Seven months later, they exchanged vows at a wedding ceremony, which was not recognised under California law of the time. The pair had a "tempestuous" relationship, which led to an altercation with both ending up in hospital. Bracci hit Springfield in the mouth with a saucepan and knocked out her teeth, necessitating plastic surgery. They separated within two years.

== Illness and death ==
In January 1994, while recording her album A Very Fine Love in Nashville, Springfield began to feel ill. When she returned to England a few months later, her physicians diagnosed her with breast cancer. She received extensive chemotherapy and radiation treatment, and the cancer was found to be in remission. In 1995, in apparent good health, she set about promoting the album, which was released that year.

By the summer of 1996, the cancer had returned, and despite further treatment for almost three more years, Springfield died on 2 March 1999, aged 59, in Henley-on-Thames, Oxfordshire.

Springfield's funeral service was attended by hundreds of fans and people from the music business, including Elvis Costello, Lulu, and the Pet Shop Boys. It was held at the Anglican St Mary the Virgin church in Henley-on-Thames. A marker dedicated to her memory was placed in the church graveyard. In accordance with Springfield's wishes, she was cremated and some of her ashes were buried at Henley, while the rest were scattered by her brother, Tom Springfield, at the Cliffs of Moher in Ireland.

== Legacy ==
Springfield was inducted into the Rock and Roll Hall of Fame two weeks after her death. Her friend Elton John helped induct her into the Hall of Fame declaring, "I'm biased but I just think she was the greatest white singer there ever has been ... every song she sang, she claimed as her own".

Of the female singers of the British Invasion, Springfield made one of the biggest impressions on the US market, scoring 18 singles in the Billboard Hot 100 from 1964 to 1970 including six in the top 20. Quentin Tarantino caused a revival of interest in her music in 1994 by including "Son of a Preacher Man" on the Pulp Fiction soundtrack, which sold over three million copies. In the same year in the documentary Dusty Springfield: Full Circle, guests of her 1965 Sound of Motown show credited her efforts with helping to popularise US soul music in the UK. In 2008, country/blues singer-songwriter Shelby Lynne recorded a tribute album featuring ten of Springfield's songs and one original. The album, titled Just a Little Lovin', featured two tracks selected from Springfield's debut, four from Dusty in Memphis and four from her back catalogue. Lynne's album received critical acclaim, charted at number 41 on the US Billboard Charts and was nominated for a Grammy Award for Best Engineered Album (Non-Classical).

Springfield was popular in Europe and performed at the Sanremo Music Festival. Recordings were released in French, German, and Italian. Her French works include a 1964 four-track extended play with "Demain tu peux changer" (also known as "Will You Still Love Me Tomorrow"), "Je ne peux pas t'en vouloir" ("Losing You"), "L'été est fini" ("Summer is Over"), and "Reste encore un instant" ("Stay Awhile"). German recordings include the July 1964 single, "Warten und hoffen" ("Wishin' and Hopin'") backed with "Auf dich nur wart' ich immerzu" ("I Only Want to Be with You"). Italian recordings include "Tanto so che poi mi passa" ("Every Day I Have to Cry") issued as a single. Her entries at the Sanremo festival were "Tu che ne sai" and "Di fronte all'amore" ("I Will Always Want You"). Springfield is known to have brought many little-known soul singers to the attention of a wider UK record-buying audience. In April 1965, she hosted a special Motown edition of the hugely popular British TV music series Ready Steady Go!, featuring the first national TV performances of many top-selling Motown artists. Although her music was not directly associated with the British music/dance movement northern soul, her efforts were seen as a contributing factor in the formation of the genre.

Springfield is considered to be a cultural icon of the Swinging Sixties, where she "was an instantly recognisable celebrity". In public and on stage, she developed a joyful image supported by her peroxide-blonde bouffant hairstyle, evening gowns and heavy make-up that included her much-copied "panda eye" mascara. She borrowed elements of her look from blonde glamour queens such as Brigitte Bardot and Catherine Deneuve and pasted them together according to her own taste. By the 1990s, she had become a camp icon, especially with her ultra-glamorous look and this, combined with her emotive vocal performances, won her an enduring following in the gay community. Besides being a prototypical female for drag queens, she was presented in the roles of the 'Great White Lady' of pop and soul and the 'Queen of Mods'.

== Awards and tributes ==
Springfield is an inductee of the US Rock and Roll Hall of Fame (1999), the UK Music Hall of Fame (2006), and the National Rhythm & Blues Hall of Fame (2023). She was named among the top 25 female artists of all time by readers of Mojo magazine (May 1999), editors of Q magazine (January 2002), and a panel of artists on VH1 TV channel (August 2007). In 2008, she appeared at No. 35 on the Rolling Stone's "100 Greatest Singers of All Time". In the 1960s she topped a number of popularity polls, including Melody Maker's Best International Vocalist for 1966; in 1965 she was the first British singer to top the New Musical Express readers' polls for Female Singer topping that poll again in 1966, 1967, and 1969 as well as getting the most votes in the British Singer category from 1964 to 1966. Her album Dusty in Memphis has been listed among the greatest albums of all time by Rolling Stone and in polls by VH1 artists, New Musical Express readers, and the Channel 4 viewers; in 2001 she received the Grammy Hall of Fame award.

In March 1999, Springfield was scheduled to receive her award at Buckingham Palace as an officer of the Order of the British Empire, given for "services to popular music". Due to the recurrence of the singer's breast cancer, officials of Queen Elizabeth II gave permission for the medal to be collected earlier in January, by Wickham and it was presented to Springfield in hospital with a small group of friends and relatives attending. She died on the day that she would have collected her award from the Palace. Various films and stage musicals have been created or proposed to commemorate her life. On 12 January 2006 an Australian stage musical, Dusty – The Original Pop Diva, received its world premiere at the State Theatre of the Victorian Arts Centre in Melbourne. In May 2008, actress Nicole Kidman was announced as the star and producer of a biographical film, but in July 2012 it had yet to surface. Another reported candidate for a role as Springfield was Madonna in a TV film project. Universal Pictures scheduled a biopic with Kristin Chenoweth in the starring role. However, according to Chenoweth in January 2012, the project's status was in limbo and the "script … needed a lot of work".

In 1970, US jazz singer-pianist Blossom Dearie recorded a tribute song, "Dusty Springfield", on her album That's Just the Way I Want to Be – it was co-written by Dearie, Tanega (Springfield's then-partner), and Jim Council. UK singer-songwriter David Westlake on his 2002 release, Play Dusty for Me, "fêted [Springfield] in both the album title and opening title track". US singer-songwriter Shelby Lynne's tenth studio album, Just a Little Lovin' (2008), was issued as a tribute. In 2012, a biographical jukebox musical titled Forever Dusty opened Off-Broadway in New York City at New World Stages. The production starred Kirsten Holly Smith as Springfield; Smith also co-wrote the book of the musical. In 2015, Springfield was named by Equality Forum as being one of their 31 Icons of the 2015 LGBT History Month. On 8 November 2022, she was honoured with a Google Doodle to celebrate her life and career.

== Discography ==
- A Girl Called Dusty (1964)
- Stay Awhile/I Only Want to Be with You (1964)
- Dusty (1964)
- Ooooooweeee!!! (1965)
- Ev'rything's Coming Up Dusty (1965)
- You Don't Have to Say You Love Me (1966)
- Where Am I Going? (1967)
- The Look of Love (1967)
- Dusty... Definitely (1968)
- Dusty in Memphis (1969)
- A Brand New Me (1970)
- See All Her Faces (1972)
- Cameo (1973)
- It Begins Again (1978)
- Living Without Your Love (1979)
- White Heat (1982)
- Reputation (1990)
- A Very Fine Love (1995)
- Faithful (2015, recorded in 1971)
- Longing (2025, recorded in 1974)

== Filmography ==
Springfield was the presenter or host of several TV musical series:

Year	Title	Notes
1965	"The Sound of Motown"	Special episode of Ready Steady Go!
1966–67	"Dusty"	Two seasons each of six weekly parts
1968	"It Must Be Dusty"	Eight regular weekly episodes and followed by a Christmas special, All Kinds of Music
1969	"Decidedly Dusty"	Eight weekly episodes

=== UK TV series ===
==== Dusty – Series 1 (1966) ====
Produced by Stanley Dorfman. Musical director: Johnny Pearson. Broadcast Thursdays on BBC1 at 9:00 pm (Except Episode 4 at 9:05 pm)

No. overall	No. in series	Backing vocals	Special guests	First broadcast
1	1	The Dudley Moore Trio with Chris Karan on drums and Pete McGurk on bass	Madeline Bell, Lesley Duncan and Maggie Stredder	18 August 1966
2	2	Milt Kamen	Madeline Bell, Lesley Duncan and Maggie Stredder	25 August 1966
3	3	Woody Allen	Madeline Bell, Lesley Duncan and Maggie Stredder	1 September 1966
4	4	The Four Freshmen	Madeline Bell, Lesley Duncan and Barbara Moore	8 September 1966
5	5	Peter Cook	Madeline Bell, Lesley Duncan and Barbara Moore	15 September 1966
6	6	Señor Wences	Madeline Bell, Lesley Duncan and Maggie Stredder	22 September 1966

==== Dusty – Series 2 (1967) ====
Produced by Stanley Dorfman. Backing vocals: Madeline Bell, Lesley Duncan and Maggie Stredder. Musical director: Johnny Pearson. Broadcast Tuesdays on BBC1 at 9:05 pm

No. overall	No. in series	Special guests	Original release date
7	1	Warren Mitchell and Ken Campbell	15 August 1967
8	2	Mel Tormé	22 August 1967
9	3	Jose Feliciano	29 August 1967
10	4	Tom Jones	5 September 1967
11	5	Los Machucambos	12 September 1967
12	6	Scott Walker	19 September 1967

==== It Must Be Dusty – Series 1 (1968) ====
Produced by ATV. Broadcast on ITV. Producer Colin Clews.

No. overall	No. in series	Guest	Original release date
1	1	Scott Walker	10 May 1968
2	2	Mark Murphy. Esther & Abi Ofarim were billed to appear, but were not in the broadcast.	17 May 1968
3	3	Donovan	24 May 1968
4	4	Georgie Fame	31 May 1968
Postponed until Monday 24 June by London ITV station Rediffusion.
5	5	Tom Springfield & Julie Felix	7 June 1968
6	6	The Jimi Hendrix Experience	14 June 1968
7	7	Manfred Mann	21 June 1968

==== Show of the Week: Dusty at The Talk of the Town ====
No. overall	No. in series	Title	Directed by	Written by	Original release date
--	1	"Dusty at the Talk of the Town"	Stanley Dorfman	Unknown	Sunday 15 September 1968 at 7:25 pm on BBC2
Dusty Springfield returns to the scene of her recent cabaret triumph. Orchestra directed by Johnny Pearson. Vocal backing: Lesley Duncan, Kay Garner & Sue Weetman. Choreography by Tommy Tucker.

==== Christmas Special ====
No. overall	No. in series	Title	Directed by	Original release date
--	1	"All Kinds Of Music"	Unknown	25 December 1968 ITV
Dusty's Christmas Special with guests Trio Athénée, The Tremeloes, Malcolm Roberts, Kiki Dee, The Spinners, David Snell and Des Ryan. Produced by ATV for ITV. Broadcast 2:00 - 3:00 pm

==== Decidedly Dusty – Series 1 (1969) ====
Produced by Mel Cornish. Introduced by Valentine Dyall. Dancers: Cassandra Mahon & Peter Newton. Choreographer: Ruth Pearson. Vocal backing: Kay Garner, Lesley Duncan & Madeline Bell. Musical associate: Larry Ashmore. Musical Director: Johnny Pearson. Broadcast Tuesdays on BBC1 at 7:30 pm

No. overall	No. in series	Special guest(s)	Written by	Original release date
13	1	Spike Milligan	Joe Steeples & Spike Mullins	9 September 1969
14	2	Jimmy Ruffin	Joe Steeples & Spike Mullins	16 September 1969
15	3	Danny La Rue	Joe Steeples & Spike Mullins	23 September 1969
16	4	The Bee Gees	Joe Steeples & Spike Mullins	30 September 1969
17	5	Dr.Murray Banks	Joe Steeples & Spike Mullins	7 October 1969
18	6	Frida Boccara & Percy Edwards	Joe Steeples & Spike Mullins	14 October 1969
19	7	Shari Lewis	Joe Steeples & Spike Mullins	21 October 1969

=== TV specials ===
No. in series	Title	Directed by	Original release date
1	"Music My Way"	Colin Charman	18 July 1973 BBC1
The first in a series of eight shows starring singers from Britain and the Continent. Tonight Dusty Springfield gives a concert performance featuring some of her biggest hits. Musical direction Johnny Pearson.
1	"Dusty"	Roger Pomphrey	2 May 1994 BBC1
In this film biography of Dusty Springfield, she is interviewed and frequently interrupted by Dawn French and Jennifer Saunders, but she still manages to talk about her life and her music.
1	"Definitely Dusty"	Serena Cross	26 December 1999 BBC2
Documentary charting the career of diva Dusty Springfield, who died in March, from Catholic schoolgirl to superstar.
1	"Dusty Springfield's Rock Shrine"	Unknown	15 October 2000 BBC Choice
Repeated multiple times on BBC Choice and BBC Three.
1	"Celebrity Relics: Dusty Springfield's Dresses"	Unknown	7 June 2001 BBC Choice
Repeated multiple times on BBC Choice and BBC Three.
