= The Echoes (English group) =

English musical group (1959–1971)

- The Echoes. Isle of Man, 1962

Background information
- Origin: East London, England
- Genres: Beat, rock, pop, soul
- Years active: 1959–1971
- Labels: Fontana, Philips

The Echoes were an English musical group, established in London in early 1960 by singer Chris Wayne, for the Johnny Preston, Conway Twitty and Freddy Cannon tour of Great Britain. During the period 1960 to 1971, the Echoes toured extensively throughout the United Kingdom and elsewhere in the world, playing for various artists and providing the backing on many recordings.

== Early days ==
The Echoes were originally made up from 'The Spacemen Skiffle Group', which was Joe Brown's skiffle group. Brown was a regular on the 1959 Boy Meets Girls, a television show with Marty Wilde. The Spacemen had no other work while Brown was contracted to do the show, so they were able to undertake a tour with Chris Wayne as "The Echoes". Their original line up was Chris Wayne (vocals), Tony Oakman (rhythm guitar), George Staff (rhythm guitar), Peter Oakman (bass), and Bert Crome (drums). As Joe Brown was usually their lead guitarist, Dave Burns took his place.

After the tour with Johnny Preston, Conway Twitty and Freddy Cannon, the Echoes disbanded with Tony Oakman, George Staff, Peter Oakman, and Bert Crome returning to Joe Brown as his backing group, The Bruvvers. Later Oakman went on to play bass for Lonnie Donegan, which he did until Donegan's death. Wayne continued to work solo whilst Burns went to work with Wee Willie Harris in Italy.

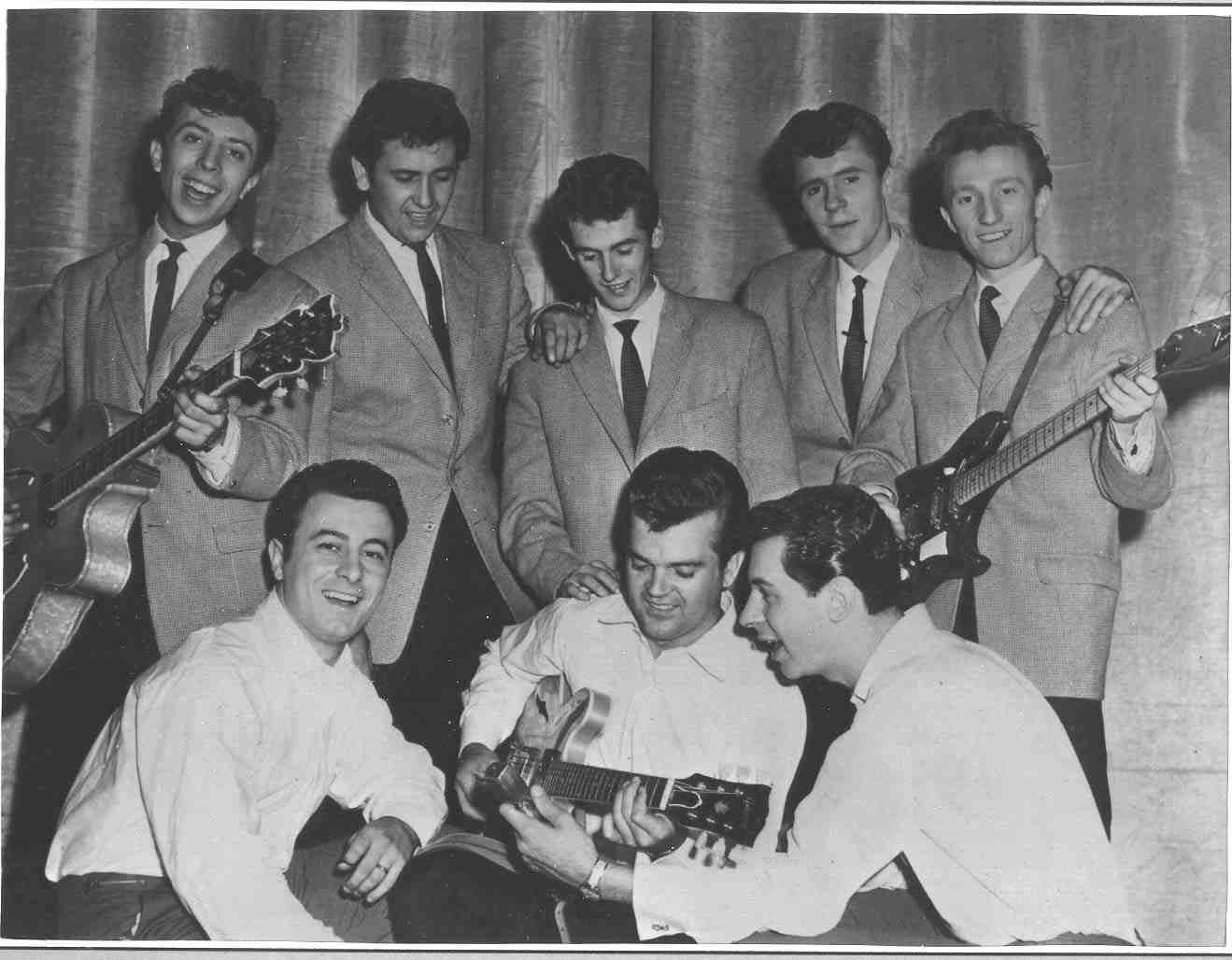
The Echoes tour with Conway Twiity, Freddie Cannon & Johnny Preston (1960)

Chris Wayne and the Echoes

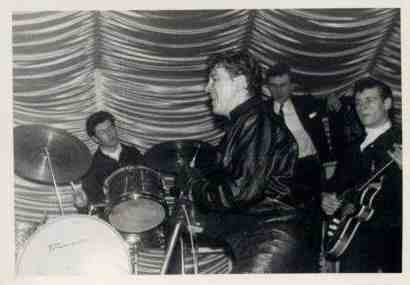
Gene Vincent on stage with The Echoes (1961)

== 1961 ==
Chris Wayne had another tour planned, this time with Gene Vincent, so he decided to reform The Echoes. Wayne had a drummer, Laurie Jay, but needed guitar, piano and bass. The Dynamos agreed to do this tour as The Echoes, as they had recently parted from Sonny Stewart. They became The Echoes to accompany Gene Vincent when he visited Britain at the beginning of 1961. The line up of this group was Laurie Jay (drums), Tony Collins (guitar), Les Smith (piano) and Douggie Reece (bass). During this tour Tony Collins had a car accident and was unable to continue. For the remainder of the tour he was replaced by Big Jim Sullivan. After the tour, it was decided to continue the Echoes, as with their ability to stand alone as a band and to also play for other artists, meant that work, including touring, was assured. Les Smith (piano) left the group after the tour to continue his career as an architect. His replacement was Ian Hines (piano), brother of Frazer Hines who played Jamie in the Doctor Who television series. Collins was unable to continue after his accident, so Billy Kuy became the new guitarist. Another national tour ensued with Frankie Howerd, The Mudlarks and Matt Monro. In late August, Kuy left to join The Outlaws and was briefly replaced by the 16 years old Vic Briggs, who was on his school holidays and could only participate for three weeks. His first gig with The Echoes was a variety show at the Royalty Theatre in Chester. The Echoes need to find a more permanent replacement, and the returning Dave Burns took the role. Hines also left to work in Hamburg, and was replaced by Perry Ford. On New Year's Eve in 1961, The Echoes accompanied Bert Weedon on the television show Sunday Night at the London Palladium. The others on that show were Eve Boswell, Alma Cogan, Lonnie Donegan, Vera Lynn, Garry Miller, Cliff Richard, Roy Castle, Ronnie Carroll, Cleo Laine, Bert Weedon and The Echoes, Bruce Forsyth (compere), and Jack Parnell and his Orchestra. After this appearance The Echoes were approached by Vox, who eventually sponsored them from 1962 until 1971 with all the group's equipment. Perry left in early 1962 to pursue his own career and Hines, back from Hamburg, rejoined the group for a short while.

== 1962 ==
In January 1962, the Echoes undertook a two-day concert tour with The Temperance Seven, Shane Fenton and the Fentones, Vince Eager, Michael Cox, Johnny Gentle, and Nero & the Gladiators. Another concert followed in February with Johnny Kidd & the Pirates. In April, a national concert tour started with The Temperance Seven, Chas McDevitt and Shirley Douglas and Bert Weedon, and this led to a concert tour starting on 29 April with Jerry Lee Lewis, Johnny Kidd & the Pirates, The Viscounts, Vince Eager, Mark Eden, Danny Storm, Buddy Britten and Dave Reid. Before the final show at the Tower Ballroom, New Brighton, Laurie Jay announced his departure. A drummer was needed that night, and they recruited Ringo Starr, who had just returned from Hamburg after playing for Rory Storm and The Hurricanes. Jay went into management, later becoming the manager for Billy Ocean and Shirley Bassey. On returning to London, Tommy Frost became The Echoes' new drummer. After this tour Hines also left for Hamburg again, and was replaced by Ray Murray on keyboards. By May 1962, the Echoes line up became Dave Burns (guitar), Tommy Frost (drums), Ray Murray (keyboards), and Douggie Reece (bass). The Echoes performed a summer season in Douglas, Isle of Man in the "Star Parade of 1962", a rock and roll concert at The Crescent Pavilion. During the day they were required to play at The Palace Ballroom, playing relief for Ronnie Aldrich and The Squadronaires during the band's breaks. With the completion of the summer season, the Echoes returned to London and a meeting had been arranged with Mike Collier, who had just returned to England, after several years working in the music industry in America. He wanted to put together a team for his company, Micol Productions, and wanted the Echoes to be the rhythm section for his productions. Together with the arranger, Al Saxon, they began their association with Micol Productions. This led to the release on their first of four singles "Sounds Like Winter" in November 1962 on the Fontana. Other records for Micol Productions were released on Decca, Columbia and Fontana. The Echoes had already played at The Cavern Club in Liverpool, but on 3 September, they performed on the same bill as The Beatles. The year ended with a tour this time with B. Bumble and the Stingers, Bert Weedon, Johnny Kidd & the Pirates, Tommy Bruce, Michael Cox and Vince Eager. Other concerts to see out the year were with Adam Faith, Gene Vincent, Joe Brown and The Tornados.

== 1963 ==
Early in 1963, the Echoes appeared at dance venues and concerts with Susan Maughan after her hit "Bobby's Girl", as well as continuing working with Bert Weedon. In April they took part in a national tour with Billy Fury, the Tornados, Mike Preston, Dickie Pride, Mike and Tony Nevitt plus Larry Burns. After a summer season playing at the Watersplash in Jersey, some of the band members decided to pursue their own dreams. Burns went on to form a duo with his wife. Frost decided to stay in Jersey for a while. Pete Clifford from the Jesters took Burns place on guitar. Shortly after the group returned to London, Murray left to go back to Scotland. The line-up for an audition to play for Dusty Springfield was Douggie Reece (bass), Micky Garrett (organ), Martin Gibbs (stand-in drummer for Frost) and Pete Clifford (lead guitar). After the audition, Bob Wackett replaced Frost on drums. Consequently, Springfield's first Echoes comprised Reece, Garrett, Wackett, and Clifford.

== 1964 ==
Throughout 1964, many shows were undertaken with Springfield (including the tour of Australia with Gerry & the Pacemakers, Gene Pitney, Brian Poole and The Tremeloes), as well as a tour of America, this time with The Searchers and Eden Kane. Wackett stayed with the Echoes until just before the South African Springfield tour in December 1964, when Johnny Dryden replaced him. Clifford remained with the Echoes until the end of this tour, and then left to join 004 and he returned to South Africa.

== 1965 ==
Both Clifford and Garrett departed to form their own group in early 1965. Clifford subsequently played with The 004, Floribunda Rose and The Bats. Their replacements were Vic Briggs (guitar) and Jimmy O'Brien (keyboards). Springfield wanted to add a front line and more rhythm section to the group, so the line-up became Ian Harper (trumpet 1), Derek Andrews (trumpet 2), Derek Wadsworth (trombone), Tony Scott (percussion), Vic Briggs (guitar), Jimmy O'Brien (keyboards), Johnny Dryden (drums), and Douggie Reece (bass). All the backing vocals were done by the group at this time, although later Springfield got her own female vocal group for most of her big shows. These singers included Madeline Bell, Kiki Dee, Lesley Duncan, and Kay Garner, among others. The first half of 1965 was taken up by packet show tours. In June and July 1965, the Echoes, along with Doris Troy and Madeline Bell, backed Springfield on her second album, Ev'rything's Coming Up Dusty, released in October that year. In early August Peter Wolf replaced Dryden on drums, and Gary Boyle replaced Briggs, who had left to join Steampacket. The line-up became Boyle (guitar), O'Brien (keyboards), Wolf (drums) and Reece (bass), whilst still retaining the brass section, percussion and vocal group. On 31 August the Echoes drove through Europe to Rome, Italy to play at The Piper Club for one month.

== 1966 ==
Through January there were a series of Ballroom engagements. February a ballroom tour of Ireland. April cabaret shows at the Northern Clubs and a concerts in Stockholm. May with more Northern Clubs cabaret show.

Jimmy O'Brien resigned being replaced by Mike O'Neil on keyboards. On 1 May that year, the Echoes backed Springfield at the Empire Pool, on a bill that included the Beatles, Small Faces, the Spencer Davis Group, Roy Orbison, The Walker Brothers, the Yardbirds, Cliff Richard and the Shadows, Herman's Hermits, Dave Dee, Dozy, Beaky, Mick & Tich, the Who and the Rolling Stones. Later that year Boyle also left the Echoes and replaced Briggs position in Steampacket, after Briggs had joined The Animals. Boyle went on to form the jazz fusion band, Isotope. Stuart Taylor became the Echoes new guitarist. Don Shinn then became The Echoes keyboard player.

== 1967 ==
The line-up then consisted of Taylor (guitarist), Shinn (keyboards), Wolf (drums) and Reece (bass), still with the brass section, percussion and vocal group. During late 1966 through to 1967, the Echoes provided backing work for Lulu. In July, together with Lulu, they were the support act for The Monkees at the Empire Pool. The Echoes also played backing the Monkees' solo spots during the concert. Shinn left later that year and was replaced by Ivan Chandler on keyboards. Taylor also left the group, replaced by Paul Hodgeson on guitar.

== 1968 ==
Chandler was only with the band for a short time, and his replacement, Chris Sparrow, recorded the lead vocal on "Searching for You Baby" while he was with the band. He left the Echoes at the end of their tour supporting Herman's Hermits and Amen Corner, and was replaced by Brian Bennett. In June 1968, the Echoes complete with the brass section, were on another tour with Herman's Hermits with Amen Corner, plus Paper Dolls and John Rowles. The Echoes opened the second half and played back up for John Rowles. During the tour Rowles asked if he could use the Echoes when they were not playing with Springfield. As Springfield was cutting back on her live performances, the offer was accepted and they toured with Rowles later that year, playing with him until mid 1970. Rowles used the Echoes bassist, Douggie Reece, as his musical director. This meant that the Echoes had to use another bass player when Reece had other commitments with Rowles. Some of the Echoes were offered the job of playing in the band for Hair, at The Shaftesbury Theatre in London's West End, when it opened on 27 September 1968. Woolf, Hodgeson, Bennett plus the brass section left the Echoes to play in the band for Hair. Later Bennett became musical director for the Hair touring company.

This left Reece with a dilemma, as the Echoes were still committed to many bookings. To fulfil these, other members were found. They were Rod Stone (guitar), Tweed Harris (keyboards) both from an Australian group The Groove, plus Don Burrell (drums) with Reece picking up the brass players from the local musicians.

From 1962 to 1968, the Echoes had recorded seven singles in their own right.

== 1969–1971 ==
With the new musicians in the Echoes they were able to complete all their work. Stone and Harris were still able to play with the Groove, and Burrell could undertake gigs he had, as well as with Rowles. The Echoes partook in a cruise booking with The Chantels, but only as a trio comprising Ian Heinz (keyboard), Peter Curtin (drums) and Reece (bass).

Early in 1971, the Echoes were disbanded. In April that year, Reece married Wendy Cook from the Australian female vocal group Marcie and The Cookies. Later that year they went to live in Melbourne, Australia, and Reece became an arranger and record producer and, for many years, played in the Burlington Lodge Group.

== Legacy ==
Gideon Coe played the track, "Marchin' Thru", by the Echoes on 19 November 2019 on BBC Radio 6 Music.

== Discography ==
=== The Echoes ===
- 1962 : "Cloak and Dagger" / "Sounds Like Winter" – Fontana 267254 TF
- 1963 : "The Happy Whistler" / "Sticks & Stones" – Fontana 267279 TF 392
- 1963 : "Marchin' Thru" / "The Jog" – Fontana 267300 TF 415
- 1964 : "My Little Girl" / "More" – Fontana 267320 TF 439
- 1964 : "Don't You Believe Them" / "I'll Get Over You" – Philips BF 1370
- 1966 : "Got to Run" / "Thanks a Lot" – Philips BF 1480
- 1967 : 'Stick to me Like Glue' (not released)
- 1968 : "Searching for You Baby" / "Listen to Me Baby" – Philips BF 1683

=== Other artists ===
- 1961 : Vince Taylor - "What Cha Gonna Do" / "Move Over Tiger" - Pallette PG 9020
- 1962 : Bobby Allen – "Your Cheatin' Heart" / "I'll Forget About You" – Fontana 267252 TF
- 1963 : Bobbi Carol - "It Doesn't Matter" / "Will You Love Me Tomorrow" - Fontana 267260 TF
- 1963 : Bert Weedon – "Night Cry" / "Charlie Boy" – His Master's Voice Pop 1141
- 1963 : Bobby Allen – "Here Comes the Bride" / "Nothing's Impossible" – Fontana 267288 TF
- 1963 : Wendy Walker – "Window Shopping" / "There Ain't a Boy in the World" – Decca F-11573
- 1963 : Wendy Walker – "Boys Will Be Boys" / "Casanova" – Decca F-11671
- 1963 : The Triffids – "Lookin' Around" / "She's No Longer Your Girl" – Columbia DB 7084
- 1963 : Frazer Hines – "Wallaby Sue" – Planet MPA 555
- 1964 : Dusty Springfield – "Can I Get a Witness" – Philips BF 12564
- 1965 : Dusty Springfield – "In the Middle of Nowhere" – Philips BF 1418
- 1965 : Dusty Springfield – Ev'rything's Coming Up Dusty (album) – Philips SRBL 102
  - 1965 : "Won't Be Long"
  - 1965 : "La Bamba"
  - 1965 : "If It Don't Work Out"
  - 1965 : "I Can't Hear You No More"
  - 1965 : "Packin' Up"
- 1966 : Dusty Springfield – "Little By Little" – Philips BF 1466
- 1966 : Dusty Springfield – "Every Ounce of Strength" – Philips BF 1482
- 1966 : Dusty Springfield – "Go Ahead On" – Philips BF 1510
- 1967 : Dusty Springfield – "Take Me for a Little While" – Philips SBL 7737

=== Other tracks ===
- "Needle in a Haystack" – Dusty Springfield (on her 1996 double CD compilation, Something Special)
- "Heartbeat" – Dusty Springfield (on her 1994 four CD compilation, Dusty: The Legend Of Dusty Springfield)

== Bibliography ==
- Lucy O'Brien (1989). Dusty. Sidgwick & Jackson. ISBN 978-0283063473.
- Penny Valentine; Vicki Wickham (2000). Dancing with Demons: The Authorised Biography of Dusty Springfield. Hodder & Stoughton. ISBN 978-0340766743.
- Paul Howes (2001). The Complete Dusty Springfield. Reynolds & Hearn. ISBN 978-1905287871.
- 50 Years of British Pop, The 20th Century in Pictures. Press Association / Ammonite Press. 2009. ISBN 9781906672287.
- Karen Bartlett (2014). Dusty: An Intimate Portrait of a Musical Legend. The Robson Press. ISBN 978-1849548762.
