= Ivor Raymonde =

British musician, songwriter, arranger, and actor (1926–1990)

Ivor Raymonde (born Ivor Pomerance; 22 October 1926 – 4 June 1990) was a British musician, songwriter, arranger and actor, best known for his distinctive rock-orchestral arrangements for Dusty Springfield and others in the 1960s.

== Life and career ==
He studied at Trinity College of Music, and served as a Bevin Boy during the Second World War. He initially entered professional music as a jazz and classical pianist. He played in various big bands and started leading his own band by the early 1950s. He then became a music director at the BBC alongside Wally Stott. He worked as a session musician on occasion, playing on and arranging Johnny Duncan's UK hit "Last Train to San Fernando." He also worked as an actor, supporting comedian Tony Hancock in all of the comedian's first TV series in 1956.

He moved on to Philips Records, where he worked as producer with Frankie Vaughan, for whom he arranged the hits "Tower of Strength" and "Loop de Loop", and with Marty Wilde and the Springfields.

When Dusty Springfield went solo in 1963, he played her a tune he had written, which became her first big hit, "I Only Want to Be with You", produced by Johnny Franz. It reached #4 on the UK singles chart, and he and lyricist Mike Hawker followed it up with Dusty's second hit single, "Stay Awhile". Raymonde continued working as Springfield's arranger through the 1960s, as well as arranging and producing hits for Helen Shapiro, Billy Fury, the Walker Brothers, Susan Maughan, Ken Dodd, Alan Price, Honeybus, Eternal Triangle, Los Bravos, The Flies and many others. In the 1970s, he worked as an arranger and producer at DJM Records on albums by the actor Edward Woodward, and later worked with Ian Dury, Julio Iglesias and Richard Anthony.

He had four children: Gail, Linda and Nicholas, and Simon Raymonde of Cocteau Twins, co-founder and manager of the independent record label Bella Union.

A compilation of Ivor Raymonde's recordings, Paradise: The Sound of Ivor Raymonde, was released on the Bella Union label in 2018, and made available on Bandcamp. A second volume was issued in 2019.
