= Margie (disambiguation) =

Margie is a feminine nickname and given name.

Margie may also refer to:

- "Margie" (song), a 1920 jazz standard by Con Conrad, J. Russel Robinson and Benny Davis
- Margie (TV series), a 1960s situation comedy
- Margie (1946 film), a film starring Jeanne Crain
- Margie (1940 film), an American comedy film
- Margie, Minnesota, United States, an unincorporated community
- Margie, Alberta, Canada, a locality
- Margie (journal), a literary journal also known as American Journal of Poetry

== See also ==
- Margi
- Margy
- Marji
