= No Contact Apprehension Policy =

Traffic management policy in the Philippines

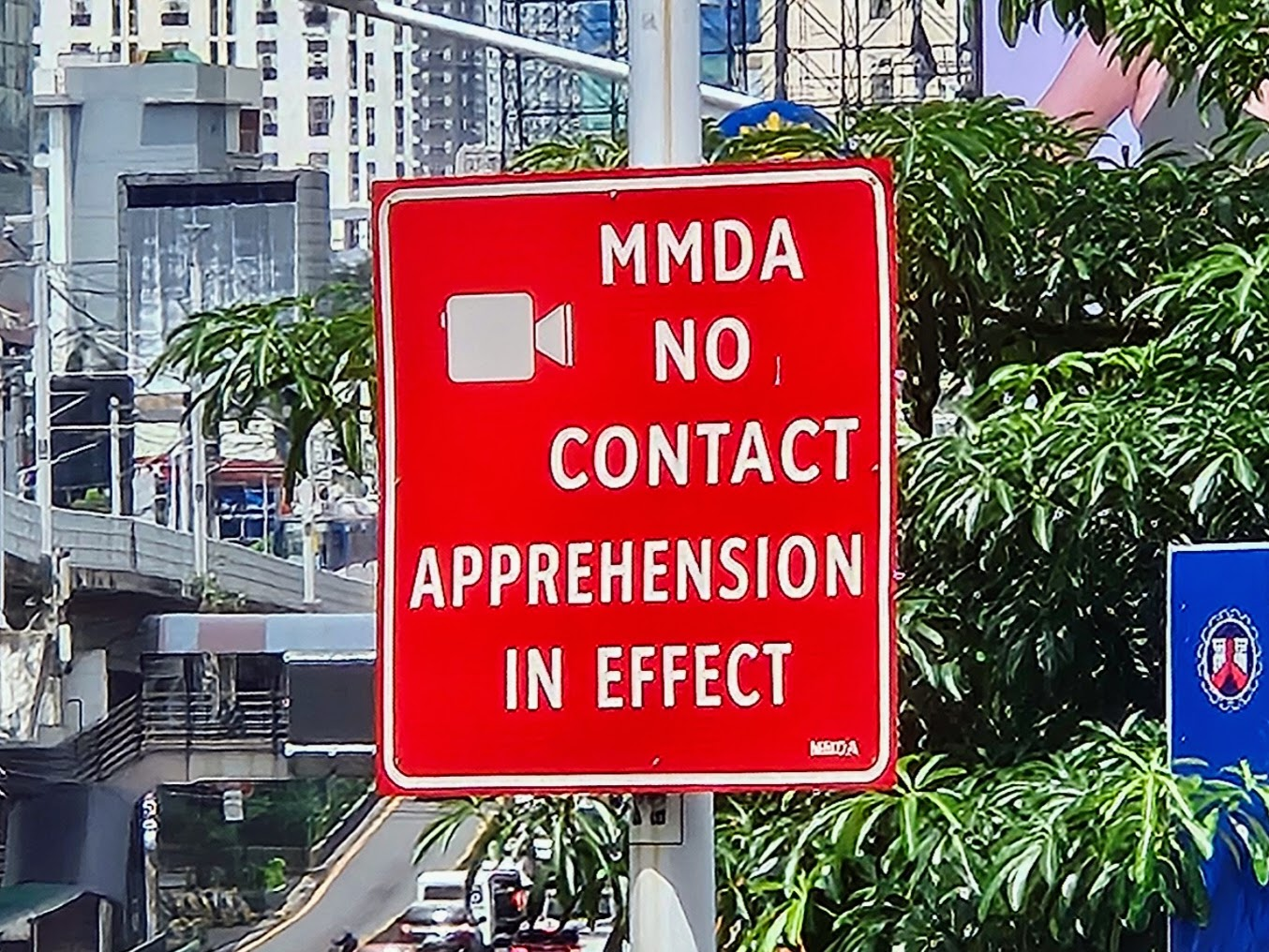
A sign informing motorists of the implementation of MMDA's No Contact Apprehension Program.

The No Contact Apprehension Policy (NCAP) refers to different active traffic management and road traffic safety measures being implemented by local government units all over the Philippines.

Through the NCAP, traffic management agencies are able to enforce traffic laws by identifying violators through the use of traffic enforcement cameras and closed-circuit television. In doing so, it is also able to apprehend violators without the presence of an on-site traffic enforcer.

On August 30, 2022, the Supreme Court of the Philippines issued a temporary restraining order suspending the No Contact Apprehension Policy of the Metropolitan Manila Development Authority (MMDA) and the cities of Manila, Quezon City, Valenzuela, Parañaque, and Muntinlupa. The order also temporarily bars the Land Transportation Office (LTO) from providing motorist information to other local government units implementing a No Contact Apprehension Policy. Following an urgent motion by the MMDA, the Supreme Court partially lifted the temporary restraining order on the MMDA NCAP on May 20, 2025.

== Implementations ==
=== Metropolitan Manila Development Authority ===
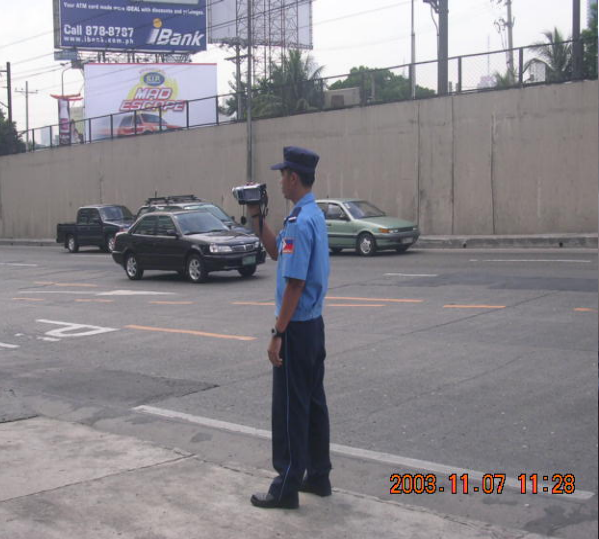
A MMDA traffic enforcer enforcing the Non-Physical Contact Apprehension policy along EDSA in 2003.

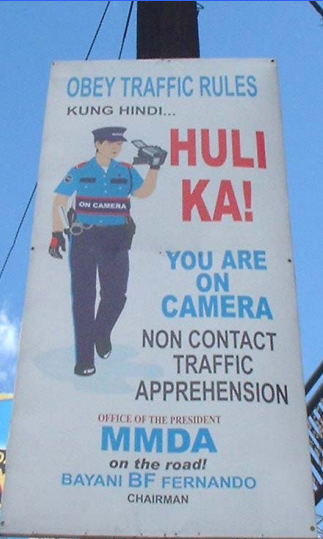
A tarpaulin informing the enforcement of the Non-Physical Contact Apprehension policy.

The Metropolitan Manila Development Authority (MMDA) was the first government body to implement a No Contact Apprehension Policy in the Philippines. On November 7, 2002, the Metro Manila Council authorized the Metropolitan Manila Development Authority (MMDA) in MMDA Resolution No. 02–49 to adopt plans to implement a "Non-Physical Contact Apprehension" policy in apprehending traffic violators in Metro Manila identified with the use of digital cameras. The resolution stresses that the policy would reduce instances of traffic extortion and bribery of enforcers, as well as to avoid traffic build-up from physically apprehending violators.

In 2003, the implementing guidelines for the No Physical Contact Policy were laid out in MMDA Memorandum Circular No. 5, where MMDA enforcers would be issued digital cameras to take pictures of traffic violators which may be used as a basis for traffic violations and the fines thereof.

On January 21, 2009, a new No Physical Contact Policy was prescribed by the MMDA for a 90-day trial period through MMDA Resolution No. 09-02. Additional trial runs were conducted after, with a six-month trial run was conducted through MMDA Resolution No. 09–07 on July 23, 2009 and another six-month trial run through MMDA Resolution No. 10–02 on January 21, 2010.

The program was permanently reinstated as the No Physical Contact Apprehension policy (also known as the No Contact Apprehension Program) as it is known today on February 16, 2016, through MMDA Resolution No. 16-01, which implements the policy along major thoroughfares of Metro Manila, particularly along EDSA and Circumferential Road 5 with the added use of closed-circuit television (CCTV) traffic cameras. The MMDA NCAP covers various major roads in Metro Manila, such as EDSA, Circumferential Road 5 including Katipunan Avenue, Marcos Highway, Roxas Boulevard, Commonwealth Avenue, Quezon Avenue, West Avenue, E. Rodriguez Avenue, and Buendia Avenue, among others.

=== Other implementations ===
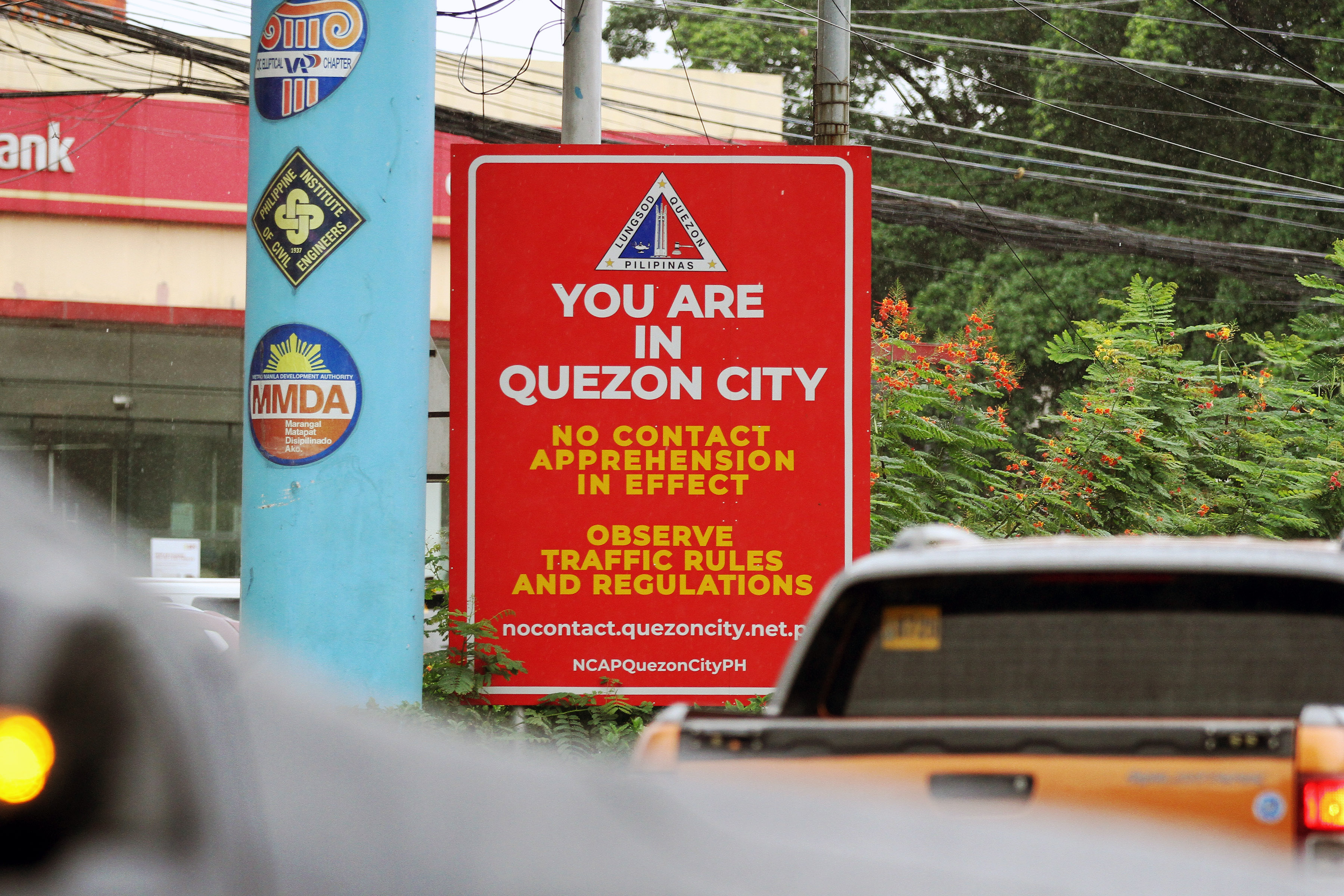
A sign along Quezon Avenue informing motorists of the implementation of Quezon City's No Contact Apprehension Program.

Since the implementation of the MMDA's No Physical Contact Apprehension policy, other local government units around the Philippines have also carried out their own versions of the policy.

In 2018, Parañaque became the first local government unit in the country to implement a fully unmanned traffic apprehension system. The system makes uses of high repetition cameras and US-developed radar technology. This was followed a year later by Valenzuela, which launched its No Contact Apprehension Program in September 2019.

In December 2020, the Manila City Council enacted Manila City Ordinance No. 8676, allowing the Manila Traffic and Parking Bureau (MTPB) to issue traffic tickets to motorists caught violating traffic laws on traffic enforcement cameras without the physical apprehension of an on-site traffic enforcer.

In September 2021, the city of Cauayan, Isabela, became the first city outside of Metro Manila to adopt a No Contact Apprehension Program, which it implemented along major thoroughfares of Cauayan. This was followed by the province of Bataan in November 2021, which launched its own No Contact Apprehension Program along its main thoroughfare, the Roman Superhighway. In October 2021, the Muntinlupa City Council passed Muntinlupa City Ordinance 2021–280, enacting a No Contact Apprehension Program in the city. However, as of 2022, the ordinance has not yet been implemented.

Following a dry run from October 2021 to June 2022, Quezon City announced the full implementation of its No Contact Apprehension Program on July 1, 2022, along 15 major roads in the city. The city of San Juan also plans to implement a Non-Contact Apprehension Program within the city starting August 2022.

The Cavite–Laguna Expressway (CALAX) imposes its own no-contact apprehension program through automatic license plate recognition (ALPR) and its speed cameras.

== Suspensions ==
In June 2008, the Court of Appeals upheld a decision to declare the No Physical Contact Policy implemented by the MMDA in 2003 as void, upholding an earlier Makati court decision that deemed it "contrary to the constitutional right to due process".

On August 30, 2022, the Supreme Court issued a temporary restraining order ordering the suspension of the No Contact Apprehension Policy of the MMDA and the cities of Manila, Quezon City, Valenzuela, Parañaque, and Muntinlupa. The temporary restraining order also bars the LTO from providing motorist information to any other local governments implementing their own No Contact Apprehension Policy. While all five mentioned local governments and the MMDA have agreed to comply with the temporary restraining order, they have reiterated that the implementation of the NCAP has benefited their constituencies. Having not yet implemented their respective No Contact Apprehension policies, the local governments of San Juan City and Muntinlupa have also agreed to comply with the order.

Oral arguments for the petitions against the NCAP have been scheduled on January 23, 2023.

On August 30, 2024, the Office of the Solicitor-General appealed to the Supreme Court to lift the temporary restraining order of the NCAP in light of increasing traffic violations in Metro Manila, which had gone up from the average of 9,500 traffic violations to 32,000 every month. The Office had also requested that the constitutionality of NCAP be resolved immediately.

== Criticism ==
The most recent iteration of the No Contact Apprehension Policy has been criticized by private vehicle owners, as well as drivers and operators of public transport vehicles, for having to pay for fines for alleged traffic violations without their immediate knowledge. Some of these complaints were also in relation to those who had received violations on vehicles that they no longer owned or had transferred ownership of. As a result, the Land Transportation Office (LTO) has appealed to the local government units to temporarily suspend the NCAP for review.

On August 3, 2022, a transport group filed a petition for certiorari before the Supreme Court of the Philippines against the LTO and the cities of Manila, Quezon City, Valenzuela, Parañaque, and Muntinlupa. The petition seeks to challenge the NCAP, with the petitioners believing that the NCAP violates existing laws, has no basis defined in the MMDA Law and Land Transportation and Traffic Code, and violates "due process". On August 16, 2022, Quezon City 4th District representative Marvin Rillo filed House Resolution No. 237, calling the House Committee on Local Government, House Committee on Metro Manila Development, and House Committee on Transportation to investigate the implementation of the NCAP. This was followed by a privilege speech delivered by Surigao del Norte 2nd District representative Ace Barbers that questioned the constitutionality of the NCAP.

On August 17, 2022, a second petition was filed before the Supreme Court by a Manila-based lawyer, who challenged the implementation of the No Contact Apprehension Policy in the city of Manila. The petitioner claimed that he was fined ₱20,000 by the Manila Traffic and Parking Bureau (MTPB) for four traffic violations of obstructing pedestrian crossings from May to July 2021, but was not informed until he had been barred from registering his sport utility vehicle in Quezon City earlier in June 2022 due to the outstanding fines.

In his petition, the lawyer also alleges that the ordinance violates motorists' right to privacy, as anyone can look up traffic violations associated with a vehicle registration plate on the website of the Manila city government which shows the personal information of the vehicle owner. The lawyer also claims that the lack of transparency surrounding the monitoring system opens the possibility of it being "used by criminals who might poise as public officers" who may extort vehicle owners with NCAP violations.

In May 2025, the MMDA filed an urgent motion before the Supreme Court through the Office of the Solicitor General, seeking the lift the temporary restraining order on NCAP. The MMDA stated that the policy is necessary to better manage traffic flow and curb traffic violations during the upcoming major rehabilitation of EDSA. The Supreme Court granted their request on May 20, 2025, partially lifting the suspension of the MMDA NCAP.

=== Responses ===
In response to calls to suspend the NCAP, a joint statement was issued by Valenzuela mayor Wes Gatchalian, Parañaque mayor Eric Olivarez, Quezon City mayor Joy Belmonte, Manila mayor Honey Lacuna, and San Juan mayor Francis Zamora expressing their firm stand on the implementation of the No Contact Apprehension Program in their constituents.

Following the temporary restraining order, Quezon City mayor Joy Belmonte argues that the NCAP is "legal and proper", believing that "it instills a culture of traffic discipline among motorists". Belmonte also stated that traffic violations have significantly decreased by 93 percent in areas where the city had implemented the policy. This was supported by Manila Public Information Office spokesperson Princess Abante, who emphasized that the NCAP "eradicated" traffic extortion, improved the flow of traffic, and made its roads "safer" not only for vehicles, but also for pedestrians and cyclists in areas where it was implemented.

Abante also says that the implementation of the NCAP in Manila and other cities is backed by the excision of governing powers of local government units provided by Section 16 of the Local Government Code. She however, admits that based on the petitions filed before the Supreme Court, there are shortcomings on the implementation of the NCAP which should be carefully studied and addressed.

== See also ==
- Road signs in the Philippines
- Speed limits in the Philippines
- Traffic law in the Philippines
- Transportation in the Philippines
- Transportation in Metro Manila
- Traffic in Metro Manila
- Number coding in Metro Manila

Similar implementations in specific countries, states, or cities

- Road speed limit enforcement in Australia
- Automated Enforcement System (Malaysia)
- Traffic Electronic Control System (Turkey)
- Safety camera partnership and Road speed limit enforcement in the United Kingdom
- New York City speed camera program (United States)

Similar implementations in multiple countries

- Automatic number-plate recognition
- Red light camera
- Speed limit enforcement
- Traffic enforcement camera
