= Traffic law in the Philippines =

Rules of the road in the Philippines

The Land Transportation Office, which is responsible for the regulation and enforcement of land transportation rules and regulations.

Traffic law in the Philippines consists of multiple laws that govern the regulation and management of road transportation and the conduct of road users within the country.

The official and latest traffic code of the Philippines is Republic Act No. 4136, also known as the "Land Transportation and Traffic Code", which was enacted into law on June 20, 1964.

== Applicable laws ==
The following table lists all Philippine laws applicable to the governance of road transportation and road users across the Philippines or in specific major areas within the country.

List of national traffic laws
Designation	Date passed	Title	Status	Scope
Act No. 3045	March 10, 1922	Motor Vehicle Law	Repealed by RA 4136	Establishes a law regulating motor vehicle traffic and requiring the registration of motor vehicles and licensing of motor vehicle drivers.
Act No. 3992	December 3, 1932	Revised Motor Vehicle Law	Repealed by RA 4136	Revises provisions in Act No. 3045. Some of these changes include changes to definitions, penalties, and speed limits.
RA 2000	June 22, 1957	Limited Access Highway Act	In effect	Authorizes the construction of limited-access highways and defines traffic laws applicable to users of limited-access highways.
RA 4136	June 20, 1964	Land Transportation and Traffic Code	In effect	National traffic code. Covers the regulation and licensing of owners, dealers, conductors, drivers, and similar matters of motor vehicles, as well as the traffic laws that apply only to motor vehicles. This act is based on Act No. 3992 and repeals it.
PD 96	January 13, 1973	Presidential Decree No. 96	In effect	Prohibits and penalizes the usage of sirens, horns, or other similar gadgets with "exceptionally loud or startling sound" on motor vehicles and restricts such usage to authorized government vehicles.
RA 8750	August 5, 1999	Seat Belts Use Act of 1999	In effect	Mandates the inclusion of seat belts on private and public motor vehicles, excluding tricycles and motorcycles.
RA 10054	July 27, 2009	Motorcycle Helmet Act of 2009	In effect	Mandates the wearing of a standard motorcycle helmet for riders and backriders of motorcycles.
RA 10586	July 23, 2012	Anti-Drunk and Drugged Driving Act of 2013	In effect	Penalizes driving under the influence of alcohol, dangerous drugs, and other substances.
RA 10666	July 28, 2014	Children's Safety on Motorcycles Act of 2015	In effect	Regulates the backriding of children onboard on public roads with heavy and fast moving traffic.
RA 10913	July 27, 2015	Anti-Distracted Driving Act	In effect	Defines and penalizes distracted driving, particularly with electronics such as mobile phones.
RA 10916	July 27, 2015	Road Speed Limiter Act of 2016	In effect	Prohibits the registration and operation of any covered motor vehicle without a speed limiter device.
RA 11697	April 15, 2022	Electric Vehicle Industry Act (EVIDA)	In effect	Defines policies and responsibilities to create an enabling environment for the development of electric vehicles and micromobility.

List of department-level traffic issuances and orders
Designation	Date passed	Title	Status	Scope
DPWC AO No. 1 s. 1968	February 19, 1968	Revised Rules and Regulations Governing Limited Access Highways	Amended by DOTC DO NO. 2007-38	An administrative order issued by the Department of Public Works and Communications (now the Department of Public Works and Highways), by virtue of RA 2000, defining traffic rules and regulations governing limited-access highways.
LTO AO No. 2006-01	March 31, 2006	Guidelines in the Registration of Light Electric Vehicles (LEV)	Superseded by LTO AO No. 2021-039	Defines, classifies, and regulates the operation, registration, and related penalties of light electric vehicles, mainly electric motorcycles, scooters, and electric tricycles. Electric bicycles and "bicycle-like" vehicles are not covered by this order.
DOTC DO No. 2007-38	October 4, 2007	Rules and Regulations Governing the Use of Limited Access Facilities (Expressways) by Motorcycles	In effect	Amends provisions in DPWC AO 1 s. 1968 to allow motorcycles on limited access highways and defines rules and regulations specific to motorcycles on such highways.
LTO AHS 2008–015	May 15, 2008	Rules and Regulations for the Use and Operation of Motorcycles on Highways	In effect	Defines traffic rules and regulations for motorcycles on roads and highways.
JAO 2014–01	June 2, 2014	Revised Schedule of Fines and Penalties for Violations of Laws, Rules and Regulations Governing Land Transportation	In effect	Additional fines and penalties for the violation of land transportation traffic laws.
JMC 2018–01	January 17, 2018	Guidelines and Standards for the Classifications of Roads, Setting of Speed Limits Under Republic Act No. 4136, and Collection of Road Crash Data	In effect	Standardizes speed limits to be based on road classification and empowers local government units to collect road crash data and set local speed limits on local roads.
DOTr DO No. 2020-14	August 25, 2020	Guidelines and Protocols for Active Transportation and Light Mobility Vehicles	Superseded by DOTr DO No. 2024-013	Establishes and prescribes road safety protocols and penalties for motor vehicles, bicycles, and other non-motorized transport on the road.
LTO AO No. 2021-039	May 11, 2021	Consolidated Guidelines in the Classification, Registration and Operation of All Types of Electric Motor Vehicles	Partially suspended	Consolidates and updates the definition, classification, and regulations on electric motor vehicles, including electric cars, electric bicycles, and mobility scooters.
LTO AO No. VDM-2024-044	February 21, 2024	Amended Consolidated Guidelines in the Classification, Registration and Operation of All Types of Electric Vehicles	Partially suspended	Amends and revises sections of LTO AO No. 2021-039 for light electric vehicles.
DOTr DO No. 2024-013	September 23, 2024	Guidelines on the Use of Active Transport Infrastructure, Non-Motorized Vehicles (NMVs) and Light Electric Vehicles (LEVs)	In effect	Outlines updated guidelines on the proper use of active transportation infrastructure and integration with other modes of transport.

The following laws are only applicable to the Metro Manila area.

List of Metro Manila traffic laws
Designation	Date passed	Title	Status	Scope
Joint Metro Manila Traffic Circular No. 01	February 1, 2023	Metro Manila Traffic Code of 2023	In effect	Regional traffic code for Metro Manila covering unified traffic rules, regulations, ticketing, and penalties.

Since its enactment in 1964, there have been 12 amendments to RA 4136, the latest being in 2017.

List of amendments to RA 4136
Designation	Date passed	Title	Scope
RA 5715	June 21, 1969	An Act Amending Section Thirty-four of Republic Act Numbered Four Thousand One Hundred Thirty-six	Amends RA 4136 by allowing reflectors in place of lights when parked and requiring either of them for vehicle registration.
PD 382	January 28, 1974	Extending the Period for Registration of All for Hire Motor Vehicles, Amending for the Purpose Sub-paragraph 1, Paragraph (B), of Section 5, Republic Act Numbered 4136, as Amended	Amends RA 4136 by extending the period for vehicle registration.
PD 843	December 12, 1975	Amending Republic Act No. 4136, as Amended, Otherwise Known as the Land Transportation and Traffic Code by Increasing the Annual Registration Fee on Private Automobiles and Imposing an Ad Valorem Tax Thereon, and for Other Purposes	Amends RA 4136 by increasing registration fees and imposing excise tax.
PD 896	February 26, 1976	Further Amending Republic Act No. 4136, Otherwise Known as the Land Transportation and Traffic Code	Amends RA 4136 by updating the registration fees and schedule for registration.
PD 1057	November 30, 1976	Further Amending Republic Act No. 4136, Otherwise Known as the Land Transportation and Traffic Code	Amends RA 4136 by including vehicles owned by GOCCs for registration.
BP 74	June 11, 1980	An Act Amending Certain Sections Of Republic Act Numbered Forty-one Hundred and Thirty-six, Otherwise Known as the Land Transportation and Traffic Code	Amends the compulsory vehicle registration sections of RA 4136.
BP 398	May 18, 1983	An Act Amending Certain Sections of Republic Act Numbered Forty-one Hundred and Thirty-six, Otherwise Known as the Land Transportation and Traffic Code	Amends RA 4136 by requiring the possession of the driver's license and updating driver's licensing classifications.
PD 1934	June 11, 1984	Amending Certain Sections of Republic Act Numbered Forty One Hundred And Thirty Six Otherwise Known As The Land Transportation and Traffic Code	Amends RA 4136 by updating its annual vehicle registration fees and a road users' charge.
PD 1950	September 5, 1984	Amending Certain Sections of Presidential Decree No. 1934, Amending Republic Act No. 4136	Adjustments to the road users' charge in PD 1934, which amends RA 4136.
EO 43 s. 1986	August 22, 1986	Restructuring The Private Motor Vehicle Tax	Restructures the Motor Vehicle User's Charge.
RA 8794	June 27, 2000	An Act Imposing A Motor Vehicle User's Charge On Owners Of All Types Of Motor Vehicles And For Other Purposes	Further amends RA 4136 and nationalizes the implementation of the Motor Vehicle User's Charge implemented in BP 74 and EO 43 s. 1986.
RA 10930	July 25, 2017	An Act Rationalizing and Strengthening the Policy Regarding Driver's License by Extending the Validity Period of Drivers' Licenses, and Penalizing Acts in Violation of Its Issuance and Application Amending for Those Purposes Section 23 of Republic Act No. 4136, as Amended by Batas Pambansa Blg. 398 and Executive Order No. 1011, Otherwise Known as the Land Transportation and Traffic Code	Amends RA 4136 with updated clauses on the validity and registration of driver's licenses and related penalties.

== Definitions and coverage ==
=== Vehicles ===
Motor vehicles are defined by RA 4136 and the Metro Manila Traffic Code as any vehicle propelled by any power other than human power. Exceptions to this definition include vehicles on railway tracks, motor vehicles such as road rollers, trolley cars, street sweepers, sprinklers, lawn mowers, bulldozers, graders, forklifts, amphibian trucks, and cranes when not on public roads, as well as tractors, trailers, and vehicles with traction engines used exclusively for agriculture. In addition, trailers with any number of wheels propelled or intended to be propelled by a motor vehicle are classified as a separate motor vehicle.

Regulations for the use of bicycles and other non-motorized vehicles are defined by the DOTr in Department Order No. 2020-14.

==== Motor vehicle classifications ====
Motor vehicles in the Philippines are classified by the Land Transportation Office (LTO) according to vehicle category classifications established by the United Nations Economic Commission for Europe (UNECE). Vehicles are classified according to whether they are propelled by diesel, electric, or gasoline powered motor engines, as well as maximum design speed and vehicle weight. Electric motor vehicles are classified in a similar manner, but are subject to additional criteria based on power output, particularly for light electric vehicles (LEVs), which have added restrictions and exemptions.

Regulations on LEVs were first released in 2006, when the LTO issued Administrative Order No. 2006-01 and Memorandum Circular No. 721-2006. The order required that LEVs should be registered with the LTO as a separate category, observe a speed limit of 55 km/h (34 mph) and limited to the outermost lanes of provincial, city and municipal, and barangay roads, but may cross other roads.

In 2021, new consolidated guidelines on electric vehicles were released through LTO Administrative Order No. 2021-039. This order integrated purely electric-powered vehicles into the existing vehicle category classification system and introduced specific requirements for LEVs, delineating restrictions on allowed roads, registration and licensing requirements, and the requirement of motorcycle or bicycle helmet.

In 2024, LTO Administrative Order No. VDM-2024-044 revised these classification guidelines, allowing LEVs to operate on all public highways, excluding expressways, provided they are registered with the LTO and operated by appropriately licensed drivers. Certain classifications were also removed, and all two-wheeled vehicles were required to use motorcycle helmets.

As of October 2024, provisions concerning the licensing, registration, and restrictions of LEVs in both LTO Administrative Order No. 2021-039 and LTO Administrative Order No. VDM-2024-044 have been suspended following a directive from the Department of Transportation (DOTr) to review all LTO issuances that are inconsistent with the Electric Vehicle Industry Act (RA 11697).

Electric Scooter and Category L EV classifications (2021 – 2024, currently suspended)
Category	Specifications	Restrictions			
Category	Specifications	Road restrictions	Helmet requirement	Driver's license restrictions	Vehicle registration
Personal Mobility Scooter	Two, three, or four wheeled electric vehicle with or without pedals; Maximum design speed not exceeding 12.5 km/h (7.8 mph); Powered by up to 300 W	Limited to private roads, barangay roads, bicycle lanes, and walkways	Bicycle helmet	Not required	Not required
Electric Kick Scooter	—	Limited to private roads, barangay roads, and bicycle lanes	Motorcycle helmet	Not required	Not required
Category L1a e-Bike	Two-wheeled electric vehicle; Maximum design speed not exceeding 25 km/h (16 mph)	Limited to private roads, barangay roads, and bicycle lanes; May cross other roads; Not for public transport use	Bicycle helmet	Not required	Not required
Category L1b e-Bike	Two-wheeled electric vehicle; Maximum design speed not exceeding 50 km/h (31 mph)	Limited to private roads, barangay roads, and outermost lanes on local roads; May cross other roads; Not for public transport use	Motorcycle helmet	Not required	Not required
Category L2a Two-wheeled e-Moped	Three-wheeled electric vehicle; Maximum design speed not exceeding 25 km/h (16 mph)	Limited to private roads, barangay roads, and bicycle lanes; May cross other roads; Not for public transport use	Bicycle helmet	Not required	Not required
Category L2b Two-wheeled e-Moped	Three-wheeled electric vehicle; Maximum design speed not exceeding 50 km/h (31 mph)	Limited to private roads, barangay roads, and local roads on outermost lanes; May cross other roads; Not for public transport use	Motorcycle helmet	A restriction	Required
Category L3 Motorcycle	Two-wheeled electric vehicle; Maximum design speed exceeding 50 km/h (31 mph)	Allowed on all roads excluding limited-access highways (Note: Except for L3 units with a higher minimum power rating, to be determined by the Department of Transportation.)	Motorcycle helmet	A restriction	Required
Category L4 Asymmetric Three Wheeled Vehicle	Three-wheeled asymmetrical (with sidecar) electric vehicle; Maximum design speed not exceeding 50 km/h (31 mph); Electric variants with a maximum curb vehicle weight of 600 kilograms (1,300 lb) and powered by at least 1000 W	Limited to barangay, local, and tertiary roads; May cross other roads; May be authorized by LGUs to traverse national highways or main thoroughfares on outer lanes only	Not required	A1 restriction	Required
Category L5 Symmetric Three Wheeled Vehicle	Three-wheeled symmetrical electric vehicle; Maximum design speed not exceeding 50 km/h (31 mph); Electric variants with a maximum curb vehicle weight of 600 kilograms (1,300 lb) and powered by at least 1000 W	Limited to barangay, local, and tertiary roads; May cross other roads; May be authorized by LGUs to traverse national highways or main thoroughfares on outer lanes only	Not required	A1 restriction	Required
Category L6 Light Quadricycle	Four-wheeled electric vehicles with a maximum design speed of 45 km/h (28 mph); Gasoline and diesel variants with an unladen vehicle weight up to 350 kilograms (0.35 t); Electric variants with a maximum curb vehicle weight of 350 kilograms (770 lb) and powered by up to 4000 W	Limited to barangay, local, and tertiary roads; May cross other roads; May be authorized by LGUs to traverse national highways or main thoroughfares on outer lanes only	Not required	A1 restriction	Required
Category L7 Heavy Quadricycle	Four-wheeled electric vehicles with an unladen vehicle weight of 350 to 550 kilograms (0.35 to 0.55 t); Maximum design speed of 45 km/h (28 mph); Electric variants with a maximum curb vehicle weight of 350 to 550 kilograms (770 to 1,210 lb) and powered by up to 15000 W	Limited to barangay, local, and tertiary roads; May cross other roads; May be authorized by LGUs to traverse national highways or main thoroughfares on outer lanes only	Not required	A1 restriction	Required

Electric Scooter and Category L EV classifications (as of 2024, currently suspended)
Category	Specifications	Restrictions			
Category	Specifications	Road restrictions	Helmet requirement	Driver's license restrictions	Vehicle registration
Electric Mobility Scooter	Two, three, or four wheeled electric vehicle with or without pedals; Maximum design speed not exceeding 12.5 km/h (7.8 mph); Powered by less than 300 W	Allowed on all roads excluding limited-access highways	Motorcycle helmet	A restriction	Required
Category L1 Two-wheeled Moped	Two wheeled electric vehicle with or without pedals; Maximum design speed not exceeding 50 km/h (31 mph)	Allowed on all roads excluding limited-access highways	Motorcycle helmet	A restriction	Required
Category L2 Three-wheeled Moped	Three wheeled electric vehicle with or without pedals; Maximum design speed not exceeding 50 km/h (31 mph)	Allowed on all roads excluding limited-access highways	Not required	A restriction	Required
Category L3 Motorcycle	Two-wheeled electric vehicle; Maximum design speed exceeding 50 km/h (31 mph)	Allowed on all roads excluding limited-access highways	Motorcycle helmet	A restriction	Required
Category L4 Asymmetric Three Wheeled Vehicle	Three-wheeled asymmetrical (with sidecar) electric vehicle with a maximum curb vehicle weight of 600 kilograms (1,300 lb); Maximum design speed not exceeding 50 km/h (31 mph); Powered by least 1000 W	Allowed on all roads excluding limited-access highways	Not required	A1 restriction	Required
Category L5 Symmetric Three Wheeled Vehicle	Three-wheeled symmetrical electric vehicle with a maximum curb vehicle weight of 600 kilograms (1,300 lb); Maximum design speed not exceeding 50 km/h (31 mph); Powered by at least 1000 W	Allowed on all roads excluding limited-access highways	Not required	A1 restriction	Required
Category L6 Light Quadricycle	Four-wheeled electric vehicle with a maximum curb vehicle weight of 350 kilograms (770 lb); Maximum design speed not exceeding 45 km/h (28 mph); Powered by up to 4000 W	Allowed on all roads excluding limited-access highways	Not required	A1 restriction	Required
Category L7 Heavy Quadricycle	Four-wheeled electric vehicle with a maximum curb vehicle weight of 350 to 550 kilograms (770 to 1,210 lb); Maximum design speed of 45 km/h (28 mph); Powered by up to 15000 W	Allowed on all roads excluding limited-access highways	Not required	A1 restriction	Required

Category L classifications (non-EV)
Category	Specifications	Restrictions			
Category	Specifications	Road restrictions	Helmet requirement	Driver's license restrictions	Vehicle registration
Category L1 Two-wheeled Moped	Two wheeled diesel or gasoline vehicle with or without pedals; Maximum design speed not exceeding 50 km/h (31 mph)	Allowed on all roads excluding limited-access highways	Motorcycle helmet	A restriction	Required
Category L2 Three-wheeled Moped	Three wheeled diesel or gasoline vehicle with or without pedals; Maximum design speed not exceeding 50 km/h (31 mph)	Allowed on all roads excluding limited-access highways	Not required	A restriction	Required
Category L3 Motorcycle	Two-wheeled diesel or gasoline vehicle; Maximum design speed exceeding 50 km/h (31 mph)	Allowed on all roads excluding limited-access highways, with exceptions (Note: Except for two-wheeled motorcycles with an engine displacement above 400 cc (24 cu in) and three-wheeled motorcycles with engine displacement above 600 cc (37 cu in).)	Motorcycle helmet	A restriction	Required
Category L4 Asymmetric Three Wheeled Vehicle	Three-wheeled asymmetrical (with sidecar) diesel or gasoline vehicle with a maximum curb vehicle weight of 600 kilograms (1,300 lb); Maximum design speed not exceeding 50 km/h (31 mph)	Allowed on all roads excluding limited-access highways	Not required	A1 restriction	Required
Category L5 Symmetric Three Wheeled Vehicle	Three-wheeled symmetrical diesel or gasoline vehicle with a maximum curb vehicle weight of 600 kilograms (1,300 lb); Maximum design speed not exceeding 50 km/h (31 mph)	Allowed on all roads excluding limited-access highways	Not required	A1 restriction	Required
Category L6 Light Quadricycle	Four-wheeled diesel or gasoline vehicle with a maximum curb vehicle weight of 350 kilograms (770 lb); Maximum design speed not exceeding 45 km/h (28 mph)	Allowed on all roads excluding limited-access highways	Not required	A1 restriction	Required
Category L7 Heavy Quadricycle	Four-wheeled diesel or gasoline vehicle with a maximum curb vehicle weight of 350 to 550 kilograms (770 to 1,210 lb); Maximum design speed of 45 km/h (28 mph)	Allowed on all roads excluding limited-access highways	Not required	A1 restriction	Required

Category M and N classifications (EV and non-EV)
Category	Specifications	Restrictions		
Category	Specifications	Road restrictions	Driver's license restrictions	Vehicle registration
Category M1 Car, Van, and SUV	Electric, diesel, and gasoline vehicles with not more than 8 passenger seats; Gasoline and diesel variants with a gross vehicle weight up to 5,000 kilograms (5.0 t); Electric variants with a gross vehicle weight up to 3.5 metric tons (3,500 kg)	Allowed on all roads including limited-access highways	B restriction	Required
Category M2 Utility Vehicle and Jeepney	Electric, diesel, and gasoline vehicles with more than 8 passenger seats; Gasoline and diesel variants with a gross vehicle weight up to 5,000 kilograms (5.0 t); Electric variants with a gross vehicle weight of 3.500 to 5.000 kilograms (7.716 to 11.023 lb)	Allowed on all roads including limited-access highways	B1 restriction	Required
Category M3 Bus and e-Bus	Electric, diesel, and gasoline passenger vehicles with more than 8 seats; Gross vehicle weight exceeding 5,000 kilograms (5.0 t)	Allowed on all roads including limited-access highways	D restriction	Required
Category N1 Truck	Electric, diesel, and gasoline vehicles carrying goods with a gross vehicle weight up to 3,500 kilograms (3.5 t)	Allowed on all roads including limited-access highways	C restriction	Required
Category N2 Truck	Electric, diesel, and gasoline vehicles carrying goods with a gross vehicle weight of 3,500 to 12,000 kilograms (3.5 to 12.0 t)	Allowed on all roads including limited-access highways	C restriction	Required
Category N3 Truck	Electric, diesel, and gasoline vehicles carrying goods with a gross vehicle weight exceeding 12,000 kilograms (12 t)	Allowed on all roads including limited-access highways	C restriction	Required
Category O1 Articulated Car	Articulated gasoline and diesel vehicles with a gross vehicle weight up to 750 kilograms (0.75 t)	Allowed on all roads including limited-access highways	BE restriction	Required
Category O2 Articulated Car	Articulated gasoline and diesel vehicles with a gross vehicle weight of 750 to 3,500 kilograms (0.75 to 3.50 t)	Allowed on all roads including limited-access highways	BE restriction	Required
Category O3 Articulated Truck	Articulated gasoline and diesel vehicles with a gross vehicle weight exceeding 3,500 kilograms (3.5 t)	Allowed on all roads including limited-access highways	CE restriction	Required

=== Roads ===
All public roads and highways, defined as thoroughfares, boulevards, driveways, avenues, parks, and alleys are covered by RA 4136. This does not include corridors within private property or any institutions.

Republic Act No. 917 or the Philippine Highway Act of 1953 prohibits highways, bridges, or right-of-ways covered by RA 4136 from being obstructed, or from being usurped or converted to private use. The act also prohibits the removal or tampering of road infrastructure such as markers, signs, and other road-side facilities.

RA 4136 also applies to limited-access highways, more commonly known as expressways, alongside additional traffic laws and restrictions provided by Republic Act No. 2000 and DPWC Administrative Order No. 1 series of 1968.

In Metro Manila, the Metro Manila Traffic Code covers all roads and public places within the metro.

=== Parking ===
Under RA 4136 and the Metro Manila Traffic Code, a motor vehicle is considered to be parked when it has been stopped on the shoulder or edge of a highway for an "appreciable" period of time. A motor vehicle stopping to unload passengers or cargo is not considered to be parked if the vehicle moves away "without delay".

RA 4136 states that parking a vehicle – by leaving it attended or unattended for an "appreciable" period of time – is prohibited inside an intersection or within 6 m (20 ft) of it, in front of a private driveway, on a pedestrian crossing, within 4 m (13 ft) of a fire hydrant or a driveway of a fire station, and where "no parking" signs are placed.

Parking on any sidewalk, path, or alley not intended for vehicular traffic or parking (such as bicycle lanes) is also prohibited by RA 4136 and DOTr Department Order No. 2020-014.

== Standard rules ==
List of some standard rules of the road for motor vehicles and animal-drawn vehicles, all based on RA 4136:

- Keep to the right of the road except to pass others, where passing is allowed
- Vehicles must not exceed their registered carrying capacity
- Right of way at marked and unmarked intersections under various conditions
- Prohibited places for parking a vehicle
- Yield to police, fire department, and ambulance vehicles with a siren
- Yield right of way to pedestrian crossings
- Observe proper vehicle lighting and traffic light signalling
- Observe caution while driving and avoid impeding traffic
- Stopping if there has been a traffic collision

=== Speed limits ===
Speed limits for motor vehicles across the country are defined by RA 4136 based on the type of roads and their conditions. A higher maximum speed limit is generally applied to light motor vehicles while lower maximum speed limits are applied to heavier motor vehicles.

There are no minimum speed limits on public roads except on expressways. However, RA 4136 states that a driver of a motor vehicle must drive at a "careful and prudent speed, not greater nor less than is reasonable and proper" with regards to road conditions.

Pursuant to DILG-DPWH-DOTr Joint Memorandum Circular 2018–001, local government units may designate lower maximum speed limits on local roads in the interest of road safety.

=== Lane splitting and filtering ===
Lane splitting and lane filtering is not explicitly illegal on Philippine roads for any type of vehicle. However, lane sharing (which is incorrectly defined as "lane splitting") is considered illegal for motorcycles under LTO Administrative Order 2008-015, which states that a motorcycle or scooter must observe one lane per vehicle only. This policy however, is not actively enforced on the road.

Section 3 of DPWC AO No. 1 s. 1968 prohibits any vehicle from lane splitting, lane sharing, or lane filtering on all expressways in the Philippines. This also applies to motorcycles, as of DPWH Department Order No. 123 s. 2001.

=== Overtaking lanes and slow lanes ===
Expressways in the Philippines have a passing lane designated for overtaking and lanes designated for slow-moving vehicles. This however does not apply to public roads by default.

Section 3 of DPWC AO No. 1 s. 1968 states that slow-moving vehicles on expressways must use the right lane and use the left lane only when passing.

=== Liability in incidents ===
RA 4136 states that any accident resulting in death or injuries of another person due to negligence or reckless or unreasonable fast driving will be subject to provisions of the Revised Penal Code.

The traffic code also states that in the event of an accident, the driver must stop and show their drivers' license and the details of registration of the vehicle to the other parties involved. No driver of a motor vehicle involved in an accident should leave the scene without aiding any victims except if there is imminent danger of harm, if the incident is reported to law enforcement, or if medical services are called.

The Civil Code of the Philippines also dictates in the following articles that the liability of operating motor vehicles falls primarily on the owner or driver:

- Article 2184 states that in motor vehicle mishaps, the owner is solidarily liable with his driver, if the former, who was in the vehicle, could have, by the use of the due diligence, prevented the misfortune. It is disputably presumed that a driver was negligent, if he had been found guilty of reckless driving or violating traffic regulations at least twice within the next preceding two months. If the owner was not in the motor vehicle, the provisions of article 2180 are applicable.
- Article 2185 states that unless there is proof to the contrary, it is presumed that a person driving a motor vehicle has been negligent if at the time of the mishap, he was violating any traffic regulation.
- Article 2186 states that every owner of a motor vehicle shall file with the proper government office a bond executed by a government-controlled corporation or office, to answer for damages to third persons. The amount of the bond and other terms shall be fixed by the competent public official.

In 2004, the Supreme Court of the Philippines ruled in Añonuevo v. Court of Appeals that Article 2185 was not intended at the time of its creation in 1950 to also cover non-motorized vehicles on the road, affirming previous rulings that have affirmed the higher level of responsibility expected from motor vehicle drivers. The ruling also applies the principle of negligence per se, which states that to indict individuals for negligence in an incident, the violation of a statutory duty must directly cause the incident.

==== Detention of drivers involved in fatal incidents ====
Under the Revised Penal Code, Articles 124 and 125 provide the circumstances under which a person may be detained. Article 124 allows preventive detention in cases of mental incapacity or when necessary for the safety of the accused or others, while Article 125 allows police to temporarily detain the accused for investigation for 12 to 36 hours depending on the severity of the crime. If the accused is found to have caused harm through recklessness or negligence, they may be charged under Article 365, which penalizes acts of imprudence resulting in injury or death.

However, these provisions has been invoked in cases where drivers involved in fatal incidents were allegedly "unjustly arrested", even for brief periods, despite evidence suggesting they were engaged in defensive driving or were not at fault. In response to such cases, Senate Bill No. 2798 was filed in the 19th Congress, seeking to amend Article 124 and prohibit the detention of a driver if photo or video evidence shows that no traffic laws were violated before and during the incident.

==== Doctrine of last clear chance ====
The Supreme Court recognizes the doctrine of last clear chance, which holds that if both parties are negligent, but one had the final clear opportunity to avoid the harm and failed to do so, that party is held solely responsible for the resulting loss. This applies when the negligent act of one party occurs appreciably later than the other, or when it is unclear whose fault directly caused the injury.

In Lapanday Agricultural and Development Corp. v. Angala, the Court applied the doctrine against a speeding driver who failed to avoid a vehicle that was already slowing down to turn. Conversely, in Achevara v. Ramos, an incident involving a head-on collision between two vehicles, the doctrine was not applied because the driver of the oncoming vehicle had no real opportunity to avoid the collision as it was caused by the sudden mechanical failure of the other vehicle.

=== Pedestrian crossings ===
RA 4136 states that within commercial or residential areas, drivers of vehicles must yield the right of way to a pedestrians crossing public roads on pedestrian crossings, except when traffic movement is regulated by traffic enforcers. On the other hand, pedestrians must yield their right of way to motor vehicles when crossing a public road at any point other than a pedestrian crossing.

While the Philippines does not have a national anti-jaywalking law, local government units may have anti-jaywalking ordinances, such as MMA Ordinance No. 1 s. 1995 which supplements city and municipal anti-jaywalking ordinances in Metro Manila.

== Traffic restrictions ==
Outside of the traffic code, there are traffic restrictions which designate the time and day that certain vehicles or road users are allowed to operate on, as well as specific roads where these restrictions are enforced or exempted on.

=== Light electric vehicles ===
In Metro Manila, LEVs such as electric bicycles (e-bicycles), e-scooters, and electric rickshaws (e-tricycles) are required to use bicycle lanes when traversing major roads as designated by the Metropolitan Manila Development Authority in MMDA Regulation 24-002 and its implementing guidelines in MMDA Memorandum Circular No. 4 s. 2024.

RA 11697 provides that light electric vehicles may also use bicycle lanes. All light electric vehicles with a maximum design speed below 60 km/h (37 mph) are prohibited on roads designated as expressways.

=== Motorcycles ===
Motorcycles and mopeds are allowed on most roads with the exception of roads designated as expressways.

Only two-wheeled motorcycles with an engine displacement of 400 cc (24 cu in) and three-wheeled motorcycles with an engine displacement of 600 cc (37 cu in) are allowed to be used on expressways.

Some highways, particularly in Metro Manila, have motorcycle lanes where motorcycles are designated to use. However, these lanes are usually not exclusive to motorcycles and allow other road users to use them and require motorcycles to remain in the lane. One exception to this is the motorcycle lane along Commonwealth Avenue where vehicles other than motorcycles may be penalized for unnecessary usage of the motorcycle lane.

=== Non-motorized transport ===
Non-motorized vehicles include bicycles, kick scooters, and pedicabs, which are allowed on all public roads unless restricted otherwise.

All non-motorized transport are prohibited on roads designated as expressways.

Bicycle lanes are lanes along roads or separate paths designated for the exclusive or shared use of bicycles, non-motorized transport, and light electric vehicles. The generally applied rule is that only personal kick scooters, mobility scooters, bicycles, and pedal-assist bicycles are allowed to use bicycle lanes.

In Metro Manila, alongside LEVs, pedicabs and kuligligs are prohibited from traversing major roads and may only cross said roads as designated by the Metropolitan Manila Development Authority in MMDA Regulation 24-002 and its implementing guidelines in MMDA Memorandum Circular No. 4 s. 2024.

Some cities and municipalities have local traffic codes that require the registration of bicycles and mandate that bicycles are to be ridden only on bicycle lanes when present along a road, such as in San Juan and Mandaluyong. However, the bicycle-specific sections of the majority of these ordinances are not being actively enforced or may have been forgotten.

=== Public utility vehicles ===
Public transport vehicles, such as jeepneys, buses, and the UV Express are restricted to use designated lanes on certain roads. A notable example of this is the EDSA Busway, located on the inner lanes of EDSA in Metro Manila, which is restricted for the exclusive use of EDSA Carousel route buses and authorized government vehicles.

Similar to trucks, buses are to use the outermost lanes on the expressway. On the other hand, both public and private jeepneys are classified the same as cars and are allowed on all lanes.

Tricycles, pedicabs, and motorized tricycles used for public transport are prohibited from using national highways based on the Department of Interior and Local Government (DILG) Memorandum Circular No. 2020-036. This restriction does not apply to those being used for private use.

=== Trucks ===
Trucks are prohibited from passing through certain roads due to their large size and concern for safety around trucks. In Metro Manila, a truck ban ordinance prohibits trucks from most roads during the day and designates certain roads that are exempted from the truck ban.

Some highways such as Circumferential Road 5 have designated lanes that trucks must stay in at all times while traversing the road, usually designated on the third lane from the sidewalk. In addition to this, expressways have also designated the outermost lanes as lanes where trucks are only allowed to use.

== See also ==
- Driving license in the Philippines
- Road signs in the Philippines
- Speed limits in the Philippines
- Philippine expressway network#Laws and restrictions
- Turn on red#Philippines
- Vehicle registration plates of the Philippines
- No Contact Apprehension Policy
