= Margie =

Margie is a feminine given name, usually a short form (hypocorism) of the related names Margaret, Marjorie, or Margarita, all of which mean "pearl".

Margie may refer to:

== People ==
- Margie Abbott (born 1958), Australian businesswoman
- Margie Ackles (1939–2019), American retired figure skater
- Margie Adam, American musician and composer
- Marjorie Margie Alexander (1948–2013), American gospel and soul singer
- Margie Apa, New Zealand healthcare manager
- Margie Velma Barfield (1932–1984), American serial killer
- Margie Bowes (1941–2020), American country music singer
- Margie Bright Matthews (born 1963), American politician
- Margie Rasri Balenciaga Chirathiwat (born 1990), Thai actress and model
- Margie Cole, American bridge player
- Margie Cox, American singer
- Margie Day (1926–2014), stage name of Margaret Hoffler, American R&B singer
- Margaret Dingeldein (born 1980), American water polo player
- Margie Donlon, American politician and lawyer
- Margie Eugene-Richard, American environmentalist
- Margie Evans, American blues singer and songwriter born Marjorie Ann Johnson in 1940
- Margie Foote (1929–2012), American politician
- Margie Fuston, American writer
- Margie Gannon, American politician
- Margie Gillis (born 1953), Canadian dancer and choreographer
- Margie Goldstein-Engle (born 1958), American equestrian
- Margie Greenough Henson (1908–2004), American bull rider
- Margie Harrison, first Playboy Playmate of the Month (January and June 1954)
- Margaret Hart Ferraro (1913–2000), American burlesque strip tease artist better known as Margie Hart
- Margie Hendrix (1935–1973), an original member of Ray Charles' backing group, The Raelettes
- Margaret Margie Hines (1909–1985), American voice actress who played Olive Oyl in the Popeye cartoons from 1939 to 1944
- Margie Hohepa, New Zealand education academic
- Margarita Margie Holmes, Filipina psychologist and professor
- Marjorie Margie Hyams (1920–2012), American jazz vibraphonist, pianist and arranger
- Margaret Margie Joseph (born 1950), American R&B, soul and gospel singer
- Margie Kinsky (born 1958), Italian actress
- Margie E. Lachman, American psychologist
- Margie Lang (1924–2007), American baseball player
- Margie Liszt (1909–1992), American film and television actress
- Margie Mahoney (born 1952), American cross-country skier
- Margaret Martin (bodybuilder) (born 1979), American professional bodybuilder
- Margie Mason, American journalist
- Margaret Margie Masters (1934–2022), Australian LPGA golfer
- Margie Mixson (1927–2023), American educator
- Margarita Moran-Floirendo (born 1973), Filipina peace advocate, 1973 Miss Universe and President of Ballet Philippines
- Margie Morris (1892–1983), British-born Dutch performer
- Margie Neal (1875–1971), American journalist and politician
- Margie Newton, a stage name of Italian actress Margit Evelyn Newton (born 1961)
- Margie Nightingale, Australian politician
- Margie Orford (born 1964), South African journalist, film director and fiction and non-fiction author
- Margie Palatini, American author of children's books
- Margie Pedder (born 1980), English swimmer
- Margie Peden, South African public health researcher
- Margie Pitts Hames (1933–1994), American lawyer
- Margaret Margie Profet (born 1958), American evolutionary biologist
- Margie Rayburn, American singer born Marjorie Helen Orwig (1924–2000)
- Margie Reiger, silent movie actress, star of Charlie Chaplin's 1915 short By the Sea
- Margie Ruddick, American landscape architect
- Margie Santimaria (born 1989), Italian professional triathlete
- Margie Schnibbe (born 1963), American artist
- Margie Singleton, stage name of American country music singer and songwriter Margaret Louis Ebey (born 1935)
- Margie Smith (born 1969), American curler
- Margie Stewart (1919–2012), American actress and the official United States Army poster girl during World War II
- Margie Sudre (born 1943), French politician
- Margie Tsang (born 1964), Hong Kong actress and presenter
- Margie Wilcox, American politician elected to the Alabama House of Representatives in 2014
- Margie Winter (born 2002), Micronesian swimmer
- Marjorie Margie Wright (born 1952), American retired Hall-of-Fame college softball head coach and former pitcher

== Fictional characters ==
- Margie Albright, title character of My Little Margie, a 1950s American television situation comedy series
- Margie, titular character of Margie (1940 film), played by Nan Grey
- Margie Clayton, title character of Margie (TV series), a 1960s situation comedy starring Cynthia Pepper
- Marjorie "Margie" MacDuff, protagonist of Margie (1946 film), played by Jeanne Crain
- Margie Star, the wife of Herb Star and the mother of Sam and Patrick in the animated TV series SpongeBob SquarePants
- Margie, an elephant villager from the video game series Animal Crossing
- Lt. Margie Cutler, recurring character in the first season of the TV series M*A*S*H

== See also ==
- Margy
- Marji
