= Josh Mojica =

Filipino entrepreneur and content creator (born 2004)

- Born: July 5, 2004 (age 22); Cavite, Philippines
- Occupations: Entrepreneur; content creator
- Years active: 2021–present
- Known for: Founder of Kangkong Chips Original

Josh "Jhelo" Mojica (born July 5, 2004) is a Filipino entrepreneur and content creator known for founding Kangkong Chips Original (KCO).

== Early life and education ==
Mojica was born and raised in Cavite, Philippines. He attended Saint Augustine School-Mendez during his early education. He began his business venture in June 2023, inspired by his aunt's recipe for kangkong chips and motivated by his grandfather's advice. Mojica's business journey started as a way to help support his family.

== Career ==
Mojica's business, Kangkong Chips Original, began as a small-scale operation with an initial capital of ₱3,000. With the help of friends, he manually produced and sold kangkong chips, starting with sales to friends and family. Within six months, he was earning over ₱100,000 monthly, and by the following year, he had reached his first million in earnings.

In 2022, Mojica had established a two-story factory and expanded his workforce to 100 employees, offering six flavors of kangkong chips to both local and international customers. His strategic use of social media platforms played a significant role in expanding his customer base and boosting sales.

Mojica's entrepreneurial journey began with an initial capital investment inspired by his grandfather. He gained attention for supplying kangkong chips for holiday gift baskets, supported by public figures like Ping Lacson. By age 18, Mojica achieved millionaire status through significant business expansion, demonstrating determination to support his family.

Mojica also gained significant attention after appearing on Franklin Miano's podcast, where he discussed his views on the Philippine education system. His comments sparked a debate on the value of formal education versus practical experience. Mojica later clarified that he did not intend to discourage formal education but wanted to highlight his personal success story through self-acquired knowledge.

== Legal issues ==
On July 5, 2025, the Land Transportation Office suspended Mojica’s license after he posted a video of himself using a phone while driving a Porsche. He faces charges of reckless driving, violation of the Anti-Distracted Driving Act, and being an improper person to operate a motor vehicle. Mojica denied the allegation in a Facebook post, stating, "Hindi ako 'yan promise, edit lang yan!!!" (Note: lit. 'That’s not me, I promise!!!') On July 7, Mojica later apologized, saying, "No excuses. That was my mistake. I take full responsibility."
