= Marjie =

Marjie is a feminine given name. Notable people with the name include:

- Marjie Lawrence (1932–2010), English actress
- Marjie Lundstrom (born 1956), American journalist
- Marjie Millar (1931–1966), American actress

== See also ==
- Marie (given name)
- Marji
