= United Nations Road Safety Fund =

UN global multi-partner trust fund

The United Nations Road Safety Fund (UNRSF) is a United Nations global multi-partner trust fund dedicated to supporting the United Nations Sustainable Development Goal 3.6, aiming to halve the number of road traffic deaths and injuries by 2030, by financing global road safety projects in low- and middle- income countries (LMICs).

== Mission ==
The UNRSF aims to finance high-impact global road safety projects in LMICs using well-researched and internationally recognized best practices to minimize road trauma and improve safety for all road users.

== Platforms of Engagement ==
In support of the UN Sustainable Development Goals (SDGs), each of the six platforms corresponding to a respective SGD. These include the Platform on Health and Road Safety (SDG 3), the Platform on Education and Road Safety (SDG 4), as well as Platforms on Gender Equality (SDG 5), Economic Growth (SDG 8), Low-Carbon Sustainable Cities (SDGs 11, 13), Partnerships & Data (SGD 17). Road safety experts from academia and industry are recruited to serve as advisors to inform funding allocation and identify high-impact global road safety projects.

== History ==
The UNRSF was launched on April 12, 2018, at UNHQ New York. The FIA Foundation pledged US$10 million to the United Nations to support the creation of the "UN Safety Trust Fund."

=== Achievements ===
==== Legislation ====
Funding supported legislation in Azerbaijan to improve post-crash response to road traffic incidents.

==== Law enforcement ====
Enforcement is a key element of road safety by ensuring legislation is implemented. Funding from the UNRSF supported increased speed limit enforcement in Brazil and Jordan.

==== Road traffic injury surveillance ====
With the importance of surveillance is toward establishing baselines for improvement, the UNRSF has funded improvements to data collection in Senegal and the Ivory Coast.

==== Urban planning ====
In Kenya, the UNRSF has supported road safety elements for vulnerable road users like pedestrians and cyclists. Funding for urban planner training in Paraguay has increased the safety of school zones.

== Personnel ==
=== SDG-3: Health and Road Safety ===
==== Facilitators ====
- Analia Lourdes Pastran (Head of International Relations, National Road Safety Agency of Argentina)
- Benjamin W. Wachira (President of AFEM and Head of the Accident and Emergency Department of the Aga Khan University Hospital, Nairobi, The African Federation for Emergency Medicine (AFEM))
- Nhan Tran (Head, Safety and Mobility, Department of the Social Determinants of Health, World Health Organization)

==== Advisors ====
- Alex Ayub (National Youth Coordinator, Kenya Red Cross Society)
- Abdulgafoor M. Bachani (Director of the Johns Hopkins International Injury Research Unit and Associate Professor in International Health, Johns Hopkins School of Public Health)
- Peter G. Delaney (Founder, Lay First Responders International)
- Mohamed Eissa (Liaison Officer for Public Health Issues, International Federation of Medical Students Association)
- Peter Kronberg (Director Governmental Affairs, Autoliv)
- Halyna Ostrovska (Ukrainian Road Safety Association, Head of Public Organization “Social Rehabilitation", Managing Partner of the Rehabilitation Center "AMR Active Medical Rehabilitation" and Orest Shelepinskyi, Head of the Committee on Traffic Accidents at Lviv Region, Head of Public Organization "OSA”)
- Boboye Oyeyemi (Corps Marshall, Federal Road Safety Corps of Nigeria)
- Margie Peden (Senior Research Fellow of Head Injury, George Institute UK)
- Donna Price (Founder and Chairperson, International Road Victims’ Partnership)

=== SDG-4: Education and Road Safety ===
==== Facilitators ====
- Joanne Adrienne Vincenten (Health Specialist - Injury Prevention & Environmental Health, UNICEF)
- Nora Guitet (Public Affairs & Corporate Communication Director, Michelin)
- Nancy McLennan (Sport-Education Lead in the Social and Human Sciences Sector, UNESCO)

==== Advisors ====
- Zulikifili Baba Noor (Shell Malaysia, Country Social Performance and Social Investment Advisor)
- Maria-Giuseppina Bruna (CST & Social Research, IPAG Business School Group, Full Professor in Management and Dean of Ethics)
- Marc Fancy (Prudence Foundation, Executive Director)
- Susana de la Antonio (Safe Mobility Specialist, Fundación Mapfre, Director)
- Avi Silverman (FIA Foundation, Deputy Director)
- Jeffrey Witte (Amend, Executive Director)

=== SDG-5: Gender Equality and Road Safety ===
==== Facilitators ====
- Douglas Webb (Team Leader, Health, Gender and Environment, UNDP)
- Nargis Azizova (Programme Specialist, UN Women)
- Kalpana Viswanath (Chief Executive Officer, Safetipin)

==== Advisors ====
- Anoush der Boghossian (Economic Affairs Officer, Trade and Development Division, WTO)
- Maria-Giuseppina Bruna (Full Professor in Management and Dean for Ethics, CSR & Social Research, IPAG Business School Group, IPAG Business School)
- Naomi Mwaura (Founding Director, Flone Initiative)
- Analia Lourdes Pastran (Head of International Relations, National Road Safety Agency of Argentina)
- Bremer Pernilla (Utredare/Senior Administrative Officer, Swedish Transport Agency)

=== SDG-8: Economic Growth and Road Safety ===
==== Facilitators ====
- Virpi Stucki (Chief - Rural Entrepreneurship, Job Creation and Human Security Division, UNIDO)

==== Advisors ====
- Anoush der Boghossian (Economic Affairs Officer, Trade and Development Division, WTO)
- Saskia Marx (Business Development Adviser, International Trade Center (ITC))
- Galeboe Motlhajoe (Vice Coordinator, Society of Road Safety Ambassadors (SORSA))
- Johan Reiman (Director Social Responsibility, Volvo Group)
- Serafima Rusinovich (Co-Founder, Roussin)
- Sofia Rusinovich (Co-Founder, Roussin)
- Robert Trottein (President, Laser International Foundation)
