= Speed limits in the Philippines =

A speed limit sign used in the Philippines

Speed limits in the Philippines are specified in Republic Act No. 4136, or the Land Transportation and Traffic Code of the Philippines, which took effect on its approval on June 20, 1964. The act covers a number of areas other areas than speed limits, and was amended regarding some of those areas by Republic Act No. 10930, which was approved on August 2, 2017.

As of 2024, RA 4136 is listed as current by the Land Transportation Office. Speed limits covered in the act apply to motor vehicles when mainly traversing national roads, but lower speed limits may be specified on provincial and local roads in the interest of road safety and design speed, but not exceeding that of RA 4136. Roads within private property are not subject to the speed limits of RA 4136.

Nonwithstanding the above, the generally applied maximum speed limits are 20 to 30 km/h (12 to 19 mph) on most city or municipal roads, 40 to 80 km/h (25 to 50 mph) on most highways, and 100 km/h (62 mph) on most expressways.

The speed limit sign is a red circle with numbers inside as in most countries including Japan, Thailand and Malaysia.

== Historic speed limits ==
=== Act No. 2159 ===
Speed restrictions for motor vehicles were first defined under the Insular Government of the Philippine Islands in Act No. 2159, the first formal law on land transportation, which was passed by the 3rd Philippine Legislature on February 5, 1912. Under this act, it was prohibited for a motor vehicle to be operated "recklessly" or at a speed that may inflict damage to property or the safety or rights of people relative to current road conditions.

SEC. 24. No person shall operate a motor vehicle on any highway in these Islands recklessly or at a rate of speed greater than is reasonable and proper, having regard to the width, traffic, grades, crossings, curvatures, and other conditions of the highway and to the conditions of the atmosphere and weather, or so as to endanger the property or the safety or rights of any person or so as to cause excessive or unreasonable damage to the highway.

=== Act No. 2389 ===
On February 27, 1914, Act No. 2389 was passed into law, providing amendments to Act No. 2159. These amendments added maximum speed limits for all motor vehicles in certain road conditions and areas, specifically when traversing town roads, at blind corners, and intersections.

Under the amendments in Act No. 2389, a driver will be considered as driving at a "speed greater than is reasonable and proper" for:

- Crossing a street railway at a speed greater than 10 mph (16 km/h)
- Driving within a city or poblacion at a speed greater than 20 mph (32 km/h)
- Driving faster than 15 mph (24 km/h) when visibility is obscured at curves, intersections, or meeting other vehicles or conveyances
- Driving faster than 10 mph (16 km/h) when a tram car is stationary or about to stop on the side of the driver of the motor vehicle

=== Act No. 2587 ===
On February 3, 1916, Act No. 2587 added more amendments to Act No. 2159, adding maximum speed limits for motor vehicles based on the gross vehicle weight and the material of the tires used.

Maximum allowable speeds according to Act No. 2587
Gross vehicle weight	Rubber tires	Metal tires
Gross vehicle weight of 3.5 to 5 t (7,700 to 11,000 lb)	20 km/h (12 mph)	12 km/h (7.5 mph)
Gross vehicle weight of 5 to 8 t (11,000 to 18,000 lb)	15 km/h (9.5 mph)	10 km/h (6 mph)

=== Act No. 3045 ===
On March 9, 1922, Act No. 3045 added maximum speed limits for motor vehicles with pneumatic tires and increased the speed limits provided in previous acts.

Maximum allowable speeds according to Act No. 3045
Gross vehicle weight	Pneumatic tires	Solid rubber tires	Metal tires
Passenger automobiles of any weight and trucks not exceeding 2,300 kg (5,100 lb)	Reasonable speed	20 km/h (12.5 mph)	12 km/h (7.5 mph)
Gross vehicle weight of 2,301 to 5,000 kg (5,073 to 11,023 lb)	25 km/h (16 mph)	18 km/h (11 mph)	12 km/h (7.5 mph)
Gross vehicle weight of 5,001 to 8,000 kg (11,025 to 17,637 lb)	20 km/h (12.5 mph)	15 km/h (9 mph)	10 km/h (6 mph)

Under the amendments in Act No. 3045, a driver will be considered as driving at a "speed greater than is reasonable and proper" for:

- Crossing a street railway at a speed greater than 15 km/h (9 mph)
- Driving within a city or poblacion at a speed greater than 30 km/h (19 mph)
- Driving faster than 25 km/h (16 mph) when visibility is obscured at curves, intersections, or meeting other vehicles or conveyances
- Driving faster than 15 km/h (9 mph) when a tram car is stationary or about to stop on the side of the driver of the motor vehicle

=== Act No. 3992 ===
On December 2, 1932, Act No. 3992 changed maximum speed limits to be based on road conditions and the type of motor vehicle and adds exemptions for emergency vehicles and certain government vehicles. These speed limits would serve as the basis for the current speed limits in RA 4136, which repeals this act.

Maximum allowable speeds according to Act No. 3992
Roadway type	Passenger cars and motorcycles	Motor trucks and buses
Open country roads, with no “blind corners” not closely bordered by habitations	70 km/h (43 mph)	50 km/h (31 mph)
On “through streets” or boulevards, clear of traffic, with no ” blind corners,” when so designated	40 km/h (25 mph)	30 km/h (19 mph)
On city and municipal streets, with light traffic, when not designated “through streets”	30 km/h (19 mph)	
Through crowded streets, approaching intersections at “blind corners,” passing school zones, passing other vehicles which are stationary, or for similar dangerous circumstances	20 km/h (12 mph)	
The provisions of Section 46 (c), 53, and 56 of this Act, shall not be applicable to: Ambulances, police patrol-wagons, fire wagons and engines; Automobiles or motorcycles especially designated and assigned by the Director of Public Works, the Chief of Constabulary, and the Chief of Police of the City of Manila for the purpose of, and while being used for the enforcement of this Act.; This exemption is not, however, to be construed to authorize or condone uselessly or unnecessarily reckless or fast operation of any of the motor vehicles mentioned in this section, nor to exempt from liability under this Act, any operator of such motor vehicle for useless or unnecessarily fast or reckless operation.

The act also prohibits the failure of an automobile or motorcycle operator to come to a full stop within 20 meters (66 ft) but not less than 2.5 meters (8.2 ft) from a road intersection or railroad crossing. The exception to this is if no hazard exists, a driver is allowed to pass at a maximum speed of 10 km/h (6 mph).

== Current speed limits ==
The current speed limits for motor vehicles are provided by Republic Act No. 4136, passed by the 5th Congress of the Philippines on June 20, 1964, which consolidates and repeals all previous acts into a unified traffic code.

RA 4136 states that any person driving a motor vehicle on a highway shall:

- Drive at a "careful and prudent speed" not greater nor less than is "reasonable and proper" with due regard for the traffic, the width of the highway, and of any other existing and prior conditions
- No person shall drive any motor vehicle at such a speed as to endanger the life, limb and property of any person, nor at a speed greater than will permit him to bring the vehicle to a stop within an assured clear distance ahead.

Based on the above provisions, RA 4136 defines maximum allowed speed limits, which apply to all motor vehicles on public highways, including cars, motorcycles, jeepneys, and trucks.

All public thoroughfares, boulevards, driveways, avenues, parks, and alleys are defined as "public highways" under this act. As such, speed limits do not apply to corridors within private property.

RA 4136 also states that the driver of any vehicle traveling at an unlawful speed shall forfeit any right of way which he might otherwise have enjoyed under the same law.

Maximum allowable speeds according to RA 4136
Roadway type	Passenger cars and motorcycles	Motor trucks and buses
Open country roads, with no “blind corners” not closely bordered by habitations	80 km/h (50 mph)	50 km/h (31 mph)
On “through streets” or boulevards, clear of traffic, with no ” blind corners,” when so designated	40 km/h (25 mph)	30 km/h (19 mph)
On city and municipal streets, with light traffic, when not designated “through streets”	30 km/h (19 mph)	
Through crowded streets, approaching intersections at “blind corners,” passing school zones, passing other vehicles which are stationary, or for similar dangerous circumstances	20 km/h (12 mph)	
The rates of speed hereinabove prescribed shall not apply to the following: 1. A physician or his driver when the former responds to emergency calls; 2. The driver of a hospital ambulance on the way to and from the place of accident or other emergency; 3. Any driver bringing a wounded or sick person for emergency treatment to a hospital, clinic, or any other similar place; 4. The driver of a motor vehicle belonging to the Armed Forces while in use for official purposes in times of riot, insurrection or invasion; 5. The driver of a vehicle, when he or his passengers are in pursuit of a criminal; 6. A law-enforcement officer who is trying to overtake a violator of traffic laws; and 7. The driver officially operating a motor vehicle of any fire department, provided that exemption shall not be construed to allow unless or unnecessary fast driving of drivers afore-mentioned.

=== Local speed limits ===
RA 4136 states that no provincial, city, or municipal authority is allowed to enact or enforce any ordinance or resolution that changes the maximum allowed speed limits in the act. However, this is superseded by the DOTr-DPWH-DILG Joint Memorandum Circular 2018-001, which encourages all Local Government Units (LGUs) to enact and enforce local speed limit ordinances and to define speed limits according to local conditions.

On national roads, speed limits must follow the recommended design speed of the road topography based on DPWH guidelines and standards.

Recommended design speeds under DPWH guidelines
Topography	National Primary Roads	National Secondary Roads
Flat	80 km/h (50 mph)	70 km/h (43 mph)
Rolling	60 km/h (37 mph)	
Mountainous	50 km/h (31 mph)	40 km/h (25 mph)

Speed limits on National Roads
Road classification	Passenger cars and motorcycles	Motor trucks and buses
Open roads	80 km/h (50 mph)	50 km/h (31 mph)
Through streets	40 km/h (25 mph)	30 km/h (19 mph)
Crowded streets	20 km/h (12 mph)	

On provincial and local roads, LGUs may designate their own speed limits subject to the approval of the DOTr. In the interest of road safety, these speed limits may be lower than that in RA 4136 provided that they do not exceed the per road classification maximum speed limits of RA 4136.

Speed limits on Provincial and Local Roads
Road classification	Passenger cars and motorcycles	Motor trucks and buses
Open roads	40 km/h (25 mph)	30 km/h (19 mph)
Through streets	40 km/h (25 mph)	30 km/h (19 mph)
Municipal or city streets	30 km/h (19 mph)	
Barangay roads	20 km/h (12 mph)	
Crowded streets and collector roads	20 km/h (12 mph)	

=== Expressways ===
Speed limits on all limited-access highways or expressways in the Philippines are defined by Department of Public Works and Communications (DPWC) Administrative Order No. 1 signed on February 19, 1968. The order states that vehicles on expressways must be driven at a minimum speed limit of 60 km/h (37 mph) and a maximum speed limit of 100 km/h (62 mph). However, this may vary between different expressways all around the country.

The order also prohibits any vehicle or equipment that is incapable of traveling on expressways at the minimum speed limit from driving on the expressway.

As of 2025, the minimum and maximum speed limits on expressways are as follows:

Minimum and maximum speed limits on expressways
Expressway and segments		Minimum speed	Maximum speed limits		
Expressway and segments		Minimum speed	Sub-400cc motorcycles	Buses and trucks	400cc motorcycles and cars
C-5 Southlink Expressway		60 km/h (37 mph)	Not allowed	60 km/h (37 mph)	
Cavite–Laguna Expressway		60 km/h (37 mph)	Not allowed	80 km/h (50 mph)	
Cebu–Cordova Link Expressway	Main bridge	—N/a	60 km/h (37 mph)		
Cebu–Cordova Link Expressway	Causeway	—N/a	40 km/h (25 mph)		
Manila–Cavite Expressway		60 km/h (37 mph)	Not allowed	80 km/h (50 mph)	100 km/h (62 mph)
Metro Manila Skyway		60 km/h (37 mph)	Not allowed	60 to 80 km/h (37 to 50 mph) (Note: Effective January 15, 2025 for the NAIA Expressway and effective January 20, 2025 for the Skyway Stage 3. Straight sections will follow an 80 km/h (50 mph) speed limit while curved sections remain at 60 km/h (37 mph).)	
Muntinlupa–Cavite Expressway		60 km/h (37 mph)	Not allowed	80 km/h (50 mph)	100 km/h (62 mph)
NAIA Expressway		60 km/h (37 mph)	Not allowed	60 to 80 km/h (37 to 50 mph)	
NLEX Connector		60 km/h (37 mph)	Not allowed	60 km/h (37 mph)	80 km/h (50 mph)
NLEX Harbor Link		60 km/h (37 mph)	Not allowed	80 km/h (50 mph)	100 km/h (62 mph)
North Luzon Expressway		60 km/h (37 mph)	Not allowed	80 km/h (50 mph)	100 km/h (62 mph)
South Luzon Expressway		60 km/h (37 mph)	Not allowed	80 km/h (50 mph)	100 km/h (62 mph)
Southern Tagalog Arterial Road		60 km/h (37 mph)	Not allowed	80 km/h (50 mph)	100 km/h (62 mph)
Subic–Clark–Tarlac Expressway		60 km/h (37 mph)	Not allowed	100 km/h (62 mph)	
Tarlac–Pangasinan–La Union Expressway		60 km/h (37 mph)	Not allowed	100 km/h (62 mph)	

On May 18, 2023, Ilocos Sur 1st district representative Ronald Singson filed House Bill No. 4089, which proposes to increase the maximum speed limit on expressways from 100 km/h (62 mph) to 140 km/h (87 mph). Under the proposal, buses and other large vehicles would have a speed limit of 120 km/h (75 mph) while other vehicles would have a speed limit of 140 km/h (87 mph).

=== Major roads in Metro Manila ===
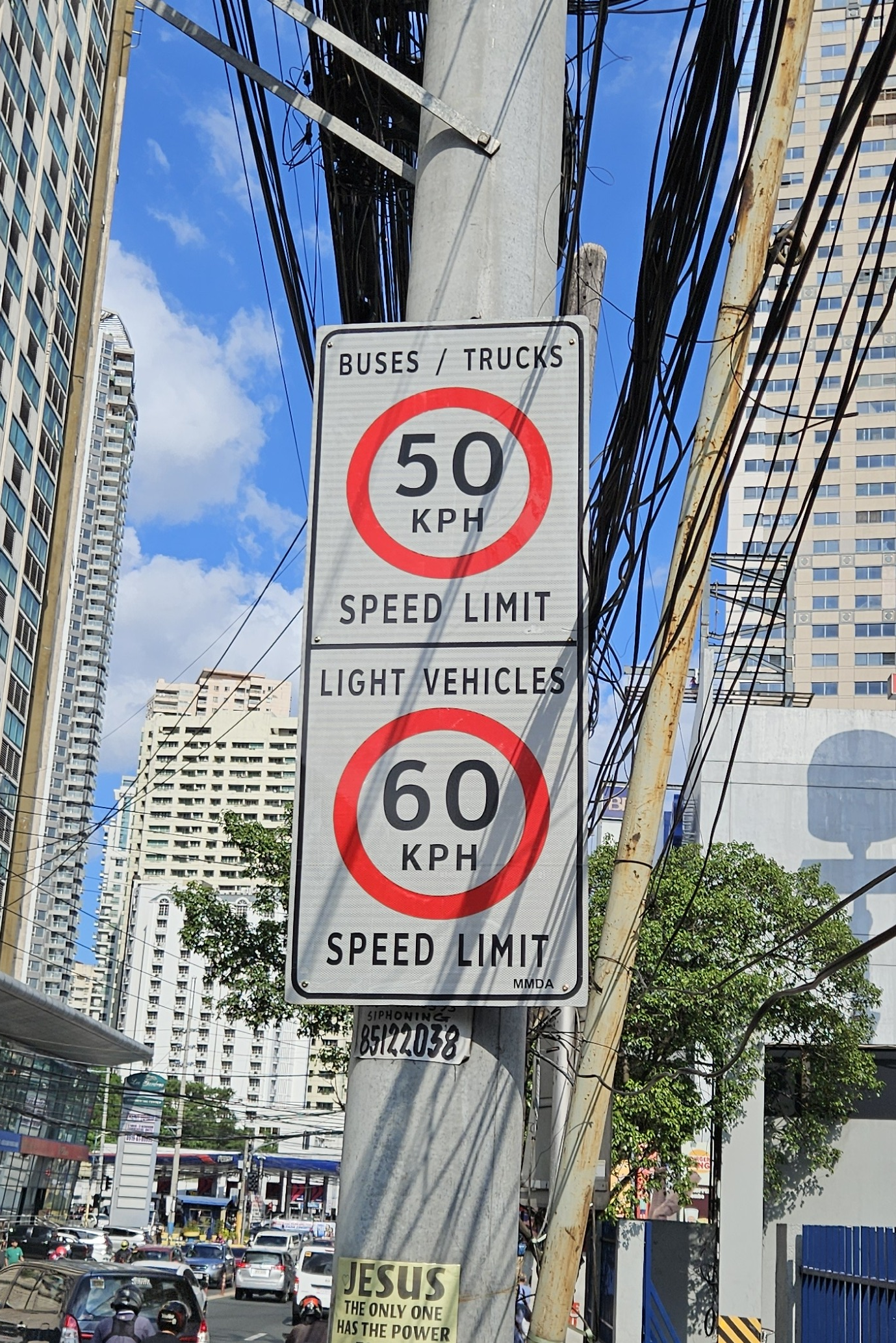
MMDA speed limit sign along Shaw Boulevard in Mandaluyong.

In Metro Manila, the Metropolitan Manila Development Authority (MMDA) defines a 50 to 60 km/h (31 to 37 mph) maximum speed limit on specific radial and circumferential roads that it has jurisdiction over, including Commonwealth Avenue and Macapagal Boulevard.

Speed limits of major roads in Metro Manila
Route	Coverage	Type of vehicle	
Route	Coverage	Cars and motorcycles	Trucks and buses
Radial roads
R-1	Roxas Boulevard (Recto Avenue to NAIA Road)	60 km/h (37 mph)	50 km/h (31 mph)
R-2	Taft Avenue (Lawton to Redemptorist Road)	60 km/h (37 mph)	50 km/h (31 mph)
R-3	Osmeña Highway (Quirino Avenue to Sales Interchange)	60 km/h (37 mph)	50 km/h (31 mph)
R-4	Shaw Boulevard, Victorino Mapa Street, and Paula Sanchez Street (Magsaysay Boulevard to Pasig Boulevard)	60 km/h (37 mph)	50 km/h (31 mph)
R-5	Ortigas Avenue (Bonny Serrano Avenue to Pasig-Cainta border)	60 km/h (37 mph)	50 km/h (31 mph)
R-6	Aurora Boulevard and Magsaysay Boulevard (Legarda Street to Katipunan Avenue)	60 km/h (37 mph)	50 km/h (31 mph)
R-7	España Boulevard, Quezon Avenue, and Commonwealth Avenue (Carlos Palangca to Mindanao Avenue)	60 km/h (37 mph)	50 km/h (31 mph)
R-8	Andres Bonifacio Avenue (Blumentritt Road to Balintawak Interchange)	60 km/h (37 mph)	50 km/h (31 mph)
R-9	Rizal Avenue (Carriedo Street to Bonifacio Monument)	60 km/h (37 mph)	50 km/h (31 mph)
R-10	Radial Road 10 (Recto Avenue to Circumferential Road 4)	60 km/h (37 mph)	50 km/h (31 mph)
Circumferential roads
C-1	Recto Avenue (Roxas Boulevard to Legarda Street)	60 km/h (37 mph)	50 km/h (31 mph)
C-2	Lacson Avenue and Quirino Avenue (Roxas Boulevard to Radial Road 10)	60 km/h (37 mph)	50 km/h (31 mph)
C-3	Gregorio Araneta Avenue and Sergeant Rivera Avenue (N. Domingo Street to Radial Road 10)	60 km/h (37 mph)	50 km/h (31 mph)
C-4	Circumferential Road 4 (Radial Road 10 to Macapagal Boulevard)	60 km/h (37 mph)	50 km/h (31 mph)
C-5	Circumferential Road 5 (Commonwealth Avenue to Mindanao Avenue)	60 km/h (37 mph)	50 km/h (31 mph)
C-6	Laguna Lake Highway	60 km/h (37 mph)	50 km/h (31 mph)
Other roads
	Macapagal Boulevard	60 km/h (37 mph)	50 km/h (31 mph)

== Enforcement ==
Enforcement of speed limits are low in the Philippines due to lack of awareness of the mandate set by RA 4136. To address this concern, DOTr, DPWH and DILG issued a joint memorandum on January 17, 2018 addressed to LGUs regarding the implementation of RA 4136 and encouraging LGUs to adopt lower speed limits in a bid to reduce road crash fatalities and injuries nationwide. LGUs are enjoined to adopt guidelines on road classification, setting and enforcement of speed limits according to local settings, and the collection and analysis of road crash data. The United Nations Road Safety Fund has conducted training-of-trainers for law enforcement personnel who can then in turn train others in practical speed enforcement training.
