= Anti-Distracted Driving Act =

Philippine law

Congress of the Philippines
- Long title: An Act Defining and Penalizing Distracted Driving
- Citation: Republic Act No. 10913
- Territorial extent: Philippines
- Enacted by: Senate of the Philippines
- Enacted: February 3, 2016
- Enacted by: House of Representatives of the Philippines
- Enacted: June 6, 2016
- Signed by: lapsed into law
- Signed: July 21, 2016
- Commenced: May 18, 2017

Legislative history

Initiating chamber: Senate of the Philippines
- Bill title: An Act Defining and Penalizing Distracted Driving
- Bill citation: Senate Bill 3211
- Introduced by: Bong Revilla, Jinggoy Estrada and Sergio Osmeña III
- Introduced: February 3, 2016

Revising chamber: House of Representatives of the Philippines
- Bill title: An Act Defining and Penalizing Distracted Driving
- Bill citation: House Bill 4531
- Received from the Senate of the Philippines: June 6, 2016
- Member(s) in charge: Romeo Acop (Antipolo), et al.
- Status: In force

The Anti-Distracted Driving Act (ADDA), officially designated as Republic Act No. 10913, is a Philippine law that prohibits distracted driving by restricting and penalizing the use of mobile phones and other electronics devices while driving on any public thoroughfare, highway, or street in the Philippines. The republic act defines "distracted driving" as "using mobile communications device to write, send, or read a text-based communication or to make or receive calls" or "using an electronic entertainment or computing device to play games, watch movies, surf the internet, compose messages, read e-books, perform calculations, and other similar acts" while behind the wheel of a moving vehicle or while temporarily stopped at a red light. The law covers all private and public vehicles, including agricultural machines, construction equipment, public utility buses and jeepneys, taxicabs, motorcycles, tricycles, pedicabs, kuligligs and carriages.

== Legislative History ==
On February 3, 2016, Senators Bong Revilla, Jinggoy Estrada and Sergio Osmeña III filed Senate Bill No. 3211 at the Philippine Senate Committee on Public Services which aimed to "safeguard its citizenry from the ruinous and extremely injurious effects of vehicular accidents" caused by the "unrestrained use of electronic mobile devices." Similar legislation was also introduced in the Philippine House of Representatives as House Bill No. 4531 on June 6, 2016, by Tarlac Rep. Susan Yap, Northern Samar Rep. Harlin Abayon, Buhay Party-List Reps. Irwin Tieng and Lito Atienza, Pampanga Rep. Gloria Macapagal Arroyo, Antipolo Rep. Romeo Acop, DIWA Party-List Rep. Emmeline Aglipay, Camarines Sur Rep. Rolando Andaya Jr., Catanduanes Rep. Cesar Sarmiento, Camiguin Rep. Xavier Jesus Romualdo, and Quezon Rep. Angelina Tan.

The road safety measure was submitted by the 16th Congress of the Philippines to President Benigno Aquino III on July 27, 2015, and lapsed into law without the President's signature or veto on July 21, 2016. Under Article 6 of the 1987 Constitution of the Philippines, "the President shall communicate his veto of any bill to the House where it originated within 30 days after the date of receipt thereof; otherwise, it shall become a law as if he had signed it." It also states that a law will take effect 15 days after its publication in at least two newspapers of general circulation.

== Enforcement ==
The Anti-Distracted Driving Act initially took effect on May 18, 2017, under the new administration of President Rodrigo Duterte. After the lifting of its suspension, it resumed on July 6, 2017. Under the law, drivers are only allowed to use hands-free functions of gadgets, such as speaker phones, provided that these do not block their line of sight. The implementing agency is the Land Transportation Office (LTO) under the Department of Transportation that was tasked to promulgate the necessary implementing rules and regulations within 60 days from the law coming into effect. It also ordered the LTO, the Philippine Information Agency, the Department of Education, the Department of the Interior and Local Government and the Philippine National Police (PNP) to undertake a nationwide information, education and communication campaign for a period of six months from the effectivity of the Act. The Metropolitan Manila Development Authority, the PNP and other law enforcement agencies are required to enforce the act.

=== Fines ===
A motorist caught in violation of the Act shall be fined ₱5,000 for the first offense, ₱10,000 for the second offense, and ₱15,000 for the third offense plus suspension of his or her driving license for three months. On the fourth offense, the erring driver shall be fined ₱20,000 plus a revocation of the driving license.

Erring drivers of public utility vehicles, school buses, school service vehicles, and common carriers hauling volatile, flammable or toxic material shall be fined ₱30,000 and suspension of their driving license for three months. The same penalty applies to motorists caught in violation of the Act within a 50-meter (160 ft) radius of school premises.

The LTO (Land Transportation Office), as implementing agency, may increase the amount of fines once every five years, in the amount not exceeding ten percent of the existing rates, which shall take effect only upon publication in at least two newspapers of general circulation.

== Exemptions ==
The Act does not apply to:

- Motorists using mobile phones for emergency purposes, including emergency calls to a law enforcement agency, health care provider, fire department or other emergency services;
- Motorists operating emergency vehicles such as ambulances, fire trucks and other emergency vehicles, in the course and scope of their duties.

== Reaction ==
- Grab and Uber welcomed the implementation of the Anti-Distracted Driving Act and said it would contribute to road safety, benefitting both drivers and commuters. They reminded all their partner-drivers to strictly comply with the new law as they have distributed materials for their drivers to make sure they know what they can and cannot do while transporting their passengers.

== Suspension ==
On May 23, 2017, enforcement of the Act was suspended after it caused confusion among motorists due to lack of proper information dissemination. The House Committee on Transportation asked for a review of the implementing rules and regulations after it was learned that the Land Transportation Office only conducted an awareness campaign for enforcers and not the public at large. The committee pointed out the provision in the law that stipulates that its full implementation should only come after a six-month aggressive information campaign. LTO chief Edgar Galvante admitted the lapse in implementation and said that the LTO does not have the authority to carry out the information drive unless approved first by both chambers of Congress. The House Committee then passed a motion to hold in abeyance the law's implementation. The implementation of the law resumed on July 6, 2017, after the release of the revised Implementing Rules and Regulations (IRR)
