= Margie Eugene-Richard =

American environmentalist

- Born: 1941 (age 84–85)
- Known for: Environmental activism
- Awards: Goldman Environmental Prize (2004)

Margie Eugene-Richard (referred to as Richard; born December 21, 1941) is an African American environmental activist. Richard’s childhood neighborhood, impacted by its proximity to a Shell Oil Company Chemical Plant, inspired her to fight for environmental justice. In addition to forming advocacy groups in her neighborhood, Richard has worked with other communities experiencing similar environmental injustices. Because of her advocacy work, Richard was awarded the Goldman Environmental Prize in 2004.

== Early life ==
Richard grew up in the neighborhood of Old Diamond in Norco, Louisiana, in the middle of an area known as "Cancer Alley". The name “Norco” illustrates the town’s relationship to Shell. In 1961, Norco (New Orleans Refining Company), a Shell affiliate, built a refinery in Norco, Louisiana, called the Motiva refinery. In the 1950s, Shell bought farmland nearby the Motiva refinery, planning on building a chemical plant there.

Richard's grandfather owned land that Shell purchased. Her grandfather then moved his family to a new home 25 feet from the Shell Chemicals plant’s fence line. As a child, Richard recalls smelling bleach-scented scents from the refinery.

== Career and advocacy ==
=== Cancer Alley ===
Norco, Louisiana, which is a part of Cancer Alley, lies between a Shell Chemicals Plant and the Motiva refinery. Over the years, Shell’s plant has grown to be the size of nine football fields and expanded its business to produce fuels, solvents, and other petroleum-based substances.

In 2018, The University Network for Human Rights (UNHR) found that almost half of the children living close to the Shell Chemical Plant endure nosebleeds and headaches. UNHR’s research also found that one-third of residents living in Cancer Alley have irregular breathing and that among the residents of Cancer Alley they surveyed, the p-value for cancer currency is 3.43 percent.

In 1973, a Shell pipeline exploded in Norco. This incident killed an elderly woman and a teenage boy. Because of this event, Richard stated that she knew she would dedicate her life to advocating for environmental justice.

=== Advocacy ===
In 1989, Richard founded Concerned Citizens of Norco, a group of individuals who argued for the resettlement of Old Diamond residents by having Shell purchase residents' homes at market value. Because of the Concerned Citizens of Norco's work, Shell has purchased 200 of the 225 homes in the neighborhood. Most of the residents of these homes have moved to nearby towns.

Richard also worked with environmentalists and researchers to publish a report that explained how, each year, the Shell plant in Norco has released more than 2 million pounds of poisonous chemicals into the air. As a result of her persistence, Shell agreed to lower its emissions by 30 percent in 2000. Shell also agreed to develop their emergency evacuation routes. In addition to this, Norco’s plant cut its emissions by 40 percent by investing $133 million to improve its site.

The Concerned Citizens of Norco continued to hold Shell accountable for the toxic emissions and gained a $5 million community development fund from Shell to relocate the Old Dimond neighborhood. After, Richard worked with Shell to form a plan to improve the environmental health of Norco. She then began advising other neighborhoods to fight against corporate pollution, including the African American community of Westside in Port Arthur, Texas.

In addition to her domestic activism, Richard spoke at the World Summit on Sustainable Development in South Africa in 2002.

== Legacy ==
In 2004, Richard was awarded the Goldman Environmental Prize, given to environmental activists annually to recognize their actions. Richard was the first African American to win the Goldman Environmental Prize.
