= Kalpana Viswanath =

Indian social entrepreneur

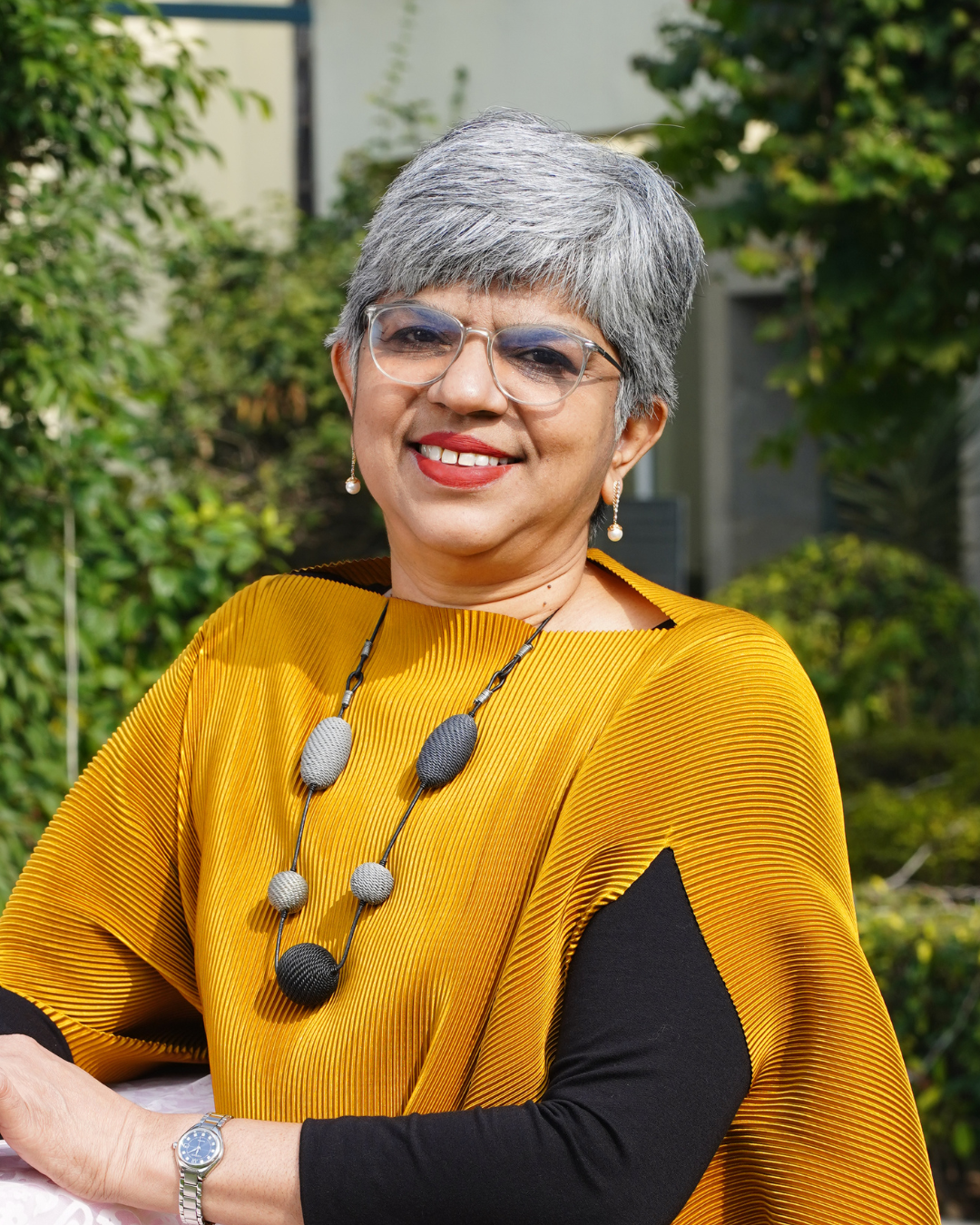
- Occupation: social entrepreneur

Kalpana Viswanath is a social entrepreneur in India. She is the co-founder and CEO of Safetipin, a social enterprise which uses technology and apps to collect data for the safe movement of women in urban spaces. Viswanath is on the advisory board of UN Habitat, International Centre for the Prevention of Crime and SLOCAT. She was part of a study group with Delhi government to prepare a report on Women's Safety in Delhi.

== Career ==
Viswanath studied sociology at the University of Delhi. Her PhD thesis was on ‘A Sociological Analysis of the Contemporary Women’s Movement in India’.

Viswanath served as the director of Jagori Women's Resource Centre from 2000 till 2007. She worked on issues such as migration, trafficking of women workers and violence against women. She also worked with government and non-government stakeholders on the Safe Delhi campaign, which focused on violence against women in public spaces.

Viswanath was a project director for the Gender Inclusive Cities Project with Women in Cities International. The research was carried out in Tanzania, Argentina, Russia and India from January 2009 to March 2012. She is the chair of the International Advisory Committee of Women in Cities International.

She has also worked as a senior advisor at UN Habitat. She created partnerships with government and other stakeholders in New Delhi for the programme on safer cities from April 2010 to September 2013.

In 2013, Viswanath co-founded Safetipin with Ashish Basu. Safetipin addresses the need to combat increasing violence against women and girls in public places, with its app. The platform has been used by individuals as well as urban stakeholders such as governments. Safetipin has worked with various countries, researching and generating reports to make their cities safe for women. Its work includes listing data on the presence of street lights and mapping unsafe routes and transport availability.

Viswanath writes columns for the Hindustan Times, The Wire, and Mint.

== Publications ==
- Viswanath, K., & Basu, A. (2 January 2015). SafetiPin: an innovative mobile app to collect data on women's safety in Indian cities. Gender & Development, 23, 1, 45–60.
- Kalpana, V., & Surabhi, T. M. (28 April 2007). 'Shall We Go out?' Women's Safety in Public Spaces in Delhi. Economic and Political Weekly, 42, 17, 1542–1548.
