= Marji =

Marji is a feminine given name. Notable people with the name include:

- Marji Armstrong (born 1943), Australian horse trainer
- Marji Campi, British actress
- Marjane "Marji" Satrapi, Iranian-born French graphic novelist and film director

== See also ==
- Margie
- Margy
