= Margie E. Lachman =

American psychologist

- Known for: Research on psychosocial behavioral factors that can protect against, minimize, or compensate for declines in cognition and health

Academic background
- Education: Pennsylvania State University

Academic work
- Discipline: Psychology
- Institutions: Brandeis University

Margie E. Lachman is an American psychologist. She is the Minnie and Harold Fierman Professor of Psychology at Brandeis University, director of the Lifespan Developmental Psychology Lab and the director of the Boston Roybal Center for Active Lifestyle Interventions. She was editor of the Journal of Gerontology: Psychological Sciences (2000-2003), and has edited two volumes on midlife development. She is a fellow of the American Psychological Association, Division 20 and the Gerontological Society of America. Lachman's research is in the area of lifespan development with a focus on midlife and later life. Her current work is aimed at identifying psychosocial (e.g., sense of control) and behavioral (e.g., physical exercise) factors that can protect against, minimize, or compensate for declines in cognition (e.g., memory) and health. She is conducting studies to examine long-term predictors of psychological and physical health, laboratory-based experiments to identify psychological and physiological processes involved in aging-related changes, especially in memory, and intervention studies to enhance performance and promote adaptive functioning through active engagement and physical activity.

Lachman has published numerous chapters and journal articles on these topics and has appeared on CBS Sunday Morning and the NPR TED Radio Hour. Lachman was a member of the MacArthur Foundation Research Network on Successful Midlife Development and is currently collaborating on a 20-year longitudinal follow-up of the original MacArthur midlife sample. She has conducted intervention studies designed to enhance the sense of control over memory and physical exercise.

== Selected awards and honors ==
She received the Distinguished Research Achievement Award from the American Psychological Association, Division on Adult Development and Aging in 2003, and the Distinguished Career Contribution to Gerontology Award in Behavioral and Social Sciences from the Gerontological Society of America in 2015. In 2021 she received the Distinguished Mentorship in Gerontology Award from the Gerontological Society of America Division of Behavioral and Social Sciences.

== Selected publications ==
=== Books ===
- Lachman, M. E. (Ed.). (1993). Planning and control processes across the life span. East Sussex: Lawrence Erlbaum Associates Ltd. [Also published as a special issue of the International Journal of Behavioral Development (1993).]
- Lachman, M. E., & James, J. (Eds.). (1997). Multiple paths of midlife development. Chicago: University of Chicago Press.
- Lachman, M. E. (Ed.). (2001). Handbook of midlife development. NY: John Wiley.

=== Journal articles ===
- Lachman, M. E. (2004). Development in midlife. Annual Review of Psychology, 55. 305–331. doi:10.1146/annurev.psych.55.090902.141521.
- Lachman, M. E. (2006). Perceived Control Over Aging-Related Declines: Adaptive Beliefs and Behaviors. Current Directions in Psychological Science. doi:10.1111/j.1467-8721.2006.00453.x.
- Lachman, M. E., et al. (2010). Frequent cognitive activity compensates for education differences in episodic memory. American Journal of Geriatric Psychiatry, 18. 4–10. doi:10.1097/JGP.0b013e3181ab8b62
- Lachman, M. E., Neupert, S.D., & Agrigoroaei, S. (2011) The relevance of control beliefs for health and aging. Handbook of the psychology of aging, 7. 175–190. doi:10.1016/B978-0-12-380882-0.00011-5
- Lachman, M. E., Salom, T., & Agrigoroaei, S. (2015). Midlife as a pivotal period in the life course: Balancing growth and decline at the crossroads of youth and old age. International Journal of Behavioral Development, 39. 20–31. doi:10.1177/0165025414533223
