= Margy =

Margy is a feminine given name. Notable people with the name include:

- Margy Conditt, former Republican member of the Ohio House of Representatives
- Margy Hart, New York City stripteaser
- Margy Kinmonth, British film director and producer
- Margy Osmond, Australian businesswoman
- Margy Reed, birth name of Martha Raye
- Margy Windeyer, Australian librarian and feminist

== See also ==
- Margie
- Marji
