= Driving license in the Philippines =

Philippine driving license
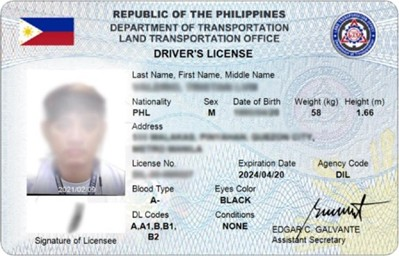
- Front of an LTO Driver's License.
- Type: Driver's license
- Issued by: Philippines
- Valid in: ASEAN; limited period in countries allowing overseas-issued license as substitute
- Eligibility: At least 16–18 years of age depending on type, passage of written and driving exams proctored by the Land Transportation Office; Foreign citizens: at least 18 years of age, at least a month stay and proof intention to stay for at least six months.
- Rights: Permission to drive a motor vehicle in applicable jurisdictions.

A driving license in the Philippines is required before a person is allowed to drive a motor vehicle in the Philippines. It is issued by the Land Transportation Office (LTO) and is mandated by the Land Transportation and Traffic Code (Republic Act No. 4136) passed on June 20, 1964.

However the first driver's licenses were issued under Legislative Act No. 2159 which was passed on February 6, 1912.

== Types ==
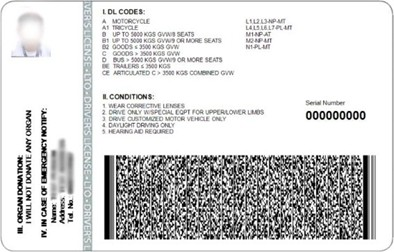
Back of an LTO Driver's License.

There are three types of driving licenses: student permit, non-professional, and professional. The minimum age for driving in the Philippines is 16 years old, provided that the driver has applied for a student permit and is accompanied by a duly licensed person, whether professional or non-professional. An applicant can only apply for a non-professional driver's license one month after acquiring a student permit. An applicant needs to have a non-professional driver's license for six months to be eligible for a professional driver's license. An applicant must pass both a written exam and a driving exam. If the applicant fails the tests, the applicant must wait for a month before being able to take the tests again

== Restriction codes ==
Drivers are assigned a restriction code that designates which type of vehicle they can operate. Restriction codes are based on the kind of vehicle and their gross vehicle weight. A new restriction code system which is similar to the European and United Kingdom version is now in use since January 2021. A driver approved of driving a manual transmission (MT) vehicle is allowed to also drive automatic, whereas those approved for automatic transmission (AT) can not drive manual.

Restriction code	Allowed vehicles
Restriction 1*	Motorbikes or motorized tricycles
Restriction 2*	Motor vehicle up to 4500 kg GVW
Restriction 3	Motor vehicle above 4500 kg GVW
Restriction 4*	Automatic transmission up to 4500 kg GVW
Restriction 5	Automatic transmission above 4500 kg GVW
Restriction 6	Articulated Vehicle 1600 kg GVW & below
Restriction 7	Articulated Vehicle 1601 kg up to 4500 kg GVW
Restriction 8	Articulated Vehicle 4501 kg & above GVW

*Note: Restrictions 1, 2, and 4 only apply to non-professional driver's licenses.

New restriction codes since January 2021

Restriction code	Category	Description
A (Motorbikes) A1 (Tricycles and microcars)	L1, L2, L3, L4, L5, L6, L7	L1 = Two wheels up to 50 kph, L2 = Three wheels up to 50 kph L3 = Two wheel excess of 50 kph L4 = Sidecar tricycle up to 50 kph L5 = Three wheel symmetrical up to 50 kph L6 = 4 wheels with weight up to 350 kg and max speed of 45 kph L7 = 4 wheels with weight up to 550 kg and max speed of 45 kph
B, B1, B2 (Cars and light trucks)	M1, M2, N1	M1 = Vehicles up to 5,000 kg GVW with not more than 8 passenger seats M2 = Vehicles up to 5,000 kg GVW with more than 8 passenger seats N1 = Vehicles carrying goods up to 3,500 kgs GVW
C* (Large trucks)	N2, N3	Vehicles carrying goods exceeding 3,500 kgs GVW
D* (Buses)	M3	M3 = Passenger vehicles above 5,000 kgs GVW with more than 8 seats
BE* (Articulated car)	O1, O2	O1 = Articulated vehicle not more than 750 kgs GVW O2 = Articulated vehicle exceeding 750 up to 3,500 kgs GVW
CE* (Articulated truck)	O3	O3 - Articulated vehicle exceeding 3,500 kgs GVW

*Note: DL codes C, D, BE and CE only apply to professional driver’s licenses.

== Condition code ==
Applicants are assessed during application if they have certain impairments that could impede their driving capability. They are then assigned a condition code(s) if they fall within a category.

Condition code	Requirement
Condition A/1	Wear eyeglasses
Condition B/2	Drive with special equipment for upper limbs*
Condition C/2	Drive with special equipment for lower limbs*
Condition 3	Customized vehicle only
Condition D/4	Daylight driving only*
Condition E/5	Should always be accompanied by a person without hearing impairment

*Note: Special driving conditions and special equipment to be used shall be the assessed by a Land Transportation Office driver evaluator.

== Use in other countries ==
=== ASEAN member states ===
The Kuala Lumpur Agreement of 1985 authorizes holders of driving licenses issued by the government of an Association of Southeast Asian Nations (ASEAN) member state to drive in any ASEAN country without the need for an international driving permit.

=== Australia ===
Overseas licenses are allowed to be used in Australia for a period of three months, with some allowing six months for visitors with a permanent visa. Permanent Australian residents are obliged to apply for an Australian driver's license, with some states requiring it.

=== Spain ===
As of April 16, 2010, an agreement was signed between the Filipino and Spanish governments allowing Filipinos to use their Philippine driver's license in Spain.

== Foreign driving license ==
Foreigners who hold a valid driver's license issued by the road authority of their home country can drive in the Philippines for up to 90 days upon arrival provided that their license is written in English. If the license is not in English, an official English translation from the local embassy of the issuing country is required.

Holders of driving licenses issued by any ASEAN member-state government are allowed to drive in the Philippines.
