= Marji Armstrong =

Australian equestrian

Marji Armstrong is one of the pioneers of the classical philosophy of horsemanship in Australia. She has taught these classical principles to students around the world for the past two decades, both in person and via the internet, and now shares her thoughts and experience on Marji's Blog.

In addition, as a result of 25 years of genetic development within her herd of horses, she has registered a new breed of performance horse, the Spanish Warmblood.

== Early life ==
Marjorie Jean Armstrong (née McInnes) was born in Mortlake, Victoria, Australia on 18 September 1943. She was named after Marjorie Lawrence (soprano), who her mother admired so much that she wanted to name her daughter after her.

She grew up in the Australian bush, working with livestock on her family’s property in the Western District of Victoria, followed as a young adult by experience on the land in outback Queensland and Western Australia. Following her move to WA in 1966, she married Anthony Gordon (Tony) Armstrong in 1968. The family, including son [redacted] (b. 1969), owned a mixed farming operation near Cranbrook, Western Australia.

In the early years of the marriage, the family ran the farm as well as several small rural business operations, including a local transport company (operated until Tony’s death in 2007), and a shearing contracting business. With her husband doing the shearing, Marji was the cook and part-time rouseabout.

In partnership with her sister-in-law Rosemary McInnes, Marji started "Bushman’s Bazaar", an early cottage industry specialising in home made products including spun and knitted goods, jams, preserves and morning and afternoon teas for tourist buses. She was instrumental in forming a local tourism promotion group for the Cranbrook area.

In 1986, Marji opened an equestrian centre dedicated to Classical Equestrian Arts in Forrestfield, Perth, which she ran until moving it back to Cranbrook in 1999. In 1985, she purchased her Spanish Andalusian stallion, Dulcero, from the van der Drift family in Qld and was influential in the re-formation of the then defunct Western Australian Branch of the Andalusian Horse Association of Australasia.

During these years she competed successfully in FEI dressage, horse trials and the show ring before switching to teaching and training. She held an International Competitors License for several years.

== Influences ==
As a child, Marji came under the influence of Franz Mairinger, trainer of Australia’s double gold medal winning eventing team at the 1960 Rome Olympics. Mairinger regularly conducted clinics in Victoria’s Western Districts where she was a young pony club member. Marji first encountered the teaching and riding of Mestre Nuno Oliveira in 1984 when he was in Australia. She organised his clinics in Western Australia until his death in Perth in 1989.

Nuno Oliveira inspired her with a philosophy of working in cooperation with the horse, rather than achieving results by domination. The ultimate aim of this approach is lightness, in which the aids become mere suggestions, and the horse is able to maintain its own balance without interference. She illustrates this with a demonstration of lungeing her Spanish Warmblood gelding Yardah Tosco using only knitting wool in place of the conventional lunge rein.

Marji trained in Europe with acknowledged masters including Luis Valenca Rodrigues, Nuno Oliveira’s son Joao (after his father’s death) and the Ecole Nationale de Equitation (Le Cadre Noir) at Saumur, France. She attended a performance of Theatre Equestre Zingaro, where she met Bartabas, the creator of the performance.

She has been a passionate scholar of classical horse training during her odyssey around the world.

== Training philosophy ==
Marji’s training philosophy is founded in the classical school of dressage whose roots extend back to Xenophon, through Pignatelli, Pluvinel, William Cavendish, first Duke of Newcastle, de la Gueriniere, Baucher and Fillis.

In circa 1995, Marji became a world pioneer by including classical in-hand training as a regular feature of every clinic, introducing thousands of students worldwide to the importance of in-hand training. Her adherence to classical methods was considered controversial in the early years, when Germanic training philosophies held sway. Now that the current generation of riders have begun to recognise the benefits of training the horse in-hand, Marji’s approach is acknowledged as correct and beneficial for the minds and bodies of horses of all shapes, sizes and breeds.

The basis of her training is her five-day clinic for horse and rider. She has trained horses and riders in South Africa, Zimbabwe, UK, Austria, Italy, U.S.A., Canada, New Zealand, Asia and Australia. During her 45 world tours since 1992, she has introduced over 15,000 students internationally to the training of horses according to the classical principles.

Marji encourages and challenges her pupils’ personal boundaries. She believes it is possible to develop riders and horses beyond their natural talent to their ultimate potential through systematic training—in hand first, and then from the saddle.

Her training benefits all breeds and ages of horse and rider, in multiple disciplines, and can produce remarkable results with horses which, in some cases, are physically challenged or psychologically disturbed by previous training, breed or age. As well as experienced riders and horses, first-time clinic participants and beginner horses or riders can produce work in the soft manner espoused by the classical masters.

All clinics are video taped, with more than 3,000 hours of clinic videos held. The tapes provide proof of the value of the work and training philosophy.

== Achievements ==
Marji competed successfully in FEI dressage, horse trials and the show ring.

In 1989, Marji was invited to ride Philippe Karl's horse, Odin, at the Le Cadre Noir in Saumur, France.

Marji is an international judge, judging at the National Andalusian Championships in New Zealand in 1998, and was a judge at the Andalusian National Championships in Canberra in 1993.

In 1993, she was invited to ride the horses of the Prime Minister of Malaysia.

In 1996, she was a speaker at the National Championships in Texas, USA, for the IALHA (International Andalusian & Lusitano Horse Association).

Marji was an Educator at Equitana Melbourne in 1999 and Equitana Sydney in 2011. In 1999, a team of her students performed a quadrille depicting a Baroque Carousel at the inaugural Equitana in Melbourne.

In 2006, Marji was a Western Australian finalist in the RIRDC Rural Women’s Award.

Marji has trained a wide range of people, from those who have been physically challenged, to royalty, to celebrities, and everyone in between. Well known singer, Shania Twain, attended two of Marji's clinics, and was so impressed that she brought her own trainer to a clinic.

Marji has taught in every Australian state except the Northern Territory.

== Breeding enterprise ==
At Yardah Stud and Equestrian Centre in Western Australia, Marji also runs a breeding operation. After 25 years of development, she has registered a new breed of horse, the Spanish Warmblood. Some of the horses she has produced are competing at International and National level. Yardah Ximenez (now retired in the U.K.) competed in Europe in both showjumping and dressage to Prix St. George, while Yardah Cairo placed in national level showjumping competitions in Perth in 2011.

Realising that a project of this magnitude needs to be achieved over decades, Marji has made the decision to invite her students and other enthusiasts to become members and part owners of Yardah Stud. This opportunity will be launched later in 2016.

== Published works ==
Passive Stretching Exercises for the Horse has been published as an e-book, and is available by registering.

Training Demystified covers the philosophy of Classical training as well as providing practical direction. The text is fully edited, and is awaiting illustration and graphic design. She has also produced a series of training DVDs, which cover the in–hand training of the horse. The DVDs were due to be released in 2012, but this was postponed due to Marji having a stroke in Austria in October 2012. Following the stroke, Marji has undergone "Marji's Renaissance", and is now riding and teaching again, and after initially "losing her words" after the stroke, she is now confident enough to initiate a blog.
