= Safetipin =

Indian social organisation

Safetipin is a social organisation working with a wide range of urban stakeholders including governments to make public spaces safer and more inclusive for women. Safetipin collects data using 3 mobile phone applications (My Safetipin, which is available on the app store and play store; Safetipin Nite and Safetipin Site) and present this to relevant stakeholders with recommendations. The apps also generate a safety score based on the data collected and provide it in the My Safetipin app for users to make safe and informed decisions about their mobility.

== Organization and mission ==
Based in India, Safetipin aims to make cities safer by providing data collected through technology tools and apps to its users. The data is collected and analysed on parameters that impact safety and walkability. Its end goal is to achieve movement without fear for women. It was co-founded by gender rights' activist Kalpana Viswanath and Ashish Basu in 2013.

== How it works ==
Using three apps, including My Safetipin, Safetipin Nite and Safetipin Site, it maps the entire street network as well as key public spaces such as transport hubs, parks, markets etc., in a city. The nine parameters used by Safetipin to calculate safety are lighting, openness, visibility, people, security guards, walk path, public transport, gender usage, feeling, all pertaining to a certain area. Bus stops and metro stations are also included to review the safety status around them.

== App features ==
Safetipin enables the users with some key features such as, selecting a place to stay based on the safety score of the neighbourhood, driving or walking using the safest route, finding the nearest safe place and heading there, asking a friend to track them and get notifications if there is a problem, receiving notifications when in an unsafe place.

== Recent initiatives ==
Safetipin, in Delhi, has mapped low income areas and areas adjacent to metro stations since 2013, in order to find localities with poor lighting conditions. Based on its data the Delhi government fixed the existing streetlights and installed additional street lights and an increase in police patrolling. In 2018, the government approached the organization to do a fresh mapping to measure change as well as point out other safety concerns in the city.

In 2016, Bogota city was mapped using the app on the 230 km of bike path. The resultant data was used by the local government to improve lighting along the street, identify the locations for CCTV cameras and bike stands so as to make women feel safer using the bike paths after dark. A symbolic event, ‘Women Taking the Night’ was also held in the city after the report by Safetipin, where women walkers were joined by top government officials to walk the reportedly unsafe areas together.

The focus of the project by Safetipin in Hanoi was on mapping urban transport for Hanoi Metro Line 3.

== Awards ==
- Lotus Leadership Award 2019
- Womanity Award 2018
- Dubai Award
- Global Urban Innovator
- Prixars
- Avon Most Innovative Campaign
- mBillionth Award
