= Margie Peden =

South African public health researcher

- Education: University of Cape Town (PhD)
- Known for: Global road safety
- Scientific career
- Workplaces: World Health Organization; George Institute for Global Health
- Thesis: Adult Pedestrian Traffic Trauma in Cape Town : with Special Reference to the Role of Alcohol. (1997)

Margie Peden was a South African public health researcher and injury prevention expert who served as Head of the Global Injury Programme at the George Institute for Global Health, and co-director of the WHO Collaborating Centre on Injury Prevention and Trauma Care. Formerly, she was the lead coordinator of the Unintentional Injury Prevention (UIP) Unit at the World Health Organization for 17 years.

== Education ==
Peden earned her PhD at the University of Cape Town in 1997.

== Career ==
In 2000, she joined the World Health Organization. She acted as coordinator of the WHO Global Road Safety Program from 2004 to 2010.

She served as global coordinator for the RS10 (Road Safety in 10 Countries) initiative, funded by Bloomberg Philanthropies. She also founded the Global Injury Prevention Network, a platform for collaboration and knowledge sharing among injury prevention professionals worldwide.

Her last role was Head of the Global Injury Programme at the George Institute, University of Oxford, and co-director of the WHO Collaborating Centre on Injury Prevention and Trauma Care at the George Institute with Rebecca Ivers.

Peden was invited to advise the United Nations Road Safety Fund: Platform on Health and Road Safety to identify impactful road safety initiatives and to advise funding allocation decisions supporting Sustainable Development Goal 3.6 to reduce the number of road traffic deaths and injuries by half by 2030.

== Research ==
Peden's work focused on injury prevention in resource-limited countries and made significant contributions in the field of global road safety. Her career achievements include leading the development of the first comprehensive global status report on road safety and three subsequent Global Status Reports on Road Safety, providing a baseline for monitoring progress on road safety worldwide.

She was the lead author of the World Report on Road Traffic Injury Prevention, published by WHO in 2004, which has been influential in shaping road safety policy globally.

Peden was an author of the Disease Control Priorities 3 (DCP3) chapter "Road traffic injuries."

She co-authored the 2022 Road Safety series in The Lancet with Adnan Hyder.

== Honors and awards ==
She held honorary positions at the University of New South Wales, Imperial College London, and in the Department of International Health at Johns Hopkins University Bloomberg School of Public Health.
