= Land Transportation Office =

Government agency in the Philippines

- Tanggapan ng Transportasyong Panlupa

Agency overview
- Formed: June 20, 1964; 62 years ago
- Superseding agency: Land Transportation
- Headquarters: East Avenue, Diliman, Quezon City
- Minister responsible: Atty. Giovanni Z. Lopez, Acting Secretary of the Department of Transportation
- Agency executive: Markus V. Lacanilao, Assistant Secretary/Chief
- Parent agency: Department of Transportation
- Website: lto.gov.ph

The Land Transportation Office (LTO; Filipino: Tanggapan ng Transportasyong Panlupa) is an agency of the Philippine government under the Department of Transportation responsible for all land transportation in the Philippines. Functions of the LTO include the inspection and registration of motor vehicles, issuance of licenses and permits, enforcement of land transportation rules and regulations, and adjudication of traffic cases.

Its primary mission is to rationalize land transportation services and facilities, and effectively implement various transportation laws, rules, and regulations. It believes that it is the responsibility of those involved in the public service to be more vigilant in their part in the over-all development scheme of national leadership. Hence, the promotion of safety and comfort in land travel is one of LTO's continuing commitments. It aims to be a frontline government agency that showcases fast and efficient public service for a progressive land transport sector.

== History ==
There were several predecessors before the formation of the present Land Transportation Office.

=== Automobile Section ===
In order to regulate and license of operators for motor vehicles in the Philippines, Act No. 2159 was enacted in 1912 under the American colonial Insular Government. This was the first formal law on land transportation in the country. It created the Automobile Section under the Administrative Division of the Bureau of Public Works.

In 1926, Act No. 3045 compiled and incorporated all laws governing motor vehicles. The Automobile Section was upgraded to the Automobile Division but still under the supervision of the Bureau of Public Works. Act No. 3992 (Revised Motor Vehicle Law) was enacted in 1933, amending Act No. 3045. The Automobile Division was renamed Division of Motor Vehicles.

=== Motor Vehicles Office ===
In 1945, the Department of Public Works and Highways issued Department Order No. 4 for the reorganization of the Division. It took effect after the Philippines were liberated from the Japanese during World War II. Executive Order No. 94 was promulgated in 1947 reorganizing the different executive

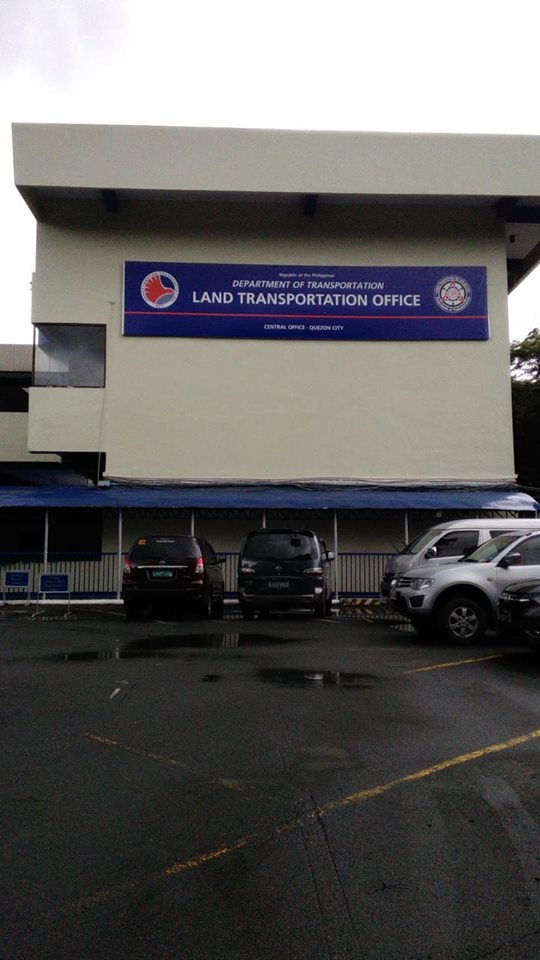
Central Office of the Land Transportation Office in Quezon City

departments, bureaus, and offices. Under Section 82 of E.O. 94, the Division of Motor Vehicles was upgraded into the Motor Vehicles Office (MVO) with the category of the Bureau. However, the Motor Vehicle Office was abolished in 1964 by Republic Act No. 4136 or the Land Transportation and Traffic Code. The Land Transportation and Traffic Code was an act that compiled all the laws relative to transportation and traffic rules, to create a land transportation commission and for other purposes. This act was eventually replaced by the Land Transportation Commission. The Land Transportation Commission was tasked with the registration and operation of motor vehicles and the licensing of conductors and drivers. In order for the commission to effectively carry out its duty, regional offices were established in various parts of the country. Additionally, the powers, functions, and duties previously conferred on the Chief of the Motor Vehicles are now performed by the Land Transportation Commissioner.

=== Land Transportation Commission ===
During the Marcos dictatorship, Executive Order No. 546 was promulgated in 1979, creating the Ministry of Transportation and Communications (MOTC). The Land Transportation Commission was renamed into Bureau of Land Transportation and was absorbed into that ministry. The creation of the Board of Transportation and the Bureau of Land Transportation was nullified in 1985 by Executive Order 1011. The E.O. established the Land Transportation Commission, which was tasked to perform functions such as registering motor vehicles, licensing of drivers and conductors, franchising of public utility vehicles and enforcing land transportation rules and regulations.

=== Establishment of the Land Transportation Office ===
The Land Transportation Commission was abolished in 1987, and two offices were created, namely the Land Transportation Office (LTO) and the Land Transportation Franchising and Regulatory Board (LTFRB). The LTO took over the functions of the former BLT while the LTFRB took over the functions of the BOT. The MOTC was likewise renamed as the Department of Transportation and Communications (DOTC).

== Functions and mandate ==
=== License and permit issuance ===
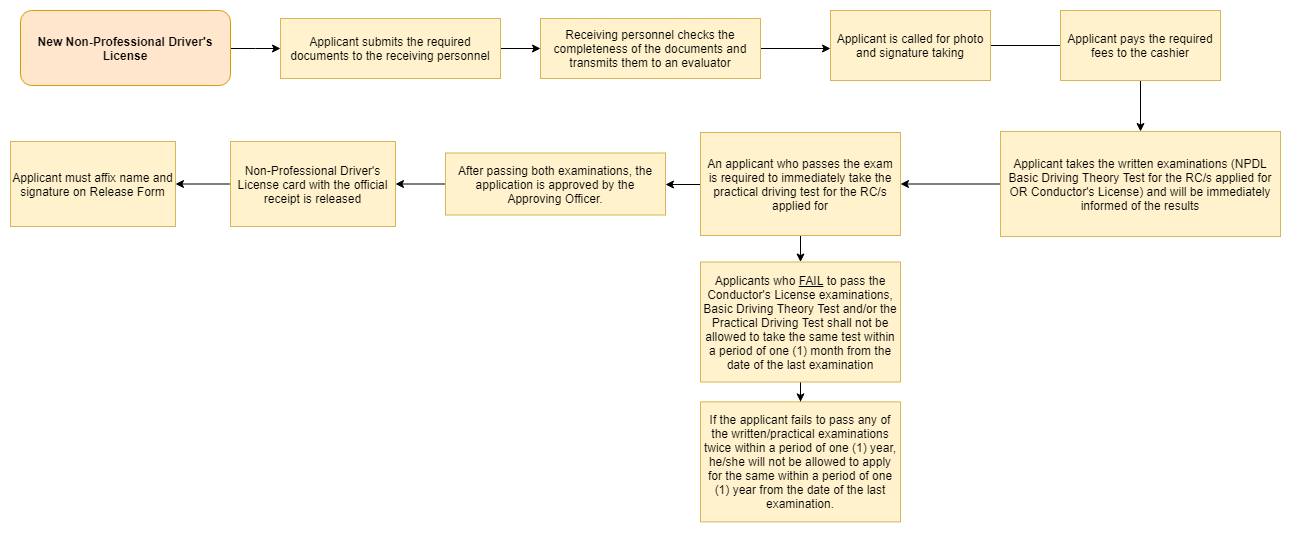
Application procedure for a Non-Professional Driver's License under the LTO

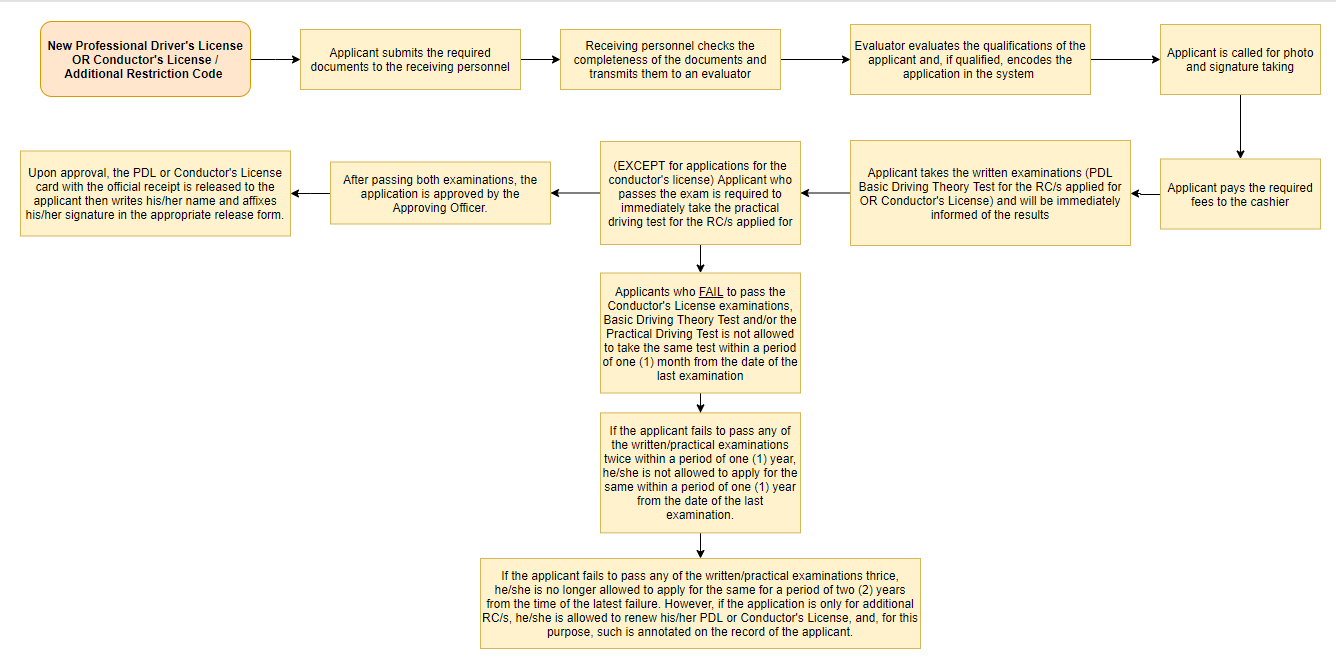
Application procedure for a Professional Driver's License under the LTO

The LTO is in charge of the issuance, renewal, and regulation of driver's licenses. It can issue licenses to both citizens and foreigners provided that they meet the requirements for those licenses. The LTO provides the non-professional driver's license, which allows holders to operate vehicles under the restriction codes 1,2, and 4. It also provides the professional driver's license, which allows the bearer to operate vehicles under all 8 restriction codes. The LTO also issues student permits (SP), which are a primary requirement for both the non-professional and professional driver's licenses. All applicants are also required to pass both a written and practical examination to be granted their license. The application process for any license or permit may be done at any LTO Licensing Center and District/Extension Office.

=== Motor vehicle registration ===
The LTO is responsible for the registration of motor vehicles and renewals. It can register brand new vehicles, including locally manufactured vehicles, imported vehicles, light electric vehicles, low speed vehicles, three wheeled vehicles, and tax exempt vehicles. Each category has an obligatory set of requirements and procedures to follow to be fully registered. Renewals are also obligated to submit the necessary requirements and to follow procedures to be fully renewed. For additional guidance on LTO online services, vehicle registration, and related transactions, see LTO Portal Philippines. The LTO also oversees miscellaneous transactions, specifically transactions requiring change of certificate of registration, and transactions that do not require the change of certificate of registration.

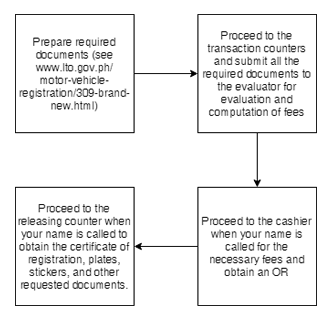
Procedure for the registration of Motor Vehicles under the LTO

=== Law enforcement and adjudication of cases ===
One of the main functions of the LTO is to strictly implement and enforce the laws regarding land transportation. Necessary requirements and procedures are to be followed in settlements of admitted cases and contested cases of motor vehicles, plates, and driver's licenses. The LTO also follows a strict procedure in settlements of impounded violations. It also allows private and for hire motor vehicles to apply for duplicate plates.

Furthermore, the LTO is in charge of ensuring that public land transportation services abide by the fares set by the LTFRB. It has sanctions for the overcharging and undercharging of fares, and for non-issuance of fare tickets.

=== Manufacturers, assemblers, importers, and dealers reporting (MAIDR) ===
The LTO grants accreditation to certain manufacturers, assemblers, importers, and dealers who wish to transact business with the LTO. A firm, person, or corporation must file an application for accreditation with Assistant Secretary of the Land Transportation Office containing certain requirements and qualifications in order to transact business with the LTO relative to Motor Vehicles or its components. It also issues the Certificate of Stock Reported (CSR) which certifies that a motor vehicle or its component has already been reported by its manufacturer, assembler, or importer to MAIDRS. The LTO also requires sales reports that inform the LTO that the reported stock is already sold to the end-user. Sales reports include regular sales transactions and stock transfers. It also reports the issuance of a single CSR, of Motor Vehicles (MVs) formed out of combining components (new, used, or previously registered) MV/MC that are undocumented in a procedure called special reporting. The LTO also maintains the processes that facilitate requests for the approval of the MAID office with LTO related transactions. Such transactions include the issuance of a conduction sticker, a public bidding of a motor vehicle, and the stamping of chassis identification number.

== Organizational structure ==
In 1987, under section 11 of Executive Order No. 125, the Regional Offices of the Land Transportation Commission were abolished and their functions were transferred to the Regional Offices for Land Transportation. The newly renamed Department of Transportation and Communication was placed under the authority of the Secretary of Transportation and Communication. As with the Land Transportation Commission before it, the Land Transportation Office is an office under the Department of Transportation and is headed by the Assistant Secretary for Land Transportation, who is appointed by the President upon the recommendation of the Secretary.

== 2024 gun attack ==
On May 24, 2024, LTO Registration Section Chief, Mercedita E. Gutierrez was ambushed by an unidentified motorcycle-riding hitman. The attack was perpetrated near the corner of K-H Street near Kamias Road, Barangay Pinyahan, Quezon City at 6:20 pm. After sustaining gunshot wounds, she was brought to the nearby East Avenue Medical Center but was pronounced dead on arrival. The Quezon City Police District launched a criminal investigation forming Special Investigation Task Group, SITG “Gutierrez,” led by Colonel Amante Daro, QCPD Acting Deputy District Director for Operations.

On May 25, the "SITG" arrested a suspect named “Danny” in Batasan Hills. According to DILG Secretary Benhur Abalos, he was taken into pre-trial detention and underwent inquest.

== Branches ==
To service the entirety of the country, the LTO has established many branches in the different regions of the Philippines:

- Region I – Aguila Road, Brgy. Sevilla, San Fernando City, La Union
- Region II – San Gabriel, Tuguegarao, Cagayan
- Region III – Government Center, Brgy. Maimpis, City of San Fernando, Pampanga
- Region IVA – J. C. Abadilla Memorial Bldg., Old City Hall Compound, B. Morada Ave., Lipa City Batangas
- Region IVB – MIMAROPA – LTO Compd., East Avenue, QC.
- Region V – Regional Govt. Center Site, Rawis, Legaspi City
- Region VI – Tabuc-Suba, Jaro, Iloilo City
- Region VII – Natalio Bacalso Avenue, Cebu City
- Region VIII – Old Army Road, Tacloban City
- Region IX – Veterans Ave., Zamboanga City/Balangasan St., Pagadian
- Region X – MVIS Compound, Zone 7, Bulua, Cagayan de Oro City
- Region XI – Quimpo Blvd., Davao City
- Region XII – ARMM Compound, Cotabato City/No. 79 G. Del Pilar St., Koronadal City, South Cotabato
- National Capital Region (NCR) – #20 G. Araneta Avenue, Brgy. Sto Domingo, Q.C.
- Negros Island Region (NIR) – Brgy, Hda. Mayawsayaw, Bacolod City
- Cordillera Administrative Region (CAR) – Engineer's Hill, Baguio City/2nd Flr., Post Office Loop, Session Road, Baguio City
- Caraga – J. Rosales Avenue, Butuan City

== Projects ==
The Land Transportation Office is in charge of various projects which aims to improve its functions and mandates.

=== Land Transportation Office Infrastructure and Information System (LTO-IIS) Project ===
In 2012, the Department of Transportation and Communication and the Land Transportation Office introduced a project entitled the Land Transportation Office Infrastructure and Information System (LTO-IIS) which aims to utilize information and communication technology to enhance the functional efficiency of the LTO in the delivery of its front line services to the public and the performance of its mandate. LTO-IIS involves building an IT network for the LTO which can host and support its Front and Back Office Applications in order to computerize and automate its processes and services, develop its database information system, and provide interconnection between and among LTO offices nationwide. In short, the LTO-IIS serves as an efficient means to process motor vehicle registrations, renewal and application of drivers’ licenses and permits, back-end transactions, apprehensions, and such ancillary transactions or processes. This new LTO-IT system aimed to make accessing relevant vehicle information easier for authorities especially for tracing stolen vehicles while addressing issues including the involvement of third-party providers with key data such as vehicle registration. The IT system overhaul was estimated to cost P8.2-billion.

=== 5-year Validity of Drivers’ Licenses ===
August 29, 2017 marked the beginning of the five-year validity of drivers' licenses cards issued by the LTO. Applications were accepted beginning October 2016 for driver's licenses as well as renewals with five-year validity, however, issues with the printers' contracts stalled the card printing for almost one year resulting in a backlog of 3.6 million driver's licenses which only began to be processed September 2017.

Republic Act (RA) No. 10930 effectively amended Section 23 of Republic Act No. 4136, otherwise known as the "Land Transportation (LTO) and Traffic Code" which was signed on August 2, 2017, by President Rodrigo Duterte to extend the validity of the driver's license from three years to five years. According to the law, "Except for student permits, all drivers' licenses shall be valid for five years reckoned from the birthdate of the licensee, unless sooner revoked or suspended."

This amendment also added that holders of nonprofessional and professional driver's licenses who do not commit violations in RA 4136 or any other traffic laws during the five-year period "shall be entitled to a renewal of such license of 10 years, subject to the restrictions as may be imposed by the LTO."

Besides the amendments to the law, new improvements to the quality and security of the license cards were introduced. The old cards with three-year validity were made from PVC, thermally printed, and had limited security features. The new plastic license cards are laser engraved and made of polycarbonate material which are more durable. The new cards also includes several new security features.

The Transportation Secretary, Arthur Tugade, and LTO chief Assistant Secretary, Edgar Galvante, led the official rollout.

== Controversies ==
=== Fixers ===
The Land Transportation Office and their various constituent branches and offices are notorious for their corrupt employees who engage in the malpractice of hiring and colluding with 'fixers’ to illicitly garner more income. Fixers litter the various branches of the LTO, offering faster and/or easier transactions and procurement of official LTO paraphernalia at a more expensive price than the standard fee. These fixers and their employers pocket the extra payment in exchange for placing a client higher up in the queuing system, falsifying official government documents, fabricating driving test and written test results, and many other illegal practices.

Section 11 of Republic Act No. 9485, the Anti-Red Tape Act of 2007 lists fixing and/or collusion with fixers as a grave offense, with the penalty being dismissal and perpetual disqualification from public service. The fixers themselves can receive a penalty of imprisonment not exceeding six years or a fine not less than twenty thousand pesos (P20,000.00) but not more than two hundred thousand pesos (P200,000.00) or both fine and imprisonment at the discretion of the court.

=== Private Motor Vehicle Inspection System corruption scandal ===
The Private Motor Vehicle Inspection controversy involved allegations of corruption that the 800-million Php fund fraud drying of the LTO-PMVIC wherein the charge of 1500-1800 Php for each private vehicle inspection another 900 Php in case it fails the first inspection and to give benefited high-ranking officials and car inspection centers.

Senator Grace Poe vowed to recommend to the Senate blue ribbon an investigation into the alleged scandals and anomalies in the Private Motor Vehicle Inspection Centers (PMVICs), specifically on the deals of Department of Transportation (DOTr) with the private inspection centers.

Poe warned that passing the mandate of vehicle inspection from DOTr to the private sector may have legal infirmities.

The senator lamented that even without an exhaustive public consultation and public information campaign, DOTr and LTO still issued a memorandum order on December 29, 2020, directing the immediate implementation of PMVIC in the middle of the COVID-19 pandemic.

The Senate urges DOTr to cancel PMVIC operations on February 17, 2021.

=== 2023 Shortage of Plastic License Cards ===
The LTO, being the primary agency responsible for issuing driver's licenses in the country, has encountered a significant shortage of plastic cards used for issuing and renewing licenses. This shortage has resulted in long queues, delays, and frustrations for individuals in need of licenses. The LTO has been utilizing temporary paper licenses as an interim solution, but this has proven to be insufficient and inconvenient for both applicants and law enforcement agencies. This shortage has caused significant inconvenience and delays for thousands of individuals seeking to obtain or renew their driver's licenses.
