= Reputation and Rarities =

Compilation album by Dusty Springfield
- Released: 1997
- Recorded: 1989–1990 in London, England, New York & Hollywood, United States
- Genre: Pop; dance
- Length: 61:47
- Label: EMI; Disky Communications
- Producer: Pet Shop Boys; Julian Mendelsohn; Dan Hartman; Paul O'Duffy; Andy Richards; Climie Fisher; Steve Tyrell

Alternative cover
- Disky re-release with alternative cover art.

Professional ratings
Review scores
Source	Rating
AllMusic	3/5 stars

Reputation and Rarities is a repackaged/re-released version of British singer Dusty Springfield's 1990 studio album, Reputation.

== Background ==
In late 1987, there was a resurgence of interest in Springfield's career, which was a direct result of her work with Pet Shop Boys on the duet "What Have I Done to Deserve This?", released in November of the same year. The single reached #2 in the US Billboard Hot 100 and #2 in the UK Singles Chart, Springfield's highest simultaneous charting single ever. Springfield then worked with Pet Shop Boys on two further solo singles "Nothing Has Been Proved", originally from the film Scandal, and "In Private", both UK Top 20 hits for Springfield in 1989. The culmination of Springfield's new success was the album Reputation, released in 1990. The original album was released only in the UK and reached #18 in the UK Albums Chart, Springfield's first hit album in her native country in over twenty years.

== 1997 release ==
In 1997, the album was re-released (this time in America as well) as Reputation and Rarities, and included the entire Reputation album, along with two tracks recorded for the album, but never used or released until then, the ballads "Any Other Fool", written by Diane Warren and Robbie Buchanan, and "When Love Turns to Blue", a collaboration with British pop duo Climie Fisher. Also included was "Getting It Right", written and produced by Steve Tyrell in early 1989 for the British movie of the same name, first released as one of the B-sides to the single "Reputation", and the original 12" mix of the biggest hit from the album, "In Private".

Reputation and Rarities was subsequently given a second re-release by EMI's European mid-price label Disky Communications, then repackaged with a third set of cover art.

This release, with original 1997 cover art, is the only form of Reputation album available in digital distribution and streaming from Warner Music Group, current holder of album's copyrights.

== Track listing ==
1. "Reputation" (Brian Spence) – 4:14
2. "Send It to Me" (Allee Willis, Lauren Wood) – 3:57
3. "Arrested by You" (Rupert Hine, Jeanette Obstoj) – 4:11
4. "Time Waits for No One" (Holly Knight, Dan Hartman) – 3:06
5. "Born This Way" (Geoffrey Williams & Simon Stirling) – 3:50
6. "In Private" (Neil Tennant, Chris Lowe) – 4:22
7. "Daydreaming" (Tennant, Lowe) – 4:57
8. "Nothing Has Been Proved" (Tennant, Lowe) – 4:42
9. "I Want to Stay Here" (Gerry Goffin, Carole King) – 2:49
10. "Occupy Your Mind" (Tennant, Lowe) – 6:49

=== Bonus tracks ===
1. "Any Other Fool" (Diane Warren, Robbie Buchanan) – 4:24
2. "When Love Turns to Blue" (Climie Fisher) – 3:44
3. "Getting It Right" (Steve Tyrell, Stephanie Tyrell, Colin Townes) – 3:38
4. "In Private" (12" Version) (Lowe, Tennant) – 7:11

== Personnel for bonus tracks ==
"Any Other Fool"

- Producer: Andy Richards
- Engineer: Julian Mendelsohn
- Background vocals: Simon Bell
- Recorded at Sarm West (London)/Townhouse Recording Studios (London)
- Recording dates: between December 1989 and January 1990
- Originally unissued

"When Love Turns to Blue"

- Producer: Climie Fisher
- Engineer: Pete Schee
- Background vocals: not credited but likely Simon Climie and Rob Fisher
- Recorded at Metropolis Studios (London)
- Recording date: 16 August 1989
- Originally unissued

"Getting It Right"

- Producer: Steve Tyrell
- Musical arranger: Guy Moon
- Recorded at Tyrell Studios, Hollywood
- Recording date: February 1989
- First UK release: Parlophone 12" single 12RX 6253 (B-side of "Reputation" special edition)
- UK release date: May 1990
- First US release: unissued

== Sources ==
- Howes, Paul (2007). The Complete Dusty Springfield (Revised and expanded edition). London: Reynolds & Hearn Ltd. ISBN 1-905287-39-9, ISBN 978-1-905287-39-0
