= Claire dela Fuente =

Filipina singer and businesswoman (1958–2021)

- dela Fuente in 2020

Background information
- Born: Clarita Crisostomo Dela Fuente; December 28, 1958
- Died: March 30, 2021 (aged 62) Las Piñas, Philippines
- Genre: OPM
- Years active: 1978–2021
- Labels: Dyna; Viva Records
- Spouse: Moises "Boy" de Guzman (m. 1978)
- Website: www.clairedelafuente.com

Clarita Crisostomo Dela Fuente-De Guzman, known professionally as Claire dela Fuente (Tagalog pronunciation: [dɛla ˈfwentɛ dɛ ɡʊsˈman]; December 28, 1958 – March 30, 2021) was a Filipino singer and businesswoman.

She first became known for singing the jingle for a 1978 commercial for Hope, and later for performing the song "Sayang".

== Early life and education ==
Dela Fuente hails from Caloocan and was born on December 28, 1958. A rotund child at age nine, Dela Fuente was bullied for her weight. As a high school student she sold perfume, cosmetics, and shampoo acquired from Divisoria and Quinta to her classmates. She studied at the University of the East

== Singing career ==
Dela Fuente was 15 years old when she won the grand prize in at a singing contest at the University of the East. She sang the Carpenters' "Love Me for What I Am". She was scouted by George Canseco, who was the head judge of the competition.

Canseco facilitated Dela Fuente's first national television appearance when she sang the jingle for a 1978 commercial for Hope cigarette.

Initially she leveraged herself as the "Hope girl" to secure more projects. Her recordings of "This Girl Has Turned into a Woman" and "Take My Hand For Awhile" did not saw much success.

She joined Dyna Records where she became well known for her performance of the song "Sayang". The song is an adaptation of a Malaysian song. Marilyn Villapando introduced Filipino lyrics to create "Sayang".

Dela Fuente was often compared to American singer Karen Carpenter.

She was given various sobriquets such as "Asia's Sweetest Voice" and "Queen of Tagalog Songs". She was also considered a "Jukebox Queen", a distinction also given to Imelda Papin, Eva Eugenio and Didith Reyes.

Dela Fuente came out of retirement in 2006 after she became a widow. In 2008, she collaborated with Richard Carpenter for her international album Something in Your Eyes where she sang a cover of the song of the same name.

== Business career ==
Dela Fuente retired from the entertainment industry in her mid-20s. In 1993, she established King of Kings Transport which was a failed venture. In 1997, she helped set up the family-owned bus transport company Philippine Corinthian Liner. In 2000, dela Fuente was elected as president of the Integrated Metro Bus Operators Association.

Dela Fuente led a transport strike in 2003 to oppose the imposition of the number coding scheme in Metro Manila for public utility vehicles.

In 2011, the franchises of 129 units of the Philippine Corinthian Liner were cancelled.

She also established a grill and seafood restaurant chain in Pasay. She partnered with a Davao City-based Thai chef to set up Asian Noodle Co. by Chef Off in 2011.

== Death ==
Dela Fuente died on the morning of March 30, 2021, at the age of 62, due to cardiac arrest arising from complications of COVID-19. She was admitted to the Pope John Paul II Hospital and Medical Center in Las Piñas, where she had been hospitalized after testing positive for COVID-19. She had other pre-existing medical conditions like hypertension and diabetes.

== Personal life ==
Dela Fuente was married to Moises "Boy" de Guzman in 1978. She was 19 years old and de Guzman was 29 when they got married. They had two sons. De Guzman died in 2006 due to cancer.

== Discography ==
=== Albums ===
==== Studio albums ====
Title	Album details	Certification
Sayang	Released: 1978; Label: Himig Records; Formats: Cassette, LP	PARI: 2× Platinum
Mga Bulong ng Pag-ibig	Released: 1979; Label: Himig Records; Formats: Cassette, LP	
Nangingiti ang Puso Ko	Released: 1980; Label: Himig Records; Formats: Cassette, LP	PARI: Gold
Claire	Released: 1980; Label: Jive; Formats: Cassette, LP	
Ikaw ang Simula	Released: 1981; Label: Polydor; Formats: Cassette, LP	
The Christmas Album	Released: 2009; Label: Viva; Formats: CD	

==== Compilation albums ====
Title	Album details	Certification
Claire: Greatest Hits	Released: 1980; Label: Himig Records; Formats: Cassette, LP	
The Best of Claire	Released: 1989; Label: Dyna Records; Formats: Cassette, CD	PARI: 2× Platinum
Sayang	Released: 2008; Label: Dyna Music; Formats: CD, HDCD	

=== Singles ===
- "Baliw"
- "'Di Magbabago"
- "Ibulong Mo sa Hangin"
- "Ikaw ang Simula"
- "Kailangan Ko'y Ikaw"
- "Makikita Mo"
- "Marupok Ka Man"
- "Mga Bulong ng Pag-Ibig"
- "Mga Nakaw na Sandali"
- "Minsan Minsan"
- "Nakaw na Pag-Ibig"
- "Nangingiti ang Puso Ko"
- "Pag-Ibig Mo... Langit Ko"
- "Sa Dulo ng Landas"
- "Something in Your Eyes"
- "Sayang"
- "Unang Pag-Ibig"
