= Reputation (Dusty Springfield album) =

Studio album by Dusty Springfield
- Released: 25 June 1990
- Recorded: November 1988 – February 1990
- Studio: Sarm West (London); Mayfair (London); Townhouse (London); Multi-Level (Westport); Marcus (London)
- Length: 42:51
- Label: Parlophone
- Producer: Pet Shop Boys; Julian Mendelsohn; Dan Hartman; Andy Richards; Paul Staveley O'Duffy

Dusty Springfield chronology
White Heat (1982)	Reputation (1990)	A Very Fine Love (1995)

Singles from Reputation
- 1. "Nothing Has Been Proved" Released: 13 February 1989; 2. "In Private" Released: 20 November 1989; 3. "Reputation" Released: 14 May 1990; 4. "Arrested by You" Released: 12 November 1990

Professional ratings
Review scores
Source	Rating
AllMusic	3/5 stars
Smash Hits	8/10 stars

Reputation is the thirteenth studio album by the British singer Dusty Springfield, and twelfth released. Issued on the Parlophone Records label in the UK and the rest of Europe in June 1990, Reputation was not only Springfield's first studio album in eight years at the time but also her first album to be released in her native UK since 1979's Living Without Your Love. After a string of commercially overlooked albums through the late 1970s and early 1980s Reputation finally managed to resurrect Springfield's career and belatedly resulted in her being re-evaluated and recognised by both music critics and the general public as the UK's foremost 'blue-eyed soul' singer. Mainly produced by Pet Shop Boys and Julian Mendelsohn and recorded in the UK over a period of some eighteen months, Reputation became her highest charting and best-selling album in the UK since 1970's From Dusty with Love, peaking at No. 18 and selling 60,000 copies within two weeks of its release.

== Background ==
In late 1987, Springfield was beginning to look back towards the UK as a source of recording work, due in large part to her collaboration with Pet Shop Boys on their single "What Have I Done to Deserve This?". Pet Shop Boys had contacted Springfield's manager, Vicki Wickham, to ask if Springfield would perform guest vocals on the duet. Being a fan of their work, Springfield accepted the offer and the song became a massive hit all over the world, peaking at No. 2 in both the UK and the United States, which proved to be the biggest hit of her career in the US. A brand new greatest hits album, Dusty – The Silver Collection, also proved highly popular, achieving Platinum status and charting in the UK at No. 14.

This renewed Springfield's confidence in recording, as well as interest in her work from the general public, and led to another hit single "Nothing Has Been Proved", also written by Pet Shop Boys with Springfield in mind. The song was written for the movie Scandal, an account of the so-called Profumo affair of 1963, starring Joanne Whalley and John Hurt. "Nothing Has Been Proved" made the Top 20 in Britain, and led to yet another hit single, "In Private", which peaked at No. 14 on the British charts. Despite the fact that "In Private" never was commercially released in the US it managed to become a dance-floor hit in the States as well, peaking at No. 14 on Billboard's Hot Dance Club Play chart in early 1990. Both singles were included on Reputation, and Pet Shop Boys collaborated with Springfield on half the album's tracks, which made up side B of the original vinyl edition. Side A included tracks produced by the Pet Shop Boys' longtime collaborator Andy Richards, Swing Out Sister producer Paul Staveley O'Duffy and Dan Hartman. Three of these titles were also mixed by the Pet Shop Boys' co-producer Julian Mendelsohn. Critics gave Reputation very favourable reviews, saying it was a long overdue return to form for Springfield, and the album spawned two further single releases, the title track "Reputation", written by Brian Spence, and the ballad "Arrested by You", written by Rupert Hine and Jeanette Obstoj, previously recorded by Hine for the Better Off Dead soundtrack.

Dan Hartman contributed to the production of three songs from the album: "Send It to Me", "Time Waits for No One" and "Born This Way". "Time Waits for No One" was written by Hartman and Holly Knight. He also played various instruments and provided backing vocals. In a 1990 interview with Springfield, she revealed, "Certainly the record company wanted to keep it as much in this country as possible. They finally relented on Dan Hartman, but basically they wanted it to be as British as possible." The three songs were produced at Hartman's own Multi-Level Studios, located within his riverside home in Connecticut. Both Springfield and her close friend Helene Sellery stayed at his home during the sessions, which were reported to be slower than anticipated as Hartman was as fussy as Springfield about her vocals, and stopped and started her over and over again.

== Release ==
The Reputation album was, in late 1990, followed by the video collection Reputation – The Videos, released on VHS in the UK and Europe by EMI's subsidiary Picture Music International, including the promo videos for "Nothing Has Been Proved", "In Private", "Reputation", "Arrested by You", interviews with Springfield, as well as a fifth animated promo video for the album track "I Want to Stay Here".

The Reputation album was first released in the US in 1997, then under the title Reputation and Rarities and expanded with additional tracks. This version of the album is also sold digitally from Parlophone Records and is the only variant of the album currently available in digital distribution.

A three-disc expanded deluxe collector's edition of Reputation was released in August 2016 on Strike Force Entertainment, a division of Cherry Red Records. The set includes the original album, extended versions, remixes, B-sides, outtakes, and Reputation - The Videos on a DVD.

== Track listing ==
Reputation track listing
No.	Title	Writer(s)	Producer(s)	Length
1.	"Reputation"	Brian Spence	Andy Richards	4:14
2.	"Send It to Me"	Allee Willis; Lauren Wood	Dan Hartman	3:57
3.	"Arrested by You"	Rupert Hine; Jeanette Obstoj	Paul Staveley O'Duffy	4:11
4.	"Time Waits for No One"	Holly Knight; Hartman	Hartman	3:06
5.	"Born This Way"	Geoffrey Williams; Simon Stirling	Hartman	3:50
6.	"In Private"	Neil Tennant; Chris Lowe	Tennant; Lowe; Julian Mendelsohn	4:22
7.	"Daydreaming"	Tennant; Lowe	Tennant; Lowe; Mendelsohn	4:57
8.	"Nothing Has Been Proved"	Tennant; Lowe	Tennant; Lowe; Mendelsohn	4:42
9.	"I Want to Stay Here"	Gerry Goffin; Carole King	Tennant; Lowe; Mendelsohn	2:49
10.	"Occupy Your Mind"	Tennant; Lowe	Tennant; Lowe; Mendelsohn	6:49

== Personnel ==
Musicians

- Simon Bell – backing vocals (1, 4)
- Andy Caine – backing vocals (1)
- Brian Spence – backing vocals (1)
- Lance Ellington – backing vocals (1)
- Andy Richards – keyboards (1)
- Dan Hartman – all non-sax instruments (2), all instruments (4), programming (4), backing vocals (4), additional overdubs and vocals (5)
- Crispin Cioe – saxophone solo (2)
- Claudia Fontaine – backing vocals (3)
- Paul Staveley O'Duffy – drum programming (3)
- Phil Palmer – guitar (3)
- Jean de Aguir – keyboards (3)
- Will Mowat – keyboards (3)
- Luís Jardim – percussion (3)
- Snake Davis – tenor saxophone (3), alto saxophone (3)
- Sylvia Mason-James – backing vocals (4)
- Geoffrey Williams – programming (5), vocal harmonies (5)
- Fonzi Thornton – backing vocals (5)
- Tawatha Agee – backing vocals (5)
- Vaneese Thomas – backing vocals (5)
- Jingles – bass guitar (5)
- Michael Graves – organ (5)
- Simon Stirling – programming (5)
- Carol Kenyon – backing vocals (6)
- Katie Kissoon – backing vocals (6)
- Gary Maughan – Fairlight programming (6, 8), keyboard programming (6)
- Jay Henry – vocals (7)
- Neil Tennant – vocals (8)
- Courtney Pine – saxophone (8)
- Tessa Niles – backing vocals (9)
- Dominic Clarke - programming (7, 9, 10)

Technical

- Andy Richards – producer (1)
- Peter Jones – engineer (1), mixing (1)
- Paul Wright – assistant engineer (1), engineer (8)
- Michael Ade – mixing assistant (1)
- Richard Arnold – mixing assistant (1–2)
- Steve Fitzmaurice – mix assistant (1)
- Dan Hartman – producer (2, 4–5), arranger (4), mixing (4)
- Rico Conning – engineer (2, 4)
- Jeremy Wheatley – assistant engineer (2)
- Tom Lord-Alge – mixing (2)
- Paul Staveley O'Duffy – producer (3), engineer (3)
- Holly Knight – arranger (4)
- Geoffrey Williams – arranger (5)
- Simon Stirling – arranger (5)
- Tim Hunt – engineer (5)
- Dave Ogrin – mixing (5)
- Pet Shop Boys – producers (6–10)
- Julian Mendelsohn – producer (6–10), engineer (6), mixing (2–4)
- Danton Supple – assistant engineer (6–7)
- Ren Swan – engineer (7)
- Angelo Badalamenti – orchestral arranger (8), orchestral conductor (8)
- Dave Eden – assistant engineer (8)
- David Jacobs – assistant engineer (10)

== Chart performance ==
=== Album ===
Chart performance for Reputation
Chart (1990)	Peak position
Australian Albums Chart	144
Dutch Albums (Album Top 100)	59
German Albums (Offizielle Top 100)	21
Swedish Albums (Sverigetopplistan)	28
UK Albums Chart	18

=== Singles ===
Chart performance for singles from Reputation
Title	Year	Peak chart positions		
Title	Year	UK	AUS	GER
"Nothing Has Been Proved"	1989	16	145	52
"In Private"	1989	14	136	4
"Reputation"	1990	38	164	28
"Arrested by You"	1990	70	—	—

- Official promo singles for "Born this Way" and "Daydreaming" were released to radio and clubs.

== Certifications ==
Certifications for Reputation
Region	Certification	Certified units/sales
United Kingdom (BPI)	Silver	60,000^{^}
^{^} Shipments figures based on certification alone.

== Bibliography ==
- Howes, Paul (2001). The Complete Dusty Springfield. London: Reynolds & Hearn Ltd. ISBN 1-903111-24-2
- O'Brien, Lucy (1988, 2000): Dusty. London: Pan Books Ltd. ISBN 978-0-330-39343-0
