= Dusty – The Silver Collection =

Greatest hits album by Dusty Springfield
- Released: 1988

Dusty Springfield chronology
White Heat (1982)	Dusty – The Silver Collection (1988)	Reputation (1990)

Dusty – The Silver Collection is a greatest hits album by English singer Dusty Springfield, released in 1988 by Philips Records. It contains 24 selected tracks recorded between 1963 and 1970, including all of Springfield's top 10 singles from that period.

== Promotion ==
Before the compilation's release, Springfield's 1963 debut single, "I Only Want to Be with You", which originally reached number four in the UK singles chart, was re-released. The song had recently been used in a Britvic 55 soft drinks advertisement in the UK, in which Springfield appeared in person. It reached number 83 in the UK singles chart in January 1988.

== Critical reception ==
Professional ratings
Review scores
Source	Rating
AllMusic	4/5 stars

In a retrospective review for AllMusic, Thom Jurek described the compilation as "perhaps the most telling portrait yet of the late Ms. Springfield's diversity as a pop singer and the enduring popularity of her classic vocal style", though he noted that "[t]he recordings here are not grouped chronologically, giving the set a kind of untrackable feel, but on repeated listening, making perfect sense."

== Track listing ==
No.	Title	Writer(s)	Length
1.	"I Only Want to Be with You"	Mike Hawker; Ivor Raymonde	2:36
2.	"Stay Awhile"	Hawker; Raymonde	1:56
3.	"I Just Don't Know What to Do with Myself"	Burt Bacharach; Hal David	3:02
4.	"Wishin' and Hopin'"	Bacharach; David	2:53
5.	"Losing You"	Clive Westlake; Tom Springfield	3:01
6.	"Give Me Time"	Amedeo Tommasi; Pietro Melfa; Peter Callander	3:06
7.	"24 Hours from Tulsa"	Bacharach; David	3:02
8.	"If You Go Away"	Jacques Brel; Rod McKuen	3:52
9.	"Just One Smile"	Randy Newman	2:39
10.	"Son of a Preacher Man"	John Hurley; Ronnie Wilkins	2:26
11.	"All I See Is You"	Westlake; Ben Weisman	3:22
12.	"You Don't Have to Say You Love Me"	Pino Donaggio; Vicki Wickham; Simon Napier-Bell	2:48
13.	"I Close My Eyes and Count to Ten"	Westlake	3:11
14.	"Some of Your Lovin'"	Gerry Goffin; Carole King	3:03
15.	"In the Middle of Nowhere"	Bea Verdi; Buddy Kaye	2:50
16.	"Little by Little"	Verdi; Kaye; Eddie Gin	2:24
17.	"How Can I Be Sure"	Felix Cavaliere; Eddie Brigati	2:46
18.	"The Look of Love"	Bacharach; David	3:31
19.	"My Colouring Book"	John Kander; Fred Ebb	3:02
20.	"A Brand New Me"	Kenneth Gamble; Thom Bell; Jerry Butler	2:27
21.	"I'll Try Anything"	Mark Barkan; Vic Millrose	2:30
22.	"Anyone Who Had a Heart"	Bacharach; David	2:55
23.	"Am I the Same Girl"	Eugene Record; Sonny Sanders	3:01
24.	"Goin' Back"	Goffin; King	3:32

== Charts ==
Chart performance for Dusty – The Silver Collection
Chart (1988)	Peak position
UK Albums (OCC)	14

== Certifications ==
Region	Certification	Certified units/sales
United Kingdom (BPI)	Gold	100,000^{^}
^{^} Shipments figures based on certification alone.
