= Vehicle registration plates of the Philippines =

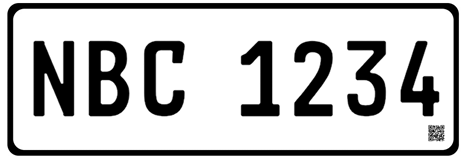
- Country: Philippines

Current series
- Name: New Plate Number Series
- Size: 390 mm × 140 mm (15.4 in × 5.5 in) for motor vehicles 235 mm × 135 mm (9.3 in × 5.3 in) for motorcycles and tricycles
- Material: Aluminum
- Serial format: ABC 1234 (motor vehicles); 123ABC (Note: Originally limited to the format 123ABC, but later expanded to include 1ABC23, 12AB3C, AB1C23, 1A2BC3, A1B2C3, A12B3C, 1AB23C, A1B23C, AB12C3, 1AB2C3, A12BC3, A1B234, 1A2B3C, A12B34, A123B4, 12ABC3, and A1BC23, among virtually any six-character alphanumeric combination.) (motorcycles and tricycles)
- Front plate: Required (except motorcycles and tricycles)
- Rear plate: Required
- Colour (front): List: Black on white (private); Red on white (government); Green on white (electric/hybrid); Blue on white (diplomatic); Black on yellow (PUVs)
- Colour (rear): Same as front
- Introduced: May 8, 2014 (12 years ago) (Note: The current design was standardized in 2023)
- Designer: Land Transportation Office (LTO)

Availability
- Issued by: Land Transportation Office (LTO)
- Manufactured by: Trojan Computer Forms Manufacturing Corp. and J.H. Tönnjes E.A.S.T. GmbH & Co. KG Joint Venture at the Plate Manufacturing Facility, LTO Central Office, East Avenue, Quezon City

History
- First issued: 1912

Vehicle registration plates in the Philippines, commonly known as license plates (Filipino: plaka), are issued and regulated by the Land Transportation Office (LTO), a government agency under the Department of Transportation (DOTr).

== History ==
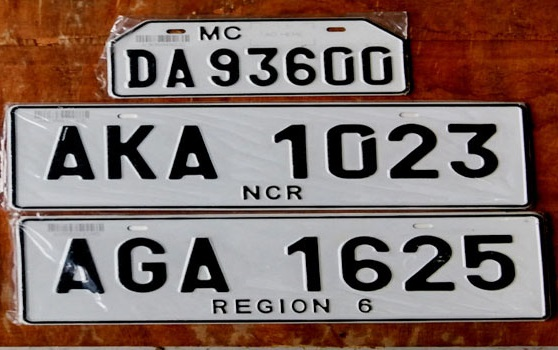
The then-new license plate designs first issued in 2014

In 2016, the LTO began issuing "virtual plates" as a temporary measure to address the backlog of physical license plates. New vehicles were given a virtual identifier consisting of a combination of alphanumeric symbols, which facilitated the release of permanent plates once they became available. In August 2017, the Department of Transportation (DOTr) selected the winning bidder under the government's "Moving Forward Program" to address the backlog of 3.4 million plates covering July 2016 to December 2017.

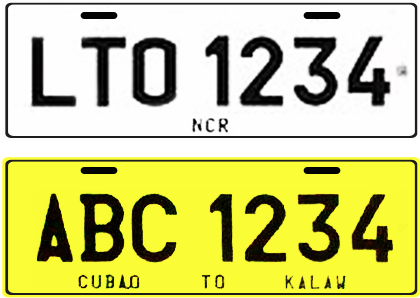
Proposed design for automobile license plates in 2013

In January 2018, the Supreme Court of the Philippines ordered the release of license plates that had been held due to restraining orders affecting the modernization program. Full-scale distribution of the new plates was expected by mid-February 2018. The LTO received the plate-making machines that month and installed them in a new production facility. The new plates were released nationwide beginning in July 2018. Under this series, the first letter of the license plate indicates the place of registration, following the same designation system used in the 1981 series.

== Current plate design specifications ==
Under the current system, plates for four-wheeled vehicles follow the format ABC 1234 (three letters followed by four digits). Motorcycle plates initially used the format 123 ABC, but as these combinations were exhausted, the LTO introduced new formats such as A 123 BC, AB 123 C, 1 ABC 23, A 1234 C, A 1C 234, and A 12C 34. (Note: Spaces are shown here for readability; actual motorcycle plates display the characters without separators.) It is unclear whether this expansion of formats was part of the agency's original plan or a response to an unexpectedly rapid depletion of available combinations. In all cases, the first letter, regardless of its position, indicates the region where the motorcycle was registered. The LTO has not stated that the current set of formats is final, and additional combinations may be introduced as needed.

The replacement plates registered in the National Capital Region with two letters followed by four digits (and vice-versa) may be also required by the LTO for motorcycle plates, replacing the older white-green plates with white-black plates (e.g. 1234 AB and AB 1234). Also, this action is to address the backlog plates of motorcycle riders in several regional offices nationwide. However, for motorcycle owners who have registered their plates with the format of two letters followed by five digits (e.g. AB 12345) between 2014 and 2016, the newer system shall be generated by the office.

=== Plate number dimensions and typefaces ===
The current license plates for four-wheeled vehicles measure 390 mm wide and 140 mm high, while motorcycle plates released since 2020 measure 235 mm wide and 135 mm high. The characters are stamped on an aluminum plate and coated with reflective paint. In 2018, the Land Transportation Office adopted FE-Schrift as the official typeface for license plates because its characters are designed to be difficult to alter. Plates issued since 2018 no longer display a separate region code (as that can be already inferred from the first two characters of plate number, and for diplomatic vehicles above 1000 the first three for the entity it was assigned to).

Before 1981, the Philippines used the North American standard measuring 300 mm × 150 mm (11.8 in × 5.9 in) for cars and trucks.

=== Registration area prefixes ===
When the revised plate design was introduced in 2018, virtual and temporary plates issued from July 2016 to December 2017 under the 2014 series were updated to use the new alphabetical designation.

This reintroduced the scheme used prior to the 2014 series, in which the first letter of the plate number indicates the region where the vehicle was initially registered, with slight modifications and reallocation of certain codes to accommodate newer regions and those requiring additional allocations. For example, the former Southern Tagalog region (Region IV), which was later split into Calabarzon (Region IV-A) and Mimaropa (Region IV-B) in 2002, retained its legacy codes, with Calabarzon using D and Mimaropa using V. The Cordillera Administrative Region and Caraga each received distinct codes, Y (formerly used in Central Visayas) and Z (formerly used in Metro Manila), respectively.

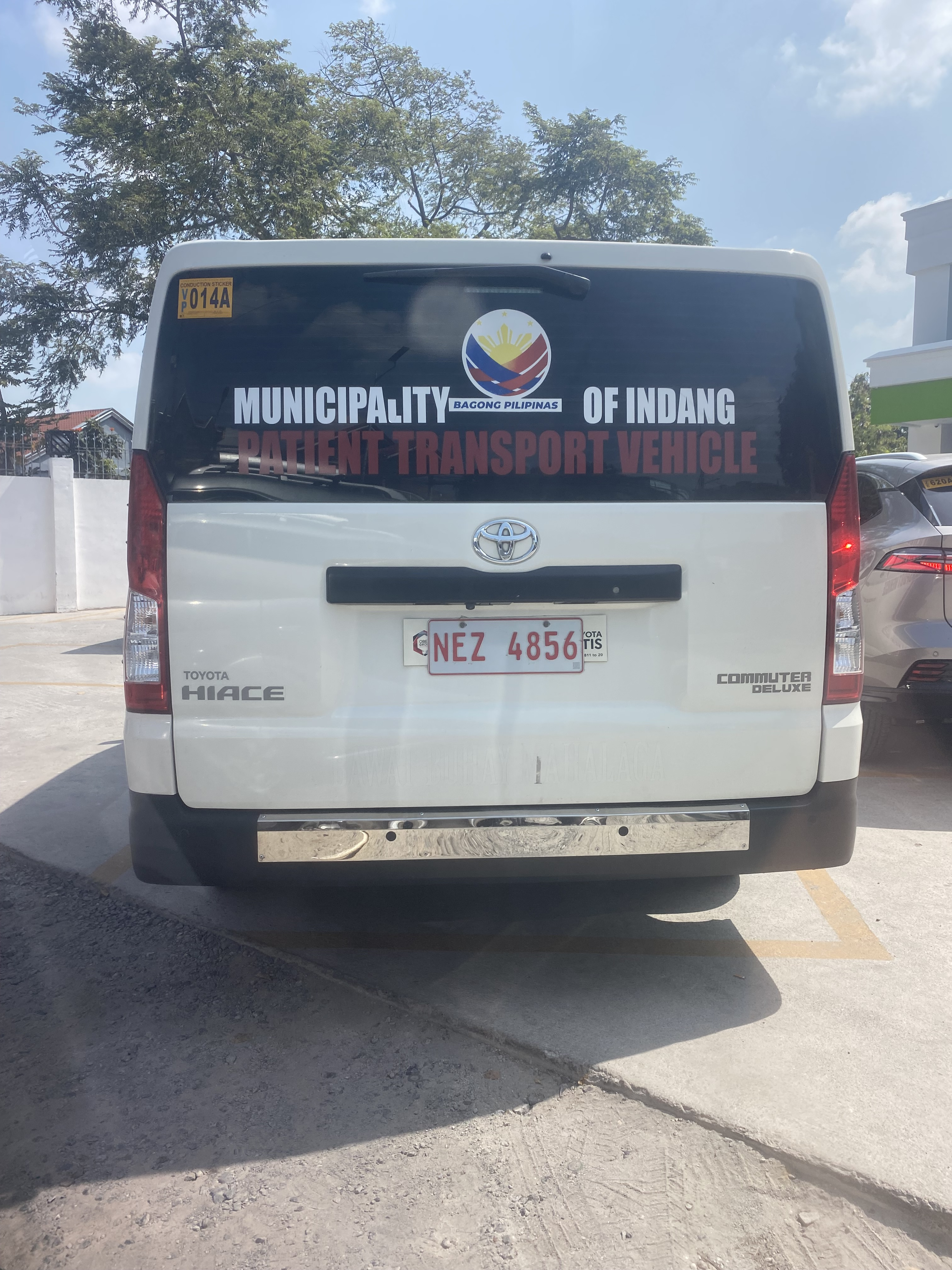
A government-owned patient transport vehicle with a red license plate beginning with N

The letter S is reserved (Note: Optional Motor Vehicle Special Plates (OMVSP) are an exception, as S may be used as an initial letter.) for government-owned vehicles, including those owned by government-owned and controlled corporations (GOCCs). In cases where a government vehicle was donated, acquired from private entities, or previously registered to private individuals, its plate may not begin with S despite being marked in red. In some cases, the vehicle may also retain its private plate.

Motor vehicle and motorcycle license plate number prefixes since 2018 (Note: Standardized in 2023 under the Uniform Policy on License Plate Series)
Prefix	Region
A	Ilocos Region (Note: Currently used for motorcycles only)
B	Cagayan Valley
C	Central Luzon
D	Calabarzon
E	Bicol Region
F	Western Visayas (Note: The Negros Island Region has no distinct license plate prefix designation. Vehicles registered in its provinces continue to use the plate designations assigned to Western Visayas (for Negros Occidental) and Central Visayas (for Negros Oriental and Siquijor) prior to the reestablishment of the region in 2024.)
G	Central Visayas
H	Eastern Visayas
I	Ilocos Region
J	Zamboanga Peninsula (Note: Also de facto used in Bangsamoro)
K	Northern Mindanao
L	Davao Region
M	Soccsksargen
N	Metro Manila
O	Calabarzon
P	Metro Manila
Q	Metro Manila
R	Central Luzon
S	None (Note: Reserved for government-owned vehicles)
T	Metro Manila
U	Metro Manila
V	Mimaropa
W	Central Luzon
X	Metro Manila
Y	Cordillera
Z	Caraga

=== Vehicle classification by color scheme ===
Pattern	Color	Class	Description	Image
NBC 1234 123NBC N123BC NB123C N1234C	Black text on white background	Internal combustion engine vehicles	Private internal combustion engine vehicles, generally not for commercial use. However, public utility vehicles and some government vehicles also use this plate design.	
NBV 1234 123NVB N123VB NV123B	Green text on white background	Electric vehicles and other variants (e.g hybrid, battery and plug-in hybrids)	Private electric or hybrid vehicles, not for commercial use. However, some public utility vehicles also use this plate design.	
NBC 1234 123NBC N123BC NB123C	Black text on yellow background	Public utility vehicles	Public utility vehicles and other for-hire vehicles (e.g. commercial trucks, public transport buses, taxis, tricycles and jeepneys.)	
SNA 1234 123SNA S123NA	Red text on white background	Government vehicles	Vehicles for official government use (e.g.: government-owned cars, police cars, ambulances, and fire trucks).	
001 1234	Blue text on white background	Diplomatic vehicles	Vehicles in diplomatic use: 7 digit new diplomatic license plate with blue numbers on a white background.; The first 3 digits of the plate will indicate the assigned number of the country, diplomatic missions, consular missions, and international organization.	

=== Vehicle classification by second and third letter ===
The second letter on the number plate classifies special types of vehicles, such as trailers, electric, hybrid, and vintage vehicles.

Vehicles
Classification	Position of letter assignment	Example	Color	Image
Private Trailers	Second letter is U	NUA 1234	Black text on white background	
Electric vehicle	Second letter may be from A to M Third letter may be the following: V, W, X, Y, Z	NHV 1234 NIV 5678 NJV 9012	Green text on white background	
Hybrid vehicle	Second letter may be from N to Z Third letter may be the following: V, W, X, Y, Z	JNW 4321 CRW 8765 NNV 2109	Green text on white background	
Vintage vehicle	Last two letters are the following: TX, TY, TZ	NTX 9876 BTY 5432 GTZ 1098	Black text on white background with byline. (e.g. vintage vehicle 1960)	

Motorcycles
Classification	Position of letter assignment	Example
Electric vehicle	Second letter may be from V, W, X, Y, Z Third letter may be the following: A to M	D123VB J209XK N124YM
Hybrid vehicle	Second letter may be from V, W, X, Y, Z Third letter may be the following: N to Z	N583ZZ C789WO G897VQ
Vintage vehicle	Last two letters are the following: TX, TY, TZ	P123TX N921TY K388TZ

=== Motorcycle classification by color strip and position ===
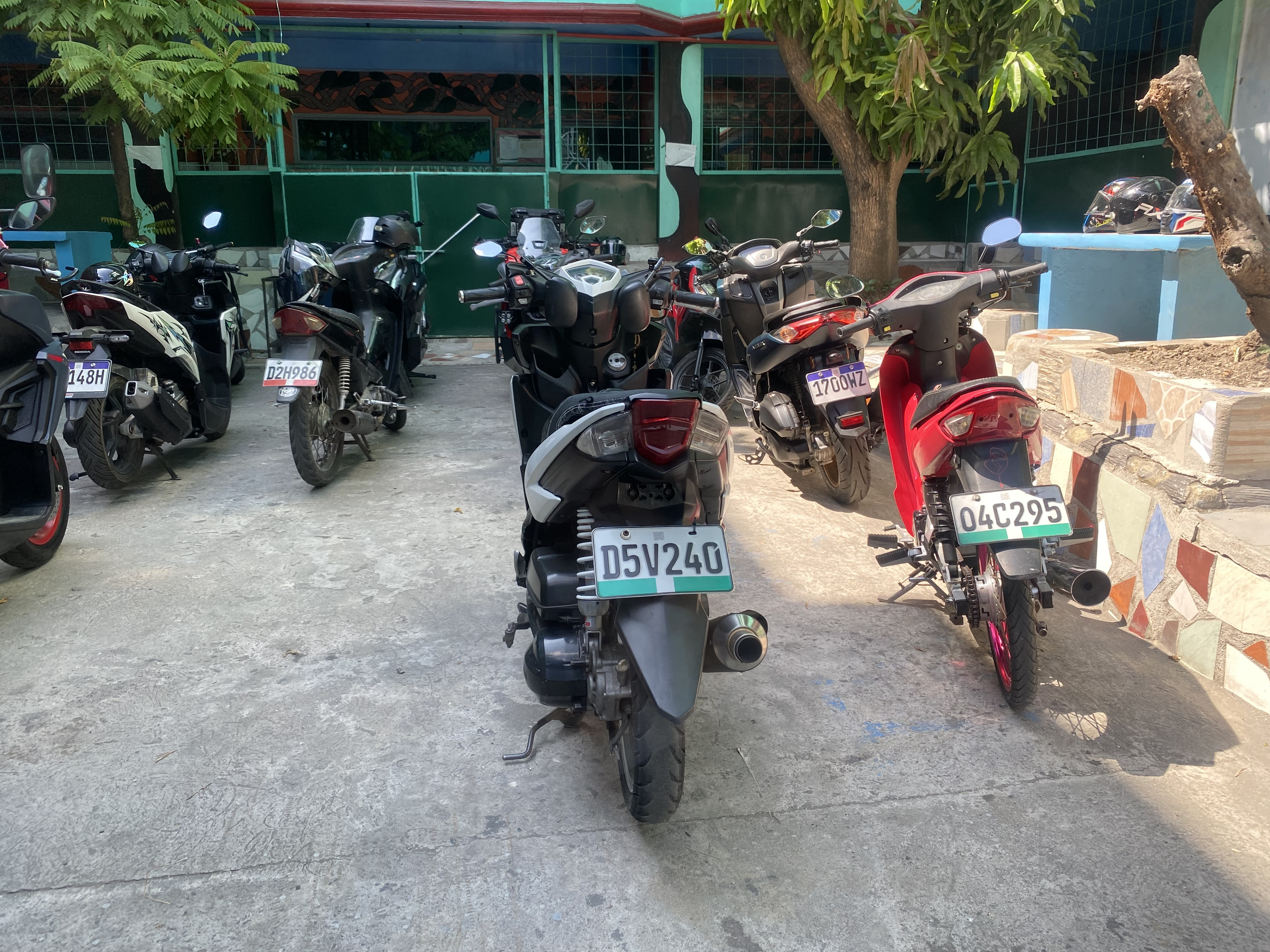
Motorcycles registered in Calabarzon, with plates bearing D or O as the leftmost initial letter, showing license plate color strip variations used in the region: purple (top, original), green (bottom, alternate), and red (bottom, alternate)

Motorcycle registration plates released since 2020 feature color-coded strips indicating the region of registration, in addition to the registration area prefix. In 2025, LTO began issuing alternate color strips in select regions to address supply allocation challenges caused by uneven regional demand and plate backlogs. The assignment of an alternate color strip may be initiated by LTO when deemed necessary, provided that the leftmost letter assigned to the region remains unchanged.

Strip color	Strip position	Region	Image
None (Note: Specified as white at the top and bottom in LTO memoranda, but no strips are present on the plate)	–	National Capital Region; Government vehicles	
Pink	Top	Cordillera Administrative Region Alternatively used by: Central Visayas	
Pink	Bottom	Caraga	
Green	Top	Ilocos Region Alternatively used by: Central Luzon	
Green	Bottom	Eastern Visayas Alternatively used by: Calabarzon, Western Visayas, Davao Region	
Gray	Top	Bicol Region	
Gray	Bottom	Northern Mindanao Alternatively used by: Central Luzon	
Blue	Top	Central Luzon	
Blue	Bottom	Davao Region	
Purple	Top	Calabarzon Alternatively used by: Mimaropa, Caraga	
Purple	Bottom	Western Visayas	
Orange	Top	Mimaropa Alternatively used by: Central Luzon, Bicol Region	
Orange	Bottom	Central Visayas	
Red	Top	Cagayan Valley	
Red	Bottom	Zamboanga Peninsula Alternatively used by: Calabarzon, Western Visayas	
Brown	Bottom	Soccsksargen	

== Special plate number designs ==
=== High-ranking government plates ===
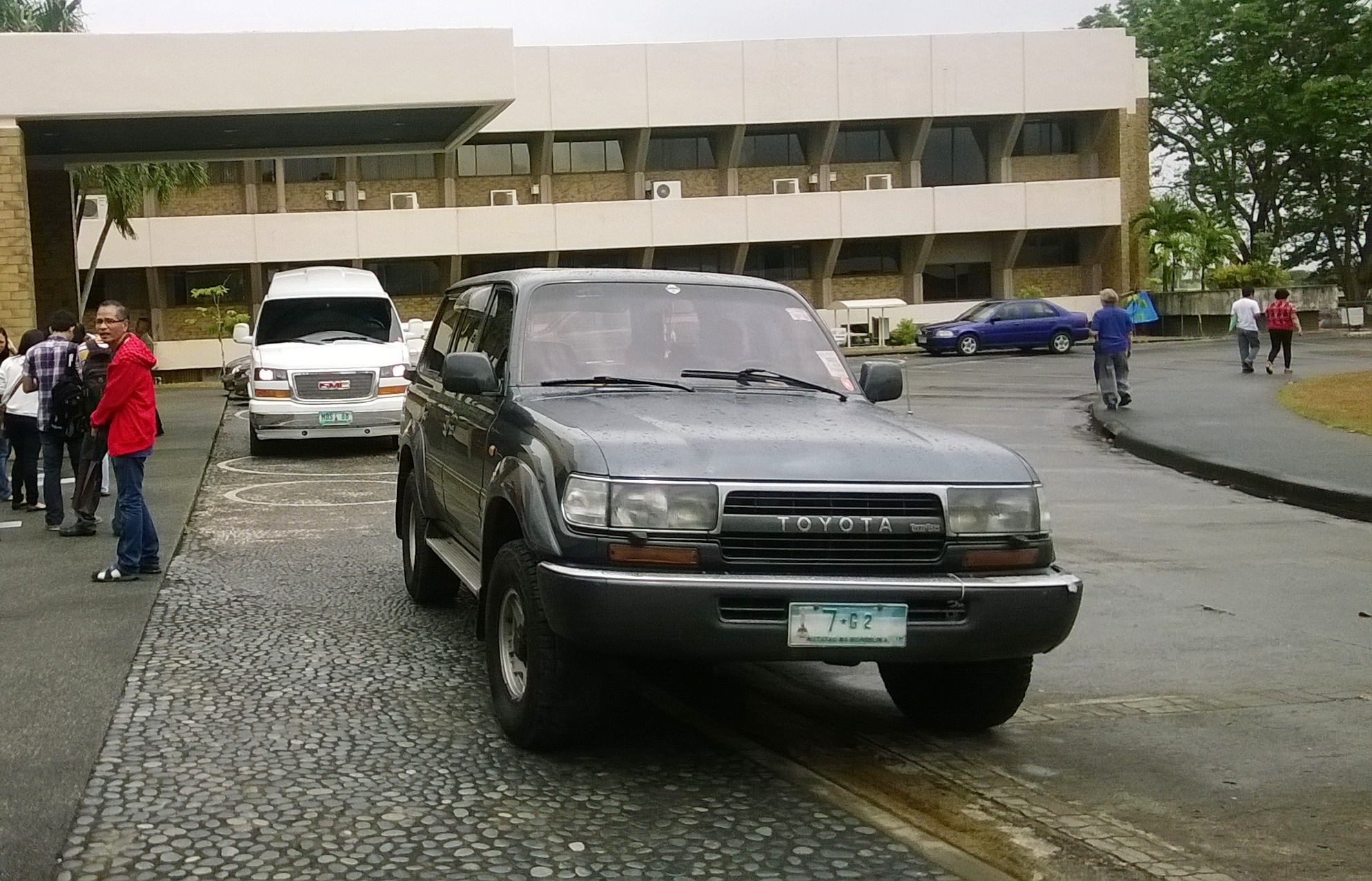
Official vehicle of the late Senator Miriam Defensor Santiago on a speaking engagement at the International Rice Research Institute on International Women's Day 2014. Behind is a GMC vehicle that has personalized plates presumed to also belong to her - bearing her initials and an allusion to the number 8 being lucky in Chinese numerology.

Known officially as low-numbered (protocol) license plates, these are reserved for the highest-ranking government officials of the Philippines and share the same paint scheme as plates issued to private vehicles.

List of low-numbered plates and corresponding officials
Plate	Officials
1	President of the Philippines
2	Vice-President of the Philippines
3	Senate President of the Philippines
4	Speaker of the Philippine House of Representatives
5	Chief Justice of the Philippine Supreme Court
6	Cabinet Secretaries
7	Senators
8	Representatives
9	Associate Justices of the Philippine Supreme Court
10	Presiding Justices of the Court of Appeals, Court of Tax Appeals, Sandiganbayan, and the Solicitor General
11	Chairpersons of Constitutional Commissions and the Ombudsman
14	Chief of Staff of the Armed Forces of the Philippines and Chief of the Philippine National Police

Until 2024, plate 16 was assigned to Regional Trial Court justices, while plate 17 was issued to first-level courts, including Metropolitan Trial Courts, Municipal Trial Courts, Municipal Trial Courts in Cities, and the Sharia Circuit Court, for use by assistant city prosecutors, district prosecutors, and chief city prosecutors.

Associate justices of the Court of Appeals, Court of Tax Appeals, and Sandiganbayan may also be authorized to use protocol plates upon the recommendation of the LTO and the approval of the Department of Transportation (DOTr).

=== Diplomatic plates ===
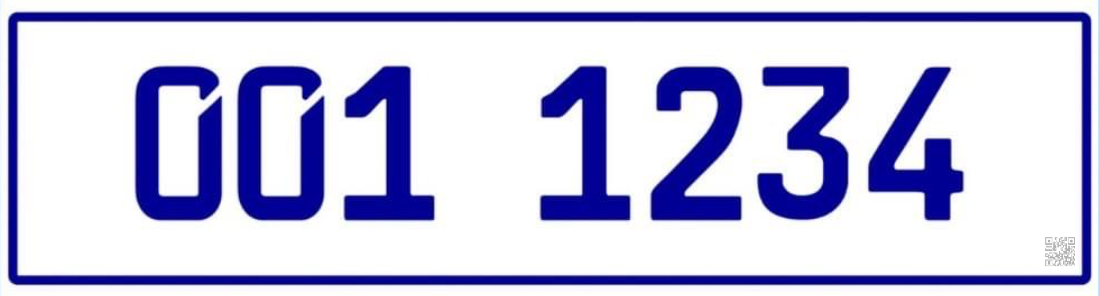
The current diplomatic license plate design, introduced in 2022.

The new diplomatic license plates consist of seven numeric characters in blue on a white background. These plates are issued to foreign diplomats, members of diplomatic missions, and international organizations based in the Philippines. In October 2022, the LTO and Department of Foreign Affairs (DFA) launched the new plates, replacing the older designs. The previous diplomatic and other exempted vehicle (OEV) plates remained valid until September 2023.

The first three digits of the plate indicate the country or organization code, assigned based on the establishment of diplomatic relations. For example, 003 0045 is assigned to Australia. The remaining four digits are motor vehicle serial registration numbers assigned by the LTO and the DFA, with 1000 always reserved for ambassadors.

List of country codes for diplomatic plates
Number	Country	Number	Country	Number	Country	Number	Country
001	Vatican City/Holy See	021	Turkey	041	Iran	061	Libya
002	Egypt	022	Thailand	042	European Union	062	Oman
003	Australia	023	Pakistan	043	Malaysia	063	Qatar
004	Belgium	024	India	044	New Zealand	064	Brunei
005	Brazil	025	Canada	045	Venezuela	065	Sovereign Military Order of Malta
006	Chile	026	Indonesia	046	Singapore	066	Palestine
007	Panama	027	Greece	047	Saudi Arabia	067	Palau
008	United Kingdom	028	Netherlands	048	Bangladesh	068	Angola
009	United States	029	Mexico	049	Romania	069	Timor-Leste
010	Colombia	030	Germany	050	Poland	070	Bahrain
011	Ireland	031	Laos	051	Hungary	071	Yemen
012	Denmark	032	Finland	052	Czech Republic	072	Ukraine
013	Austria	033	Japan	053	United Arab Emirates	073	Lebanon
014	Sweden	034	Switzerland	054	Iraq	074	Jordan
015	France	035	Myanmar	055	Morocco	075	Kazakhstan
016	Italy	036	Israel	056	China		
017	Spain	037	Cambodia	057	Papua New Guinea		
018	Norway	038	Sri Lanka	058	Russia		
019	Argentina	039	Nigeria	059	Vietnam		
020	South Korea	040	South Africa	060	Kuwait		

List of international organization codes
Number	Organization	Number	Organization	Number	Organization
200	Taipei Economic and Cultural Office in the Philippines	210	United Nations Information Centres	220	United Nations Population Fund
201	United Nations	211	United Nations Development Programme	221	International Organization for Migration
202	UNICEF	212	Food and Agriculture Organization	222	ASEAN Centre for Biodiversity
203	World Health Organization	213	International Monetary Fund	223	International Rice Research Institute
204	United Nations Industrial Development Organization	214	United Nations High Commissioner for Refugees	224	Japan Bank for International Cooperation
205	Asian Development Bank	215	International Committee of the Red Cross	225	Swedish International Development Cooperation Agency
206	World Trade Organization	216	International Finance Corporation	300	–
207	World Food Programme	217	World Bank		
208	International Labour Organization	218	Canadian International Development Agency		
209	United States Agency for International Development	219	Japan International Cooperation Agency		

=== Former head of state ===
Vehicles of former presidents bear the number 100 in blue characters.

=== Personalized plates ===
Motorists may apply for personalized plates under the Optional Motor Vehicle Special Plate (OMVSP) program, subject to the following conditions:

1. The combination must be unique, i.e., no duplicate plate is registered anywhere in the Philippines.
2. The combination must not duplicate government protocol plates.
3. The motorist must pay a minimum fee of ₱5,000, depending on the chosen combination.
4. OMVSP plates are only available for private cars, SUVs, AUVs, sports pick-ups, and commuter vans.

OMVSP plate formats and fees
Combination	Fee	Image
Three-letter, two-number plates (except 00) (No longer issued as of 2024)	₱25,000	
Three-letter, three-number plates (except 000) (No longer issued as of 2024)	₱15,000	
Three-letter, four-number plates (except 0000)	₱35,000	

== Temporary plate numbers ==
=== Conduction stickers ===
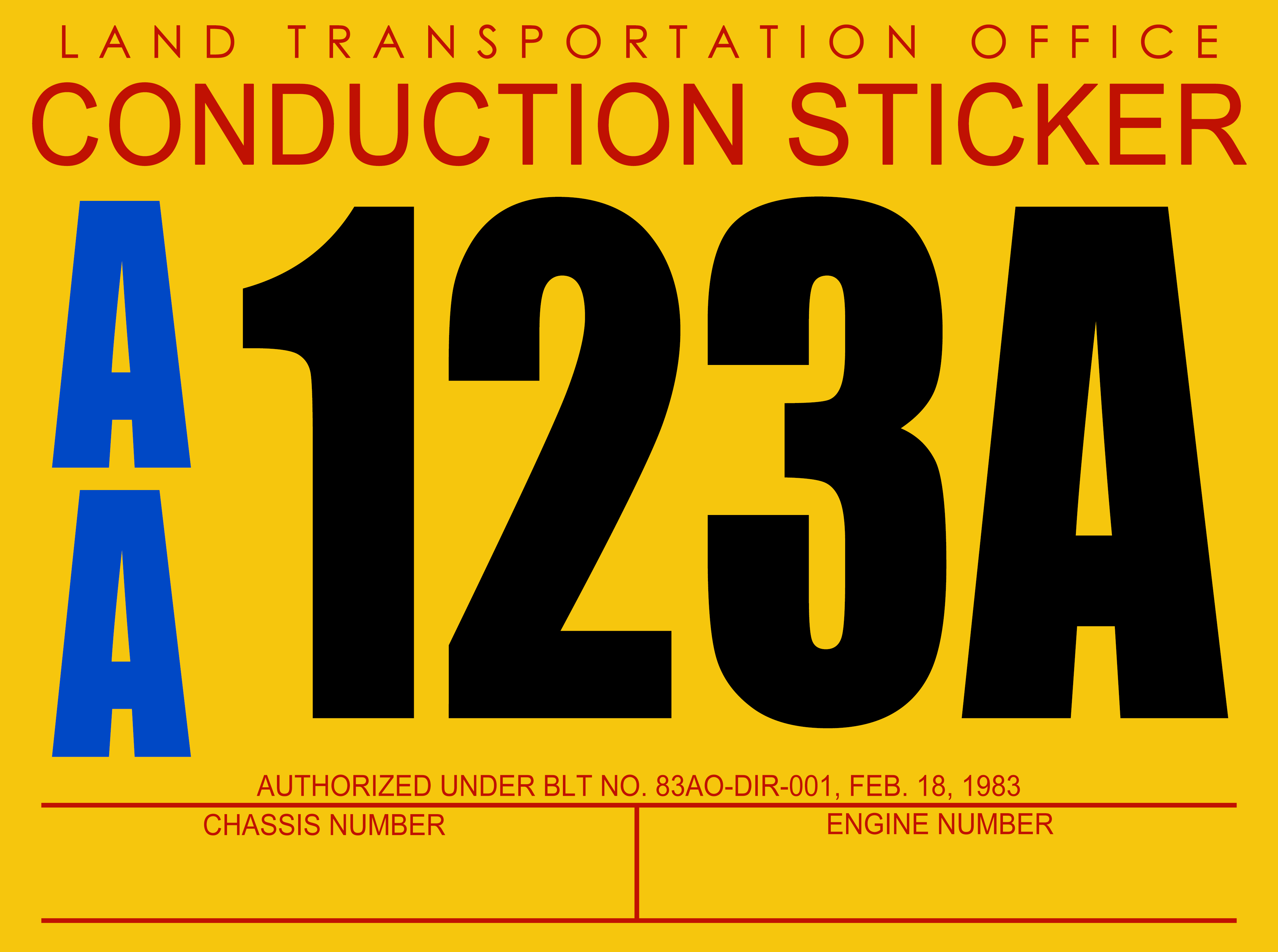
An example of a conduction sticker

Conduction stickers are temporary identifiers issued to vehicles in lieu of license plates while the official plates are still in production. The system was implemented in 1983 and first used in 1984. Several formats with different letter–number arrangements have been produced over time.

Years	Conduction sticker format	Examples	Background color
1984–1994	ABC 12	SUX35; HRK72	White (1984–1993); Yellow (1993–1994)
1994–2003	12 ABC	30XNK; 22SRW	Red
2003–2018	AB 1234	BV8032 (Mitsubishi); OX5192 (Nissan); VJ2637 (Toyota)	White (2003–2012); Yellow (2012–2018)
2017–2023	A1 B234	Y1L350 (Mitsubishi); F6A350 (Nissan); P8S467 (Toyota)	Yellow
2023–2026	AB 123 C	GD776A; DP705B	Yellow
2026–present	AB 123	BI981; AN283	Yellow

=== Motor vehicle file number ===
Each vehicle is assigned a 15-digit motor vehicle (MV) file number that reflects the location where it was first registered (e.g., 1301-00000012345 for vehicles registered in Metro Manila). These numbers are sometimes used as temporary plate numbers, particularly for public utility vehicles (PUVs).

Region	MV file number	Temporary plate number (PUVs)
Metro Manila	13**-*********** 18**-***********	13****; 18****
Cordillera Administrative Region	14**-***********	14****
Ilocos Region	01**-***********	01****
Cagayan Valley	02**-***********	02****
Central Luzon	03**-***********	03****
Calabarzon and Mimaropa	04**-***********	04****
Bicol Region	05**-***********	05****
Western Visayas, Negros Occidental	06**-***********	06****
Central Visayas, Negros Oriental, Siquijor	07**-***********	07****
Eastern Visayas	08**-***********	08****
Zamboanga Peninsula	09**-***********	09****
Northern Mindanao	10**-***********	10****
Davao Region	11**-***********	11****
Soccsksargen	12**-***********	12****
Caraga	15**-***********	15****
Bangsamoro	17**-***********	17****

=== LTO-authorized six-digit temporary plate number ===
To address the extensive backlog in license plate production between 2016 and 2019, the LTO introduced a six-digit temporary plate number system. These numbers are based on the LTO agency code (indicating the region where the vehicle was registered) and the month of registration (e.g. 130108 for Metro Manila, 040103 for Calabarzon). This system became the most common form of temporary identification during this period.

Public utility vehicles (including buses, jeepneys, and UV Express vans) registered from July 1, 2016, onward have used white private plates, MV file numbers, or six-digit temporary plate numbers while waiting for the release of permanent yellow plates.

Government vehicles registered from 2020 onward were also initially issued white private plates. In November 2021, the LTO began releasing new red plates for government vehicles registered from 2016 to 2019. In 2024, a new series of red plates was introduced, with the second letter indicating the region of registration (e.g. SNA for Metro Manila, SDA for Calabarzon).

In 2023, the LTO released green plates for hybrid and electric vehicles, as well as white plates with identifying marks for vintage vehicles. Trailer plates were introduced in 2025 for trailers registered from 2016 onward.

== Former plate number designs still in use ==
=== 2014 series ===
==== Plate number design ====
The 2014 design, introduced in 2014, used the numbering format ABC 1234 for automobiles and AB 12345 for motorcycles. In this design, the region where the vehicle was registered was printed at the bottom of the plate, eliminating the need for registration area prefixes (except for motorcycles).

The new plate format series and design was originally scheduled for release in September or October 2013, but its release was delayed several times primarily due to concerns about funding for the license plate project and the increasing number of vehicles using temporary plates bearing the conduction sticker number. The first batch of plates was eventually issued in May 2014. By January 2015, vehicle owners using 1981 series plates were required to pay ₱450 to replace them with the modern series plates.

In 2018, the LTO introduced an updated plate design that retained the same serial format but featured a new layout, the use of the FE-Schrift typeface, and the removal of the printed region code for automobiles. Production and issuance of plates with the 2018 design continues as of 2025, alongside efforts to clear the plate backlog. In 2025, the LTO also began replacing the AB 12345 (seven-character) motorcycle plates with a six-character format to comply with the Motorcycle Crime Prevention Act.

==== Vehicle classification by color scheme ====
⁣⁣⁣Pattern⁣	Color	Class	Description	⁣Image
ABC 1234 AB 12345⁣	Black text on white background	Private Vehicles	Private vehicles, typically not for commercial use. However, for years on and as of December 2025, it is quite common to see properly-licensed delivery four-wheeled and up vehicles, for-hire motorcycles such as Angkas and regular tricycles with this kind of plate.	
ABC 1234 AB 12345⁣	Black text on yellow background	Public utility vehicles	Public utility vehicles and other for-hire vehicles (e.g. commercial trucks, public transport buses, taxis and jeepneys)	
SBC 1234 SA 12345⁣	Red text on white background	Government vehicles	Vehicles for official government use (e.g. police cars, ambulances, and fire trucks)	
⁣0000 ⁣00000⁣⁣ ⁣ ⁣ ⁣⁣ ⁣ ⁣ ⁣ ⁣	Blue text on white background	Diplomatic vehicles	Vehicles in diplomatic use: 4 digit diplomatic license plates with blue numbers on a white background are for members of the Diplomatic Corps (DC); 5 digit diplomatic license plates with black numbers on a blue background are for general use (termed "Other Exempt Vehicles" (OEV) by the government) of Embassies, Consulates & International Non-government Organizations (INGOs).	

=== 1981 series ===
==== Plate number design ====
Digital rendition of a Public utility vehicle (PUV) license plate CWM-148 w/ 2013 validation sticker

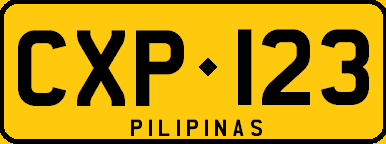
Digital rendition of a plate CXP-123 on a PUV with its typeface Charles Wright and PILIPINAS byline, made out of plastic

The font used in this series was never released electronically to the public. The base was Charles Wright font with influences from the letterforms of New South Wales vehicle registration plates. The 1981 series, along with its later variants, remained in production until it was discontinued and replaced by the 2014 series under the Plate Standardization Program. The letterforms are generally blocky. Although the renewal year stickers discontinued, many recent or duplicate plates don't have the latter because the sticker system has changed into electronic renewal system.

The 1981 design became the most widely used plate number design, produced from 1981 to 2014. The LTO issued the numbering format ABC 123 for automobiles and AB 1234 and 1234 AB for motorcycles. Color-coded year and classification stickers were introduced in 1982. The typeface featured a curved, bold design on the glyphs; early plates had thinner strokes and no curves. Motorcycle plates used DIN 1451 or D-DIN font. The design was based on Charles Wright (with modifications), the 1951–1980 New South Wales plates, and older Philippine plates with color coding per vehicle, with all glyphs made blocky.

Early 1981 plates were borderless and semi-bold with a diamond separator. By 1988, plates have borders and a bolder typeface. In 1994, the "PILIPINAS" slogan was replaced by "PHILIPPINES 2000" in a derivative DIN 1451 font, though 1988 plates continued to be produced into the 2000s. The 2002 "Rizal Monument" series used smaller characters and returned to a semi-bold typeface. Production of this series ended in 2014, giving way to the 2014 series plates. The 2010 yellow plates were also discontinued, though some shops continued to sell reproductions that were not exact copies. However, the 1981 series are now in limited production for duplicate plates.

In 2025, the LTO began replacing the old, smaller AB 1234 and 1234 AB motorcycle plates with a larger six-character format to comply with the Motorcycle Crime Prevention Act.

==== Update changes issued by region ====
Plates starting with W and Z that were originally issued for Metro Manila were later reassigned to Central Luzon (motorcycles with a blue strip) and Caraga (for both motorcycles and motor vehicles), respectively. The letter I was redesigned with serifs and used in the middle or end of the letter block. Plates starting with A, originally used nationwide, were later assigned to motorcycles registered in the Ilocos Region.

==== Registration area prefix ====
The first letter in the 1981 series denoted the region where the vehicle was registered. The letter S indicated a government-owned vehicle.

Prefix	Region
A	Ilocos Region and Cordillera Administrative Region
B	Cagayan Valley
C	Central Luzon
D	Calabarzon and Mimaropa
E	Bicol Region
F	Western Visayas
G	Central Visayas
H	Eastern Visayas
J	Zamboanga Peninsula and Autonomous Region in Muslim Mindanao
K	Northern Mindanao
L	Davao Region and Caraga
M	Soccsksargen
N	Metro Manila
P	Metro Manila
R	Central Luzon
T	Metro Manila
U	Metro Manila
V	Calabarzon and Mimaropa
W	Metro Manila
X	Metro Manila
Y	Central Visayas
Z	Metro Manila

The letters I and O were not used as the first letter of plates to avoid confusion with the numbers 1 and 0. By 2009, they were allowed as middle or last letters, exclusively for private vehicles. The letter Q was used in regular motorcycle plate circulation for public-use motorcycles. By 2009, it appeared as a middle or last letter on NCR plates and as a last letter on Central Visayas plates.

==== Vehicle classification by second letter ====
The second letter on the plate identified whether the vehicle was a trailer or an automobile and whether it was for private or public use. The letter U in the second position indicated a privately used trailer, while Z indicated a publicly used trailer. The letters V, W, X, and Y were used to indicate public utility vehicles. On motorcycle plates, U and Z represented private use for three-wheeled motorcycles, while V, W, X, and Y represented public use for all motorcycle types.

==== Vehicle classification by paint scheme ====
- Green on white: The most common type of plate, for privately owned vehicles. The white background was replaced by the Rizal Monument design in 2002 for automobiles.
- Black on yellow: Commercial or public utility vehicles.
- Red on white: Government-owned vehicles; the white background was replaced by the Rizal Monument design in 2002 for automobiles.
- Blue on white: Diplomatic and other exempt vehicles; the white background was replaced by the Rizal Monument design on the left side in 2002 for automobiles.

==== Inscriptions ====
- PILIPINAS ("Philippines", used 1981–1995, 2001–2003 for private and government vehicles, and 2001–2014 for commercial and public utility vehicles)
- PHILIPPINES 2000 (1995–2000)
- ANGAT PINOY 2004 ("Rising Filipino 2004", used 2000–2001)
- PILIPINAS – PERLAS NG SILANGAN ("Pearl of the Orient", used 2002)
- MATATAG NA REPUBLIKA ("Strong Republic", used 2003 – April 12, 2014 for private, tourist, and government vehicles)
- MC (used for private motorcycles, placed in the top left)
- TC (used for motorcycles and tricycles for public use or for-hire, placed in the top left)

==== Vehicle classification by color scheme ====
Pattern	Color	Class	Description	Image
ABC 123 AB 1234 (motorcycles) 1234 AB (motorcycles)	Green text on white background (1981–2002); White text on green background (rear only from 1988 to 1995); Green text on Rizal monument background (2002–2014)	Private vehicles	Private vehicles, not for commercial use	
PVA 123 PV 1234 (motorcycles) 1234 PV (motorcycles)	Black text on yellow background (1981–1992; 1995–2014); Yellow text on black background (1992–1995) Black text on Rizal monument background with yellow hue (tourist vehicles)	Public utility vehicles	Public utility vehicles and other for hire vehicles (e.g. Commercial trucks, public transport buses, taxis and jeepneys)	
SBC 123 SB 1234 (Motorcycles) 1234 SB (Motorcycles)	Red text on white background (1981–2003); White text on red background (rear only from 1989 to 1995); Red text on Rizal monument background (2002–2014)	Government vehicles	Vehicles for official government use (e.g. police cars, ambulances, and fire trucks)	
101 10000	Blue text on white background (1981–1989; 1995–2003); White text on blue background (1989–1995); Blue text on Rizal Monument background (2002–2014)	Diplomatic vehicles	Vehicles in diplomatic use: 3 digit diplomatic license plates with blue numbers [above 100] : so far, only observed to be belonging to US Embassy vehicles, often models of American-manufactured vehicles not commercially sold in the country; 4 digit diplomatic license plates with blue numbers on a white background are for members of the Diplomatic Corps (DC) : Ambassador - 1000, Chargé d'affaires, Director-General/Chief Executive/President and immediate deputies/Vice-President-equivalent positions.; 5 digit diplomatic license plates with black numbers on a blue background are for "other exempt vehicles" (OEV) - general diplomatic use including those of lower level officers/staff of the International Non-governmental organizations (INGOs) such as ADB, IRRI, UN agencies	
GOB 123	Red text on yellow background (1981–2014); Yellow text on red background (rear only from 1989 to 1995)	Official bus	Buses for official government use	

== See also ==
- Number coding in the Philippines
- Road signs in the Philippines
