= Time (Richard Carpenter album) =

Studio album by Richard Carpenter
- Released: October 11, 1987
- Recorded: September 1, 1986 – July 5, 1987
- Studios: A&M (Hollywood, California)
- Genre: Pop
- Label: A&M
- Producer: Richard Carpenter

Richard Carpenter chronology
Time (1987)	Pianist, Arranger, Composer, Conductor (1998)

Singles from Time
- 1. "Something in Your Eyes" Released: 1987; 2. "Calling Your Name Again" Released: 1987

Time is the debut solo album by American musician Richard Carpenter.

== Overview ==
Dionne Warwick, Dusty Springfield and Scott Grimes sang on the album, on the songs "In Love Alone", "Something in Your Eyes", and "That's What I Believe", respectively.

The song "When Time Was All We Had" is dedicated to Richard's sister, Karen.

== Critical reception ==
Professional ratings
Review scores
Source	Rating
AllMusic	2/5 stars

In their review of the album, Billboard stated that "long in preparation, Carpenter's solo album shows same devotion to melodic craft and arrangement as his former duo's classic recordings. Vocals -which strike a Beach Boys/Four Freshmen mix on "Who Do You Love?" -may limit appeal slightly, but guest shots by Dusty Springfield and Dionne Warwick should garner swift top 40, AC play."

== Track listing ==
No.	Title	Writer(s)	Length
1.	"Say Yeah!"	Richard Carpenter; Paul Janz; Pamela Phillips Oland	3:51
2.	"Who Do You Love?"	Mark Holden; Peter Hamilton; Gary Pickus	3:15
3.	"Something in Your Eyes" (featuring Dusty Springfield)	Carpenter; Cynthia Weil; Oland; Tom Snow	4:13
4.	"When Time Was All We Had" (a dedication to Karen)	Carpenter; Oland; Tim Rice	3:03
5.	"Time"	Carpenter; Dave Clark	3:34
6.	"Calling Your Name Again"	Carpenter; Richard Marx	4:19
7.	"In Love Alone" (featuring Dionne Warwick)	Carpenter; Hiroaki Serizawa; John Bettis	3:22
8.	"Remind Me to Tell You"	Carpenter; Mark Mueller	3:54
9.	"That's What I Believe" (featuring Scott Grimes)	Carpenter; Dean Pitchford; Oland	4:28
10.	"I'm Still Not Over You"	Carpenter; Alain Boublil; Richard Maltby Jr.	5:51

== Personnel ==
- Richard Carpenter – lead vocals (tracks: 1, 2, 4, 6, 8, 10), keyboards, backing vocals, arrangements
- Dusty Springfield – lead vocals on "Something in Your Eyes"
- Dionne Warwick – lead vocals on "In Love Alone"
- Scott Grimes – lead and backing vocals on "That's What I Believe"
- Tim May – guitar
- Tony Peluso – lead guitar (tracks: 2, 3, 6, 10)
- Joe Osborn – bass guitar
- Bill Lanphier – bass guitar (track: 9)
- Herb Alpert – flugelhorn solo on "When Time Was All We Had"
- Paul Leim – drums
- Paulinho Da Costa – percussion (tracks: 3, 5, 8)
- John Phillips – alto saxophone on "Time" and "That's What I Believe"
- Jim Cox – synthesizer programming
- James Getzoff – concertmaster

Technical

- Michael Bowman, Rob Jacobs, Robert de la Garza – engineer
- Roger Young – recording, mixing
- Chuck Beeson – art direction
- Larry Williams – photography
