= Something in Your Eyes (Richard Carpenter song) =

Single by Richard Carpenter featuring Dusty Springfield

from the album Time
- B-side: "Time"
- Released: September 1987
- Recorded: September 1986
- Genre: Pop
- Label: A&M
- Songwriters: Richard Carpenter; Cynthia Weil; Pamela Phillips Oland; Tom Snow
- Producer: Richard Carpenter

Richard Carpenter singles chronology
"Something in Your Eyes" (1987)	"Calling Your Name Again" (1987)

Dusty Springfield singles chronology
"What Have I Done to Deserve This?" (1987)	"Something in Your Eyes" (1987)	"Nothing Has Been Proved" (1989)

"Something in Your Eyes" is a song by Richard Carpenter, released as the first single from his debut solo album, Time. The song features Dusty Springfield on lead vocals, with Richard producing the arrangement and singing backing vocals. The song failed to chart in most places, only reaching number 84 on the UK singles chart and number 12 on the US Adult Contemporary chart.

== Charts ==
Chart performance for "Something in Your Eyes"
Chart (1987)	Peak position
UK Singles (OCC)	84
US Adult Contemporary (Billboard)	12

== Cover versions ==
In 1987, Hong Kong singer Pat Chan recorded a cover version in Chinese for her self-titled album and as a bonus track in English.

In 2008, the song was covered by Philippine singer Claire de la Fuente as her comeback single from the album Something in Your Eyes.
