= Road signs in the Philippines =

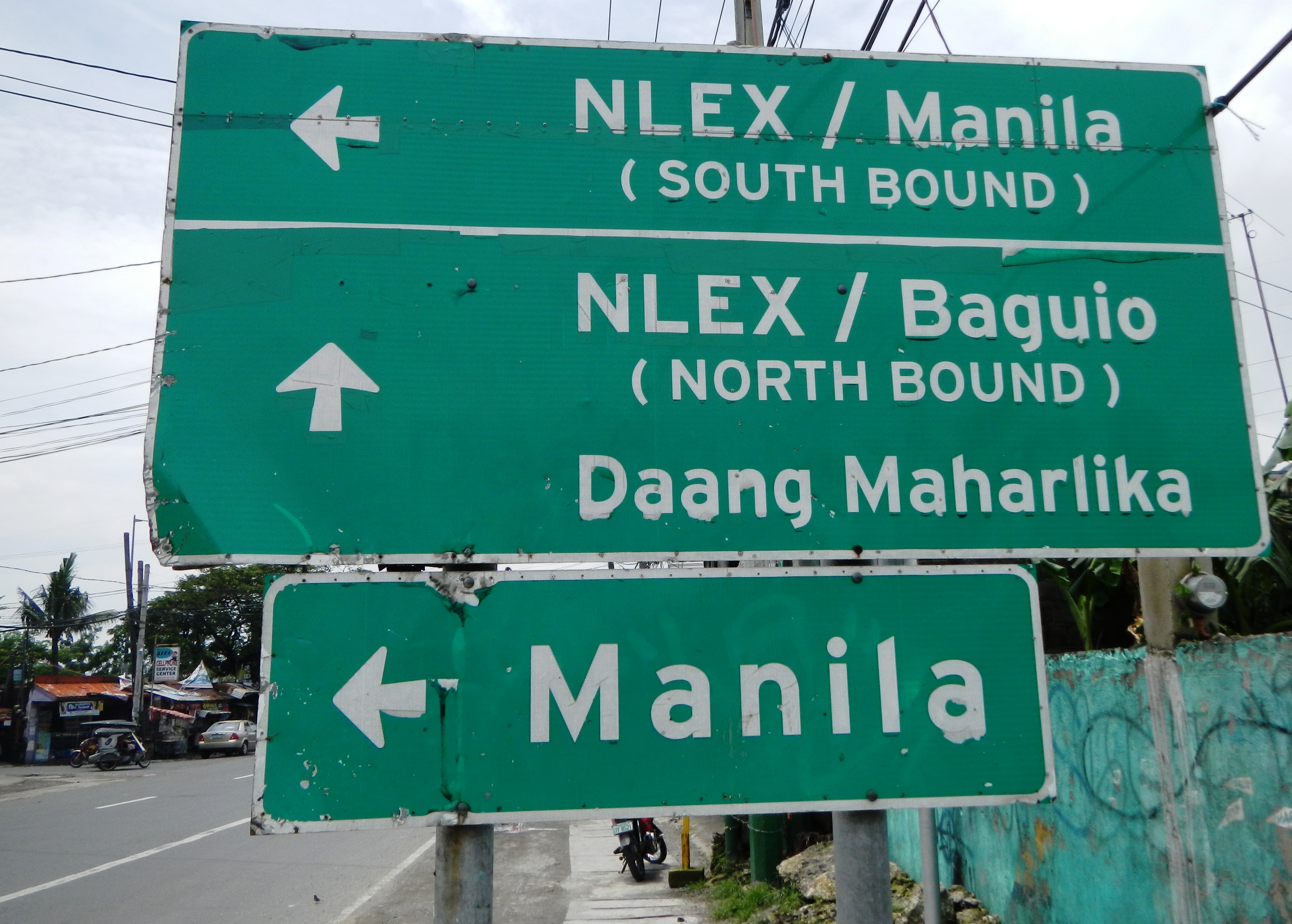
A road sign in Guiguinto, Bulacan, directing motorists to Baguio and Manila

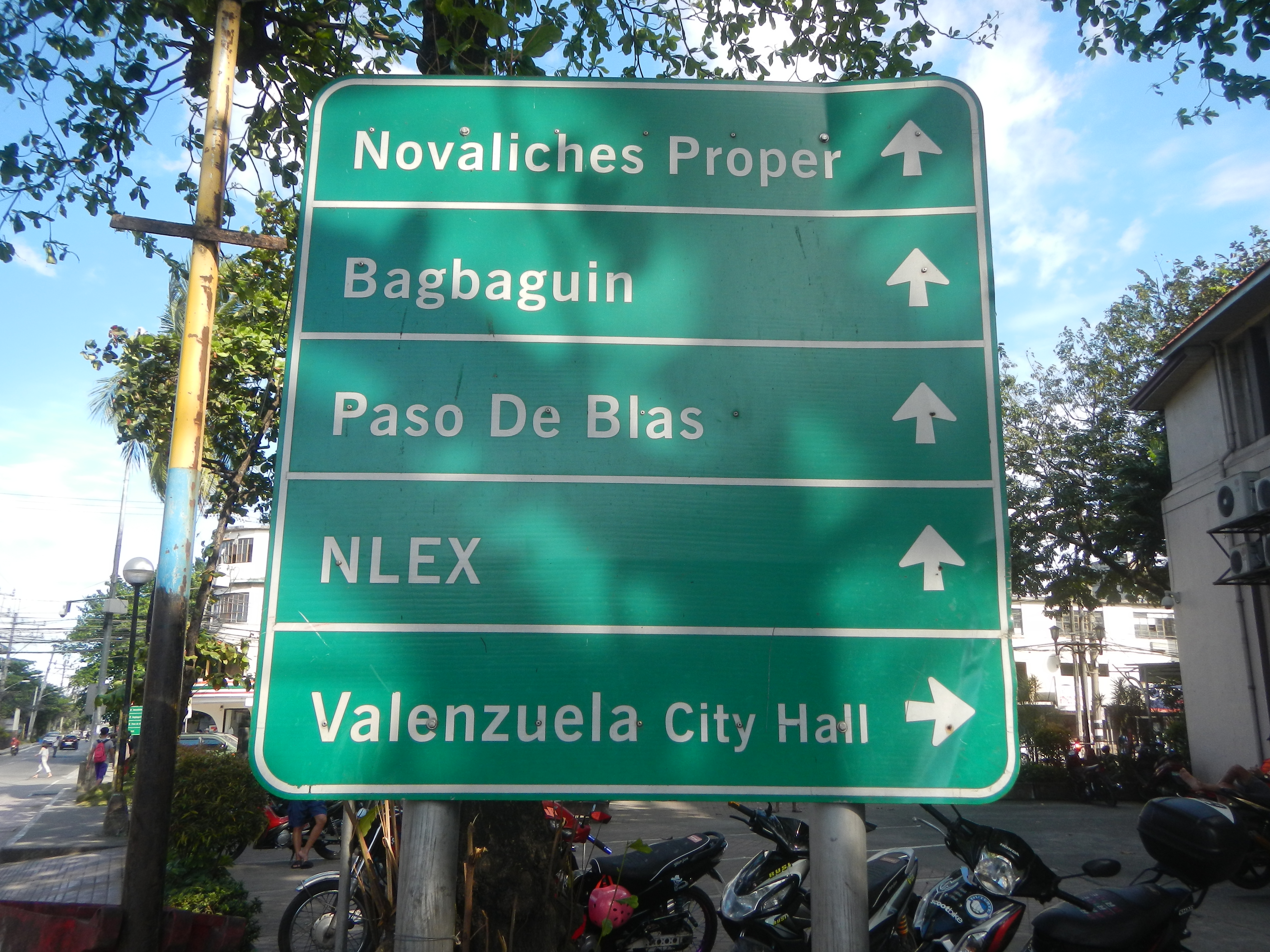
A road sign in Valenzuela showing directions to various destinations

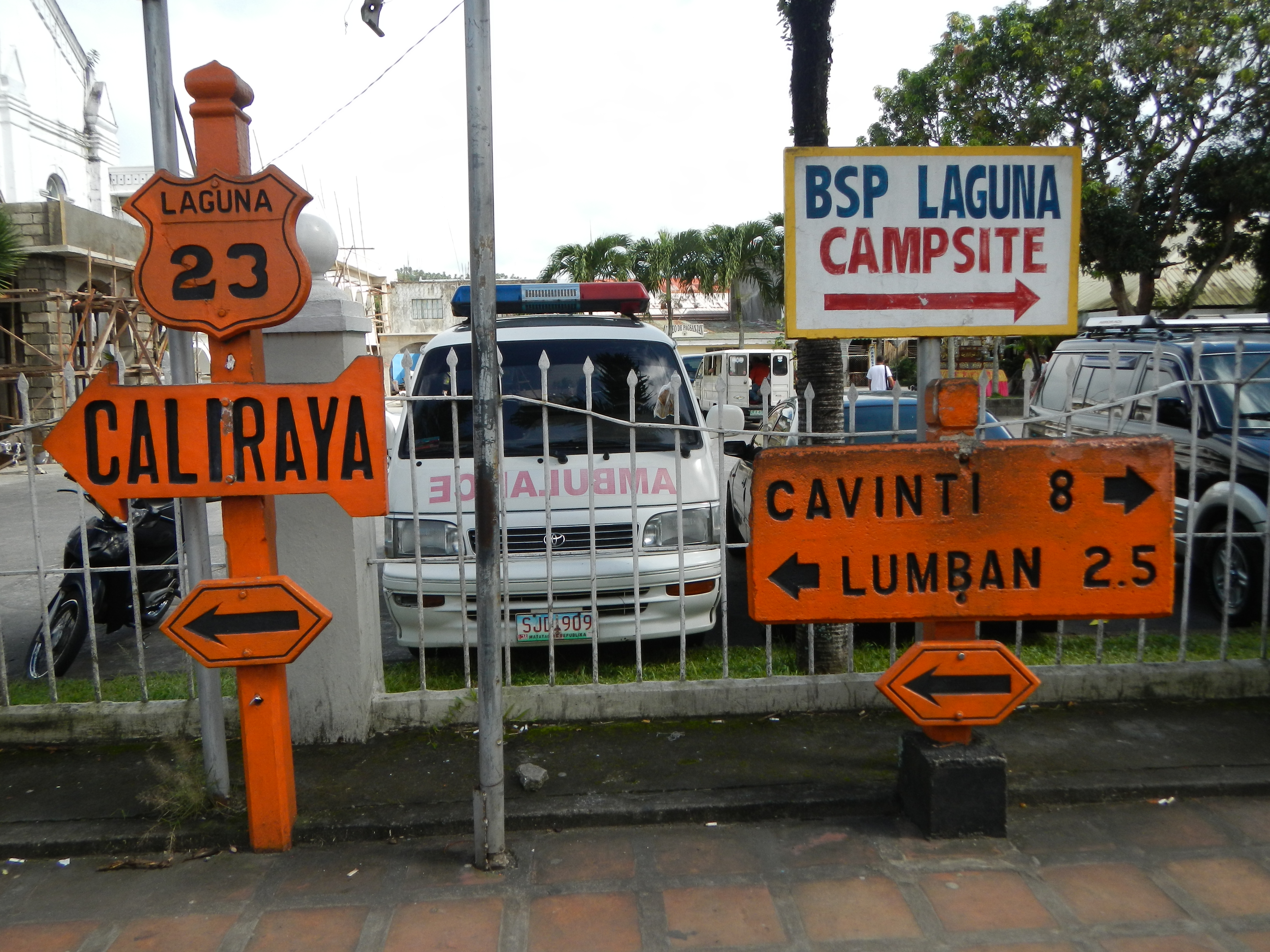
Historical road signs (pictured in 2013) in Pagsanjan, Laguna, featuring former Route 23 (present-day N603)

Road signs in the Philippines are regulated and standardized by the Department of Public Works and Highways (DPWH). Most of the signs reflect minor influences from American and Australian signs but keep a design closer to the Vienna Convention on Road Signs and Signals, to which the Philippines is an original signatory. The Philippines signed the convention on November 8, 1968, and ratified it on December 27, 1973.

Though the Philippines has signed the Vienna Convention on Road Signs and Signals, road signs "Priority Road", "End of priority road", "Give way to oncoming traffic" and "Priority over oncoming traffic", which are mainly found in European countries, are not used in this country as well as in the United States, Canada, and Latin American countries.

Part 2 of the Highway Safety Design Standards Manual mandates the use of the Standard alphabets, often referred to as Highway Gothic. It contains a reproduction of the former Australian implementation AS1744-1975 Standard Alphabets in the appendix pp A103-A146. Clearview appears to have supplanted it, and other fonts are in use.

== Regulatory signs ==
Regulatory signs indicate the application of legal or statutory requirements. Disregarding these signs may constitute the road user to an offense.

=== Priority signs ===
Stop

Give way

Magbigay-daan (Give way) (plate type)

Left turner must give way

=== Directional signs ===
No turns

One way (right)

One way (left)

Keep right

Keep left

Pass either side

All traffic (right)

All traffic (left)

Merging traffic

Two-way traffic

No turns (plate type)

One-way (right, plate type)

One-way (left, plate type)

Keep right (plate type)

Keep left (plate type)

All traffic (right, plate type)

All traffic (left, plate type)

Merging traffic (plate type)

Two-way traffic (plate type)

Salubong na Trapiko (Two-way traffic)

Right lane must turn right

Left lane must turn left

=== Restrictive signs ===
No entry for all vehicles

No entry for all vehicles (plate type)

No entry for cars

No entry for jeepneys

No entry for bicycles

No entry for motorcycles

No entry for tricycles

No entry for buses

No entry for trucks

No entry for vehicles with trailer

No pedestrian crossing

No entry for animal drawn vehicles

No entry for pushcarts

No crossing, use overpass (plate type)

No pedestrian crossing (plate type)

Bawal tumawid, gamitin ang overpass (No crossing, use overpass) (plate type)

No right turn

No right turn (plate type)

No left turn

No left turn (plate type)

No U-turn

No U-turn (plate type)

No overtaking

Bawal lumusot (No overtaking) (plate type)

=== Speed signs ===
Speed restriction (maximum)

Speed limit de-restriction (plate type)

Speed restriction (minimum)

=== Parking signs ===
No parking

Bawal pumarada (No parking)

No parking, loading only

No parking anytime

No parking, tow-away zone

Time restricted parking

Time restricted parking

Loading zone

Loading and unloading zone

No waiting anytime

No waiting

Bawal maghintay ano mang oras (No waiting anytime)

No loading and unloading anytime

Bawal magsakay at magbaba (No loading and unloading)

No loading unloading anytime

No stopping anytime

No parking, public utility bus stop

No parking, public utility jeepney stop

No parking, public utility jeepney stop

Do not block intersection

Right turners cross at broken white lines

=== Miscellaneous signs ===
No blowing of horns

Width restriction

Height restriction

Weight restriction (by tonnes)

Weight restriction (per axle)

Length restriction

End of all restrictions

Fasten seatbelt

Pedestrian crossing

Children crossing

Bicycles lane

Persons with disabilities crossing

== Warning signs ==
Warning signs are used to warn road users to the potential hazard along, or adjacent to, the road. They are triangular and red-bordered, similar to warning signs used in Europe.

=== Horizontal alignment signs ===
Sharp turn (right)

Sharp turn (left)

Reverse turn (right)

Reverse turn (left)

Curve (right)

Curve (left)

Reverse curve (right)

Reverse curve (left)

Winding road (right)

Winding road (left)

Hairpin bend (right)

Hairpin bend (left)

=== Intersection and junction signs ===
Intersection

Staggered intersection (right)

Staggered intersection (left)

Skewed intersection (right)

Skewed intersection (left)

T-junction

Y-junction

Half Y-junction (right)

Half Y-junction (left)

Reverse half Y-junction (right)

Reverse half Y-junction (left)

Side junction (right)

Side junction (left)

Roundabout

Priority, side junction (right)

Priority, side junction (left)

Priority, merging traffic (right)

Priority, merging traffic (left)

Priority, intersection

=== Advance warning of traffic control devices signs ===
Traffic lights ahead

Stop sign ahead

Give way sign ahead

=== Road width signs ===
Narrow bridge

Narrow bridge (plate type)

Road narrows

Road narrows (plate type)

Start of divided traffic

End of divided traffic

=== Road obstacle signs ===
Opening bridge

Uneven road

Hump

Steep descent (right)

Steep descent (left)

Steep climb (right)

Steep climb (left)

Spill way

Flood

Falling debris (right)

Falling debris (left)

Slippery road

Mag-ingat, madulas ang kalsada (Slippery road) (plate type)

Cattle crossing

Low flying aircraft

=== Pedestrian signs ===
Pedestrian crossing ahead

Slow down, pedestrian crossing ahead (plate type)

Children crossing ahead

Cross only at pedestrian crossing

Handicapped crossing

Bike lane ahead

=== Railroad crossing signs ===
Railroad crossing position

Railroad crossing advance warning (unsignalled)

Railroad crossing advance warning (signalled)

Railroad crossing position (alternative)

=== Supplementary signs ===
Advisory speed

On side road (right)

On side road (left)

Distance (meter)

Distance (kilometer)

Next distance (kilometer)

When wet

Blind

Aged

Playground

School

Disabled

For public utility jeepneys

For buses

=== Other warning road signs ===
Vertical clearance

Low clearance

Slow down, accident prone area

Bumagal, madalas ang aksidente dito (Slow down, accident prone area)

Slow down, merging traffic ahead

Lane ends, merge left

Slow down, weighbridge ahead

== Guide or information signs ==
Guide or information signs are used to inform road users about the direction and distances of the route that they are following.

=== Advance direction signs ===
Stack direction (multiple)

Stack direction (single)

Stack direction (with road name)

Diagrammatic direction

Diagrammatic direction (roundabout)

=== Intersection direction signs ===
Intersection direction (right)

Intersection direction (left)

Intersection direction (both sides)

Intersection direction (with road name)

=== Reassurance direction signs ===
Reassurance direction

Reassurance direction (with road name)

=== Finger board and direction signs for less important roads ===
Direction (place)

Direction (road)

Direction (tourist spot)

=== Town names and geographical feature signs ===
Town name

Province name

Geographical feature

=== Service signs ===
Service sign (with name of service, symbols, and distance)

Service sign

Service sign

Service sign

Service sign (advance sign with name of service)

=== Tourist information and tourist destination signs ===
Tourist spot Fort Santiago

Tourist spot Taal Lake

Tourist spot National Museum turn right

Tourist spot scenic lookout on right

=== Route marker signs ===
National Route marker

Expressway Route marker

Route markers

Route markers

Route markers

Route markers

Route markers

Route markers

Route markers

End

=== Asian highway route marker signs ===
Asian highway marker

Asian highway segments

Asian highway segment

Asian highway maintenance jurisdiction

Asian highway segment name

== Expressway signs ==
Expressway signs are signs that are used on, or near, controlled-access roads.

=== Expressway approach signs ===
Expressway approach sign

Expressway approach sign

Expressway approach sign (small)

=== Expressway information signs ===
Prohibited on expressway

Bawal pumasok sasakyang walang tail light (No entry for vehicles without tail light)

Bawal bisikleta motorsiklo sa expressway (No bicycles or motorcycles allowed in expressway)

Toll charges

Lane direction

=== Advance exit signs ===
Advance exit with distance

Advance exit with distance and lane

Supplementary advance exit

=== Exit direction signs ===
Exit with destination

Next exit

Exit

Exit (numbered)

=== Expressway service signs ===
Rest area 2 km right lane

Picnic site 15 km right lane

=== End of expressway signs ===
Expressway ends after 1 km

Expressway ends after 2 km

Start of Expressway

End of Expressway

=== Toll signs ===
Toll Plaza Ahead (with distance)

Stop at Toll Gates

Pay Toll Ahead

=== Expressway traffic instruction and regulatory signs ===
Wrong way, go back

Reduce speed now

Right lane ends, merge left

Lane ends, merge left

== Traffic instruction signs ==
Traffic instruction signs are used to instruct a road user to follow a direction or perform an action. These are also used as a supplement for regulatory and warning signs.

=== Supplementary signs ===
Use overpass

Use pedestrian crossing

Trucks use low gear

=== Movement instruction signs ===
Reduce speed

Stop here on red signal

Low clearance ahead, high vehicles detour

No right turn on red signal

Slow vehicles use right lane

Mabagal na sasakyan mamalagi sa kanan (Slow vehicles keep right)

Trak at bus mamalagi sa kanan maliban kung lulusot (Trucks and buses keep right unless overtaking)

No through road

Road closed

Form 1 lane

Form 2 lanes

== Hazard markers ==
Hazard markers are signs that are usually used in places with obstructions and curves. These signs may be used with or after a warning sign.

Black and white chevron (right)

Black and white chevron (left)

White and red chevron (right)

White and red chevron (left)

One way hazard marker (right)

One way hazard marker (left)

Obstruction marker

Two way hazard marker (large)

Two way hazard marker (small)

Two-way hazard marker

Width marker (right)

Width marker (left)

== Criticism ==
Some writers and motorists have commented on problems with Philippine road signs, such as unclear wording, inconsistent placement, and limited use of Filipino. In 2000, columnist Al S. Mendoza argued that traffic signs should be changed from English to Filipino to improve comprehension. Later articles in the Philippine Daily Inquirer criticized obscure or poorly placed road signs as a safety hazard.

== See also ==
- Vehicle registration plates of the Philippines
