= Nothing Has Been Proved =

Single by Dusty Springfield

from the album Scandal soundtrack and Reputation
- B-side: "Nothing Has Been Proved" (instrumental)
- Released: 13 February 1989
- Recorded: 1989
- Genre: Pop
- Length: 4:45
- Label: Parlophone; EMI
- Songwriters: Chris Lowe; Neil Tennant
- Producers: Chris Lowe; Neil Tennant; Julian Mendelsohn

Dusty Springfield singles chronology
"Something in Your Eyes" (1987)	"Nothing Has Been Proved" (1989)	"In Private" (1989)

Official audio
- "Nothing Has Been Proved" on YouTube

"Nothing Has Been Proved" is a song and a single release by British singer Dusty Springfield, written and produced by the Pet Shop Boys. The song was the second collaboration between Springfield and the Pet Shop Boys, following their UK #2 and US #2 hit duet "What Have I Done to Deserve This?" in 1987. "Nothing Has Been Proved" prominently features an orchestral arrangement by Angelo Badalamenti and a soprano saxophone solo, as the song fades, by Courtney Pine. Marshall Jefferson provided a dance mix which appeared on the 12" and CD singles.

"Nothing Has Been Proved" was produced for the 1989 film Scandal, an account of the Profumo affair, a famous British political scandal in 1963 which severely undermined confidence in the ruling Conservative Party government. The song is heard over the end credits of the film. When film producer Stephen Woolley invited the Pet Shop Boys to submit a song for the soundtrack, Neil Tennant remembered a song he had written some years earlier, before the formation of the duo. He and Chris Lowe wrote new music for the song, and with Woolley's approval asked Dusty Springfield to sing it. According to Tennant, Woolley liked the idea of having the song performed by someone who was already well known at the time of the Profumo affair; in 1963, Dusty was lead singer of the popular group the Springfields and was just about to launch her solo career.

The lyrics of the song describe in roughly chronological order the actual course of events and mention, by first name only, the main characters involved: Mandy Rice-Davies, Christine Keeler and Stephen Ward, as well as Lucky Gordon, Johnny Edgecombe and Vickie Barrett. The song also references the popular culture of the time with the line "Please Please Me's number one", a reference to the Beatles' debut album which dominated the sales charts for much of the year and was, as described in the song, number one both at the time of Profumo's resignation in May 1963, and the conclusion of Ward's trial at the end of July. (Note: The single of the same name was also listed as a number one hit in several charts of the time, though this occurred in February and early March 1963, some time before the events recounted in the song.)

"Nothing Has Been Proved" reached No. 16 on the UK Singles Chart and led to further chart success for Springfield. "Nothing Has Been Proved", was later included as a track on Springfield's successful comeback album Reputation, released in 1990. Pet Shop Boys would later accept another commission from Woolley, to produce music for the 1992 film The Crying Game.

The original Pet Shop Boys demo recording of "Nothing Has Been Proved", with lead vocals by Neil Tennant, was included on the expanded re-issue of their 1988 album Introspective in 2001.

== Music video ==
The music video shows Springfield in the studio, along with a Christine Keeler look-alike being interviewed with camera flash bulbs going off. There are also short clips from the film Scandal, which starred Joanne Whalley, John Hurt, Ian McKellen, Britt Ekland and Bridget Fonda, as well as original news footage from 1963. The Pet Shop Boys play journalists interviewing Christine.

== Track listing ==
7": Parlophone / R 6207 (UK)

1. "Nothing Has Been Proved" (Single Version) – 4:45
2. "Nothing Has Been Proved" (Unique 7" Instrumental) – 5:50

12": Parlophone / 12R 6207 (UK) / CD: Parlophone CDR 6207 (UK)

1. "Nothing Has Been Proved" (Dance Mix) – 5:56
2. "Nothing Has Been Proved" (Full Length Version) – 5:56
3. "Nothing Has Been Proved" (Instrumental) – 5:50

== Charts ==
=== Weekly charts ===
Chart (1989)	Peak position
Australia (ARIA)	145
Belgium (Ultratop 50 Flanders)	24
Ireland (IRMA)	10
Italy Airplay (Music & Media)	9
Netherlands (Single Top 100)	26
New Zealand (Recorded Music NZ)	33
UK Singles (OCC)	16
West Germany (GfK)	52

== Cover version ==
A cover version of the song by Italo house group the Strings of Love reached No. 59 on the UK Singles Chart in March 1990 with a remix by Paul Oakenfold.
