= What Have I Done to Deserve This? (song) =

1987 single by Dusty Springfield and Pet Shop Boys

Single by Pet Shop Boys with Dusty Springfield

from the album Actually
- B-side: "A New Life"
- Written: 1984
- Released: 10 August 1987
- Recorded: December 1986
- Studio: Sarm West and Advision (London)
- Genre: Synth-pop; dance-pop
- Length: 4:19
- Label: Parlophone (UK); Manhattan (USA)
- Songwriters: Chris Lowe; Neil Tennant; Allee Willis
- Producer: Stephen Hague

Pet Shop Boys singles chronology
"It's a Sin" (1987)	"What Have I Done to Deserve This?" (1987)	"Rent" (1987)

Dusty Springfield singles chronology
"Sometimes Like Butterflies" (1985)	"What Have I Done to Deserve This?" (1987)	"Something in Your Eyes" (1987)

Music video
- "What Have I Done to Deserve This?" on YouTube

"What Have I Done to Deserve This?" is a song by English synth-pop duo Pet Shop Boys and soul singer Dusty Springfield, taken from the duo's second studio album, Actually (1987). The song was released as the second single from the album on 10 August 1987.

A commercial success in both the United Kingdom and North America, the song helped revive Springfield's career and led to a resurgence of interest in her music. Following the single, the Pet Shop Boys wrote and produced the singles "Nothing Has Been Proved" and "In Private" for Springfield, both included on her album Reputation (1990).

== Background ==
"What Have I Done to Deserve This?" marked Pet Shop Boys' first major collaboration with another recording artist.

The song was originally written and demoed around Christmas 1984 with the assistance of notable American songwriter Allee Willis. It was originally intended for inclusion on Please, but the problem was to decide who would sing the other half of the duet. Various contemporary singers were suggested to them, but none of them seemed suitable for the song. Eventually their manager's assistant suggested Dusty Springfield, whose 1969 album Dusty in Memphis was often acknowledged by Neil Tennant as his favourite LP.

But according to Tennant, EMI Records — parent company of their record label Parlophone — did not want the duo to work with Springfield, instead suggesting Barbra Streisand or Tina Turner for the collaboration. Springfield's popularity had suffered a major decline since her peak in the late 1960s and her last top 40 entry on the UK Singles Chart, "How Can I Be Sure" was in 1970. The Independent's Adam Sweeting described the ensuing years for Springfield as "a litany of unmemorable albums, while her private life became a free-fall into drugs, alcohol and self-mutilation". However, Tennant was insistent on having Springfield record the song.

Initially, within a few weeks of sending a demo of the song to Springfield's manager, word came back that she was not interested in performing the duet, so the duet song was postponed. At that time, Springfield was unfamiliar with Pet Shop Boys, but she had heard "West End Girls" on the radio and reportedly liked the song. Several months later, Springfield's manager contacted the duo informing them that she wanted to record the duet. Springfield had no recording contract at this time. She was living in California and travelled to London for the recording sessions in December 1986. Chris Welch of The Independent wrote that Springfield "didn't know quite what the group wanted", but Tennant explained to her they wanted her distinctive "husky, breathy voice" to feature.

Tennant recalls the recording session with Springfield:

"She arrived at the studio on time, in a black leather designer jacket and high-heeled boots, with blonde hair and black eye make-up, clutching the lyric-sheet of the song, annotated and underlined. Chris Lowe, Stephen Hague and I began to consult with the legend about how to sing our song and she was very nice, surprisingly a little lacking in self-confidence. As if by telepathy, a Dusty fan appeared on the studio doorstep and was invited in to listen. Dusty's English secretary arrived bearing a new compilation cassette. 'They keep repackaging the old songs,' the legend marvelled. Then she went through to sing.

Her voice was the same as ever. When she sang her solo part 'Since you went away ...' everyone in the control room smiled. She sounded just like she used to. Breathy, warm, thrilling. Like Dusty Springfield."

== Composition ==
"What Have I Done to Deserve This?" is a synth-pop song composed in the key of A minor. According to its sheet music, it features the moderate tempo of 120 beats per minute. In a review for AllMusic, Ned Raggett states the track "springs to life with a seemingly off-kilter drum break, then slides right into a smart, deceptively simple, and full-bodied combination of big drums and sparkling keyboards."

Written by Neil Tennant, Chris Lowe and Allee Willis in early 1985, Classic Pop noted the song's somewhat peculiar structure reflects the way it was composed: "Lowe wrote the riff and the music for the 'I bought you drinks, I bought you flowers' section; Tennant came up with the verse; and Willis wrote the 'Since you went away' part." Tennant wrote the majority of the lyrics while on the bus home from his job at Smash Hits. Lyrically, Sound on Sound describes the song as "a number about the mundane lives of bored '80s yuppies", while according to Nick Levine for the BBC, the lyrics "reflect the emphasis placed on personal financial gain during the Thatcher and Reagan years", with the song's opening lines being "You always wanted a lover, I only wanted a job."

The track was recorded at Advision Studios, and produced by Stephen Hague, engineered by David Jacob and mixed by Julian Mendelsohn, who co-produced Actually, at Sarm West Studios. While Tennant's vocal recording was relatively straightforward, Springfield was very particular with her vocals, according to Mendelsohn, who said, "even though Dusty was a great singer, she was very long-winded when it came to getting the vocals right to her own satisfaction."

== Critical reception ==
In a contemporary review in Smash Hits, Vici McDonald wrote: "The brilliant thing about the Pet Shop Boys is that they get everything right – memorable tunes, perfect production, intelligent lyrics, excellent sleeves, loads of style and a self-deprecating sense of humour – a very rare combination. So, having decided to do a duet with a soulful chicklet, they've naturally got the best – '60s songstress and living legend Dusty Springfield." Billboard called "What Have I Done to Deserve This?" an "infectious technopop duet".

In a 2017 article for NME, Nick Levine called it "possibly the greatest pop song in history", writing: "We can chat 'hooks' and 'unusual structure' all you want, but this song just has that thing: before it's even finished, you already want to play it again."

Included in a feature of the best duets of all time by The Daily Telegraph, writer Catherine Gee characterised the track as a "deceptively bouncy song of lovelorn misery was clearly written for two of the most idiosyncratic voices in pop. Neil Tennant raps a lugubrious verse about spilt drinks and wilting flowers, before Dusty floats in with a raspy whisper stained by life's disappointments." Craig Mclean of the same publication described the song as "a verifiable Eighties classic", a view echoed by The Independent's Graeme Ross, who called the song one of Springfield's best, writing: "An unmistakable and unforgettable Dusty vocal was layered over trademark Pet Shop Boys synth-pop and the result was an Eighties classic." Caroline Westbrook of Metro called it "a thing of beauty" in an article on the chart hits of 1987.

American LGBT magazine The Advocate included the song in a list of the 10 best queer duets, calling it one of "pop music's most memorable LGBT pairings". Singer David McAlmont called "What Have I Done to Deserve This?" his "unassailable favourite song" of Springfield's in a feature published in The Observer celebrating pop music's landmark gay moments, describing her vocal performance as "a profound interpretation of [songwriter] Allee Willis's sugary chorus".

== Commercial performance ==
When released as a single in August 1987, "What Have I Done to Deserve This?" became a top 3 hit on both sides of the Atlantic.

In the United Kingdom it debuted at number 10 before peaking at number 2, where it remained for two consecutive weeks.

In the United States "What Have I Done to Deserve This" peaked at number 2 on the Billboard Hot 100, becoming the fourth top ten hit for Pet Shop Boys as well as the biggest hit of Springfield's career in the United States.

The song also helped revive Springfield's career and led to an increase of sales and interest in her previous songs. The single made it to number 1 on the Irish singles chart, where it was Pet Shop Boys' second number 1 hit in the space of just six weeks.

In the UK, the song is the fourth most streamed Pet Shop Boys song of all time.

== Music video ==
The music video was directed by Eric Watson and was filmed at Brixton Academy in London, featuring a female chorus line and male members of the pit orchestra. Lowe played one of the musicians, using his own trombone, and Tennant played a singer, both in black tie. Springfield also appeared to sing her parts. The video made significant use of the stage curtains for dramatic effect, with Lowe dancing behind them as the silhouettes of the showgirls could be seen from the other side.

The song also appears in the film It Couldn't Happen Here (1988), where it is briefly played in instrumental form and as a duet mimed by Tennant and co-star Barbara Windsor.

== Live performances ==
Pet Shop Boys and Dusty Springfield performed the song for the 1988 Brit Awards. Since Springfield's death in 1999, Pet Shop Boys have performed the song live several times with guest performers singing Springfield's parts. In 2000, singer Cerys Matthews performed the song with Pet Shop Boys during their set at Glastonbury Festival. At the 2009 Brit Awards, where the duo received an Outstanding Contribution to Music award, Pet Shop Boys performed the song with Lady Gaga. During their 2019 headline set at Radio 2 Live in Hyde Park, the duo were joined by Beverley Knight to perform the song.

== Track listings ==
- 7" Parlophone / R 6163 (UK)
1. "What Have I Done to Deserve This?" – 4:19
2. "A New Life" – 4:55
- 12" Parlophone / 12 R 6163 (UK)
1. "What Have I Done to Deserve This?" (Extended Mix) – 6:53
2. "A New Life" – 4:55
3. "What Have I Done to Deserve This?" (Disco Mix) – 8:13

also available on CD (Parlophone / CD R 6163)

- 12" EMI-Manhattan / V-56080 (US - First Issue)
1. "What Have I Done to Deserve This?" (Disco Mix) – 8:17
2. "Rent" (Extended Mix) – 7:06
- 12" EMI-Manhattan / V-56080 (US - Second Issue)
1. "What Have I Done to Deserve This?" (The Shep Pettibone Remix) – 8:28
2. "What Have I Done to Deserve This?" (Dub Mix) – 6:53
3. "Rent" (The François Kevorkian Remix) – 7:04
4. "I Want a Dog" – 4:48

== Charts ==
=== Weekly charts ===
Weekly chart performance for "What Have I Done to Deserve This?"
Chart (1987–1988)	Peak position
Australia (Australian Music Report)	22
Austria (Ö3 Austria Top 40)	11
Belgium (Ultratop 50 Flanders)	5
Canada Top Singles (RPM)	3
Europe (European Hot 100 Singles)	4
Finland (Suomen virallinen lista)	2
Iceland (Íslenski Listinn)	2
Ireland (IRMA)	1
Italy (Musica e dischi)	7
Italy Airplay (Music & Media)	8
Luxembourg (Radio Luxembourg)	1
Netherlands (Dutch Top 40)	2
Netherlands (Single Top 100)	2
New Zealand (Recorded Music NZ)	6
Norway (VG-lista)	9
Quebec (ADISQ)	4
South Africa (Springbok Radio)	16
Spain (AFYVE)	5
Sweden (Sverigetopplistan)	2
Switzerland (Schweizer Hitparade)	5
UK Singles (Official Charts)	2
US Billboard Hot 100	2
US Adult Contemporary (Billboard)	14
US Dance Club Songs (Billboard)	1
US Dance Singles Sales (Billboard)	12
US Cash Box Top 100 Singles	1
West Germany (GfK)	4

=== Year-end charts ===
1987 year-end chart performance for "What Have I Done to Deserve This?"
Chart (1987)	Position
Belgium (Ultratop 50 Flanders)	54
Europe (European Hot 100 Singles)	51
Netherlands (Dutch Top 40)	54
Netherlands (Single Top 100)	46
New Zealand (RIANZ)	45
UK Singles (Gallup)	42
West Germany (Media Control)	45

1988 year-end chart performance for "What Have I Done to Deserve This?"
Chart (1988)	Position
Canada Top Singles (RPM)	55
US Billboard Hot 100	50
US Dance Club Play (Billboard)	10
US Cash Box Top 100 Singles	14

== Certifications ==
Certifications for "What Have I Done to Deserve This?"
Region	Certification	Certified units/sales
Sweden (GLF)	Gold	25,000^{^}
United Kingdom (BPI)	Silver	250,000^{^}
^{^} Shipments figures based on certification alone.
