= In Private =

Single by Dusty Springfield

from the album Reputation
- B-side: "In Private" (instrumental)
- Released: 20 November 1989
- Recorded: 1989
- Genre: Synth-pop
- Length: 4:18
- Label: Parlophone; EMI
- Songwriters: Chris Lowe; Neil Tennant
- Producers: Chris Lowe; Neil Tennant; Julian Mendelsohn

Dusty Springfield singles chronology
| "Nothing Has Been Proved" (1989) | "In Private" (1989) | "Reputation" (1990) |

Audio sample
- file; help

Music video
- "In Private" on YouTube

"In Private" is a song by British singer Dusty Springfield, released as a single on 20 November 1989 by Parlophone and EMI. It was Springfield's third single in a row to be a chart success, after an absence of nearly two decades from the charts. Both "In Private" and Springfield's previous single, "Nothing Has Been Proved" were produced by Pet Shop Boys, who helped return Springfield to prominence with their 1987 hit collaboration "What Have I Done to Deserve This?". Both Springfield singles were included on her 1990 British album Reputation. "In Private" peaked at number 14 in the British charts and was a top ten hit in West Germany, the Netherlands, Belgium (Flanders), Israel and Sweden. In 2025, Billboard magazine ranked it number 26 in their list of "The 100 Greatest LGBTQ+ Anthems of All Time".

== Releases ==
A separate remix single with an orange cover – as opposed to the other formats' colours of green (also used for 12" and 7" versions) and purple (for the CD single) – was also released both on 12" and CD in certain territories, featuring three radically rearranged and remixed dance versions by Shep Pettibone.

== Critical reception ==
Bruce Eder from AllMusic commented, "She seems to reach that much higher and also that much deeper inside of herself on 'In Private' and 'Daydreaming' to much subtler effect; those cuts are very much of a piece with her best work on the Dusty in Memphis, A Brand New Me, and Cameo albums". Paul Lester from Melody Maker opined that it "sounds like a last-minute rummage through the scrag-ends left deservedly on the studio floor and hastily slung together just in time for tea. Actually, it's not much more than a replay of Liza Minnelli-via-Hazell Dean's 'Love Pains'". A reviewer from Music & Media complimented the song as "a strong number in a 60s style." David Giles of Music Week described it as another Pet Shop Boys composition "with the duo characteristically mournful keyboards giving the song a somewhat tragic feel. It works perfectly for Dusty."

== Chart performance ==
In UK, "In Private" entered the singles chart at number 34 on 2 December 1989, reached a peak of number 14 two weeks later, and totaled ten weeks on the chart, four of them spent in the top 20. Similarly, it peaked at number 14 on the Pan-European Hot 100 Singles chart compiled by Music & Media, a position it achieved in its tenth week, and at number 13 in Ireland where it appeared for seven weeks on the chart. Elsewhere in Europe, "In Private" peaked within the top ten in four nations: the Flanders region of Belgium where it atteined number two for consecutive three weeks, its highest position of any chart, West Germany where it culminated at number four twice out of a 30-week chart run, Sweden and the Netherlands where it reached number seven and eight, respectively. The song became the 13th and 14th best-selling single of 1990 in Flanders and West Germany. In addition, it peaked at number 17 in Finland and number 36 in France where it had an eleven chart run in the top 50. Outside Europe, it failed to reach the top 100 in Australia, stalling at number 136.

== Cover versions ==
The song was later re-recorded and released in 2006 on Fundamentalism, the limited edition second disc released with the Pet Shop Boys' album Fundamental. A different mix of this recording appeared as the B-side to the single "Minimal", released the same year, and was subsequently included in the B-sides compilation Format. It is performed as a duet between Neil Tennant and Elton John. The fact that both of them are openly gay men makes all the more pointed the song's subject of a hidden relationship that one of the participants is ashamed to admit to, especially on the following lines: Tennant: "What you gonna say when you run back to your wife?" / John: "I guess it's just the story of my life...!" / Both: "What are you gonna say...?"

The song was also recorded by the Swedish pop group, Nouveau Riche, as a hidden track on their 2007 album "Pink Trash". In 2008, it was covered by another Swedish band, Sahara Hotnights, peaking at 7th position at the Swedish singles chart.

In 1996, a Dutch cover version of the song (Ik wil alles met je doen, ‘I want to do everything with you’) was a big comeback hit for Flemish singer, Liliane Saint-Pierre.

== Track listings ==
- 7" single / Cassette
1. "In Private" — 4:21
2. "In Private" (instrumental) — 4:21
- 12" maxi / CD maxi
1. "In Private" (12" version) — 7:12
2. "In Private" (7" version) — 4:24
3. "In Private" (instrumental version) — 4:24
- 12" maxi / CD maxi - Remixes
1. "In Private" (remix) — 8:53
2. "In Private" (dub) — 6:34
3. "In Private" (bonus beats) — 3:56

== Personnel ==
- Written and produced by Pet Shop Boys
- Backing vocals by Carol Kenyon and Katie Kissoon
- Co-produced and mixed and engineered by Julian Mendelsohn
- Assistant: Danton Supple
- Fairlight- and keyboard programming by Gary Maughan
- Remixes by Shep Pettibone
- Artwork by 3a
- Catalog#:
  - on spine: 20 3618 6
  - on back sleeve K: 060 20 3618 6
  - on labels: 060-20 3618 6

== Charts ==
=== Weekly charts ===
Weekly chart performance for "In Private"
| Chart (1989–1990) | Peak position |
|---|---|
| Australia (ARIA) | 136 |
| Belgium (Ultratop 50 Flanders) | 2 |
| Europe (Eurochart Hot 100) | 14 |
| Finland (Suomen virallinen lista) | 17 |
| France (SNEP) | 36 |
| Ireland (IRMA) | 13 |
| Israel (Israeli Singles Chart) | 4 |
| Italy Airplay (Music & Media) | 13 |
| Luxembourg (Radio Luxembourg) | 13 |
| Netherlands (Dutch Top 40) | 9 |
| Netherlands (Single Top 100) | 8 |
| Sweden (Sverigetopplistan) | 7 |
| UK (Gallup) | 14 |
| West Germany (GfK) | 4 |

=== Year-end charts ===
Year-end chart performance for "In Private"
| Chart (1990) | Position |
|---|---|
| Belgium (Ultratop) | 13 |
| Europe (Eurochart Hot 100) | 57 |
| Europe (European Airplay Top 50) | 9 |
| Europe (European Hit Radio) | 7 |
| Germany (Media Control) | 14 |
| Netherlands (Dutch Top 40) | 67 |
| Sweden (Topplistan) | 71 |
