= Living Without Your Love =

Studio album by Dusty Springfield
- Released: January 1979 (US); 16 March 1979 (UK)
- Recorded: June–September 1978
- Studio: ABC, Los Angeles, California; United Western, Los Angeles, California; Cherokee, Los Angeles, California
- Genre: Pop, disco
- Length: 36:52
- Label: United Artists (US); Mercury (UK)
- Producer: David Wolfert

Dusty Springfield chronology
It Begins Again (1978)	Living Without Your Love (1979)	White Heat (1982)

Living Without Your Love is the eleventh studio album recorded by singer Dusty Springfield, and tenth released. The album was recorded in summer 1978 and released in early 1979.

== Background ==
While Living Without Your Love was produced by session musician David Wolfert instead of Roy Thomas Baker, it was another no-expenses-spared Los Angeles production, recorded with more or less the same session musicians as the previous album and partly in the same studios. Living Without Your Love failed to chart in the US nor the UK.

The album was originally titled Never Trust a Man in a Rented Tuxedo and then also had slightly risqué cover art, picturing a near naked Springfield coming out of a hotel room shower, only covering herself up with a towel and a man in a tuxedo leaving the room. These plans were however shelved and the album was instead issued under the name Living Without Your Love and new cover art.

== Touring ==
The track chosen to promote the album in the UK was the ballad "I'm Coming Home Again", a cover of a song released on Gladys Knight's first solo album the year before. The single was released simultaneously with the announcement that Springfield was to embark on a month-long UK tour, her first live dates in Britain in more than six years. When she arrived in the UK, however, she was met by the news that all concerts in the provinces had been cancelled due to poor ticket sales. Springfield subsequently made an appearance on UK TV wearing a black veil, jokingly saying she was "in mourning because all my dates have been cancelled". She also made a playback performance singing "I'm Coming Home Again", with the comment that the lyrics perhaps weren't as relevant any longer.

Springfield did play two live dates at London's Drury Lane Theatre, and one charity concert at the Royal Albert Hall in the presence of Princess Margaret, which all sold-out and were major successes. However, during the Albert Hall concert Springfield made the off-the-cuff remark "I am glad to see that the royalty isn't confined to the box", a tongue-in-cheek reference to her large homosexual following and the drag queens in the audience. The Princess took this as a personal insult, and later sent the singer a typewritten apology to the Queen which Springfield was made to sign and return.

The publicity about the cancelled homecoming tour, and the Albert Hall debacle, didn't help her record sales in the UK. Living Without Your Love consequently became her last LP recorded for Phonogram, a company with which she had been associated, in various forms (Fontana Records/Philips Records/Mercury Records), for nearly twenty years. Two non-album singles produced by David Mackay were recorded and released in the UK that same year. "Baby Blue", written and co-produced by Trevor Horn, Geoff Downes, and Bruce Woolley, was a disco-pop track, which was also issued as an extended 12" single and became a minor club hit (No. 61), but "Your Love Still Brings Me to My Knees" never charted and the track became Springfield's swan song for Phonogram.

== Release ==
In 2002, Mercury/Universal Music released Living Without Your Love on CD for the first time.

An edited version of the 1979 concert at the Royal Albert Hall was released on both CD and DVD by Eagle Rock in 2005.

== Reception ==
Professional ratings
Review scores
Source	Rating
AllMusic	3/5 stars
Christgau's Record Guide	B+
Music Week	3/4 stars

Reviewing in Christgau's Record Guide: Rock Albums of the Seventies (1981), Robert Christgau wrote: "Fledgling producer David Wolfert doesn't get [Springfield's] voice as subtly as Roy Thomas Baker (or Jerry Wexler) did, but he gives her more good songs than she's had in a decade. Also more good sides: one, featuring a 'You've Really Got a Hold on Me' that vies with Smokey's, and 'Closet Man,' which is about what it sounds like and nice indeed."

== Track listing ==
Side A

1. "You've Really Got a Hold on Me" (Smokey Robinson) – 3:49
2. "You Can Do It" (Evie Sands, Richard Germinaro, Ben Weisman) – 4:12
3. "Be Somebody" (Melissa Manchester, Vini Poncia, John Vastano) – 3:24
4. "Closet Man" (David Foster, Donny Gerrard, Eric Mercury) – 4:09
5. "Living Without Your Love" (Steve Nelson, David Wolfert) – 3:36

Side B

1. "Save Me, Save Me" (Albhy Galuten, Barry Gibb) – 3:06
2. "Get Yourself to Love" (Douglas McCormick) – 4:06
3. "I Just Fall in Love Again" (Steve Dorff, Larry Herbstritt, Harry Lloyd, Gloria Sklerov) – 3:14
4. "Dream On" (Franne Golde, Dennis Mayoff, Carole Bayer Sager) – 3:32
5. "I'm Coming Home Again" (Bruce Roberts, Carole Bayer Sager) – 3:44

== Personnel ==
- Dusty Springfield – vocals, background vocals
- Dianne Brooks – background vocals
- Patti Brooks – background vocals
- Brenda Russell – background vocals
- Ed Greene – drums
- Lenny Castro – percussion
- Gary Coleman – percussion, vibraphone
- Will Lee – bass guitar
- Scott Edwards – bass guitar
- Dennis Budimir – guitar
- David Wolfert – guitar
- Jay Graydon – guitar
- Neil Larsen – keyboards
- Lincoln Mayorga – keyboards
- Jai Winding – keyboards
- Ian Underwood – synthesizer
- Michael Canahan – saxophone
- David Leull – baritone saxophone
- Tom Saviano – alto, soprano & tenor saxophone
- Dick Hyde – trombone
- Steve Madaio – trumpet, flugelhorn, horn
- Harry Bluestone – concert master
- Nick DeCaro – musical conductor
- Gene Page – musical conductor

=== Production ===
- David Wolfert – record producer, horn arrangements, rhythm arrangements
- Dusty Springfield – associate producer
- Charles Koppelman – executive producer
- Myles Chase – rhythm arrangements
- Nick DeCaro – string arrangements
- Gene Page – string arrangements
- Tom Saviano – horn arrangements, rhythm arrangements
- Al Schmitt Jr. – sound engineer
- Sheridan Eldridge – engineer
- John Weaver – engineer
- John H.R. Mills – engineer, remixing
- Mike Reese – mastering
- Frank DeCaro – contractor
- Joe Black – co-ordination
- Linda Gerrity – production co-ordination
- Bill Burks – art direction, design
- Roger Wake – digital remastering (2002 reissue)
- Mike Gill – executive producer (2002 reissue)
- Paul Howes – liner notes (2002 reissue)

== Sources ==
- Howes, Paul (2001). The Complete Dusty Springfield. London: Reynolds & Hearn Ltd. ISBN 1-903111-24-2, pages 65, 77, 92, 96, 130–131, 147–148, 173–174, 211, 274, 281.
- Liner notes, Dusty Springfield: Living Without Your Love (2002 re-issue), Mercury Records/Universal Music 586 005–2.
- Liner notes, Dusty Springfield: Live at the Royal Albert Hall, Eagle Rock EAGCD310, GAS 0000310 EAG, ER20081-2 (CD), EV 30133-9 (DVD), 2005.
