= White Heat (Dusty Springfield album) =

Studio album by Dusty Springfield
- Released: December 1982
- Recorded: November 1981 – June 1982
- Studio: Conway (Hollywood); Kendun (Burbank); Group IV (Hollywood)
- Genre: Pop; synth-pop; funk; disco; new wave
- Length: 37:44
- Label: Casablanca
- Producer: Howard Steele; Dusty Springfield

Dusty Springfield chronology
Living Without Your Love (1979)	White Heat (1982)	Reputation (1990)

White Heat is the twelfth studio album recorded by singer Dusty Springfield, and eleventh released. It was only released in the United States and Canada.

More so than her previous two albums, It Begins Again (1978), and Living Without Your Love (1979), and the non-album single "It Goes Like It Goes" (1980), White Heat was a distinct departure from Springfield's Los Angeles-produced radio-friendly soft rock sound, being closely identified with the new wave, synth-pop sounds of the early 1980s. The album arguably contains the most diverse selection of genres to be collected on any Dusty Springfield studio album, ranging from Robbie Buchanan's ballad "Time and Time Again", orchestrated by James Newton Howard, to the aggressive hard rock of "Blind Sheep", co-written by Springfield herself. The sessions for "Blind Sheep" are the last designated sessions for Twentieth Century Fox Records in the Musician's Guild Logs.

The album's opening track and only single release was "Donnez-Moi (Give It to Me)" which production wise took more than a few hints from contemporaneous synthesizer-driven pop productions by Giorgio Moroder, like Donna Summer's The Wanderer and Irene Cara's "Flashdance... What a Feeling", and British New Romantic bands like the Human League and their 1981 album Dare.

== Background and recording ==
Jean-Alain Roussel lived in Montreal at the time. Springfield lived part-time in Toronto at this stage in her life; the two met through mutual friends and ended up collaborating on most of White Heat.

Written by Canadian New Wave band Rough Trade's Carole Pope and Kevan Staples, "Soft Core" describes the realities of a dysfunctional relationship. "Soft Core" was cut in a single take by sheer mistake, thanks to an engineer throwing a tape machine into 'record', with composer Kevan Staples playing a grand piano. The sound of footsteps heard at the beginning of the track is, in fact, Springfield walking up to the piano for what she thought was just a rehearsal.

== Release ==
In the aftermath of the disco backlash and its ensuing dramatic drop in record sales worldwide, Springfield's American label United Artists Records was bought out. 20th Century Fox Records took on the project, but by the time that the album was completed and ready for release, 20th Century Fox had in turn been sold, bought by the US arm of the PolyGram conglomerate. The release date was postponed for another six months and when White Heat finally came out, it had been relegated to the re-activated Casablanca Records, a label closely associated with disco, which in the year of 1982 didn't improve its chances of sales. Springfield later stated that she was surprised that the album came out at all: "Every time I made an album, the company I'd made it for would be swallowed up. They'd fire everyone that you'd worked with and the enthusiasm would disappear with them. Then I had to fire the original producer because he had put half the budget up his nose... there was a point where I began to feel that I was just some company's tax loss."

The British subsidiary of Polygram, a label the singer had been connected with for 25 years in various forms, declined its option to release the album in the UK; fans of Springfield's in her native country consequently had to buy import copies from the US and Canada.

White Heat in its entirety was first issued in the UK in 2002 when it was released on CD by Mercury/Universal Music.

== Reception ==
Professional ratings
Review scores
Source	Rating
AllMusic	3/5 stars

Reviewing the album in Record, Barry Alfonso commented, "Springfield's now stepped away from her earlier MOR approach and headed in a Grace Jones pop/funk direction. The results are uneven, but encouraging nonetheless." He elaborated that Springfield's sensual approach to songs like "I Am Curious" and "I Don't Think We Could Ever Be Friends" was perfect, while she mishandled ballads such as "Losing You" by taking a modern approach to them instead of the emotional thrust that was her trademark sound.

== Track listing ==
Side A

1. "Donnez Moi (Give It to Me)" (Jean-Alain Roussel, Paul Northfield, Luc Plamondon, Christiane Robichaud) – 3:55
2. "I Don't Think We Could Ever Be Friends" (Jean-Alain Roussel, Sting) – 3:28
3. "Blind Sheep" (Daniel Ironstone, Tommy Faragher, Dusty Springfield, Mary Unobsky) – 4:31
4. "Don't Call It Love" (Dean Pitchford, Tom Snow) – 3:31
5. "Time and Time Again" (Robbie Buchanan, Jay Gruska) – 3:43

Side B

1. "I Am Curious" (Carole Pope, Kevan Staples) – 4:09
2. "Sooner or Later" (Tommy Faragher, Daniel Ironstone) – 4:21
3. "Losing You (Just a Memory)" (Elvis Costello) – 2:51
4. "Gotta Get Used to You" (Jean-Alain Roussel) – 3:56
5. "Soft Core" (Carole Pope, Kevan Staples) – 3:13

== Personnel ==
- Dusty Springfield – lead vocals, background vocals
- Max Gronenthal – background vocals
- Eddy Keating – background vocals
- John Townsend – background vocals
- Danny Ironstone – background vocals
- Barbara Busa Cilla – background vocals
- George Nauful – guitar
- David Plehn – guitar
- Jean Roussel – synthesizer, piano
- Robbie Buchanan – piano, Fender Rhodes electric piano
- Tommy Faragher – synthesizer, percussion, background vocals, Wurlitzer electric piano, Casio
- Nicky Hopkins – piano
- James Newton Howard – Prophet-5 synthesizer, string arrangements
- Caleb Quaye – synthesizer, bass, guitar, Wurlitzer electric piano, Minimoog
- Kevan Staples – piano, guitar, Minimoog
- Steve Sykes – guitar, Wurlitzer electric piano, Minimoog
- Nathan East – bass guitar
- Davey Faragher – bass
- Marlo Henderson – bass
- Mark Leonard – bass
- Kenny Lee Lewis – bass
- André Fischer – drums
- Gary Mallaber – drums "Blind Sheep"
- Casey Scheuerell – drums
- Linn Drums – drums
- Steve Zaretsky – percussion

=== Production ===
- Dusty Springfield – record producer
- Howard Steele – producer, engineer, mixing
- André Fischer – producer
- Jackie Krost – executive producer
- Steve Zaretsky – assistant engineer
- Lindy Griffin – assistant engineer
- Philip Moores – assistant engineer
- Nick DeCaro – arranger, conductor
- Karen Chamberlain – assistant engineer
- Les D. Cooper – assistant engineer
- Debra Courier – production assistant
- Glen Christensen – art direction
- Bret Lopez – photography
- Mac James – paintings

== Sources ==
- Howes, Paul (2001). The Complete Dusty Springfield. London: Reynolds & Hearn Ltd. ISBN 1-903111-24-2.
- O'Brien, Lucy (1988, 2000): Dusty. London: Pan Books Ltd. ISBN 978-0-330-39343-0.
- Official site Jean-Alain Roussel
