= It's Unbelievable =

1961 single

Single by The Larks
- B-side: "I Can't Believe"
- Released: 1961
- Genre: Doo wop
- Label: Sheryl Records Inc. 334
- Songwriter(s): Schulman, Gordon
- Producer(s): Jerry Ross, Murray Wecht

The Larks singles chronology
| "It's Unbelievable" | "Heaven Only Knows" |

"It's Unbelievable" was a hit for Philadelphia doo wop group The Larks in 1961. It became very popular in Philly as well as become a hit in the pop charts.

== Background ==
The chance to record the song came about as a result of Weldon McDougal running into Atlantic Records promo man Jerry Ross. After the auditioning for Ross, the Larks recorded around six tracks. In 1961, "It's Unbelievable" was released on the Sheryl label in 1961. The group appeared on American Bandstand to sing their song courtesy of Jerry Ross arranging their appearance.

=== Backing group ===
The group that played on the recording were called The Manhattans. They consisted of drummer Norman Conners, sax player Harrison Scott, guitarist Johnny Stiles, and keyboardist Ruben Wright. Wright was formerly with Philadelphia group The Capris and had written their hit God Only Knows.

== Chart performance ==
In 1961, the song peaked at No. 69 on the Billboard pop chart.

== Releases ==
45 RPM Singles U.S. release unless specified otherwise
| Title | Release info | Year | Notes |
|---|---|---|---|
| "It's Unbelievable" / "I Can't Believe It" | Sheryl Records Inc. 334 | 1961 | |
| "It's Unbelievable" / "I Can't Believe It" | Barry B-3031X | 1961 | Canada |
| "Keep Climbing Brothers" / "It's Unbelievable" | Uptown 761 | 1968 | Credited to Four Larks |
| "It's Unbelievable" / "There Is A Girl" | Eric Records 102 | 1968 | |
| "It's Unbelievable" / "I Can't Believe It" | Collectables C1080 | | |
