= Love Shine Down =

Love Shine Down may refer to:

- "Love Shine Down", a song recorded by Dusty Springfield in 1969, released as a bonus track on the Dusty in Memphis Deluxe Edition in 1999
- "Love Shine Down", a 2010 song by Olly Murs, (featuring Jessie J) from Olly Murs
- "Love Shine Down", a 2015 song by Dusty Springfield from Faithful
- "Love Shine Down", a 2016 song by Shaun Escoffery from Evergreen
- "Love Shine Down", a 2021 song by Eric Church from Heart & Soul
