= The Four Larks (Philadelphia group) =

- Genres: Doo wop, Soul
- Years active: 1958 to 1969
- Labels: Sheryl Records Inc., Tower Records
- Past members: Cleopatra McDougal; Vivian McDougal; Weldon McDougal; Jackie Marshall; Calvin Nichols; Bill Oxendine; Joe Shamwell

The Four Larks were an R&B group that recorded from the 1960s through to the 1970s on various record labels. Their singles have been released on at least ten different record labels. They had a hit on the pop charts with "It's Unbelievable".

== Background ==
The Larks were originally started by Weldon McDougal. In 1954, with himself singing bass, and along Calvin Nichols, Mary Archer and brothers Clarence and Bill Blalock, he formed a group called The Victors. Mary Archer was soon replaced by Herman Green. By the end of the year McDougal joined the marines and had a group with the same name while in still in the marines. Having left the service in 1958, he went about reforming The Victors. The only member he could get was Calvin Nichols. He managed to bring in Jackie Marshall, a high tenor. News got out which attracted the attention of Baritone Bill Oxendine who joined up. McDougal's wife Cleopatra also joined up and the group's membership became five. He also changed the name of the group to The Larks after seeing a brand of nails called Lark.

== Career ==
In 1961, "It's Unbelievable" was released on the Sheryl label. The Sheryl released came about as a result of Weldon running into Atlantic Records promo man Jerry Ross. After the auditioning for Ross, the Larks recorded around six tracks. The backing band was called The Manhattans and was made up of keyboardist Ruben Wright, guitarist Johnny Stiles, sax player Harrison Scott and drummer Norman Conners. Wright was formerly with Philadelphia group The Capris and had written their hit God Only Knows. In 1961, it entered the charts at no 78 for the Week Ending 1 January. It eventually rose to no 69 on the Billboard pop charts.

Their last released was on the Uptown label with "Keep Climbing Brothers" bw "It's Unbelievable" in 1969.

== Later years ==
Weldon McDougal would later become a producer and work for Motown. He also has a place in history by paving the way for the Philly Sound.

== Discography ==
Singles
Credited act	Title	Release info	Year	Notes
The Larks	"It's Unbelievable" / "I Can't Believe"	Sheryl Records Inc. 334	1961	
Cleopatra	"Heaven Only Knows" / "My Darling"	Sheryl Records Inc. 335	1961	Recording by The Larks but credited to Cleopatra McDougal the then wife of Weldon McDougal.
The Larks	"Let's Drink A Toast" / "There Is A Girl"	Sheryl Records Inc. 338	1961	
Joe Hunter Charles & The Larks	"Freight Train Home" (Part 1) / "Freight Train Home" (Part 2)	Vegas 625	1962	
Irma and the Larks	"Don't Cry" / "Without You Baby"	Priority 322	1963	
Irma and The Larks	"Don't Cry" / "Without You Baby"	Fairmount 1003	1963	
The Larks	"Fabulous Cars And Diamond Rings" / "Life Is Sweeter Now"	Cross Fire 74-50 / 74-59	1964	
The Larks	"Life Is Sweeter Now" / "Fabulous Cars And Diamond Rings"	Guyden 2103	1964	
The Larks	"Another Sleepless Night" / "For The Love Of Money"	Arock 1010	1964	
Barbara Mason, Vocal Accomp.: The Tiffanys Barbara Mason, Vocal Accomp.: The Larks	"Trouble Child" "Dedicated To You"	Charger CRG-111	1964	
Barbara Mason, Vocal Accomp: The Tiffanys Barbara Mason, Vocal Accomp: The Larks	"Trouble Child" "Dedicated To You"	Crusader C-111	1964	Re-issued on Crusader CRU-114 in 1965 *
The Larks	"Love Me True" / "Love You So"	Jett 3001	1965	
Irma & the Fascinators aka Irma & the Fascinations	"Just A Feeling" / "Lost Love"	Scepter 12100	1965	Larks uncredited. From previously recorded Irma and the Larks masters
The Four Larks	"That's All That Counts" / "You And Me"	Uptown 748	1967	
The Four Larks	"Rain" / "Another Chance"	Tower 364	1968	
The Four Larks	"I Still Love You (From The Bottom Of My Heart)" / "Groovin' At The Go-Go"	Tower 402	1968	
The Four Larks	"Can I Have Another Helping Please (Of Your Love)" / "I've Got Plenty"	Tower 450	1968	
Four Larks	"Keep Climbing Brothers" / "It's Unbelievable"	Uptown 761	1968	
The Larks	"It's Unbelievable" / "There Is A Girl"	Eric Records 102	1968	
The Larks	"It's Unbelievable" / "I Can't Believe It"	Collectables C1080		
