= It Begins Again =

Album by Dusty Springfield

Studio album by Dusty Springfield
- Released: 10 February 1978 (UK); 12 February 1978 (US)
- Recorded: April–September 1977
- Studio: Cherokee Recording Studios, Los Angeles, California
- Genre: Pop, R&B
- Length: 41:08
- Label: United Artists Records; UA-LA791-H (US); Mercury Records; 9109 607 (UK)
- Producer: Roy Thomas Baker

Dusty Springfield chronology
Longing (Unreleased) (1974)	It Begins Again (1978)	Living Without Your Love (1979)

Professional ratings
Review scores
Source	Rating
AllMusic	3/5 stars
Christgau's Record Guide	B

It Begins Again is the tenth studio album recorded by Dusty Springfield and the ninth released. Recorded during the middle of 1977, It Begins Again was her first completed and released album since Cameo five years earlier. Two of the album's titles, "Turn Me Around" and "A Love Like Yours (Don't Come Knocking Every Day)", were tracks from the abandoned 1974 Longing sessions and Springfield decided to record new versions of both songs for It Begins Again, placing Chi Coltrane's "Turn Me Around" as the opening track.

== Background ==
It Begins Again, which was Springfield's debut album for the United Artists label in the US and Mercury Records in the UK, was recorded in Los Angeles and produced by Englishman Roy Thomas Baker, at the time best known for helping create the four first albums by Queen. Musically It Begins Again was however geared towards the American adult contemporary, pop and disco markets. Contributing on the album were some of the most renowned American session musicians of the era, such as Jay Graydon, Jeff Baxter, Joe Sample, Ed Greene and David Paich and it featured backing vocals by Pattie Brooks, Dianne Brooks and Brenda Russell – all acclaimed recording artists and composers in their own right. The songs on the album were also written by a number of notable composers and lyricists, among others Nona Hendryx, Lesley Gore, Ellen Weston, Dean Parks, Peter Allen and Carole Bayer Sager. Barry Manilow's "Sandra", often singled out as the highlight of the set, is a gentle piano ballad that portrays the life of a suburban housewife who minutely details her daily chores, all the while assuring both herself and the listener that "I swear I love my husband and I swear I love my kids" – yet in the last verse she reveals that she one day found herself cutting her wrists "doing the dishes, quite by mistake. It was real touch and go for a while."

Containing a diverse range of styles, It Begins Again was seen as somewhat experimental by Springfield herself, as well as music critics, who generally gave it favourable reviews. Despite the critical reception, the hopeful album title, as well as a series of promotional performances made in both the US and the UK promoting the up-tempo singles "A Love Like Yours" and "That's the Kind of Love I've Got for You", It Begins Again only briefly made the charts in Britain, peaking at No. 41, and did not chart in the US. Springfield stated that she had wanted to try something different, but felt that she now needed to move into a different style, a commercial, lightweight R&B, which resulted in the following album Living Without Your Love.

In 2002, Mercury/Universal Music UK released the album on CD for the first time, then also including Tom Moulton's extended remix of "That's the Kind of Love I've Got for You", originally only released as a promotional 12" single, which took advantage of the popularity of disco at the time. The song which was the closing track on It Begins Again was, however, the only true disco song on the album. The 12" version was somewhat popular with US deejays and the track in fact managed to reach No. 31 in the US Hot Dance Club Play chart.

When the Pet Shop Boys in 2005 released their installment in the mix album series Back to Mine, they both included a Dusty Springfield track; Neil Tennant chose "Goin' Back" – and Chris Lowe, rather surprisingly, chose the ballad "I'd Rather Leave While I'm in Love".

== Track listing ==
Side A

1. "Turn Me Around" (Chi Coltrane) – 3:28
2. "Checkmate" (Nona Hendryx) 3:23
3. "I'd Rather Leave While I'm in Love" (Peter Allen, Carole Bayer Sager) – 2:53
4. "A Love Like Yours (Don't Come Knocking Every Day)" (Lamont Dozier, Edward Holland Jr., Brian Holland) – 3:16
5. "Love Me by Name" (Lesley Gore, Ellen Weston) – 4:16

Side B

1. "Sandra" (Enoch Anderson, Barry Manilow) – 4:37
2. "I Found Love with You" (Bob Esty, Michelle Aller) – 3:18
3. "Hollywood Movie Girls" (Gaille Heideman) 3:40
4. "That's the Kind of Love I've Got for You" (Dean Parks, Donald Fletcher) – 5:00

Bonus track 2002 CD reissue

10. "That's the Kind of Love I've Got for You" (Tom Moulton Extended Mix) (Fletcher, Parks) – 7:10
  - First release: promotional 12" single, United Artists SP 178. First commercial release: 4 CD boxed set Simply Dusty, 2000

== Personnel and production ==
- Dusty Springfield – lead vocals, background vocals, production associate
- Barry Fosman – musical arranger
- Peter Matz – arranger
- Bob Esty – arranger
- Trevor Veitch – arranger
- Reginald Sonny Burke – arranger on "That's the Kind of Love I've Got for You"
- Michele Aller – background vocals
- Dianne Brooks – background vocals
- Patti Brooks – background vocals
- Brenda Russell – background vocals
- Tommy Vig – background vocals, vibraphone
- Rick Shlosser – drums
- Ed Greene – drums
- Oscar Castro-Neves – percussion
- Mr. M. – percussion
- Jeff Baxter – guitar
- Charles Fearing – guitar
- Jay Graydon – guitar
- Thom Rotella – guitar
- David T. Walker – guitar
- Keni Burke – bass guitar
- Colin Cameron – bass guitar
- Bob Glaub – bass guitar
- Chuck Rainey – bass guitar
- Joe Sample – piano, keyboards
- David Paich – piano, keyboards
- William D. "Smitty" Smith – piano, keyboards, arranger
- Jai Winding – piano, keyboards
- John Barnes – synthesizer, keyboards, electric piano, Clavinet
- Bill Payne – synthesizer, piano, electric piano, Clavinet
- Richard Tee – piano, keyboards
- Jerry Jumonville – saxophone, horn arrangements
- Sid Sharp – concert master

Technical

- Roy Thomas Baker – record producer
- Tom Moulton – remix ("That's The Kind of Love I've Got for You" Extended Mix)
- David Hines – sound engineer
- Joe Robb – engineer
- Bill Burks – art direction
- Jeanette Post – album co-ordination
- Norma Goldstein – album co-ordination
- Barry Krost – management
- Trevor Veitch – musical contractor
- Michael Childers – photography
- Recorded and Mixed at Cherokee Recording Studios, L.A.
- Mastered at Sterling Sound, N.Y.
- Produced for R.T.B. (Audio Visual) Prod. Ltd.

== Sources ==
- Howes, Paul (2001). The Complete Dusty Springfield. London: Reynolds & Hearn Ltd. ISBN 1-903111-24-2.
