= I Don't Want to Hear It Anymore =

Single by Dusty Springfield

from the album Dusty in Memphis
- B-side: "The Windmills of Your Mind"
- Released: May 1969
- Recorded: 1969
- Genre: R&B
- Length: 3:07
- Label: Atlantic; 45-2623; Philips
- Songwriter: Randy Newman
- Producers: Jerry Wexler; Arif Mardin; Tom Dowd

Dusty Springfield singles chronology
"Breakfast in Bed" (1969)	"I Don't Want to Hear It Anymore" (1969)	"Willie & Laura Mae Jones" (1969)

"I Don't Want to Hear It Anymore" is a 1964 song written by Randy Newman. It was first recorded by Jerry Butler in 1964 and released as a single by him (under the title "I Don't Want to Hear Anymore").

Writer Kevin Courrier, in his 2005 book Randy Newman's American Dreams, describes the song as about the "ambiguities of romance" with the singer the protagonist in an "ill-fated love affair".

== Dusty Springfield version ==
In April 1969 "I Don't Want to Hear It Anymore" was announced as the third A-side release from Dusty Springfield's album Dusty in Memphis with "The Windmills of Your Mind" as the B-side. The producer of Dusty in Memphis, Jerry Wexler, was prepared to promote "The Windmills of Your Mind" as the A-side if it won the Academy Award for Best Song, which it duly did. It was subsequently issued as a double-sided promo single. String arranger Arif Mardin described the background vocalists on the song as resembling a Greek chorus in their interactions with Springfield's protagonist. In his 2003 book, Dusty in Memphis, critic Warren Zanes describes the idiosyncratic songwriting of Newman as "reinforcing the backbone of the story that gives [the album] its special shape".

== Other versions ==
The Walker Brothers included a version of the song on their 1965 debut album Take It Easy with the Walker Brothers, sung by Scott Walker. Lorez Alexandria released a 7" single of the song in 1969 with "Hey Jude" as its B-side.

Melissa Manchester recorded it on her 1975 hit album Melissa. Shelby Lynne recorded the song on her 2008 tribute album to Dusty Springfield, Just a Little Lovin'.
