= I'm Walking Out On You =

Single by Ruben Wright
- B-side: "Hey Girl"
- Released: 1966
- Genre: Soul
- Label: Capitol 5588
- Songwriter(s): Ruben Wright
- Producer(s): Marvin Holtz; Arranged by: Luther Randolph

Ruben Wright singles chronology
"Where Was I" (1967)	"I'm Walking Out On You" (1966)	"Crazy Baby" (1968)

I'm Walking Out On You was an R&B Top 30 hit for Philadelphia singer Ruben Wright. It was released on the Capitol label in 1966. Wright was formerly a member of the doo wop group The Capris.

== Background ==
Wright had been with Philadelphia doo wop group The Capris in the 1950s. He was the composer of their single titled "God Only Knows".

In February 1966, "I'm Walking Out On You" was released backed with "Hey Girl". Both sides were composed by Wright. This single was one of five singles Wright had released on the Capitol label.

== Chart performance ==
By May 7, 1966, "I'm Walking Out On You" was holding its second week in the Baltimore Top 40. By May 14, it had made the National R&B Top 40, at no 37. The June 18 edition of Billboard reported his single as a Regional Breakout in New York. Its progress in the R&B chart was good with the single, spending 6 weeks on the chart, peaking at No. 29 for the week ending June 11.
