= Dusty in Memphis =

- International cover

Studio album by Dusty Springfield
- Released: 31 March 1969
- Recorded: September 1968
- Studios: American Sound, Memphis; Atlantic, New York (vocal overdubbing)
- Genres: Pop; R&B; blue-eyed soul
- Length: 32:39
- Labels: Atlantic (US); Philips (worldwide)
- Producers: Jerry Wexler; Arif Mardin; Tom Dowd

Dusty Springfield chronology
Dusty... Definitely (1968)	Dusty in Memphis (1969)	A Brand New Me (1970)

Alternative cover
- US, Canada and Australia cover (on Philips in Canada and Australia)

Dusty in Memphis is the fifth studio album by English singer Dusty Springfield, released on 31 March 1969 in the United States by Atlantic Records and by Philips Records internationally. Springfield worked on the album with a team of musicians and producers that included Jerry Wexler, Arif Mardin, Tom Dowd, conductor Gene Orloff, backing vocalists the Sweet Inspirations, bassist Tommy Cogbill, and guitarist Reggie Young. Initial sessions were recorded at American Sound Studio in Memphis, while Springfield's final vocals and the album's orchestral parts were recorded at Atlantic Records' New York City studios.

Dusty in Memphis sold poorly upon its initial release despite featuring one of Springfield's top-10 UK hits "Son of a Preacher Man". It has since been acclaimed as her best work and one of the greatest albums of all time. Music critic Robert Christgau called it "the all-time rock-era torch record" and included it in his "Basic Record Library" of 1950s and 1960s recordings, published in Christgau's Record Guide: Rock Albums of the Seventies (1981). In 2001, it was inducted into the Grammy Hall of Fame.

In 2020, the album was selected by the Library of Congress for preservation in the National Recording Registry for being "culturally, historically, or aesthetically significant". In its official press release, the library stated that despite its modest sales when first released, "over time, Dusty in Memphis grew in stature to become widely recognized as an important album by a woman in the rock era."

== Writing and recording ==
Hoping to reinvigorate her career and boost her credibility, Springfield signed with Atlantic Records, at the time the label of Aretha Franklin, one of her soul music idols. Springfield signed with Atlantic on the condition that she work with the label's chief producer and co-owner Jerry Wexler. For their initial album project, Wexler provided Springfield with dozens of song demo recordings, and the two decided on a program of 11 songs, primarily in the pop genre. Eight of the songs were composed by New York and Los Angeles-based songwriters who at the time were associated with the "Brill Building Sound". However, "Son of a Preacher Man", the album's best-known track, was not among these, and it was written with the idea of submitting it to Aretha Franklin. (Franklin cut her own version of the song in 1969 after Springfield's single reached the #10 position in the Billboard Hot 100.) "Preacher Man" was musically and thematically closer to classic Southern soul as was "Breakfast in Bed". Farthest from the soul genre on the album was Michel Legrand's "The Windmills of Your Mind", which Springfield resisted and Wexler insisted she do. Wexler's and Springfield's idea for the album was to record the pop compositions with Southern soul's rhythmic feel, a combination that other producers had tried successfully at American Sound Studios with acts like The Box Tops and Merrilee Rush.

The Memphis sessions were supervised by Wexler, fellow Atlantic producer Arif Mardin, and Atlantic engineer Tom Dowd. Performing with Springfield were back-up singers the Sweet Inspirations and members of an informal group of American Sound Studios studio musicians known as the Memphis Boys, which included guitarist Reggie Young and bassist Tommy Cogbill. In addition to their pop session work, The Memphis Boys had previously backed soul musicians Wilson Pickett, Joe Tex, Bobby Womack, and King Curtis. Recording engineer Terry Manning, who was hired on assignment to write a piece on the sessions for the New Musical Express, attended and ended up assisting Dowd, along with Ed Kollis. The songs were written by Gerry Goffin and Carole King, Barry Mann and Cynthia Weil, Randy Newman, and Burt Bacharach and Hal David.

The recording was a challenge for Wexler. In his book Rhythm and the Blues, Wexler wrote that out of all the songs that were initially submitted to Springfield for consideration, "she approved exactly zero." For her, he continued, "to say yes to one song was seen as a lifetime commitment." Springfield disputed this, saying she did choose two: "Son of a Preacher Man" and "Just a Little Lovin'". Wexler was surprised, given Dusty's talent, by her apparent insecurity. Springfield later attributed her initial unease to a very real anxiety about being compared with the soul greats who had recorded in the same studios. Eventually Dusty's final vocals were recorded in New York. Additionally, Springfield stated that she had never before worked with just a rhythm track, and that it was the first time she had worked with outside producers, having self-produced her previous recordings (something for which she never took credit).

During the Memphis sessions in November 1968, Springfield suggested to the heads of Atlantic Records that they should sign the newly formed Led Zeppelin group. She knew John Paul Jones, who had backed her in concerts. Without having ever seen them and largely on Springfield's advice, the record company signed the group with a $143,000 advance.

== Music ==
Jillian Mapes of Pitchfork assessed: "Springfield had a dreamier approach to cinematic soul, one that allowed her to extol the benefits of morning sex and lament the loneliness of lurid affairs while still appealing to an easy-listening crowd. Though she may have doubted her ability to compete with the emotional depths plumbed by her black peers, what she created in their model was a perspective all her own."

== Release and reception ==
Retrospective professional ratings
Review scores
Source	Rating
AllMusic	5/5 stars
The Encyclopedia of Popular Music	5/5 stars
Entertainment Weekly	A
Music Story	5/5 stars
MusicHound Rock	4/5 stars
Q	3/5 stars
Rolling Stone	4/5 stars
The Rolling Stone Album Guide	5/5 stars
Uncut	5/5 stars

Dusty in Memphis was released by Atlantic Records in March 1969 in the United States and on 18 April by Philips Records in the United Kingdom. The album was a commercial failure in both countries, reaching only number 99 on the American album charts and failing to chart altogether on the British Top 40. According to music journalist Peter Robinson, its failure stalled Springfield's career instead of reviving it, although the record eventually became "a pop culture milestone [and] timeless emotional reference point" for listeners who discovered it in second-hand shops or purchased one of its several reissues years later. Robert Christgau called it "a pop standard and classic", predicting in his 1973 column for Newsday it would be "the kind of record that will sell for years because its admirers need replacement copies, and it is the perfect instance of how a production team should work." Greil Marcus was less enthusiastic in Rolling Stone, deeming some of the songwriting inconsistent on what was "a real drifting, cool, smart, sexually distracted soul album".

Despite modest sales (the platter has sold 216,000 in the United States in the SoundScan era, per Luminate Entertainment Data) it was the first of a small wave of "in Memphis"-style albums that were recorded by pop singers at American Recording Studios. Three months after Springfield's album was released, Dionne Warwick's Soulful album was released, which had a similar mix of soul and pop and was recorded at American. In the summer of 1969, Elvis Presley's From Elvis in Memphis was released, featuring Presley recording at American with The Memphis Boys musicians. The following year, Petula Clark's Memphis album, also recorded at American, was released. These albums were all part of a larger 1960s and 1970s boom of soul and pop music production in Memphis (home to Stax Records, Hi Records, and other studios and labels), and nearby Muscle Shoals, Alabama.

Dusty in Memphis has been named one of the greatest albums of all time. NME named it the 54th greatest album ever in their 1993 list, and it was voted number 171 in the third edition of Colin Larkin's All Time Top 1000 Albums (2000). In 2003, Rolling Stone ranked the record 89th on the magazine's list of the 500 greatest albums of all time, a rating which the album maintained in a 2012 revised list, before rising to number 83 in a 2020 reboot of the list. According to Richie Unterberger of AllMusic, the album's reputation has improved significantly over time as the music is "deserving of its classic status". Tony Scherman from Entertainment Weekly wrote Dusty in Memphis is a "pure gem", Springfield's greatest work, and perhaps one of the great pop records recorded. Q took note of its balance between "R&B and sensitive pop dramas", and Spin critic Chuck Eddy viewed it as one of the all-important blue-eyed soul records. In The A.V. Club, Keith Phipps wrote that Springfield and her team of musicians and producers for Dusty in Memphis developed an elegant and distinct fusion of pop and R&B that predated the Philadelphia soul sound of the 1970s. According to Eric Klinger from PopMatters, its sophisticated style of music influenced the sound of 1990s trip hop artists who sampled songs from the album and became a blueprint for British female singers of the 2000s, including Adele, Amy Winehouse, Duffy, Joss Stone, Paloma Faith and Rumer.

== Track listing ==
Side One
No.	Title	Writer(s)	Length
1.	"Just a Little Lovin'"	Barry Mann, Cynthia Weil	2:18
2.	"So Much Love"	Gerry Goffin, Carole King	3:29
3.	"Son of a Preacher Man"	John Hurley, Ronnie Wilkins	2:27
4.	"I Don't Want to Hear It Anymore"	Randy Newman	3:07
5.	"Don't Forget About Me"	Goffin, King	2:49
6.	"Breakfast in Bed"	Eddie Hinton, Donnie Fritts	2:55
Total length:			16:51

Side Two
No.	Title	Writer(s)	Length
7.	"Just One Smile"	Newman	2:39
8.	"The Windmills of Your Mind"	Alan and Marilyn Bergman, Michel Legrand	3:49
9.	"In the Land of Make Believe"	Burt Bacharach, Hal David	2:30
10.	"No Easy Way Down"	Goffin, King	3:09
11.	"I Can't Make It Alone"	Goffin, King	3:59
Total length:			15:48

== CD reissues ==
Dusty in Memphis was first released on compact disc by Philips Records/PolyGram and re-released in the UK/Europe in 1988. The second CD release was issued by Rhino Records (at the time independent, licensed from Atlantic) in the US in 1992, and included three bonus tracks. A Deluxe Edition with 14 bonus tracks, again released by Rhino (now a sublabel of Warner Music), followed in 1999. A fourth 24-bit digitally remastered CD with a third set of bonus tracks was issued by Mercury Records/Universal Music in the UK/Europe in 2002.

Among the additional materials featured on these re-releases are recordings from the Atlantic Records archives; outtakes and alternate mixes from the Dusty in Memphis sessions, two tracks from a cancelled second album with Jerry Wexler recorded in 1969, tracks from a shelved second album with Gamble & Huff recorded in 1970 (following A Brand New Me/From Dusty...With Love) and the intended Faithful album produced by Jeff Barry in 1971, which came to be Springfield's final recordings for the Atlantic label. The completed Faithful album was however left unreleased when its pilot singles "Haunted" and "I Believe in You" failed to perform. With the exception of a mono mix of the title track "I'll Be Faithful" all master tapes for this album were later destroyed in a fire – along with Springfield's unreleased recording of Bee Gees' "To Love Somebody" from the follow-up sessions with Wexler – but Jeff Barry had kept reference copies of the intended final mixes and these were digitally remastered and first released as part of Rhino's Deluxe Edition of Dusty in Memphis in 1999.

Bonus tracks 1992 re-issue, Rhino Records US

12. "Willie & Laura Mae Jones" (Tony Joe White) – 2:48
  - From cancelled second album with Jerry Wexler. First release: US Atlantic single #2647 (A-side), 5 June 1969. First UK release: album See All Her Faces, 1972.
13. "That Old Sweet Roll (Hi-De-Ho)" (Gerry Goffin, Carole King) – 2:59
  - From cancelled second album with Jerry Wexler. First release: US Atlantic single #2647 (B-side of "Willie & Laura Mae Jones"). First UK release: album See All Her Faces, 1972.
14. "What Do You Do When Love Dies" (without orchestral overdubs) (Mary Unobsky, Donna Weiss) – 2:43
  - Outtake from the Dusty in Memphis sessions. Recording date: September 1968. First release (with orchestral overdubs): US Atlantic single #2771 (B-side of "What Good Is I Love You?"), 12 January 1971. First UK release: album Dusty in Memphis Plus, 1980.
- Tracks 12 & 13: recorded at Groove Sound Studio, New York, May 1969. Producers: Jerry Wexler, Tom Dowd & Arif Mardin.
- Track 14: recorded at American Studio, Memphis. Dusty Springfield's final vocals recorded in New York. Producers: Jerry Wexler, Tom Dowd & Arif Mardin.

Bonus tracks 1999 Deluxe Edition, Rhino Records US

12. "What Do You Do When Love Dies" (without orchestral overdubs) (Mary Unobsky, Donna Weiss) – 2:42
13. "Willie & Laura Mae Jones" (Tony Joe White) – 2:49
14. "That Old Sweet Roll (Hi-De-Ho)" (Gerry Goffin, Carole King) – 2:59
15. "Cherished" (Kenny Gamble, Leon Huff) – 2:38
16. "Goodbye" (Roland Chambers, Leonard Pakula) – 2:33
  - First UK release: compilation Classics And Collectables, 2007
17. "Make It with You" (David Gates) – 3:12
  - First UK release: 4 CD boxed set Simply Dusty, 2000
18. "Love Shine Down" (Neil Brian Goldberg, Gilbert Slavin [not credited]) – 2:22
  - First UK release: compilation Classics And Collectables, 2007
19. "Live Here With You" (Gilbert Slavin, Michael F. Soles) – 2:44
  - First UK release: 4 CD boxed set Simply Dusty, 2000
20. "Natchez Trace" (Neil Brian Goldberg, Gilbert Slavin) – 2:58
  - First UK release: compilation Classics And Collectables, 2007
21. "All the King's Horses" (Neil Brian Goldberg, Joe Renzetti [not credited]) – 3:10
22. "I'll Be Faithful" (Stereo) (Ned W. Albright, Michael F. Soles, Steven Soles) – 3:01
  - First release (mono): Rhino's 1992 re-issue of A Brand New Me. First UK release: compilation Classics And Collectables, 2007
23. "Have a Good Life Baby" (Neil Brian Goldberg, Joe Renzetti [not credited]) – 3:09
  - First UK release: 2002 re-issue of See All Her Faces
24. "You've Got a Friend" (Carole King) – 5:28
  - First UK release: 4 CD boxed set Simply Dusty, 2000
25. "I Found My Way" a.k.a. "I Found My Way Through The Darkness" (Gilbert Slavin, Michael F. Soles) – 3:12
  - First UK release: compilation Classics And Collectables, 2007
- Tracks 15–16: originally unissued. Recorded at Sigma Sound Studios, Philadelphia, February 1970. Producers: Gamble-Huff Productions. Arranged by Thom Bell.
- Tracks 17–25: originally unissued. Recorded at Century Sound Studio, New York, January–June 1971. Producer: Jeff Barry.

Bonus tracks 2002 re-issue, Mercury Records UK

12. "Son of a Preacher Man" (Hurley, Wilkins) – 2:29
13. "Just a Little Lovin'" (Mann, Weil) – 2:19
14. "Don't Forget About Me" (Goffin, King) – 2:50
15. "Breakfast in Bed" (Fritts, Hinton) – 2:56
16. "I Don't Want to Hear It Anymore" (Newman) – 3:11
17. "The Windmills of Your Mind" (Bergman, Bergman, Legrand) – 3:52
18. "In the Land of Make Believe" (Bacharach, David) – 2:32
19. "So Much Love" (Goffin, King) – 3:32
- All tracks: original mono mixes.

== Personnel ==
Original LP

- Dusty Springfield – vocals
- Arif Mardin – producer, arranger, strings arranger, horns arranger
- Tom Dowd – producer, arranger, horns arranger, audio engineer
- Jerry Wexler – producer
- Gene Orloff – conductor, arranger
- The Sweet Inspirations – backing vocals
- Reggie Young – guitar, electric sitar
- Tommy Cogbill – bass guitar, guitar on "Don't Forget About Me"
- Bobby Emmons – organ, electric piano, congas on "The Windmills of Your Mind"
- Bobby Wood – acoustic piano
- Gene Chrisman – drums
- Mike Leech – congas on "Don't Forget About Me" and "In the Land of Make Believe"
- Terry Manning – assistant engineer
- Ed Kollis – harmonica
- David Redfern – photography

1992 reissue

- Dan Hersch – remastering
- Bill Inglot – remastering
- Jim Feldman – liner notes
- Haig Adishian – cover design
- Deborah Frost – project assistant

1999 reissue

- Jeff Barry – producer (relates to bonus materials)
- Thom Bell – arranger (relates to bonus materials)
- Jim Pierson – compilation producer, liner notes
- Dan Hersch – remastering
- Jim Feldman – liner notes
- Haig Adishian – design
- Rachel Gutek – reissue design

2002 reissue

- Gary Moore – liner notes, digital remastering
- Stanley Booth – liner notes
- Elvis Costello – liner notes
- Jerry Wexler – liner notes
- Tom Dowd – liner notes
- Arif Mardin – liner notes
- Paul Howes – liner notes

== Charts ==
Chart (1969)	Peak position
US Billboard 200	99
New Musical Express	14

== Certifications ==
Region	Certification	Certified units/sales
New Zealand (RMNZ)	Gold	7,500^{‡}
United Kingdom (BPI) 2002 release	Gold	100,000^{‡}
^{‡} Sales+streaming figures based on certification alone.
