= Longing (Dusty Springfield album) =

Studio album by Dusty Springfield
- Released: 6 June 2025
- Recorded: July – September 1974
- Studio: 914 Sound Studios, Blauvelt, New York
- Genre: Pop; R&B
- Length: 32:34
- Label: Real Gone Music (recorded for ABC Dunhill)
- Producer: Brooks Arthur

Dusty Springfield chronology
Faithful (2015)	Longing (2025)

Alternative cover
- Original 1974 album cover

Longing is the ninth album recorded by Dusty Springfield. It was originally slated as her second LP for the ABC Dunhill Records label. The songs for the album were originally recorded in 1974, but plans to release the album were abandoned. Most of the Longing recordings were mixed and released much later on the compilations Simply Dusty (2000) and Beautiful Soul: The ABC Dunhill Collection (2001). In June 2025, Longing received an official standalone release, over 50 years after it was recorded, making it the second posthumous Dusty Springfield album. (Faithful was the first, released in 2015.) The 2025 release includes extensive liner notes by Springfield expert Paul Howes.

As was the case with many of Springfield's albums released and/or recorded in the '70s, Longing, though unreleased at the time, contained some of Springfield's most critically acclaimed work. The track "In the Winter", written and also recorded by Janis Ian, is often singled out from the recording sessions as an example. Ian said that after hearing Springfield sing the song she (Ian) could "no longer do the piece justice" herself. Melissa Manchester has also been quoted as saying she was "over the moon" upon hearing Springfield sing her song "Home to Myself" during the recording session, on which Manchester also played the piano.

== Writing and recording ==
Longing was recorded in Blauvelt, New York and produced by Brooks Arthur, best known for his work as a sound engineer for Phil Spector and Bert Berns through most of the 1960s and later as a composer and producer in his own right for among others Neil Diamond, Bette Midler, Van Morrison and Janis Ian. Elements was the working title of the album, but it was re-titled and advertised as Longing in the music press near the end of 1974 and had at that stage also officially been given a catalogue number: DSD-50186. Springfield complained in interviews later in the seventies that some producers of her previous album, Cameo, had not even asked: "what key I wanted to sing in". Not used to being so uninvolved in her own work (owing partly to her own reported perfectionist tendencies), suffering from self-esteem issues due to her rapidly declining career, and enduring problems with substance abuse, Springfield abandoned the Longing album altogether late in the year.

The only track from the Longing sessions to be given an official release in the 1970s was "I Am Your Child", though only the instrumental track (featuring the song's writer, Barry Manilow) was used; Springfield recorded new lead vocals over the original backing track and the song was released as the B-side of her 1977 US single "Let Me Love You Once Before You Go" on the United Artists label. In 1980 the re-recorded version was in turn issued as the B-side of the Philips Records UK single "Your Love Still Brings Me to My Knees" and "I Am Your Child" subsequently found its way onto the compilation album Love Songs released by Phonogram in Europe in the late 1980s. The song is also of special significance in the history of Manilow's own career as he claims it is the first song he ever wrote.

When Springfield, after a time in her life often described as her 'wilderness years', returned to the music scene for the recording of the 1978 album It Begins Again with fellow Briton Roy Thomas Baker she re-recorded two further tracks originally included in the Longing set; the Motown classic "A Love Like Yours (Don't Come Knocking Everyday)" and Chi Coltrane's "Turn Me Around", both with slightly updated and different arrangements.

== Release ==
The year 2000 saw the debut of three original recordings from the Longing sessions; Janis Ian's "In the Winter", Melissa Manchester and Carole Bayer Sager's "Home to Myself" and Colin Blunstone and David Jones' "Exclusively for Me", all of which had been mixed and digitally remastered as early as 1995. These three titles were finally released as part of Mercury/Universal Music UK's 4 CD boxed set Simply Dusty, a project which was commissioned with Springfield's full approval before her death in 1999.

In 2001 Universal Music's American sublabel Hip-O Records released the compilation Beautiful Soul: The ABC Dunhill Collection containing nine of the ten titles intended to be used on Longing, including the original versions of "I Am Your Child", "A Love Like Yours (Don't Come Knocking Every Day)" and "Turn Me Around", as well as all tracks from her 1973 ABC Dunhill album Cameo.

Some of the Longing tracks feature incomplete or 'practice' vocals, the only existing recorded vocals, to enable a release of the album in any form; the track "Corner of the Sky" being the best example. Springfield completed some vocals on the track, but never sang a whole verse. Thus, it was the only track not included in the Beautiful Soul set as it was too incomplete to arrange any sort of commercial release. It was however completed and released in 2007 after fellow British singer Petula Clark added her own vocals and released the song as a duet on her album Duets.

Longing was released as a standalone album on 6 June 2025 by Real Gone Music, on CD, and on regular and limited-edition vinyl.

== Track listing ==
No.	Title	Writer(s)	First official release	Length
1.	"Turn Me Around"	Chi Coltrane	Beautiful Soul: The ABC Dunhill Collection	4:11
2.	"In the Winter"	Janis Ian	Simply Dusty	3:03
3.	"Exclusively for Me"	David Jones, Colin Blunstone	Simply Dusty	2:42
4.	"A Love Like Yours"	Lamont Dozier, Edward Holland Jr., Brian Holland	Beautiful Soul: The ABC Dunhill Collection	3:42
5.	"I Am Your Child"	Barry Manilow, Marty Panzer	Beautiful Soul: The ABC Dunhill Collection	2:42
6.	"Home to Myself"	Melissa Manchester, Carole Bayer Sager	Simply Dusty	2:49
7.	"Make the Man Love Me"	Barry Mann, Cynthia Weil	Beautiful Soul: The ABC Dunhill Collection	3:31
8.	"Beautiful Soul"	Margie Adam	Beautiful Soul: The ABC Dunhill Collection	2:57
9.	"Angels"	Arthur Resnick, Christie Thompson	Beautiful Soul: The ABC Dunhill Collection	3:25
10.	"Corner of the Sky"	Stephen Schwartz	Solo version previously unreleased	3:32

== Personnel and production ==
- Dusty Springfield – vocals, background vocals
- Brooks Arthur – record producer, audio engineer
- Larry Alexander – assistant engineer
- Ron Frangiapane – musical arranger, keyboards
- Garry Sherman – arranger, keyboards
- Renee Armand – background vocals
- Gail Kantor – background vocals
- Merle Miller – background vocals
- Judy Thomas- background vocals
- Christie Thompson – background vocals
- Maretha Stewart – background vocals
- Rita – background vocals
- Steve Gadd - drums
- Gary Chester – drums
- Jimmy Johnson – drums
- Bernard Purdie – drums
- Barry Lazarowitz – drums
- Ralph MacDonald – percussion
- Joe Venuto – percussion
- Al Gorgoni – guitar
- Cornell Dupree – guitar
- Hugh McCracken – guitar
- David Snyder – guitar
- John Tropea – guitar
- Russell George – bass guitar
- Gordon Edwards – bass
- Stephen Schwartz – keyboards
- Frank Owens – keyboards
- Joe d'Elia – keyboards
- Richard Tee – keyboards
- Paul Griffin – keyboards
- Melissa Manchester – keyboards, background vocals, liner notes (Beautiful Soul: The ABC Dunhill Collection)
- Barry Manilow – keyboards, liner notes (Beautiful Soul: The ABC Dunhill Collection)
- Artie Kaplan – music contractor
- Ben Mitchell – digital remastering, mixing (Simply Dusty)
- Paul Howes – digital remastering, mixing (Simply Dusty)
- Tony Heester – digital remastering, mixing (Simply Dusty)
- Janis Ian – liner notes (Simply Dusty)
- Kevin Reeves – mixing (Beautiful Soul: The ABC Dunhill Collection)
- Dan Hersch – digital remastering (Beautiful Soul: The ABC Dunhill Collection)
- Jim Pierson – liner notes, compilation producer (Beautiful Soul: The ABC Dunhill Collection)
- Pat Lawrence – executive producer (Beautiful Soul: The ABC Dunhill Collection)
- Michele Horie – project coordinator (Beautiful Soul: The ABC Dunhill Collection)
- Dana Smart – project coordinator (Beautiful Soul: The ABC Dunhill Collection)
