= Ruben Wright =

American musician

- Also known as: Reuben Wright
- Born: c.1937 Philadelphia, Pennsylvania, United States
- Origin: Philadelphia, Pennsylvania, United States
- Genres: Doo Wop, Soul, Pop
- Instrument: Piano
- Years active: 1953 - 2000s - ?
- Label: Capitol,
- Formerly of: The Uniques, The Capris, The Larks, The Manhattans

Ruben Wright (born 1937/8) is a musician and former bandleader from Philadelphia. He had an R&B Top 30 hit with "I'm Walking Out On You". He is also a songwriter. He also wrote the regional hit "God Only Knows" for The Capris in 1954.

== Background ==
Wright was a member of an early 1950s group called The Uniques, in which he played piano. All of the members came from the same neighborhood. The group later evolved into the Capris. At that time the group's ages ranged from 15 to 16. In June 1954, the group was signed to Gotham Records, and recorded the Wright-penned "God Only Knows", featuring female singer Renee Hinton on lead. The Capris broke up after their final single in 1958, and Wright began his solo career.

== Career ==
The single "Girls Make Me Nervous" bw "Love Is Gone" was released on the Wynne label in 1958. The B side "Love Is Gone" was composed by Eddie Warner and it has been suggested that some of the backing singers were members of The Capris. His next single "To You" bw "Bye Bye" was released on the Lancer label.

In the early 1960s, he was a member of a backing group called The Manhattans. They backed a group called The Larks on the single "It's Unbelievable" bw "I Can't Believe It" which was released on the Sheryl label.

Wright recorded 5 singles for the Capitol label, beginning with "Where Was I" bw "Bye Bye" in 1964. In 1966, "I'm Walking Out On You" was released bw "Hey Girl". By May the 7th that year, "I'm Walking Out On You" was holding its second week in the Baltimore Top 40. By May 14, it had made the National R&B Top 40, and was at no 37. The June 18 edition of Billboard reported his single as a Regional Breakout in New York. However, its progress in the R&B Charts was doing well with the single, spending 6 weeks there, having made it to no 29 the previous week.

In February 1967, Billboard reported that his Capitol single "I'll Be There" was predicted to reach the R&B Singles Chart. He composed "That's All That Counts" for The Four Larks which was released on the Uptown label that year.

His last single released was "I'm Gonna Have My Day" bw "La La La" on the Virtue label.

== Discography ==
45 RPM Singles
Title	Release info	Year	Notes
"Girls Make Me Nervous" / "Love Is Gone"	Wynne 119	1958	
"To You" / "Bye Bye"	Lancer 101	1959	
"Where Was I" / "Bye Bye"	Capitol 5317	1964	
"I'm Walking Out On You" / "Hey Girl"	Capitol 5588	1966	
"Crazy Baby" / "Everybody Needs Somebody"	Capitol 5686	1966	
"You've Done Me Wrong" / "I'll Be There"	Capitol 5835	1967	
"Let Me Go Lover" / "When The World Is Ready"	Capitol 2045	1967	
"I'm Gonna Have My Day" / "La La La"	Virtue 2505	circa 1969	
