= Sigma Sound Studios =

Former recording studios in Philadelphia and New York City

Coordinates: 39.95605°N 75.15905°W

- Sigma Sound Studios in 1979
- Industry: Recording studio
- Founded: Philadelphia, Pennsylvania, U.S. (1968)
- Founder: Joseph Tarsia
- Defunct: 2014
- Fate: Closed
- Headquarters: Philadelphia, Pennsylvania, U.S.
- Number of locations: 2

Sigma Sound Studios was an American independent recording studio in Philadelphia, Pennsylvania, founded in 1968 by recording engineer Joseph Tarsia. Located at 212 North 12th Street in Philadelphia, Sigma Sound is closely associated with Philadelphia soul, and was the location of numerous recordings of Gamble and Huff's Philadelphia International Records, the group of session musicians known as MFSB, and producer Thom Bell.

Sigma Sound is credited with over 200 gold and platinum awards with a client list that includes Harold Melvin & the Blue Notes, The O'Jays, The Spinners, MFSB, David Bowie, Teddy Pendergrass, Patti LaBelle, The Jacksons, The Roots and others.

From 1977 through 1988, the studios also operated a New York City location in the Ed Sullivan Theater building, which hosted recording projects by artists including Talking Heads, Madonna, the Ramones, Aretha Franklin, and the B-52s.

== History ==
=== Background ===
In fall of 1967, Joseph Tarsia, who had worked as a service technician for various Philadelphia recording studios before becoming chief engineer at Cameo-Parkway Studios, leveraged all of his assets to secure a $40,000 loan, which he used to lease 212 North 12th Street in Philadelphia in a location formerly occupied by Emil Corson's Rec-O-Art Studios. Rec-O-Art was a mono-only recording facility with a 40-foot long room and a 6x12x40 foot echo chamber where Tarsia had previously done service technician work.

=== Sigma Sound Philadelphia ===
Tarsia opened his new recording studio, renamed Sigma Sound, in August 1968, hosting sessions for Gamble and Huff, Weldon McDougal, and The Delfonics on the first day. From the beginning, Sigma Sound was strongly associated with Philadelphia soul and, in the 1970s, the sound of Gamble and Huff's Philadelphia International Records (PIR), as well as the classic, sophisticated productions of Thom Bell, hosting recording sessions for PIR acts and others.

More than 30 resident session musicians, known collectively as MFSB ("Mother Father Sister Brother"), were based at this studio and backed up most of the recordings. Some of the musicians also acted as arrangers, writers, or producers for Philadelphia International as well as for other labels recording in the city. They included Bobby Martin, Norman Harris, Thom Bell, Ronnie Baker, Vince Montana and, later, Jack Faith, Dexter Wansel, and John Usry.

The studios' large productions with strings and horns became known as "The Sound of Philadelphia," or "T.S.O.P.", a term which became trademarked. In 1972, MFSB began recording as a named act for the Philadelphia International Label, and recorded the theme for the American musical TV show Soul Train at Sigma Sound. The song, "TSOP (The Sound of Philadelphia)", was the first television theme song to reach No. 1 on the Billboard Hot 100.

In 1969 Dusty Springfield recorded A Brand New Me and its hit title track at Sigma Sound. The following year, Wilson Pickett teamed up with Gamble and Huff at Sigma Sound for Wilson Pickett in Philadelphia and two of Pickett's most popular singles from the early 1970s - "Engine No. 9" and "Don't Let the Green Grass Fool You". In 1971 Harry Chipetz, former general manager of Cameo-Parkway, joined Sigma as general manager. The same year, Laura Nyro and Labelle recorded Gonna Take a Miracle at the studio. On April 15, 1972, singer-songwriter and pianist Billy Joel and his touring band played an hour-long concert at Sigma Studios. The recording of "Captain Jack" from this event received extensive radio play in the Philadelphia area, long before Joel became widely known, which helped him establish a national following.

In 1972, the O'Jays recorded their breakthrough album Back Stabbers at Sigma Sound, along with its hit single "Love Train", one of the first disco songs. The same year, Billy Paul recorded his best-selling hit song "Me and Mrs. Jones" at the studio. Other artists who experienced commercial success working with Gamble and Huff, Philadelphia International, and Sigma Sound Studios included Harold Melvin & the Blue Notes, The Spinners, and Teddy Pendergrass.

In 1974, David Bowie visited Sigma Sound Studios to work on recordings with Ava Cherry, and returned to Sigma Sound for the initial recording sessions for his 1975 album Young Americans. Local fans, whom Bowie referred to as the "Sigma Kids", waited outside the studio over the course of the sessions. On the final day of tracking, these fans were invited into the studio to listen to rough versions of the new songs.

In 1976, Lou Rawls recorded his first album for PIR at Sigma Sound, All Things in Time, including Rawls' most successful single, "You'll Never Find Another Love Like Mine". The same year, following their tenure at Motown as "the Jackson 5", the Jacksons recorded their self-titled 1976 album and their subsequent album, Goin' Places, at the studios.

In 1979, Tarsia purchased the former United Artists screening room and studio at 13th and Vine Streets in Philadelphia, which Sigma converted to 3 additional studios to meet demand.

Sigma Sound was one of the first recording studios in the United States to offer 24-track recording and the first anywhere to successfully employ console automation. The varied list of artists attracted by the studios' success included the Trammps, The Manhattans, Robert Palmer, Melba Moore, the Salsoul Orchestra, The Ritchie Family, Grace Jones, Loleatta Holloway, Linda Clifford, Gloria Gaynor, John Travolta and others.

=== Sigma Sound New York ===
In 1977, Tarsia opened a second Sigma Sound studio location in New York City. Located in the Ed Sullivan Theater building, this studio was used by the Village People for their albums Macho Man (1978) and Cruisin' (1978).

Sigma Sound's New York location was a favorite of Talking Heads who, beginning with 1980's Remain in Light, recorded some or all of their albums at Sigma Sound in New York City.

In 1983, Madonna used the New York studios to record her 1983 debut album, Madonna.

Other artists who recorded at Sigma Sound's New York studios include Rick James, Aretha Franklin, the B-52s, the Ramones, Whitney Houston, Steely Dan, Roy Ayers, Ashford & Simpson, Paul Simon and others.

=== Sale and closure ===
Tarsia sold the New York studios in 1988 and the Philadelphia location in 2003, but they still retained the Sigma Sound Studios name. The 6,000 unclaimed tapes from Sigma's 35-year-old tape library are now part of The Drexel University Audio Archive. In 2019, Drexel University's MAD Dragon Music Group released 14 formerly-lost tracks from funk-soul group Nat Turner Rebellion that had been a part of the archive.

The Philadelphia studio closed in 2014. In March 2015, the building that housed Sigma Sound Studios was sold for $1.55 million, with plans to renovate the space for office, retail or residential use.

== Legacy ==
On October 15, 2015, the original building for Sigma Sound Studios was officially dedicated as a historic site by the City of Philadelphia. The historic site marker was placed at 212 N. 12th Street. On November 13, 2020, the Philadelphia Historical Commission voted unanimously to add the building to the Philadelphia Register of Historic Places.

In 2016, Sigma Sound Studios founder Joseph Tarsia was inducted into the Musicians Hall of Fame and Museum.

=== Special Collections Research Center ===
Information on Sigma Sound Studios exists at the Special Collections Research Center at Temple University in Philadelphia. The memorabilia available includes newspaper and magazine clippings, collected ephemera and other publications. There are also photographs of both the New York City and Philadelphia studios, as well as advertising and promotional materials which include "AddZest" materials that are primarily in Japanese. Additionally, there is a limited selection of several types of studio records, and clippings.

== See also ==
- Joseph Tarsia
- Philadelphia soul
- Gamble and Huff
- Philadelphia International Records
- MFSB
