= Dan Pickett (musician) =

American singer

- Born: James Founty; August 31, 1907; Pike County, Alabama, United States
- Died: August 16, 1967 (aged 59) Boaz, Alabama, United States
- Genres: Country blues, Piedmont blues
- Occupations: Singer, guitarist, songwriter
- Instruments: Vocals, guitar
- Years active: 1924–1967
- Label: Gotham Records

James Founty (August 31, 1907 – August 16, 1967), better known as Dan Pickett, was an American Piedmont blues and country blues singer, guitarist and songwriter. He recorded fourteen tracks for Gotham Records in 1949, several of which have been issued more recently. AllMusic noted that "Pickett had a distinctive rhythmic style and unique phrasing that makes his records compelling decades after his release".

For many years, blues researchers failed to firmly establish Pickett's identity. With continuing diligence and the discovery of a contact made regarding royalty payments, more information emerged.

== Biography ==
Pickett was born in Pike County, Alabama. In 1949, he traveled to Philadelphia, where he recorded fourteen songs, ten of which were released by Gotham Records as five 78-rpm singles the same year. The other tracks, along with alternate takes of those issued, were unreleased for decades. Unusually for the time, the recordings were made on a master tape and were of better quality than most other recordings of that era. The songs Pickett recorded were mainly reworkings of songs issued in the 1930s, including versions of Leroy Carr's "How Long", Buddy Moss's "Ride to a Funeral in a V-8", Blind Boy Fuller's "Let Me Squeeze Your Lemon" (renamed "Lemon Man" by Pickett), and Pickett's only gospel music recording, "99 1/2 Won't Do".

By the 1960s, the recordings had become legendary among record collectors who regarded them as some of the best commercial country blues recordings of the post–World War II era. Eventually there emerged a letter from a James Founty to Charles R. Paul, an attorney, dated July 1950, in which Founty claimed he had not been paid royalties. Investigations concluded that Founty's label had paid him for the recording session and that any royalties were determined by that contractual arrangement. The connection to Pickett was suggested by the fact that he did not record any more under any name.

Some reviewers had speculated that he could have been Charlie Pickett, the Tennessee-based guitarist who recorded for Vocalion Records in 1937.

There is no firm evidence of his life after his only recording session, other than details concerning his given name and the dates of his birth and death.

Pickett died in Boaz, Alabama, in August 1967, days short of his 60th birthday.

== Selected discography ==
Country Blues (1990), Collectables Records, compilation album containing all of the songs issued on five singles by Gotham Records in 1949, alternate takes of those songs, and four previously unreleased tracks

== See also ==
- List of Piedmont blues musicians
- List of country blues musicians

== Sources ==
- Bastin, Bruce (1993). "Truckin' My Blues Away: East Coast Piedmont Styles". In Cohn, Lawrence. Nothing but the Blues: The Music and the Musicians. New York, London, Paris: Abbeville Press. pp. 205–231. ISBN 9780789206077.
- Smith, Chris (1987). "Are You from Alabama, Tennessee or Carolina? The Dan Pickett Story So Far". Blues & Rhythm, 30, pp. 4–5.
