= See All Her Faces =

Studio album by Dusty Springfield
- Released: 10 November 1972
- Recorded: 1969–1971 in the US and UK
- Genre: Pop, soul
- Length: 73:19
- Label: Philips
- Producer: Johnny Franz; Dusty Springfield; Ellie Greenwich; Mike Rashkow; Jerry Wexler; Tom Dowd; Arif Mardin; Jeff Barry

Dusty Springfield chronology
A Brand New Me (1970)	See All Her Faces (1972)	Cameo (1973)

Professional ratings
Review scores
Source	Rating
AllMusic	3/5 stars

See All Her Faces is the seventh studio album by singer Dusty Springfield, originally released on the Philips Records label in 1972. It contains a mixture of tracks from different recording sessions; some tracks were recorded with Jeff Barry for an aborted third album for Atlantic Records, other tracks were recorded for Philips in the UK between April and July 1970 – these came to be Springfield's final recordings with longtime producer and arranger Johnny Franz. Some, such as "Willie & Laura Mae Jones", recorded with Jerry Wexler, Tom Dowd and Arif Mardin, had been previously released as singles in the US. See All Her Faces collects many of those tracks, recorded from 1969 to 1971, placing seven of the British recordings on Side A, while Side B comprises tracks recorded both in the UK and the US. As a result, the album has no cohesive sound, but offers many different styles of music. The album boasts eight producers, including Springfield herself. It has been suggested that See All Her Faces is best appreciated track by track, rather than as a whole stylistic statement, as her album Dusty in Memphis is often praised to be.

The See All Her Faces album was never released in the US, and as a consequence the majority of the tracks recorded in the UK would remain unavailable in the States until the release of the Rhino Entertainment compilations Dusty in London and Love Songs – some thirty years later.

In 2002, Mercury Records/Universal Music UK released See All Her Faces in its entirety on CD for the first time, then also including three bonus tracks; two further recordings from the shelved Faithful album with Jeff Barry and also Springfield's interpretation of "What Are You Doing the Rest of Your Life?", written by Alan & Marilyn Bergman and Michel Legrand for the 1969 film The Happy Ending. Springfield recorded her version of the song during the See All Her Faces sessions in London in the summer of 1970, but it was left unheard in the Philips Records archives until 1994.

In 2016, Real Gone Music released 'Come for a Dream – The UK Sessions 1970–71' which featured all the tracks Springfield recorded during the 'See All Her Faces' sessions. It includes Seventeen tracks in total. Upon the original album release there were only nine of these tracks released for the album back in 1972.

In April 2022, 'See All Her Faces' was re-released for its 50th anniversary in limited edition on Record Store Day. Released as a double LP vinyl album. One disc containing fourteen tracks from the original 1972 release, and the second disc containing nine bonus tracks. Three of the bonus tracks 'Haunted', 'Have A Good Life Baby' and 'What Are You Doing The Rest of Your Life?' were already included on the 2002 CD-RE-ISSUE as bonus tracks. On the 2022 LP re-issue an extra six were included which are outtakes from the original sessions from 'See All Her Faces'. The new addition of bonus tracks include 'Go My Love', 'A Song For You', 'Wasn't Born To Follow', 'Sweet Inspiration', 'O-o-H Child' and 'Goodbye (Is All That's Left To Say)'.

== Track listing ==
Side A

1. "Mixed Up Girl" (Jimmy Webb) – 3:29
2. "Crumbs Off the Table" (Scherrie Payne, Ronald Dunbar, Edith Wayne) – 3:03
3. "Let Me Down Easy" (John Simon, Allan Stillman) – 3:44
4. "Come for a Dream" (Antonio Carlos Jobim, Dolores Duran, Norma Tanega) – 3:35
5. "Girls Can't Do What the Guys Do" (Clarence Reid, Willie Clarke) – 2:28
6. "I Start Counting" (Basil Kirchin, Jack Nathan, James Coleman, Patrick Ryan) – 3:02
  - First release: Philips UK single (B-side of Yesterday When I Was Young), 26 May 1972.
7. "Yesterday When I Was Young" ("Hier Encore") (Charles Aznavour, Herbert Kretzmer) – 3:42
  - First release: Philips UK single (A-side), 26 May 1972.
  - All tracks recorded at Trident Studios, London, April–July 1970. Producers: Dusty Springfield & Johnny Franz.

Side B

1. "Girls It Ain't Easy" (Scherrie Payne, Ronald Dunbar, Edith Wayne) – 3:23
  - Recorded at Trident Studios, London, July 1970. Producers: Dusty Springfield & Johnny Franz.
2. "What Good Is I Love You?" (Ellie Greenwich, Mike Rashkow) – 2:57
  - First release: Atlantic US single #2771 (A-side), 12 January 1971. Producers: Ellie Greenwich & Mike Rashkow.
3. "Willie & Laura Mae Jones" (Tony Joe White) – 2:48
  - First release: Atlantic US single #2647 (A-side), 5 June 1969. Producers: Jerry Wexler, Tom Dowd & Arif Mardin.
4. "Someone Who Cares" (Alex Harvey) – 2:55
  - First release: Atlantic US single #2841 (B-side of "I Believe in You"), 14 November 1971. Producer & arranger: Jeff Barry.
5. "Nothing Is Forever" (Jeff Barry, Bobby Bloom) – 2:34
  - First release: Atlantic US single #2825 (B-side of "Haunted"), 4 August 1971. Producer & arranger: Jeff Barry.
6. "See All Her Faces" (Jim Lacey, Jeff Alexander Ryan) – 3:30
  - Recorded at Trident Studios, London, July 1970. Producers: Dusty Springfield & Johnny Franz.
7. "That Old Sweet Roll (Hi-De-Ho)" (Gerry Goffin, Carole King) – 2:58
  - First release: US Atlantic single #2647 (B-side of "Willie & Laura Mae Jones"), 5 June 1969. Producers: Jerry Wexler, Tom Dowd & Arif Mardin.

Bonus tracks (Tracks 15–17 from 2002 CD reissue), (Tracks 15–23 from 2022 expanded edition)

15. "Haunted" (Jeff Barry, Bobby Bloom) – 2:20
  - First release: Atlantic US single #2825 (A-side), 4 August 1971. Recorded at Century Sound Studio, New York, between January and June 1971. Producer: Jeff Barry. First UK release: Dusty in Memphis Plus, 1980.
16. "Have a Good Life Baby" (Neil Brian Goldberg, Joe Renzetti) (not credited) – 3:04
  - Originally unissued. Recorded at Century Sound Studio, New York, between January and June 1971. Producer: Jeff Barry. First US release: Dusty in Memphis Deluxe Edition, Rhino 1999.
17. "What Are You Doing the Rest of Your Life?" (Alan Bergman, Marilyn Bergman, Michel Legrand) – 3:31
  - Originally unissued. Recorded at Trident Studios, London, July 1970. Producers: Dusty Springfield & Johnny Franz. First UK release: 4-CD box set The Legend of Dusty Springfield, 1994. First US release: compilation Dusty in London, Rhino 1999.
18. "Go My Love" (Johann Sebastian Bach, Michel Magne, Norma Tanega) – 3:15 – Outtake from the See All Her Faces sessions. First release: The Legend of Dusty Springfield, 13 June 1994. Producers: Johnny Franz and Dusty Springfield.
19. "A Song for You" (Leon Russell) – 3:34 – Outtake from the See All Her Faces sessions. First release: UK Mercury 2CD compilation Something Special, 1 April 1996. Producers: Johnny Franz and Dusty Springfield.
20. "Wasn't Born to Follow" (Gerry Goffin, Carole King) – 3:29 – Outtake from the See All Her Faces sessions. First release: UK Mercury 2CD compilation Something Special, 1 April 1996. Producers: Johnny Franz and Dusty Springfield.
21. "Sweet Inspiration" (John Cameron) – 3:14 – Outtake from the See All Her Faces sessions. First release: US Atlantic/Rhino CD compilation Dusty in London, 16 February 1999. Producers: Johnny Franz and Dusty Springfield.
22. "O-o-h Child" (Stan Vincent) – 3:17 – Outtake from the See All Her Faces sessions. First release: US Atlantic/Rhino CD compilation Love Songs, 16 January 2001. Producers: Johnny Franz and Dusty Springfield.
23. "Goodbye (Is All That's Left To Say)" (Spike Milligan) – 3:22 – Outtake from the See All Her Faces sessions. First release: Mercury/Universal Music Group 4CD/3DVD boxed set Goin' Back: The Definitive Dusty Springfield, 12 December 2011. Producers: Johnny Franz and Dusty Springfield.

== Personnel and production ==
- Dusty Springfield – vocals, producer all tracks unless otherwise noted
- Johnny Franz – producer all tracks unless otherwise noted
- Peter J. Olliff – sound engineer
- Jimmy Horowitz – orchestra director
- Peter Knight – conductor, orchestra director
- Keith Mansfield – orchestra director
- Wally Stott – orchestra director
- Derek Wadsworth – orchestra director
- Lesley Duncan – background vocals
- Kay Garner – background vocals
- Ellie Greenwich – producer "What Good Is I Love You?"
- Michael Rashkow – producer "What Good Is I Love You?"
- Jerry Wexler – producer "Willie & Laura Mae Jones" & "That Old Sweet Roll (Hi-De-Ho)"
- Tom Dowd – producer "Willie & Laura Mae Jones" & "That Old Sweet Roll (Hi-De-Ho)"
- Arif Mardin – producer "Willie & Laura Mae Jones" & "That Old Sweet Roll (Hi-De-Ho)"
- Jeff Barry – arranger, producer "Someone Who Cares", "Nothing Is Forever", ("Haunted" & "Have a Good Life Baby")
- Roger Wake – remixing (2002 re-issue)
- Mike Gill – remixing (2002 re-issue)

== Sources ==
=== Bibliography ===
- Howes, Paul (2001). The Complete Dusty Springfield. London: Reynolds & Hearn Ltd. ISBN 1-903111-24-2.
