= Brand New Me (Dusty Springfield song) =

Single by Dusty Springfield

from the album A Brand New Me
- B-side: "Bad Case Of The Blues"
- Released: October 15, 1969
- Recorded: October 6, 1969
- Studio: Sigma Sound, Philadelphia, Pennsylvania
- Length: 2:29
- Label: Atlantic (North America); Philips (international)
- Songwriters: Thom Bell, Jerry Butler, Kenneth Gamble
- Producer: Roland Chambers

Dusty Springfield singles chronology
"In the Land of Make Believe" (1969)	"Brand New Me" (1969)	"Silly, Silly Fool" (1970)

"Brand New Me", also A Brand New Me, is a 1969 song performed by Dusty Springfield written by Kenneth Gamble, Thom Bell and Jerry Butler. Butler's version had previously been issued as the B-side of "What's the Use of Breaking Up." The single reached a peak position of 24 on the Billboard Hot 100 chart.

== Background ==
Billboard described the single as "a potent rhythm item that should quickly bring her back to the 'Windmills of Your Mind' selling bag." and also praised the song's arrangement.

== Charts ==
Date	Chart	Peak position
December 19, 1969	US Billboard Hot 100	24
January 9, 1970	US Adult Contemporary (Billboard)	3

== Cover versions ==
- It was covered by Aretha Franklin.
