= Weldon McDougal =

- Born: Weldon Arthur McDougal; 1936; United States
- Died: 2010
- Occupation(s): Songwriter, producer, musician

Weldon McDougal was a singer, songwriter, record producer and a record label executive. He also founded the Philadelphia recording group The Larks. He produced "Yes, I'm Ready" for Barbara Mason. As a song writer, along with Guy Hemric and Jerry Styner, he co-wrote "Doing It Right" for The Go! Team which appeared on their Proof of Youth album.

== Band membership ==
He is credited as the founder of the Philadelphia group, The Larks. In 1954, he was singing bass. Along with Calvin Nichols, Mary Archer and the Blalock brothers, Clarence & Bill Blalock, he started a group called The Victors. Not long after the formation, Mary Archer left the group and her replacement was Herman Green. The progress of the Victors was interrupted with McDougal joining the marines at the end of the year. While in still in the marines, he was performing in a group with the same name. He left the service in 1958, and went about reforming The Victors. The only member he could get was Calvin Nichols. He managed to bring other members, Jackie Marshall who was a high tenor. Then Baritone Bill Oxendine joined up. McDougal's wife Cleopatra also joined the group. He changed the name of the group to The Larks after seeing a brand of nails called Lark. One day Weldon ran into Atlantic Records promo man Jerry Ross. His group auditioned for Ross, and the Larks recorded around six tracks. The backing band on the session was called The Manhattans and included keyboardist Ruben Wright, guitarist Johnny Stiles, sax player Harrison Scott and drummer Norman Conners. In 1961, their recording "It's Unbelievable" was released on the Sheryl label. It entered the charts at no 78 for the Week Ending 12th March, 1961. It eventually rose to no 69 on the Billboard pop charts. Jerry Ross arranged for the group to appear on American Bandstand to sing their song.

== Record label career ==
Around 1964, McDougal had begun work with Chips Distributors. It was reported in the May 15, 1965, edition of Billboard that McDougal along with John H. Stiles, Luther Randolph and James Bishop had set up Stilran Music which was located at the offices of Universal Record Distributors. In October 1967, he joined Motown Records as their regional promotion man, based in Philadelphia.

In 1982, he was the national promotion director for Philly World Records.

During the 1980s he was guest co-host on the R&B Showcase Radio Show.

== Legacy ==
McDougal has a place in history as one of many black record promoters who helped black artists gain recognition in the pop music field both in the US and abroad. He played an important part in what came to be known as the Philly Sound. He was also something of a photographer and took some rare Motown photographs.

== Death ==
McDougal died on October 22, 2010, from pancreatic cancer.
