= A Brand New Me (Dusty Springfield album) =

- Cover of the American release of the album

Studio album by Dusty Springfield
- Released: 15 January 1970
- Recorded: September–October 1969
- Studio: Sigma Sound, Philadelphia, Pennsylvania
- Genre: Pop, soul
- Length: 25:52
- Label: Atlantic
- Producer: Kenneth Gamble, Leon Huff

Dusty Springfield chronology
Dusty in Memphis (1969)	A Brand New Me (1970)	See All Her Faces (1972)

Singles from A Brand New Me
- 1. "A Brand New Me" Released: 15 October 1969; 2. "Silly, Silly Fool" Released: 30 January 1970

A Brand New Me is the sixth studio album by English singer Dusty Springfield, released in 1970.

== Writing and recording ==
The album was recorded in late 1969 at the Sigma Sound Studios in Philadelphia. It is Springfield's only album on which every song was produced by the same production team: Kenny Gamble and Leon Huff. Gamble also co-wrote every track on the album, and the Gamble and Huff duo went on to have success with many groups and singers in the 1970s, among them Harold Melvin & the Blue Notes, The O'Jays, MFSB and The Three Degrees.

== Release and promotion ==
The album was first released in the United States by Atlantic Records in January 1970. Its release in the United Kingdom followed three months later by Philips Records, under the title From Dusty with Love.

The title track was released as a single in the US in late 1969, peaking at No. 3 on the US Adult Contemporary chart and No. 24 on the Top 40 chart on 20 December 1969; Springfield would not have another Top 40 hit in the US for 17 years. From Dusty with Love was Springfield's last UK album to feature her name in the title; all but one of her previous five albums had done so. The album had moderate success in the UK, peaking at No. 35 on their album chart; the US release, however, stalled at No. 107.

In 1992, Atlantic Records/Warner Music Group's sublabel Rhino Entertainment re-released a digitally remastered edition of A Brand New Me in the US, featuring nine bonus tracks originally issued as A- and B-side singles in the US in the years following the A Brand New Me album's release, among them recordings made with both Jerry Wexler, Tom Dowd, Arif Mardin and Ellie Greenwich as well as tracks from a shelved second album with Gamble & Huff, and one track recorded for Philips Records, but never released by Atlantic (Springfield's contract with Atlantic allowed them to release Philips recordings). Some of these recordings were first issued in the UK on the 1972 album See All Her Faces (which had no US counterpart), others would remain unavailable in the UK for another ten years until PolyGram released an expanded edition of Dusty in Memphis as part of their mid-price series Reflections, entitled Dusty in Memphis Plus and released on the Mercury Records label in the UK and the rest of Europe in September 1980.

From Dusty with Love was first issued on CD by Philips Records/PolyGram and re-issued in Europe in the early 1990s. A digitally remastered CD edition of From Dusty with Love was released by Mercury/Universal Music Group in the UK/Europe in 2002, featuring alternate versions of recordings from the 1970 Gamble & Huff sessions as bonus tracks.

== Critical reception ==
Professional ratings
Review scores
Source	Rating
AllMusic (US Release)	4.5/5 stars
AllMusic (UK Release)	3/5 stars
Christgau's Record Guide	B−

Reviewing in Christgau's Record Guide: Rock Albums of the Seventies (1981), Robert Christgau wrote: "Kenny Gamble and Leon Huff have bestowed upon Dusty—who as a singer of contemporary pop has only one peer, Dionne Warwick—the same cool-soul formula that's worked so successfully for Jerry Butler, but here it's wearing thin. The songs (every one written in part by Gamble) echo each other melodically and rhythmically, the instrumentation never varies, and neither does the vocal mood. If only Dusty could bring all her moods together—starting with her harder-driving stuff and working through the title cut here—she'd make a greater album than Dusty in Memphis. But that's a lot to ask."

== Track listing ==
Side A
No.	Title	Writer(s)	Length
1.	"Lost"	Kenneth Gamble, Leon Huff, Jerry Butler	2:26
2.	"Bad Case of the Blues"	Roland Chambers, Kenny Gamble	1:59
3.	"Never Love Again"	Roland Chambers, Kenny Gamble, Leon Huff	3:21
4.	"Let Me in Your Way (Let Me Get in Your Way [UK])"	Roland Chambers, Kenny Gamble	2:45
5.	"Let's Get Together Soon"	Kenny Gamble, Leon Huff	2:41

Side B
No.	Title	Writer(s)	Length
1.	"Brand New Me"	Thom Bell, Jerry Butler, Kenny Gamble	2:27
2.	"Joe"	Allan Felder, Kenny Gamble, Norman Harris	2:21
3.	"Silly, Silly Fool"	Kenny Gamble, Leon Huff	2:30
4.	"The Star of My Show"	Kenny Gamble, Leon Huff	2:28
5.	"Let's Talk It Over"	Kenny Gamble, Leon Huff	2:27

=== Bonus tracks CD re-issues ===
Bonus tracks A Brand New Me, Rhino Records 1992
No.	Title	Writer(s)	Release History	Length
11.	"I Wanna Be a Free Girl"	Thom Bell, Linda Creed, Kenneth Gamble, Leon Huff	First release: Atlantic US single #2729 (A-side), 16 April 1970; First UK release: Dusty in Memphis Plus, 1980	2:54
12.	"What Good Is I Love You?"	Ellie Greenwich, Mike Rashkow	First release: Atlantic US single #2771 (A-side), 12 January 1971; First UK release: See All Her Faces, 1972	2:56
13.	"What Do You Do When Love Dies"	Mary Unobsky, Donna Weiss	First release: Atlantic US single #2771 (B-side of "What Good Is I Love You"); First UK release: Dusty in Memphis Plus, 1980	2:39
14.	"Haunted"	Jeff Barry, Bobby Bloom	First release: Atlantic US single #2825 (A-side), 4 August 1971; First UK release: Dusty in Memphis Plus, 1980	2:25
15.	"Nothing Is Forever"	Jeff Barry, Bobby Bloom	First release: Atlantic US single #2825 (B-side of "Haunted"); First UK release: See All Her Faces, 1972	2:31
16.	"Someone Who Cares"	Alex Harvey	First release: Atlantic US single #2841 (B-side of "I Believe in You"), 14 November 1971; First UK release: See All Her Faces, 1972	2:53
17.	"I Believe in You"	Jeff Barry	First release: Atlantic US single #2841 (A-side), 14 November 1971; First UK release: Dusty in Memphis Plus, 1980	3:09
18.	"I'll Be Faithful" (Mono mix)	Ned W. Albright, Michael F. Soles, Steve Soles	Originally unissued	2:59
19.	"I Can't Give Back the Love I Feel for You" (Alternate mix)	Nickolas Ashford, Brian Holland, Valerie Simpson	Originally unissued mix. First release original mix: Dusty... Definitely, 1968	2:30

- Track 11. Recording date: March 1970. Recorded at Sigma Sound Studios, Philadelphia. Producers: staff for Gamble-Huff Productions. Arranger:Thom Bell.
- Track 12. Recording date: 23 July 1970. Recorded at A & R Studios, New York. Producers: Ellie Greenwich & Mike Rashkow.
- Track 13. Recording date: September 1968. Recorded at American Studios, Memphis. Dusty Springfield's final vocals recorded in New York. Producers: Jerry Wexler, Tom Dowd & Arif Mardin.
- Tracks 14 & 15. Recording date: 27 March 1971. Recorded at Century Sound Studio, New York. Producer & arranger: Jeff Barry.
- Tracks 16, 17 & 18. Recording date: between January and June 1971. Recorded at Century Sound Studio, New York. Producer & arranger: Jeff Barry.

Bonus tracks From Dusty with Love, Mercury Records 2002
No.	Title	Writer(s)	Release History	Length
11.	"The Richest Girl Alive [UK recording]"	Kenny Gamble, Leon Huff	Originally unissued (although a different recording of the song was first released on the US compilation Love Songs, Rhino/Atlantic 2001)	2:43
12.	"Summer Love [UK recording]"	Kenny Gamble, Leon Huff	Originally unissued (although a different recording of the song was first released on the US compilation Love Songs, Rhino/Atlantic 2001)	2:47
13.	"I Wanna Be a Free Girl"	Thom Bell, Linda Creed, Kenny Gamble, Leon Huff	First release: Atlantic US single #2729 (A-side), 16 April 1970; First UK release: Dusty in Memphis Plus, 1980 = 2:55

- Tracks 11–13. Recording date: February–March 1970. Recorded at Sigma Sound Studios, Philadelphia. Producers: Gamble & Huff Productions.

Other tracks

Recorded February 1970 at Sigma Sound Studios, Philadelphia. Producers: Gamble & Huff Productions.

- "Something for Nothing" – 2:52
- "Cherished" – 2:39
- "Goodbye" – 2:34
- "Sweet Charlie" – 2:57

"Sweet Charlie" was originally thought to have been titled "Sweet Charlie Babe". Singer Jackie Moore released a song with the latter title a few years later, and due to the similarity of the titles, it was thought that Moore had used a backing track for what had been assumed to be Springfield's version, and simply recorded over Springfield's vocals. However, it was discovered in the late 2010s that Springfield had, in fact, recorded the track "Sweet Charlie" instead, a completely different song to Moore's. Due to the mistaken assumption that Moore had recorded over Springfield's vocals, the track remained unmixed and unreleased until the mistake was discovered and the song finally released 47 years after its recording, in 2017, on the compilation "A Brand New Me: The Complete Philadelphia Sessions".

== Personnel ==
- Dusty Springfield – vocals
- Ugene Dozier – piano, producer
- Roland Chambers – guitar, arranger, producer
- Vincent Montana Jr. – background vocals, vibraphone
- Norman Harris – guitar
- Ronnie Baker – bass guitar
- Earl Young – drums
- The Sweethearts of Sigma – background vocals
- Don Renaldo & His String Section – strings
- Sam Reed & His Horn Section – horns
- Thom Bell – arranger
- Bobby Martin – arranger
- Recorded at Sigma Sound Studios, Philadelphia
- Joe Tarsia – engineer
- Loring Eutemey – cover design (A Brand New Me)
- Dan Hersch – remastering (A Brand New Me, 1992 re-issue)
- Bill Inglot – remastering (A Brand New Me, 1992 re-issue)
- Jim Feldman – liner notes (A Brand New Me, 1992 re-issue)
- Deborah Frost – project assistant (A Brand New Me, 1992 re-issue)
- Mike Gill – remastering/mix (From Dusty with Love, 2002 re-issue)
- Roger Wake – remastering/mix (From Dusty with Love, 2002 re-issue)

== Charts ==
Album – Billboard (United States)

Year	Chart	Position
1970	Pop Albums US Billboard '200'	107
1970	UK Albums Chart	35

Singles – Billboard (United States)

Year	Single	Chart	Position
1969	"A Brand New Me"	Pop Singles	24
1969	"A Brand New Me"	Adult Contemporary	3
1970	"Silly, Silly Fool"	Pop Singles	76
1970	"Silly, Silly Fool"	Adult Contemporary	25
1970	"I Wanna Be a Free Girl"	Pop Singles	105
1970	"I Wanna Be a Free Girl"	Adult Contemporary	25

== Sources ==
- Howes, Paul (2001). The Complete Dusty Springfield. London: Reynolds & Hearn Ltd. ISBN 1-903111-24-2.
