= Doug Quattlebaum =

American singer

- Born: Elijah Douglas Quattlebaum; January 22, 1929; Florence, South Carolina, United States
- Died: March 1, 1996 (aged 67) Philadelphia, Pennsylvania, United States
- Genres: Piedmont blues
- Occupations: Guitarist, singer, songwriter
- Instruments: Guitar, voice
- Years active: Late 1940s–early 1970s
- Labels: Gotham Records, Bluesville Records

Elijah Douglas Quattlebaum (January 22, 1929 – March 1, 1996), better known as Doug Quattlebaum, was an American Piedmont blues guitarist, singer and songwriter. He recorded one single for Gotham Records in 1953, but was offered another opportunity following his employment as an ice cream salesman.

== Life and career ==
Quattlebaum was born in Florence, South Carolina, as the only child of his mother's first marriage. He spent the first thirteen years of his life there and was initially inspired by the music of Blind Boy Fuller. He fashioned crudely constructed homemade guitars from wire and cigar boxes. His mother remarried (to a brother of Arthur Crudup's) in the early 1940s, when Quattlebaum was aged fourteen, and the family moved to Philadelphia. His stepfather purchased Quattlebaum's first real guitar and showed him how to play one chord; as a teenager Quattlebaum mastered the basics of playing the instrument.

He toured playing guitar accompaniment for several gospel groups, and reckoned he first recorded with the Bells of Joy in Texas. Quattlebaum recorded solo in 1953, as a blues singer and guitarist, for the Philadelphia-based Gotham Records. He cut three tracks for the label, "Don't Be Funny, Baby", "Lizzie Lou", and "Foolin' Me". The first two were released as a 78-rpm single by Gotham the same year; "Foolin' Me" was not released until many years later. The recording was not a success, and Quattlebaum fell into obscurity, but by 1961 he was back, playing accompaniment for the Ward Singers. In June the same year, he was "rediscovered" playing popular and blues songs through the public address system of his Mister Softee ice cream van. The blues historian Pete Welding, who became known for discovering talent in unusual places, heard his performances and arranged for him to record an album for Testament Records. For reasons unknown it was not released, but Welding recorded him again the following year for the album Softee Man Blues (financed by Moe of the Pep Boys), released by Bluesville Records in 1963. The front cover of the album displayed a photograph of Quattlebaum in his ice cream uniform.

The album was well received by critics, who noted his powerful voice and his Blind Boy Fuller–inspired guitar playing. Quattlebaum wrote a number of his own compositions, but the collection contained his versions of songs previously recorded by others, including "So Sweet" (Fuller), "Mama Don't Allow Me to Stay Out All Night Long" (Crudup), "Trouble in Mind" (Richard M. Jones), "Whiskey Headed Woman" (Lightnin' Hopkins), "You Is One Black Rat" (Little Son Joe and Memphis Minnie), "Big Leg Woman" (Johnny Temple), "Black Night Is Falling" (Roy Brown), and "Baby, Take a Chance with Me" (Jazz Gillum). This led to Quattlebaum making a number of appearances on the folk circuit, during the revival of the 1960s. He soon returned to Philadelphia, although he recorded a single for the obscure Na-Cat Records around 1970. It is believed Quattlebaum entered the ministry shortly thereafter.

Quattlebaum died in March 1996, aged 67, in Philadelphia. His "lost" album, If You've Ever Been Mistreated, was finally issued the following year.

== Discography ==
=== Singles ===
Year	A-side	B-side	Record label
1953	"Don't Be Funny, Baby"	"Lizzie Lou"	Gotham Records
Late 1960s	"Jailhouse Blues"	"Baby I'm Back"	Na-Cat Records

=== Albums ===
Year	Title	Record label	Notes
1963	Softee Man Blues	Bluesville Records	
1997	If You've Ever Been Mistreated	Testament Records	Recorded 1961 but unreleased at that time

== See also ==
- List of Piedmont blues musicians
