= Flybanger =

Canadian metal band

- Also known as: Jar., Jarr.
- Origin: Vancouver, British Columbia, Canada
- Genres: Alternative metal, nu metal, post-grunge
- Years active: 1995–2003
- Labels: Gotham Records, Columbia, Factor Records
- Past members: Garth Allen; Bryan Fratesi; Tom MacDonald; Rob Wade; Chris Smith

Flybanger was a Canadian alternative metal band from Vancouver. They are best known for their 2001 major label release Headtrip to Nowhere.

== History ==
The band started out performing under the name Jar. They released two CDs under that name, including Knott Skull in 1998. The song "Regional Pump" from their 1996 debut Harsh and Discord appeared in the credits for the Canadian science fiction film Laserhawk, released in 1997.

Because there was more than one other band with the same name, the band members decided to rename their group Flybanger. They released a five track EP titled Outlived in 2000.

In 2001, the band released an album, Headtrip to Nowhere, as Flybanger through Sony Music in 2001, which was produced by Matt Wallace (Faith No More, The Replacements, Deftones, Maroon 5, etc.). Playing on the album were singer Garth Allen, guitarist Bryan Fratesi, Tom Macdonald on bass and Rob Wade on drums. The singles released from Headtrip To Nowhere were "Cavalry", "Radical" and "Blind World". The latter was also used on the soundtrack for the motion picture Dracula 2000.

The band toured in support of the album.

In 2003, the band broke up. In 2005, Rob Wade (drums) and Garth Allen (vocals) joined Kill Rhythm, a band started by Rob Thiessen (formerly of Noise Therapy). In March 2009, following the breakup of Kill Rhythm, both Wade and Allen turned their focus to the heavy acoustic rock project, The Thick of It.

In 2013, the band released an album under their original name of Jar. containing re-recordings of several of their older songs.

== Members ==
- Garth Allen – vocals
- Bryan Fratesi – guitar
- Tom MacDonald – bass, vocals
- Rob Wade – drums, percussion
- Chris Smith – bass

== Discography as Flybanger ==
- Outlived EP (Gotham Records – 2000)
1. Mind
2. Alone
3. Outlived
4. When Are You (Gonna Die)
5. Bleak
- Headtrip to Nowhere (Columbia Records – 2001)
1. Cavalry
2. Radical
3. Blind World
4. Pull
5. Evelyn
6. Haul
7. Demon Away
8. Crackballs
9. Weapon
10. This Is Bliss
11. When Are You (Gonna Die)
12. Company

== Discography as Jar. ==
- Harsh And Discord EP (self released – 1996)
1. Haul
2. Regional Pump
3. Freeze Up
4. Flybanger
5. Black
6. Code Name
7. Gun In Your Hand
- Knott Skull (Factor Records – 1998)
1. Cavalry
2. Weapon
3. Pull
4. Shame
5. Mind Alone
6. Skidmark
7. Outlived
8. When Are You (Gonna Die)
9. Sucker Punch
10. Someday
11. Shame (alternative version
12. Bleak (hidden track)
- Jar (self released – 2013)
1. Suckerpunch
2. Haul
3. Outlived
4. Weapon
5. Pull
6. Regional Pump
7. Skidmark
8. Shame
9. Cavalry
10. Freeze Up
11. 3 Lives
- 2003 Demos (self released – 2020)
1. Deadstar
2. Devices
3. Down the Middle
4. Lifer
5. Nobody
6. Ocean
7. Outside
8. Sml
9. Victims of the Son
10. Wrong

== Discography as Jarr. ==
- Jarr EP (self released – 2003)
1. Down The Middle
2. Deadstar
3. Ocean
4. Nobody
5. Lifer
6. Devices
