= Headtrip to Nowhere =

Studio album by Flybanger
- Released: February 20, 2001
- Recorded: Rumbo Studios in Los Angeles, California
- Genre: Nu metal, alternative metal, post-grunge
- Label: Columbia
- Producer: Matt Wallace

Flybanger chronology
Outlived (2000)	Headtrip to Nowhere (2001)

Singles from Headtrip to Nowhere
- 1. "Cavalry" Released: 2001; 2. "Radical" Released: 2001; 3. "Blind World" Released: 2001

Headtrip to Nowhere is the major label debut album by the Canadian heavy metal band Flybanger. It was released on February 20, 2001, through Columbia Records. The CD is enhanced to include a video of the song "Outlived", not otherwise heard on the disc. The album included two tracks which had been released with the band's Outlived EP. This album was Flybanger's only major release before disbanding.

== Overview ==
The album was produced by Matt Wallace, known for his work with Faith No More and Deftones. Two songs feature a guest appearance by the former Faith No More guitarist Jim Martin. Wallace had asked the band who they wanted as a guest on the album, and they said Martin since they were fans of Faith No More. Vocalist Garth remembered in 2001, "Matt phoned him and he flew in a few days later and jammed with us. It turned out really cool because he brought a new element to the songs he was on and it was rad meeting him cause I'm such a Faith No More geek. I was taking pictures of his guitar case because it still says Faith No More on it." The band kept in touch with Martin after the album was finished. The third and final single to be released from the album, "Blind World", was used on the Dracula 2000 film soundtrack.

Various subject matters are examined in Headtrip to Nowhere. "Cavalry" tells a futuristic story; "Evelyn" depicts sadness, "Blind World" is a commentary on people's response to Y2K. Explicit references to drug use are made in "Crackballs", which lyrically revolves around meeting a drug using woman from Hastings Street. It is a real street located in the band's home city of Vancouver, British Columbia. It is known for its large homeless population and drug use, and around this time many prostitutes were also going missing from the street, several of whom were victims of the serial killer Robert Pickton.

The album cover photo shows Sean Evans, the art director. The album's title comes from the lyrics to "Evelyn".

== Touring ==
In promotion of Headtrip to Nowhere, Flybanger toured with Clutch and Corrosion of Conformity before performing shows with extreme metal bands like Sepultura, Soulfly, Hatebreed and Chimaira in early 2001. That summer, they joined nu metal bands like Stereomud, Endo and The Union Underground for the Pain & Suffering tour. A DVD was released of the tour which included a live performance of "Cavalry".

== Reception ==
Professional ratings
Review scores
Source	Rating
Allmusic	link
CANOE	(unfavorable) link
PopMatters	(unfavorable) link

While not a significant commercial success, Headtrip to Nowhere was critically praised for its allegiance to traditional heavy metal and neglect for popular styles of the time such as nu metal. William Ruhlmann of AllMusic commended drummer Rob Wade for his engaging rhythms, noting "His work makes the band's music far more impressive than it would be otherwise." Natalie Hawk of Fast Forward magazine cited bass guitarist Tom MacDonald's work among the most outstanding and compared the overall style to that of Pantera. However, the large number of expletives used throughout the album, as well as its lack of musical originality, drew criticism, particularly from Jason Thompson of PopMatters. Many album reviews also panned the song "Crackballs" particularly.

CANOE's Mike Ross expressed overwhelming disappointment in the album's overly produced sound: "Every power chord, scream, atonal riff, gritty lyric and thundering groove – there's way too much going on, that's another thing [wrong with the album] – has been polished to perfection, sucking the life out of what could've been a worthy new hard-rock record." Contrary to other reviewers, however, Ross showed favor toward "Crack Balls". He also foresaw Flybanger as an exceptional live act but summed up the review by calling Headtrip to Nowhere "middle of the road metal".

== Track listing ==
No.	Title	Length
1.	"Cavalry"	3:11
2.	"Radical"	3:19
3.	"Blind World"	4:03
4.	"Pull"	4:01
5.	"Evelyn"	4:57
6.	"Haul"	3:35
7.	"Demon Away"	3:49
8.	"Crackballs"	5:02
9.	"Weapon"	3:22
10.	"This is Bliss"	4:39
11.	"When Are You? (Gonna Die)"	2:40
12.	"Company"	3:42

== Personnel ==
- Garth – lead vocals
- Bryan Fratesi – guitar
- Tom MacDonald – bass guitar, vocals
- Rob Wade – drums, percussion
- Jim Martin – guitar on tracks "Cavalry" and "When Are You (Gonna Die)?"
- Matt Wallace – production
- Dave Jerden – production, mixing
- Sean Evans – art direction
