= Jerry Ross (music producer) =

- Birth name: Jerry Jan Ross
- Born: May 1, 1933; Philadelphia, Pennsylvania, United States
- Died: October 4, 2017 (aged 84); Meadowbrook, Pennsylvania, United States
- Occupation(s): Songwriter, record producer

Jerry Jan Ross (May 1, 1933 – October 4, 2017) was an American songwriter, A&R man, record producer, and record label owner. As a writer, his greatest success was with "I'm Gonna Make You Love Me," which he co-wrote with his protégé Kenny Gamble and Leon Huff. His greatest successes as a producer include "Sunny" by Bobby Hebb, and he also released "Venus" by Shocking Blue in the United States. Jerry produced The Mob on their self-titled first album in 1970.

== Biography ==
Ross was born in Philadelphia, and grew up with aspirations to be a trumpeter and singer before deciding to become a songwriter and record producer. After a period in Armed Forces Radio, he studied at Temple University, and began working at WFIL-TV (later WPVI). When Dick Clark began hosting the TV show American Bandstand, Ross became his booth announcer, and also started hosting Clark's WFIL radio show, Caravan of Music.

He set up his own record production and promotion business, Ross Associates, in Philadelphia in the early 1960s, and increasingly became involved in all aspects of the work of record production, "from writing or buying the song, finding the right artist, hiring the crew 'and telling them what I was looking for in a sound.' ... followed by the business part - promoting the music, getting it distributed, into the stores and on the radio." He signed the 17-year-old singer Kenny Gamble to a songwriting contract, and started writing songs with him, including "I'm Gonna Make You Love Me," first recorded by Dee Dee Warwick in 1966 and later an international hit for Diana Ross and the Supremes with the Temptations.

In 1965 he moved to New York to work in A&R at Mercury Records, where he worked with musicians including Bobby Hebb, Spanky & Our Gang, Jay & The Techniques, and Jerry Butler, and produced Bobby Hebb's 1966 hit "Sunny". Ross wrote "Mr. Dream Merchant" with Larry Weiss, which was recorded by Jerry Butler and later New Birth. After leaving Mercury, he set up his own record labels, Heritage and Colossus. He came across "Venus" by the Dutch band Shocking Blue that was a hit in Europe, and secured the rights for its release in the United States. "Venus" became a US No. 1 hit on the Colossus label in early 1970. Other songs by Dutch bands he released were "Ma Belle Amie" by Tee-Set and "Little Green Bag" by George Baker Selection the same year. However, he had to shut down Colossus in 1971.

He also worked with Motown for about a year in the early 1970s. In 1972, the label released an album of orchestral pop cover recordings under his name, The Jerry Ross Symposium Vol. II, a previous album of the same format having been released in 1969 by Ross's Colossus label. Both albums were arranged and conducted by Claus Ogerman.

He continued to work as a songwriter, record publisher and promoter in Philadelphia. In 2013 he was inducted into the Philadelphia Music Alliance Walk of Fame.

Ross died of prostate cancer in Meadowbrook, Pennsylvania, at the age of 84.

== Record labels ==
Around 1960, he set up the Sheryl Records Inc. label. Later he recorded a local group called The Larks. His efforts paid off and with The Larks recording on his label, they had a hit with "It's Unbelievable" in 1961. Some of the other acts to record for the label were Tommy De Noble, Cleopatra, The Co-Eds and The Del Knights.
