= Gotham Records =

Refers to two American record labels

Gotham Records was an American record label formed by Sam Goode (Goody) and Ivin Ballen in New York City in 1946. In January 1948 Ballen acquired the interest of Goode and became the sole owner. He then moved the company to Philadelphia, Pennsylvania, where the label was based for the rest of its existence until 1956. The label specialized in rhythm and blues. Ivin Ballen died in Miami Beach, Florida, in February 1978.

== Artists ==
Dan Pickett

Gotham's most notable contribution to American music was the release of recordings by the acoustic bluesman Dan Pickett, originally recorded in 1949.

Doug Quattlebaum

Another artist who recorded for Gotham was Doug Quattlebaum. His song "Lizzie Lou" was one of the last releases for the label.

Doris Browne, The Capris

Doris Browne was a singer who around the 1949/1950 period had performed on a weekly show which was broadcast by WPEN-AM in Philadelphia. The hour long show was called the "Parisian Tailor Kiddie Hour". In 1953, the label appeared to be keen to push Browne's profile with her single "Please Believe Me" b/w "Oh, Baby!". She was backed by Doc Bagby on that recording. He also backed her on her single, "Until The End Of Time" b/w "Why Don't You Love Me Now, Now, Now?" (Gotham G-296), and another recording "The Game Of Love" b/w "My Cherie" which was released on Gotham G-298 as a 45 rpm single. The single, "Until The End Of Time"/"Why Don't You Love Me Now", originally credited to Doris Browne, Doc Bagby Orchestra, was re-released on Collectables Records, but this time credited to Doris Browne & The Capris. Gotham Records also had a Capris group of their own which released their debut single "God Only Knows" b/w "That's What You're Doing To Me", (Gotham 304) in 1954. They also had two other singles released; "It Was Moonglow" b/w "Too Poor To Love" (Gotham 306), and "It's A Miracle" b/w "Let's Linger A While" (Gotham 308).

== Santa Monica-based label ==
A same-named label is available in Santa Monica. It was founded by Patrick Arn in New York City in 1994. The label specializes in newcomer rock bands. Some of the older bands who signed at this Gotham Records signed later at Columbia Records (for example: Flybanger) or to Lava Records (Liquid Gang). The Loose Nutz produced their first Gold Record Wishen at Gotham Records.

=== Background ===
In 2013, the label was releasing eight LPs and eight CDs per year. Its distribution was being handled by Sony RED.

=== Artists ===
Around 2007, it was announced in punknews.org that Red Horizon had signed to the label and recently released their album Across the World.

Bands and artists currently signed at Gotham Records

- Red Horizon
- Supafuzz
- The day After...

Bands who were signed at Gotham Records

- Flybanger
- Fear The Clown
- Liquid Gang
- Chiba-Ken
