= The Windmills of Your Mind =

- A-side label of UK vinyl single

Single by Noel Harrison

from the album The Thomas Crown Affair
- B-side: "Leitch on the Beach"
- Released: 1968
- Label: Reprise
- Composer: Michel Legrand
- Lyricists: Alan and Marilyn Bergman (English); Eddy Marnay (French)
- Producer: Jimmy Bowen

"The Windmills of Your Mind" is a song with music by French composer Michel Legrand and English lyrics written by American lyricists Alan and Marilyn Bergman. French lyrics, under the title "Les Moulins de mon cœur", were written by Eddy Marnay. It was originally recorded by the English actor Noel Harrison in 1968.

The song (with the English lyrics) was introduced in the film The Thomas Crown Affair (1968) and won the Academy Award for Best Original Song. In 2004, "Windmills of Your Mind" was ranked 57 in AFI's 100 Years...100 Songs survey of top songs in American cinema. A cover by Sting was used in the 1999 remake of The Thomas Crown Affair.

== Composition/original recording ==
In the original 1968 film The Thomas Crown Affair, the song is heard – sung by Noel Harrison – during opening credits; and, during the film, in a scene in which the character Thomas Crown flies a glider at the glider airport in Salem, New Hampshire.

Producer/director Norman Jewison had edited the rough cut for the glider scene using the Beatles track "Strawberry Fields Forever", but then commissioned an original song which would reference the ambivalent feelings of Thomas Crown as he engages in a favorite pastime while experiencing the tension of preparing to commit a major robbery.

Alan Bergman said of the creation of the song: "Michel [Legrand] played us [Marilyn Bergman and me] seven or eight melodies. We listened to all of them and decided to wait until the next day to choose one. We three decided on the same one, a long baroque melody... The lyric we wrote was stream-of-consciousness. We felt that the song had to be a mind trip of some kind" – "The [eventual] title was [originally] a line at the end of a section... When we finished we said: 'What do we call this? It's got to have a title. That line is kind of interesting.' So we restructured the song so that the line appeared again at the end. It came out of the body of the song. I think we were thinking, you know when you try to fall asleep at night and you can't turn your brain off and thoughts and memories tumble."

Noel Harrison recorded the song after Andy Williams passed on it. According to Harrison: "It was recorded live on a huge sound stage at Paramount, with the accompanying film clips running on a giant screen and Michel blowing kisses to the orchestra."

Harrison took issue with the couplet "Like a tunnel that you follow to a tunnel of its own / Down a hollow to a cavern where the sun has never shone", singing the word "shone" British-style with a short vowel sound making the rhyme with "own" imperfect. Marilyn Bergman: "We said 'No, it's shone [long vowel sound].' And he said 'No, it's our language!' And we said: 'Yes, but it's our song.' So reluctantly, he sang shone [long vowel sound] and our rhyme was intact." However, in the finally released version Harrison sings "shone" with a short vowel.

Harrison's version had a single released in the US in July 1968 soon after the premiere of the film and similarly was released in the British Isles at the time of the film's 7 February 1969 premiere in the UK and Ireland.

As a result, it was a current UK release when "The Windmills of Your Mind" received an Academy Award nomination on 24 February 1969. Harrison's single debuted at No. 36 in the UK Top 50 of 4 March 1969 and had risen to No. 15—abetted by performances by Harrison on the 27 March 1969 broadcast of Top of the Pops and also on variety shows hosted by Rolf Harris and Scott Walker—when the song won the Academy Award on 14 April 1969. The award facilitated the Top Ten entry of Harrison's single on the UK chart of 22 April 1969 with its chart peak of No. 8 effected two weeks later.

"The Windmills of Your Mind" was performed on the Academy Awards ceremony broadcast of 14 April 1969 by José Feliciano; Noel Harrison would recall: "I was invited to sing it at the Academy Awards... but I was making a movie in England at the time, and the producer (who didn't like me) refused to let me go." The film which caused the scheduling conflict has been identified as Take a Girl Like You directed by Jonathan Miller.

== Dusty Springfield version ==
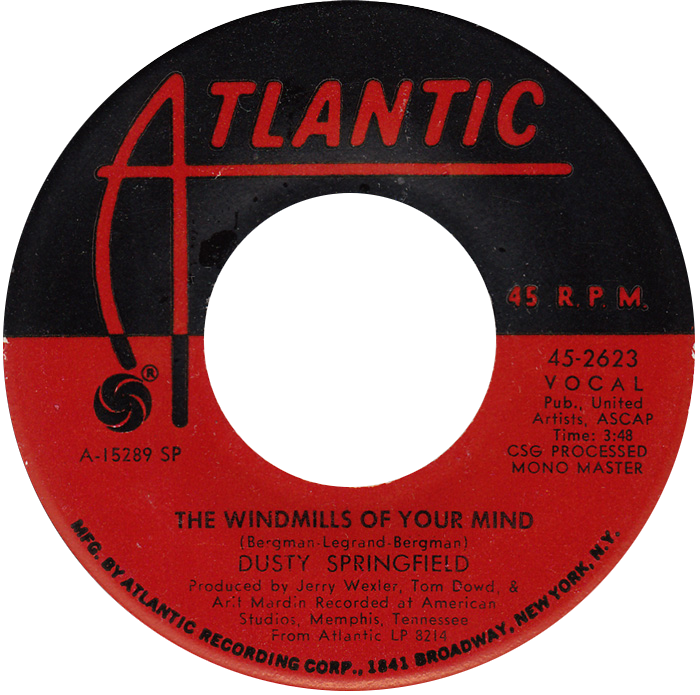
B-side label of Dusty Springfield's US vinyl single "I Don't Want to Hear It Anymore"

Jerry Wexler, president of Atlantic Records, heard "The Windmills of Your Mind" on the soundtrack of The Thomas Crown Affair and championed having Dusty Springfield record the song for her debut Atlantic album Dusty in Memphis, overcoming the singer's strong resistance; Springfield's friend and subsequent manager Vicki Wickham would allege: "Dusty always said she hated it because she couldn't identify with the words." During the first sessions for the track at American Sound Studio in Memphis, problems with getting the proper chords down arose, and at Springfield's suggestion the song was arranged so the first three verses were sung in a slower tempo than the original film version.

In April 1969, the third A-side release from Dusty in Memphis was announced as "I Don't Want to Hear It Anymore" with "The Windmills of Your Mind" as the B-side. However Wexler was prepared to promote "Windmills" as the A-side if it won the Oscar for Best Song, reportedly instructing mailroom clerks at Atlantic Records' New York City headquarters to listen to the Academy Awards broadcast the night of 14 April 1969. Hearing "The Windmills" announced as the Best Song winner was the clerks' cue to drive a station wagon loaded with 2500 copies of a double-sided promo single of Springfield's version – identified on the label as "Academy Award Winner" – to the New York City general post office, where the copies of the single were mailed out to key radio stations across the US. Although its Hot 100 debut was not effected until the 5 May 1969 issue of Billboard and then with a No. 99 ranking, Springfield's "The Windmills" made a rapid ascent to the Top 40 being ranked at No. 40 on the Hot 100 of 24 May 1969 only to stall over the subsequent three weeks peaking at No. 31 on the Hot 100 of 14 June 1969 with only one additional week of Hot 100 tenure, being ranked at No. 45 on the 21 June 1969 chart. On the Cash Box chart, the song rose as high as No. 22.

Local hit parades indicate that Springfield's "Windmills" had Top Ten impact in only select larger markets: Boston, Southern California, and Miami. The track did reach No. 3 on the Easy Listening chart in Billboard, a feat matched by Springfield's third subsequent single "Brand New Me" which therefore ties with "The Windmills" as having afforded Springfield her best-ever solo showing on a Billboard chart.

== José Feliciano version ==
"The Windmills of Your Mind" was recorded by José Feliciano for his 1969 album 10 to 23, and Feliciano performed the song on the Academy Awards ceremony broadcast of 14 April 1969. The song's original singer, Noel Harrison, would later opine of Feliciano's performance: "A wonderful musician and compelling singer, he made much too free with the beautiful melody in my humble opinion. But that's jazz." It was Feliciano's version of "The Windmills" which became a hit in the Netherlands, reaching No. 11 on the Dutch chart in November 1969. and No. 4 in the Turkish hit parade in April 1970.

== Chart history ==
=== Dusty Springfield ===
Chart (1969)	Peak position
Australia (Kent Music Report)	40
Canada RPM Adult Contemporary	5
Canada RPM Top Singles	21
Philippines	34
US Billboard Hot 100	31
US Billboard Adult Contemporary	3
US Cash Box Top 100	22

=== Noel Harrison ===
Chart (1969)	Peak position
New Zealand (Listener)	17
South Africa (Springbok)	5
UK Singles (OCC)	8

== Other versions ==
=== In English ===
- A 1977 episode of The Muppet Show starring Don Knotts featured a fast-paced version sung by an anxious three-legged "Screaming Thing" (performed by Jerry Nelson).
- Mel Tormé recorded the song in 1969. In 2025, this version was used in "Cold Harbor", the season two finale of the television series Severance.
- The American indie rock band Parenthetical Girls recorded the song on their 2008 album Entanglements.
- Eva Mendes recorded the song for a commercial (starring Mendes) for Angel perfume.

=== In French: "Les Moulins de mon cœur" ===
The lyrics for the French-language rendering of the song were written by Eddy Marnay and this version, entitled "Les Moulins de mon cœur" ("The Windmills of My Heart"), was first recorded in 1968 by Marcel Amont.

=== In other languages ===
"The Windmills of Your Mind" has also been rendered as "Cirkels", in Dutch, released as a single by Herman van Veen (1968), reaching the Top 40 in the Netherlands.

Russian, with clips from Soviet/Russian movies https://www.youtube.com/watch?v=7pe4H0v2DDY тайна склеенных страниц

== External links and references ==
- Lyrics, from The Thomas Crown Affair
