= Faithful (Dusty Springfield album) =

Studio album by Dusty Springfield
- Released: 7 April 2015
- Recorded: January – June 1971
- Studios: Century Sound Studios, New York City
- Genres: Pop, soul
- Length: 40:36
- Label: Real Gone Music (recorded for Atlantic Records)
- Producer: Jeff Barry

Dusty Springfield chronology
A Very Fine Love (1995)	Faithful (2015)	Longing (2025)

Professional ratings
Review scores
Source	Rating
AllMusic	4.5/5 stars

Faithful is the seventh album recorded by Dusty Springfield and was her planned third album for Atlantic Records, recorded in the first half of 1971. In April 2015, Faithful was released as her fifteenth and final studio album (on 7 April in the US and 13 April in the UK), 44 years after its planned release was shelved. It was the first posthumous studio album in Springfield's primary catalog, with 1974's Longing being released in 2025.

Two singles from the album, "I Believe in You" (b/w "Someone Who Cares"), and "Haunted" (b/w "Nothing Is Forever", a track not intended for the album) were released in the US in late 1971 but failed to chart nationally. Due to poor response from the two singles, and a rumoured falling out with Atlantic executives, Springfield's contract with the company was not renewed, and the planned album was shelved and never given a catalogue number or title.

Faithful was a working title, taken from the name of an album track, "I'll Be Faithful", which had possibly been under consideration as a third single. A fire in the mid-seventies at one of Atlantic's storage sites was thought to have destroyed the Faithful session tapes, leaving only the two singles (and possible third single, as a mono mix existed into the nineties) and their B-sides from the sessions intact. However, in the nineties the album's producer, Jeff Barry, was asked about the sessions and revealed he had kept completed stereo mixes of all the tracks. Most were released as bonus tracks on the Rhino/Atlantic deluxe remastered edition of Dusty in Memphis in 1999, though "Someone Who Cares" and "Nothing Is Forever" had been released on Springfield's UK-only 1972 album See All Her Faces.

The proper release of the album in April 2015 included an additional bonus track, "Nothing Is Forever", which was the B-side to the aforementioned single "Haunted". The release of the album as a standalone work, rather than a collection of bonus tracks, leaves only the planned 1974 release Longing as her lone remaining unreleased album.

== Track listing ==
1. "I'll Be Faithful" (Ned W. Albright, Michael F. Soles, Steven Soles) – 2:59
2. "Live Here with You" (Gilbert Slavin, Michael F. Soles) – 2:44
3. "Haunted" (Jeff Barry, Bobby Bloom) – 2:24
4. "Someone Who Cares" (Alex Harvey) – 2:54
5. "Make It with You" (David Gates) – 3:13
6. "Love Shine Down" (Neil Brian Goldberg, Gilbert Slavin) – 2:21
7. "I Believe in You" (Jeff Barry) – 3:29
8. "Have a Good Life Baby" (Neil Goldberg) – 3:09
9. "Natchez Trace" (Neil Goldberg, Gilbert Slavin) – 2:57
10. "All the King's Horses" (Neil Goldberg, Dusty Springfield, Joseph Renzetti) – 3:09
11. "You've Got a Friend" (Carole King) – 5:27
12. "I Found My Way Through the Darkness" (Gilbert Slavin, Michael F. Soles) – 3:16

Bonus Tracks -

1. "Nothing Is Forever" (Jeff Barry, Bobby Bloom) – 2:34
