= Cameo (album) =

Studio album by Dusty Springfield
- Released: 10 February 1973 in (US), 11 May 1973 in (UK)
- Recorded: July–October 1972
- Studio: ABC, Los Angeles, California
- Genre: Pop
- Length: 35:12
- Label: ABC Dunhill Records
- Producer: Steve Barri, Brian Potter, Dennis Lambert

Dusty Springfield chronology
See All Her Faces (1972)	Cameo (1973)	Longing (1974)

Singles from Cameo
- 1. "Mama's Little Girl" Released: May 1973 (USA); 2. "Who Gets Your Love" Released: February 1973 (USA) / 23 March 1973 (UK); 3. "Learn To Say Goodbye" Released: June 1973 (USA) / August 1973 (UK)

Cameo is the eighth studio album released by singer Dusty Springfield, released in 1973.

== Writing and recording ==
The album was recorded in the United States between July and October 1972. Cameo was produced by Steve Barri, Dennis Lambert and Brian Potter who later went on to write and produce major hits for among others Glen Campbell, The Four Tops and The Tavares. The album also included material written by Alan O'Day, David Gates, Nickolas Ashford, Valerie Simpson and Van Morrison and among the all-star line up of musicians contributing were Hal Blaine, Paul Humphrey, Larry Carlton, Wilton Felder, Carol Kaye, Victor Feldman, Michael Omartian, Venetta Fields and Clydie King.

== Release and promotion ==
Cameo is Springfield's first LP for the ABC Dunhill Records label, which released it in the United States first in February 1973. It was released in the UK (by Philips Records) three months later in May.

The album was a commercial failure in 1973 – charting neither in the UK nor the US. A planned second album on the ABC Dunhill label with the working title of Elements (eventually re-titled Longing), was started, but never finished, due to Springfield's personal problems at the time. Most of the uncompleted album Longing can also be found on the Hip-O Records compilation Beautiful Soul, released in the United States in 2001.

Cameo was digitally remastered and released on CD for the first time in Europe by Mercury/Universal Music in 2002, though not containing any bonus tracks. Due to its relative obscurity upon the LP's initial release in 1973, Cameo is considered to be one of the rarer titles of Springfield's official catalogue/discography, and hard to find on any format, though its increased popularity in recent years due to the CD release and digital music file sharing has alleviated that difficulty to a good degree.

Prior to its release in May 1973 in the UK Springfield made a brief public appearance in the UK doing dates in the Provinces up in the North, doing a TV appearance on They Sold a Million and also doing two live shows at The London Palladium that January to make up for the Talk of the Town fiasco. This live appearance would be her last tour or live show she would do for another 6 years and her last public appearance in the UK until 5 years later in February 1978 for a promotional trip for her new album It Begins Again. During the years between Cameo and It Begins Again, Springfield remained very much off the radar and was in a period of what many describe as her "wilderness years".

In the US Springfield made a few television appearances but only performed two songs from Cameo. The first being "Of All the Things" on The Bobby Darin Show and the second being "Mama's Little Girl" on The Tonight Show - With Johnny Carson.

== Critical reception ==
Professional ratings
Review scores
Source	Rating
AllMusic	4/5 stars
Christgau's Record Guide	B

Reviewing in Christgau's Record Guide: Rock Albums of the Seventies (1981), Robert Christgau highlighted the songs "Of All the Things" and "The Other Side of Life", while writing of Springfield: "Simultaneously gushy and ladylike, she sings like the beautiful maidservant of men's vainest and most shameful fantasies--always the supplicant, always in love. Yet at the same time she manages to elicit sisterly sympathy from other women. Lambert and Potter have mixed the orchestra way too high on this record, but for these guys, who usually write banal melodies that stick so stubbornly you hate them for it, the tunes are complex and likable. Maybe that's because L&P adjusted them for a tough human being who convinced them mid-session that she wasn't just some backup chick doing a solo spot."

== Track listing ==
All tracks composed by Dennis Lambert and Brian Potter; except where indicated
Side one

1. "Who Gets Your Love" – 3:28
2. "Breakin' Up a Happy Home" – 3:36
3. "Easy Evil" (Alan O'Day) – 2:55
4. "Mama's Little Girl" – 3:31
5. "The Other Side of Life" (David Gates) – 2:43
6. "Comin' and Goin'" – 3:12

Side two

1. "I Just Wanna Be There" (Nickolas Ashford, Valerie Simpson) – 2:43
2. "Who Could Be Loving You Other Than Me?" (Willie Hutchinson) – 3:04
3. "Tupelo Honey" (Van Morrison) – 4:02
4. "Of All the Things" – 3:07
5. "Learn to Say Goodbye" (from the ABC Movie of the Week, Say Goodbye, Maggie Cole) (Hugo Montenegro, Bradford Craig) – 2:51

== Unused recordings ==
1. "Ben" (Walter Scharf, Don Black)
2. "I Can See Clearly Now" (Johnny Nash)
3. "It's All Been Said Before"
4. "When The Boys Come Out to Play" - Recorded during the Cameo sessions but unissued and subsequently lost or possibly destroyed upon the end of Dusty's contract with ABC/Dunhill in June 1975.
5. "I Just Wanna Be There" [Alternate Take] (Nickolas Ashford, Valerie Simpson) - Features longer intro and fade; unreleased though master tapes exist.
6. "Tupelo Honey" [Alternate Take] (Van Morrison) - Features different vocals; unreleased though master tapes exist.
7. "Learn to Say Goodbye" [Original Recording] (Hugo Montenegro, Bradford Craig) - As featured in the 1972 made-for-TV drama, the ABC Movie of the Week, Say Goodbye, Maggie Cole. The track was re-recorded for the Cameo LP. Aside from its inclusion in the movie the original recording remains unreleased.
8. "Six Million Dollar Man" (theme from The Six Million Dollar Man) (Glen A. Larson) - Recorded in 1973. Featured in the opening and closing credits of the Wine, Women & War and The Solid Gold Kidnapping made-for-TV movies and in the promotion of the series; replaced by an instrumental theme for the weekly series. Aside from its inclusion in the movies and adverts the original recording remains unreleased.
9. "The Other Side of Life" [2005 B.J. Thomas "duet" mix] (David Gates) - B.J. Thomas recorded the song in the 1970s during his tenure with Scepter Records. In 2005 a mix was created mixing Springfield's Cameo vocal into Thomas's Scepter recording. Both the B.J. Thomas solo recording and the "duet" mix remain unreleased.

== Personnel and production ==
- Dusty Springfield – vocals
- Steve Barri – record producer
- Dennis Lambert – producer, keyboards
- Brian Potter – producer, percussion
- Hal Blaine, Paul Humphrey – drums
- Ben Benay, Larry Carlton, David Bennett Cohen – guitar
- Wilton Felder, Carol Kaye – bass guitar
- Victor Feldman – percussion
- Michael Lang – keyboards
- Michael Omartian – keyboards, string, horn and flute arrangements
- Clydie King – backing vocals
- Venetta Fields – backing vocals
- Sherlie Matthews – backing vocals
- Myrna Matthews – backing vocals
- Sid Sharp – concertmaster
- Jimmie Haskell – string arrangements

== Charts ==
Album – Billboard (United States)

Year	Chart	Position
1973	Pop Albums Billboard '200'	Did not chart^
1973	Bubbling Under US Billboard '200'	5

Singles – Billboard (United States)

Year	Single	Chart	Position
1973	"Who Gets Your Love"	Pop Singles	121
1973	"Who Gets Your Love"	US Cashbox	93
1973	"Mama's Little Girl"	Pop Singles	118
1973	"Mama's Little Girl"	Adult Contemporary	33
1973	"Learn to Say Goodbye"^^	Adult Contemporary	33

^At the time of the album's release, Billboard Magazine maintained a "Bubbling Under" Album chart, for albums that had not yet entered the Billboard Top 200 Album chart. Cameo peaked at #5 on this chart.

^^"Learn to Say Goodbye" was initially the B side of "Mama's Little Girl". The single was later flipped, with "Learn to Say Goodbye" becoming the A side.

== Sources ==
- Howes, Paul (2001). The Complete Dusty Springfield. London: Reynolds & Hearn Ltd. ISBN 1-903111-24-2.
