= Eric Records =

American record label

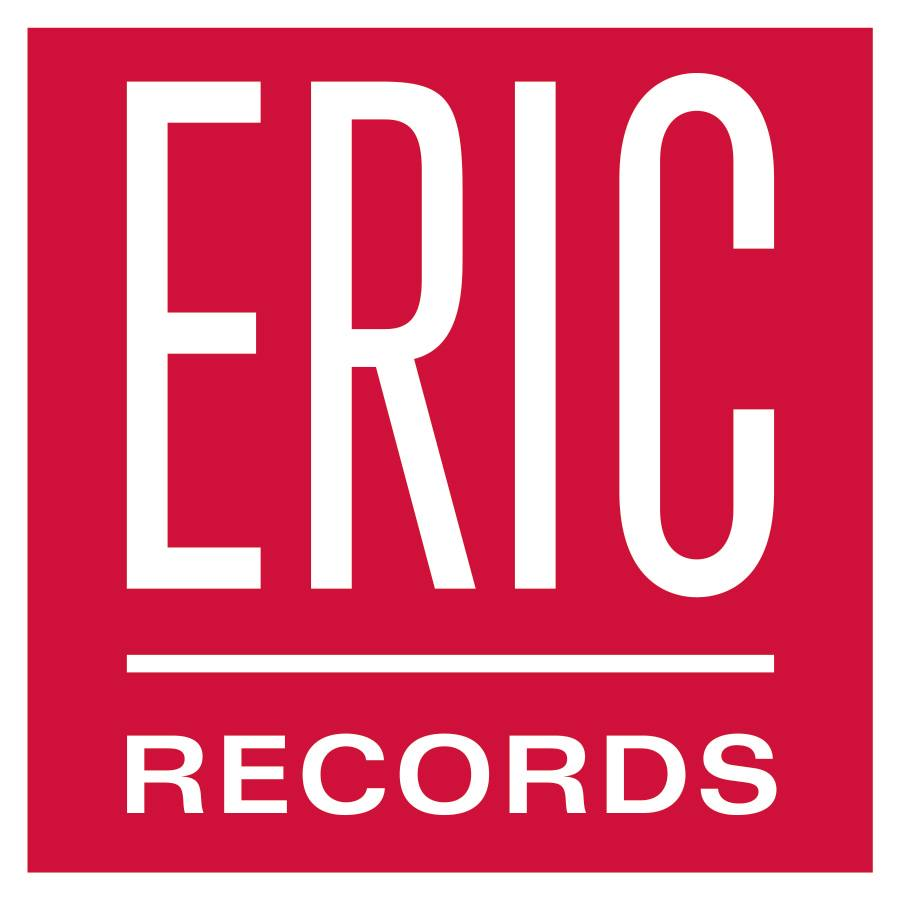
Logo of Eric Records

Eric Records is an American record company that produced singles from 1968 to 1996, mainly with reissues of successful oldies, continuing today with compact disc compilations.

== History ==
Eric Records was founded in 1968 by Bill Buster in Philadelphia with the intention to re-release old songs of popular pop music in the original version as heard on the radio. He started with The Paris Sisters, of which he brought their successful titles "I Love How You Love Me" and "He Knows I Love Him Too Much" of 1961 and 1962 to the market. As a result, Buster published a series of evergreens and lesser-known titles. While the majority of the titles were number-one hits and re-released between 1950 and 1979, others such as Jerry Butler's "For Your Precious Love" (ranked 99 in the Billboard pop chart) also hit the market.

In 1974, the company was relocated to New Jersey. When vinyl records were superseded by the compact disc in the early 1990s, Eric Records switched its production to compact discs in 1996.

=== Compilation series ===
- Big Band Releases
- Complete Hits
- Hard to Find 45s On CD
- Hard to Find Instrumentals
- Hard to Find Jukebox Classics (via Hit Parade Records)
- Teen Time
