= God Only Knows (1954 song) =

Single by The Capris
- B-side: "That's What You're Doing To Me"
- Released: 1954
- Genre: Doo wop
- Label: Gotham 304; Gotham G-7304
- Songwriter: Ruben Wright

The Capris singles chronology
| "God Only Knows" (1954) | "It Was Moonglow" (1955) |

"God Only Knows" was a regional hit for Philadelphia Doo wop group The Capris. It was their debut single for the group and was written by Ruben Wright. The song also had a dramatic effect on Motown singer Marvin Gaye. It has been covered by other artists as well.

== Background ==
The song was written by Ruben Wright. It was hastily written and together with five other songs it was recorded by The Capris with their very recently acquired female singer Renee Hinton on lead vocal. According to Charlie Stroud (who was to leave the group before Renee Hinton joined), he sang the song first and didn't like it. So it was given to Ruben Wright to sing the lead. Wright then gave it to Renee Hinton.

The singer is singing about how only God can know how deep her feelings are and how she is worried that their relationship is breaking up. She also tells her lover that only God would know what would happen if they did. On hearing the song, Marvin Gaye said that it fell from the heavens and hit him between the eyes. With so much soul and hurt, he related to the story.

It was released on Gotham G-304 on 78 RPM, and Gotham G-7304 on 45 RPM. The 1954 and 1956 issues have different color labels.

== Chart positions ==
Chart positions
| Week ending | Position | Region |
|---|---|---|
| August 18, 1954 | 6 | Philadelphia |
| September 8, 1954 | 10 | Philadelphia |
| September 15, 1954 | 4; 7 | Baltimore / Washington; Philadelphia |
| October 13, 1954 | 5; 8 | Baltimore / Washington; New York |
| October 27, 1954 | 3 | Baltimore / Washington |
| November 3, 1954 | 10 | Baltimore / Washington |
| November 10, 1954 | 4 | Baltimore / Washington |
| December 1, 1954 | 10 | Cincinnati |
| December 15, 1954 | 8 | Baltimore / Washington |

.

== Other versions ==
The song was re-recorded by another doo wop group called The Crystals in 1955. This came about because of it being #10 on the regional R&B charts of Cincinnati in December 1954. Syd Nathan who was the owner of Deluxe, a Cincinnati record label, rushed The Crystals, an all-male group, into the studio to record it. It was released on DeLuxe 6077. In 1961, the song title was slightly changed. "Heaven Only Knows"/"My Darling" was released on the Sheryl label. The actual group that was on the single was The Larks. However, the credited artist credited on the recording was Cleopatra. Then in 1963, again with the title as "Heaven Only Knows", a version by Little Cheryl. The female lead was similar to that of the original.

== Releases ==
78 RPM
| Title | Release info | Year | Notes |
|---|---|---|---|
| "God Only Knows" / "That's What You're Doing To Me" | Gotham 304 | 1954 | |

45 RPM Singles
| Title | Release info | Year | Notes |
|---|---|---|---|
| "God Only Knows" / "That's What You're Doing To Me" | Gotham G-7304 | 1954 | |
| "God Only Knows" / "That's What You're Doing To Me" | Lost-Nite L-112 | 1964 | Re-release |
| "God Only Knows" / "That's What You're Doing To Me | Collectables COL 1001 | 1978 | Re-release |

45 RPM Singles Other versions
| Artist | Title | Release info | Year | Notes |
|---|---|---|---|---|
| The Crystals | Deluxe 45-6077 | 1955 | | |
| Cleopatra | "Heaven Only Knows" / "My Darling" | Sheryl 335 | 1961 | |
| Little Cheryl | "Can't We Just Be Friends" / "Heaven Only Knows" | Cameo C-270 | 1963 | |

Appears on
| Artist | Title | Release info | Year | F'mat | Notes |
|---|---|---|---|---|---|
| Various artists | For Lovers Only | Lost Nite Records LP 102 | 1964 | | |
| Various artists | Oldies From The Past | Lost Nite Records LP-110 | 1965 | | |
| The Capris | Gotham Recording Stars The Capris | Collectables CLP 5000 | 1990 | LP | |
| The Capris | 1954-1958 | Flyright Records FLY CD 56 | 1993 | CD | |
| The Capris | Best Of The Capris | Go GO-1000 | | | |
| Various artists | Spotlite On Gotham Records Vol 1 | Collectables COL-CD-5633; The Spotlite Series | 1995 | CD | |
| Various artists | Collectables Presents For Collectors Only; Volume 1 "The Rarities" | Collectables COL-7003 | | 2LP | |
| Various artists | Street Corner Symphonies Volume 6 : 1954 | Bear Family Records BCD17284; Series: Street Corner Symphonies – Volume 6: 1954 | 2012 | CD | |
