= The Capris (Philadelphia group) =

American 1950s doo-wop group

- Origin: Philadelphia
- Years active: 1950s
- Labels: Gotham Records; 20th Century
- Past members: Ruben Wright; Charlie Stroud; Eddie Warner; Harrison Scott; Bobby Smart; Renee Hinton; Herb Johnson; Fred Hale

The Capris were a 1950s doo-wop group from Philadelphia who started out in their teens. They consisted of four males and a female. They recorded singles for the Gotham Records label. The song that they are most known for is "God Only Knows".

== Background ==
The group started out in the early 1950s as The Uniques. They all came from the same neighborhood. Their early line-up consisted of Ruben Wright on piano, Harrison Scott on alto sax, Robert "Bobby" Smart on guitar, Gus Crawford on drums and a bass player called Jerome, together with a male singer whose name has now been lost to time. Later, as The Capris, they were a male vocal quintet, originally comprising Ruben Wright, Charlie Stroud, Eddie Warner, Harrison Scott and Bobby Smart. At that time the ages of the members of the group ranged from 15 to 16. After Charlie Stroud departed, they carried on for a little while as a quartet, but eventually they looked for a replacement for him and found one in Renee Hinton, who had been singing in a girl group, The Lovettes. It was Ruben Wright who came up with The Capris' name. Their early rehearsal venues included the home of Hinton's parents, because they happened to own a piano. Herb Johnson also sang with the group.

== Career ==
In June 1954, the group were signed to Gotham. The group recorded the original song "God Only Knows", featuring Renee Hinton's lead. They also recorded five other songs, which included "Too Poor To Love", "Let's Linger A While", and "That's What You're Doing To Me".

Their debut song, "God Only Knows", got good airplay on the East Coast and became a local hit. The group also appeared on radio and television.

Two singles following their debut single were released by Gotham, "It Was Moonglow" with the B-side "Too Poor To Love" in late 1954, and then "It's a Miracle" with "Let's Linger Awhile". The singles never attracted much attention, and they were not covered in the Billboard reviews.

In the mid-1950s, Ruben Wright and other members of the group entered into military service. After having returned in or around 1958, they re-grouped and took on Fred Hale as a replacement for Harrison Scott, who was now touring with another band. With Renee Hinton on lead, they recorded "My Weakness" with the B-side "Yes, My Baby, Please", which was released on Irvin Basllen's 20th Century label. That record too was not very successful, and the group disbandeded.

For a time, Renee Hinton went back to her old group, The Lovettes, who by this time had changed their name to The Laraes and did the show rounds at roller-skating rinks.

== Later years ==
=== 1950s to 1970s ===
Ruben Wright recorded at least eight singles, beginning in 1958 with "Love Is Gone" and "Girls Make Me Nervous", released on the Wynne label. During the 1960s, he recorded five singles for Capitol. One of the Capitol singles became a regional hit. The Luther Randolph arranged / Marvin Holtz produced "I'm Walking Out On You" made to the Top 30 in Baltimore. His last single was "La La La" with "I'm Gonna Have My Day", released on the Virtue label around 1969/1970.

=== 1980s to 2000s ===
In 1981, a Doris Browne single "Until The End Of Time" / "Why Don't You Love Me Now, Now, Now?" was re-released on the Collectables record label. The record, originally released on Gotham G-296 in 1953, was credited to Doris Browne with the Doc Bagby Orchestra. This 1981 Collectables release was credited to Doris Brown and the Capris.

During the 1980s, Charlie Stroud sang with The Omega 5 Maestros, an R&B a cappella group. In 1985, the Capris got back together. Fred Hale replaced Harrison Scott and Dwight Jones from the Omega 5 Maestros replaced Bobby Smart.

In 1986, Eddie Warner was suffering from cancer; he died soon after. Charlie Stroud and radio DJ and music historian Charlie Horner visited him at his home shortly before he died.

In January 1987 Charlie Stroud died of a massive stroke.

Also around that time, Renee Hinton, backed by The Castelles, sang the Capris' songs at an oldies event hosted by DJ Charlie Horner.

At the time American Singing Groups: A History from 1940s to Today was being written by Jay Warner, Ruben Wright was still playing piano in Philadelphia. Renee Hiton was then singing in three different Philadelphia church choirs.

== Discography ==
78 RPM singles
Title	Release info	Year	Notes
"God Only Knows" / "That's What You're Doing To Me"	Gotham 304	1954	
"It Was Moonglow" / "Too Poor To Love"	Gotham 306	1955	
"It's A Miracle" / "Let's Linger A While"	Gotham 308	1956	

45 RPM singles
Title	Release info	Year	Notes
"God Only Knows" / "That's What You're Doing To Me"	Gotham G-7304	1954	
"It Was Moonglow" / "Too Poor To Love"	Gotham G-306	1955	
"It's A Miracle" / "Let's Linger A While"	Gotham G-7308	1955	
"My Weakness" / "Yes, My Baby, Please"	20th Century TC 1201	1960	

45 RPM singles (re-releases)
Title	Release info	Year	Notes
"God Only Knows" / "That's What You're Doing To Me"	Lost-Nite L-112	1964	
"God Only Knows" / "That's What You're Doing To Me	Collectables COL 1001	1978	
"It Was Moonglow" / "Too Poor To Love"	Collectables C1002	?	
"It's A Miracle" / "Let's Linger A While"	Collectables C1003	?	
"My Weakness" / "Yes, My Baby, Please"	Collectables C1004	?	
"It's A Miracle" / "Let's Linger A While"	Delltone; Oldies Series G-308	?	

45 RPM singles (disputed)Some sources place these releases in the discography while others do not.
Title	Release info	Year	Notes
"Oh My Darling" / "Rock Pretty Baby"	Lifetime 1001/1002	?	
"Oh My Darling" / "Rock Pretty Baby"	Candelite 422	?	

Albums
Title	Release info	Year	F	Notes
The Best Of The Capris	Go GO-1000		LP	Tracks "All The Way Now" & "Rock Pretty Baby" are by The Moniques
Gotham Recording Stars The Capris	Collectables CLP 5000	1990	LP	
The Capris 1954-1958	Flyright Records FLY CD 56	1993	CD	
