= Concrete (Pet Shop Boys album) =

Live album by Pet Shop Boys
- Released: 23 October 2006
- Recorded: 8 May 2006
- Venue: Mermaid Theatre (London)
- Length: 86:55
- Label: Parlophone
- Producer: Trevor Horn

Pet Shop Boys chronology
Fundamental (2006)	Concrete (2006)	Disco 4 (2007)

Concrete is a live album by English synth-pop duo Pet Shop Boys, released on 23 October 2006 as a double CD. It was the duo's first live album. The concert was recorded for broadcast on BBC Radio 2 in May 2006, with accompaniment by the BBC Concert Orchestra and special guests including Frances Barber, Rufus Wainwright, and Robbie Williams.

== Background and recording ==
The performance recorded for the album took place at the Mermaid Theatre in London on 8 May 2006, as an exclusive for broadcast on BBC Radio 2's Sold on Song programme on 27 May. Attendance, totalling 600, was by invitation or through competitions held by Radio 2 and the band's official website. The event was hosted by the BBC's Stuart Maconie.

The 27 May Radio 2 broadcast included an interview conducted by Maconie, but excluded four songs from the running order ("You Only Tell Me You Love Me When You're Drunk", "After All", "Numb", and "Dreaming of the Queen"). The full concert was later broadcast on BBC 6 Music on 28 August.

The concert was a launch event for the Pet Shop Boys' new studio album, Fundamental, released on 22 May 2006. Trevor Horn, the producer of Fundamental, was the music director for the concert and also produced Concrete.

=== Song selection and performance ===
Due to the presence of the orchestra, the setlist was composed to consist of songs originally recorded with an orchestra. Consequently, in addition to an extensive selection of songs from Fundamental, various non-studio album tracks were chosen, including the arrangement of "Rent" from the Liza Minnelli album Results, originally arranged by Angelo Badalamenti; "After All", the portion of the band's Battleship Potemkin soundtrack that accompanies the Odessa Steps sequence from the film (performed with the scene projected on a screen in the background); "Friendly Fire", from the Closer to Heaven musical; and "Nothing Has Been Proved", the theme song from Scandal, also arranged by Badalamenti. "West End Girls" and "It's a Sin" were the only exceptions to the rule, and were reworked to integrate the orchestra.

Neil Tennant introduced the songs with anecdotes, which appear on the album. Special guests sang lead vocals on three of the songs. Rufus Wainwright performed "Casanova in Hell" from Fundamental. Frances Barber, who had played the lead role in Closer to Heaven, sang "Friendly Fire". On "Jealousy", the earliest song written by Pet Shop Boys, Tennant recited the opening quote from Shakespeare's Othello, and Robbie Williams sang the rest.

Opera singer Sally Bradshaw reprised her vocals from the 1988 hit, "Left to My Own Devices". Other guest musicians included Anne Dudley on piano, Steve Lipson and Phil Palmer on guitar, and Lol Creme and Sylvia Mason-James on backing vocals.

== Release ==
Pet Shop Boys agreed to release a live album to pay for the concert. The album was initially announced under the name Concert, but it was changed to Concrete, which was the duo's original preferred title. It debuted at its peak position of 61 on the UK Albums Chart. In the United States, Concrete was released as a digital download by Astralwerks on 17 May 2011.

== Critical reception ==
Professional ratings
Review scores
Source	Rating
AllMusic	3/5 stars
MusicOMH	4/5 stars

In a four-star review for MusicOMH, Michael Hubbard stated that Pet Shop Boys "have redefined what "live album" means" and added, "What's also clear from hearing this record is that to dismiss Pet Shop Boys merely as an '80s electropop duo would be to give them scant justice. Concrete feels like a contemporary classical cultural study". Cam Lindsay of Exclaim! commented, "the first live album by pop music's most stylish duo is an extraordinary achievement in capturing the artist in their element". In a review published on Blogcritics following the US release in 2011, Michael Melchor wrote: "Much of the recording — due in part to [Trevor] Horn's trademark pristine production and in part to the fact that the Pet Shop Boys sound already lends itself well to that — sounds wonderful. This makes a strong case for one of the best-sounding live albums ever, as every note, instrument and nuance are loud and crystal clear".

David Jeffries of AllMusic gave the album three stars, noting: "With a generally deadpan singer and another guy behind a bank of synthesizers, the Pet Shop Boys just aren't built for live albums, even if the songs are exquisite, there's an orchestra behind them, and some very special guests appear. While the duo can deliver in a live setting, the experience relies heavily on the visual". He concluded, "While that's probably not enough to keep everyone occupied, fans and fetishists will embrace this curio".

== Track listing ==
All tracks are written by Neil Tennant and Chris Lowe except "Numb" by Diane Warren and "It's Alright" by Sterling Void, Marshall Jefferson, and Paris Brightledge.

Disc One
No.	Title	Original orchestral arrangement	Length
1.	"Left to My Own Devices" (featuring Sally Bradshaw)	Richard Niles	8:37
2.	"Rent"	Angelo Badalamenti	3:56
3.	"You Only Tell Me You Love Me When You're Drunk"	Craig Armstrong	3:31
4.	"The Sodom and Gomorrah Show"	Anne Dudley	5:33
5.	"Casanova in Hell" (sung by Rufus Wainwright)	Nick Ingman	3:40
6.	"After All"	Torsten Rasch	7:56
7.	"Friendly Fire" (sung by Frances Barber)	Armstrong	3:57
8.	"Integral"	Ingman	4:01
Total length:			41:11

Disc Two
No.	Title	Original orchestral arrangement	Length
1.	"Numb"	Steve Sidwell	5:03
2.	"It's Alright" (featuring Sally Bradshaw)	Ingman	5:03
3.	"Luna Park"	Ingman	6:21
4.	"Nothing Has Been Proved"	Badalamenti	4:40
5.	"Jealousy" (sung by Robbie Williams)	Harold Faltermeyer	5:57
6.	"Dreaming of the Queen"	Dudley	5:28
7.	"It's a Sin"	Ingman	5:18
8.	"Indefinite Leave to Remain"	Ingman	2:59
9.	"West End Girls"	Ingman	4:55
Total length:			45:44

== Personnel ==
Pet Shop Boys

- Neil Tennant
- Chris Lowe

Orchestra

- The BBC Concert Orchestra
- Nick Ingman – conductor

Guest singers

- Rufus Wainwright
- Frances Barber
- Robbie Williams
- Sally Bradshaw

Additional musicians

- Trevor Horn – music director, bass, backing vocals
- Pete Gleadall – programming
- Anne Dudley – piano, keyboards
- Phil Palmer – guitar
- Steve Lipson – guitar
- Paul Robinson – drums
- Lol Creme – backing vocals
- Andy Caine – backing vocals
- Lucinda Barry – backing vocals
- Sylvia Mason-James – backing vocals

Technical personnel

- Trevor Horn – production
- Tim Weidner – engineering, mixing at Sarm Studios
- Rob Orton – engineering, editing
- Rob Smith – pre-production engineering
- Metropolis – mastering
- Ruth Beazley – production for BBC Radio 2
- Paul Long – engineering for BBC Radio 2

Artwork

- Farrow/PSB – design
- John Ross – architectural photography
- Elliott Franks – concert photography

== Chart performance ==
Chart performance for Concrete
Chart (2006)	Peak position
German Albums (Offizielle Top 100)	76
UK Albums (OCC)	61
