= Minimal (song) =

2006 single by Pet Shop Boys

Single by Pet Shop Boys

from the album Fundamental
- B-side: "In Private"; "Blue on Blue"; "No Time for Tears"
- Released: 24 July 2006
- Genre: Electropop; synth-pop
- Length: 4:21 (album version); 3:38 (radio edit)
- Label: Parlophone
- Songwriters: Neil Tennant; Chris Lowe
- Producer: Trevor Horn

Pet Shop Boys singles chronology
"I'm with Stupid" (2006)	"Minimal" (2006)	"Numb" (2006)

Music video
- "Minimal" on YouTube

"Minimal" is a song by English synth-pop duo Pet Shop Boys from their ninth studio album, Fundamental (2006). It was released on 24 July 2006 as the album's second single. "Minimal" reached number 19 on the UK Singles Chart, becoming the duo's 37th top-20 entry in the United Kingdom, and it was the number five Hot Dance Club Play Track of 2007 on Billboard's year-end chart.

== Background and composition ==
"Minimal" was originally announced as the first single to precede the release of Fundamental. It was Parlophone's preferred lead single after the Pet Shop Boys' suggestion of "The Sodom and Gomorrah Show" was rejected. "I'm with Stupid" was ultimately chosen for the leadoff spot, with "Minimal" as the second single.

The lyrics, built around a chant of "M-I-N-I-M-A-L", are an abstract description of expressions of minimalism, such as "more is less" and "an empty box, an open space". This is contradicted by the upbeat, busy instrumentation and production.

== Release ==
Minimal was released on 24 July 2006 and sold 9,336 copies in the UK its first week. Debuting at number 19 on the UK Singles Chart, it was Pet Shop Boys' 38th top 40 hit, which was the most for any duo at the time; it was also their lowest charting single since "Was It Worth It?" peaked at 24 in 1991.

The single came in CD, Enhanced CD, and DVD formats as well as two digital download packages and a limited-edition 7-inch vinyl. The two-track CD single was a Minimax CD with a white centre and a transparent outer rim. The B-side, "In Private", was a new version of a song originally written for Dusty Springfield, this time recorded as a duet between Neil Tennant and Elton John and remixed by Stuart Crichton.

The Enhanced maxi single had remixes by Tocadisco and M-Factor in addition to the radio edit of "Minimal". It came with U-MYX software for creating one's own remix of "Minimal", which could be uploaded to the PSB microsite to share with others. The DVD single included the music video and a remix by Telex as well as a new track, "Blue on Blue", and a 7-inch mix of the song "No Time for Tears" from the duo's 2005 Battleship Potemkin soundtrack. The two-track 7-inch on clear vinyl was released a week later on 31 July.

In the United States, promotional copies for club play were released by Rhino Records. On 16 December 2006, "Minimal" entered the Hot Dance Club Play chart, where it spent 21 weeks, peaking at number three on 24 February 2007. It was the fifth-ranked Hot Dance Club Play Track of 2007.

=== Artwork ===
The single covers, designed by Mark Farrow, continued the use of neon tubing from the album artwork. For "Minimal", the lettering was created using empty, clear tubes which were photographed from different angles by John Ross. The CDs had a white background and the DVD cover was black.

=== Promotion ===
"Minimal" was named Record of the Week on the Colin and Edith show on BBC Radio 1 at the end of July. The single was A-listed at Radio 2 and topped the station's airplay chart on 12 August. It was also on the A-list at Capital Radio.

A realtone ringtone of "Minimal" was available to purchase.

== Critical reception ==
According to Music Week, the first single, "I'm with Stupid", had "divided fans", but "Minimal" was "one of the album's stronger songs, stripping down the duo's trademark electropop sound into a beautifully sleek package that is very 2006".

Michael Hubbard of MusicOMH wrote: "Electropop slicker than Minimal, the second single from Pet Shop Boys' strongest album in a decade, Fundamental, is hard to imagine ... The chorus vocoder does remind of Kraftwerk, but the rest of the production is several dance steps removed from the minimalism of the Dusseldorf legends". He concluded, "The lyrics make no sense at all, so just dance".

== Music video ==
The music video for "Minimal" was directed by Don Cameron and filmed in Paris. It features a pair of dancers (Keir and Thailai Knight) manoeuvering to form the letters of the chorus, while Neil Tennant and Chris Lowe perform in front of a light display of vertical and horizontal fluorescent tubes.

== Live performances ==
"Minimal" was performed on the Fundamental Tour in a medley with "Shopping" (1987)—another song in which the title word is spelled out in the chorus. It is featured on the concert film DVD Cubism.

== Track listings ==
- UK CD single (CDR 6708)
1. "Minimal" (radio edit) – 3:38
2. "In Private" (7-inch mix) – 4:13
- UK CD maxi single (CDRS 6708)
1. "Minimal" (radio edit) – 3:38
2. "Minimal" (Tocadisco's Sunday at Space Remix) – 8:00
3. "Minimal" (M Factor Remix) – 8:45
4. "Minimal" (U-MYX software)
- UK DVD single (DVDR 6708)
1. "Minimal" (Telex Hell mix) – 6:18
2. "Blue on Blue" – 3:13
3. "No Time for Tears" (7-inch mix) – 3:38
4. "Minimal" (music video)
- UK 7-inch single (R 6708)

A. "Minimal" (radio edit) – 3:38
B. "In Private" (7-inch mix) – 4:13

- UK promotional CD maxi single (00946 371144 2 1)
1. "Minimal" (radio edit) – 3:40
2. "Minimal" (Tocadisco's Sunday at Space Mix) – 8:04
3. "Minimal" (M Factor mix) – 8:49
4. "Minimal" (M Factor dub) – 7:44
5. "Minimal" (Tiga's M-I-N-I-M-A-L remix) – 5:38
6. "Minimal" (Tiga's M-I-N-I-M-A-L dub) – 5:38
7. "Minimal" (Superchumbo's Light & Shade dub) – 8:28
8. "Minimal" (Telex Hell remix) – 6:19
9. "Minimal" (Telex Heaven remix) – 4:29
10. "In Private" (Tomcraft 7-inch mix) – 3:51

=== Additional remixes ===
On 25 July 2006, Chris Lowe created a new version of the track titled "Chris Lowe Summer Mix" using the U-MYX software that came with the maxi-CD and uploaded it onto the Pet Shop Boys U-MYX microsite.

A remix of "Minimal" by Lobe is on Fundamentalism, the limited edition bonus CD of Fundamental. A remix by Radio Slave appeared on the B-side of a promotional 12-inch with two remixes of "Psychological" on the A-side by Ewan Pearson. These were part of the "Numb" promotion.

== Personnel ==
Personnel are adapted from the liner notes of "Minimal".

Pet Shop Boys

- Chris Lowe
- Neil Tennant

Additional musicians

- Pete Gleadall – original programming
- Nick Ingman – orchestral arrangement, conducting
- Trevor Horn – additional vocals, bass guitar
- Pete Murray – additional keyboards
- Jamie Muhoberac – additional keyboards, bass
- Patrick Lannigan – bass
- Phil Palmer – electric guitar, acoustic guitar
- Lalo Creme – acoustic guitar
- Earl Harvin – vibraphone, marimba, electronic drums, acoustic drums
- Skaila Kanga – harp
- Lucinda Barry – harp

Technical personnel

- Trevor Horn – production
- Tim Weidner – recording engineer
- Robert Orton – mix engineer

Artwork

- Farrow/PSB – design, art direction
- John Ross – photography

== Charts ==
Chart performance for "Minimal"
Chart (2006)	Peak position
Denmark (Tracklisten)	7
Germany (GfK)	63
Scottish Singles Sales (Official Charts)	13
Slovakia Airplay (ČNS IFPI)	66
UK Singles (Official Charts)	19
US Dance Club Songs (Billboard)	3
