= Pet Shop Boys =

English synth-pop duo

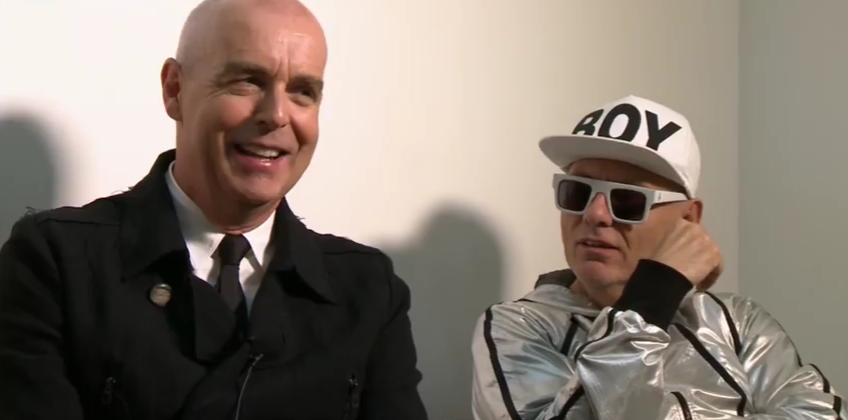
- Neil Tennant (left) and Chris Lowe (right) during an interview in 2013

Background information
- Origin: London, England
- Genres: Synth-pop; dance-pop; disco; house; hi-NRG; art pop
- Works: Discography; songs
- Years active: 1981–present
- Labels: Parlophone/Rhino; EMI; Capitol/Astralwerks; x2/Sony Records Int'l; Kobalt; Atlantic
- Members: Chris Lowe; Neil Tennant
- Website: petshopboys.co.uk

Pet Shop Boys are an English synth-pop duo formed in London in 1981. Consisting of keyboardist Chris Lowe and vocalist Neil Tennant, they have sold more than 100 million records worldwide and were listed as the most successful duo in British music history in the 1999 edition of The Guinness Book of Records. Furthermore, they are one of the best-selling bands of all time in the UK.

Pet Shop Boys have achieved 42 top 30 singles, including 22 top-10 hits on the UK singles chart, including four UK number-ones: "West End Girls" (also number one on the US Billboard Hot 100), "It's a Sin", a synth-pop version of "Always on My Mind", and "Heart". Other hit songs include a cover of "Go West", and their own "Opportunities (Let's Make Lots of Money)", and "What Have I Done to Deserve This?" in a duet with Dusty Springfield. With five US top 10 singles in the 1980s, they are associated with the Second British Invasion.

The duo is recognized as a significant act within electronic music. Their sound spans multiple genres, with synth-pop and dance-pop at its core. In their early days, they were influenced by Hi-NRG and the emerging New York hip-hop scene. They experimented with house music starting with the album Introspective (1988) and explored eurodance and techno on releases such as Very (1993) and Bilingual (1996)—the latter of which also ventured into Latin pop and Latin house. For Nightlife (1999), they collaborated with trance producers like Rollo from Faithless. In their trilogy of albums from the 2010s, they fully embraced EDM, working alongside Stuart Price. Additionally, the duo has often chosen to blend orchestral and acoustic elements with synthesizers across their works, most notably on Release (2002) and on certain tracks from Behaviour (1990).

Pet Shop Boys have been nominated for four Grammy Awards in the Dance/Electronic categories, and they have won three Brit Awards. They were presented with the award for Outstanding Contribution to Music at the 2009 Brit Awards. In 2016, Billboard named Pet Shop Boys the number one dance duo or group since the inception of the Hot Dance Club Play chart, where the duo achieved 11 number-one hits and 31 top-10 entries. In 2017, the duo received NME's Godlike Genius Award, and in 2024, they were awarded the Pop Pioneers award at the MTV Europe Music Awards.

== History ==
=== Early years and influences (1981–1984) ===
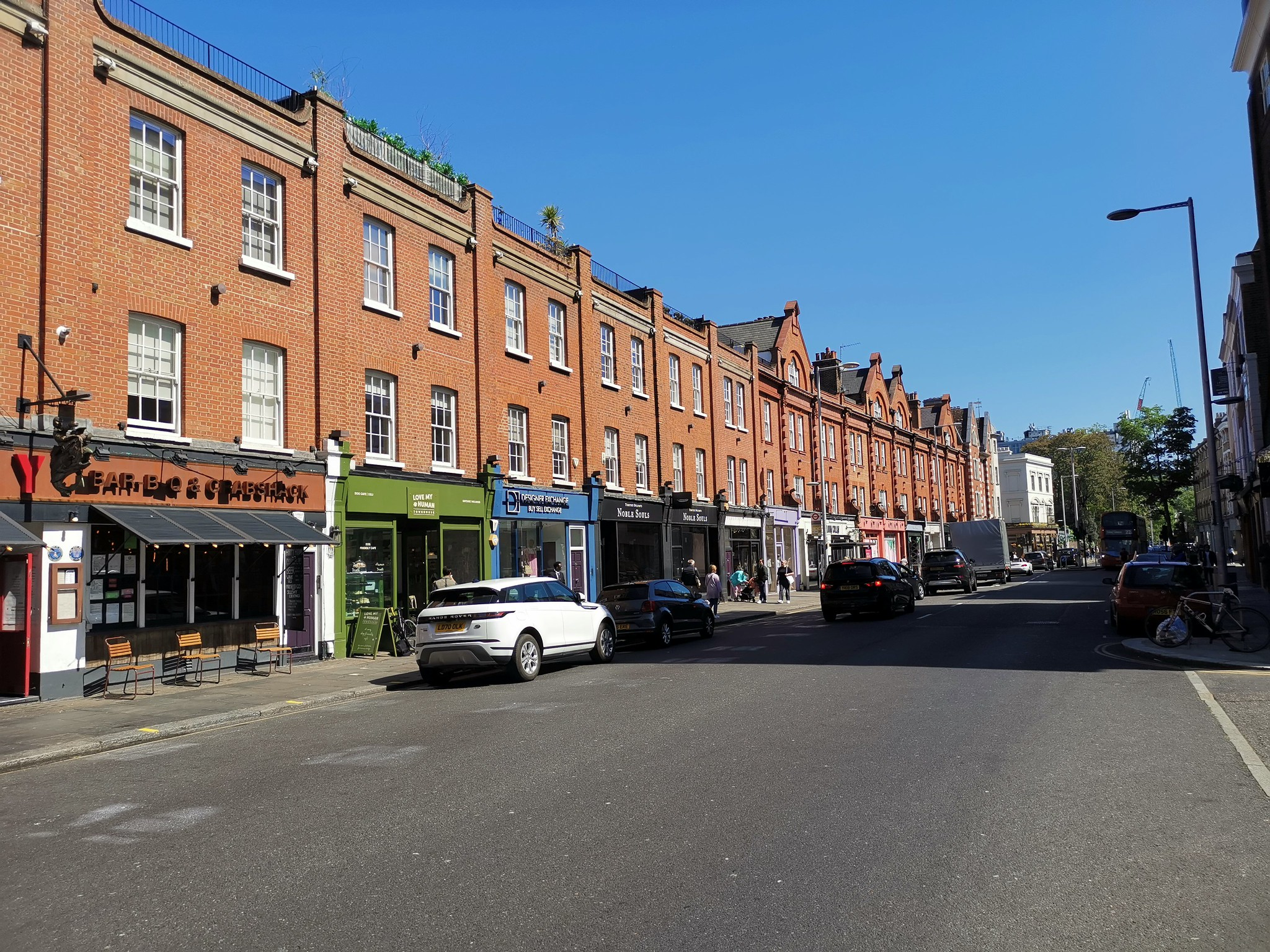
King's Road in Chelsea, London, where the hi-fi shop Tennant and Lowe met in was located

Neil Tennant and Chris Lowe met in a hi-fi shop, Chelsea Record Centre, at 203 King's Road, in Chelsea, London, on 19 August 1981. Tennant needed a connector for a Korg MS-10 synthesiser he had purchased, which sparked a conversation with Lowe. Discovering their mutual interest in disco and electronic music, they maintained contact. Both musicians were inspired by the bands Soft Cell and Orchestral Manoeuvres in the Dark (OMD); Tennant named Soft Cell's "Bedsitter" ("this song described our lives at the time") and OMD's "Souvenir" ("such a beautiful and wistful song") as the two electronic pop records that he and Lowe cherished during their early friendship. The pair would ultimately adopt the "electro-pop duo" presentation employed by both of those groups.

Other electronic bands that Tennant and Lowe listened to during this period included Kraftwerk, the Human League and Depeche Mode. The duo were also impacted by music emanating from New York City, such as East Coast hip-hop and the Hi-NRG recordings of artists including Patrick Cowley and producer Bobby Orlando. Pooling these influences, the two musicians began working on original material, first in Tennant's flat in Chelsea, then, from 1982, in a small studio in Camden Town owned by Ray Roberts. "Jealousy", written in 1982, was among the first songs they recorded there.

Tennant and Lowe briefly labelled their demo tapes under the band name West End before settling on Pet Shop Boys. They took this name from friends who worked in a pet shop in Ealing, and who were known as the "pet shop boys". They also noted a naming similarity with the recently formed rap rock group Beastie Boys. In August 1983, Tennant, who was an assistant editor at Smash Hits, went to New York to interview Sting. While there, he arranged to meet Bobby Orlando and gave him a demo tape containing "It's a Sin" and "Opportunities (Let's Make Lots of Money)".

From 1983 to 1984, Orlando recorded a number of tracks with Tennant and Lowe, including "Two Divided by Zero", "West End Girls", "Opportunities (Let's Make Lots of Money)", "A Man Could Get Arrested", "That's My Impression", "Pet Shop Boys", "One More Chance", "Rent", "It's a Sin", "I Get Excited", and "To Speak Is a Sin". In April 1984, the Orlando-produced "West End Girls" was released, becoming a club hit in Los Angeles and San Francisco. On 2 November, it was voted "Screamer of the Week" by listeners of Long Island, New York, radio station WLIR. It was a minor dance hit in Belgium and France, but was only available in the United Kingdom as a 12" import.

=== Please (1985–1986) ===
In March 1985, after long negotiations, Pet Shop Boys cut their contractual ties with Orlando, with a settlement giving him significant royalties for future sales. Hiring manager Tom Watkins, they signed with the London-based Parlophone label. In April, Tennant left Smash Hits magazine—where he had progressed to the position of deputy editor—and in July, a new single, "Opportunities (Let's Make Lots of Money)", was released, reaching number 116 in the UK. The B-side to this single, "In the Night", later resurfaced, in a longer remixed version, as the opening track to the duo's first remix album, Disco, in 1986. This version was also used as the theme for the UK television series The Clothes Show.

They returned to the studio in August to re-record "West End Girls" with producer Stephen Hague. Released in October 1985, it rose slowly in the British charts to become number one in January 1986. It subsequently replicated this success in the United States, Canada, Finland, Hong Kong, Ireland, Israel, New Zealand and Norway and sold an estimated 1.5 million copies worldwide.

After the success of "West End Girls", Pet Shop Boys released a follow-up single, "Love Comes Quickly", on 24 February 1986. The single reached number nineteen on the UK Singles Chart and was followed by their debut album, Please, on 24 March. In June 1986, the band announced a tour of Europe and America; however, their plans for a theatrical extravaganza proved to be too expensive and the tour was cancelled. Please started Pet Shop Boys' tradition of choosing one-word album titles, which Neil Tennant has since stated is now a Pet Shop Boys "signature thing", akin to E. E. Cummings' use of exclusively lower case letters. New versions of their second single, "Opportunities (Let's Make Lots of Money)", and the album track "Suburbia" were also released in 1986, followed by Disco. In September 1986, Pet Shop Boys performed "Love Comes Quickly" and "West End Girls" at the 1986 MTV Video Music Awards in Los Angeles.

=== Actually (1987–1988) ===
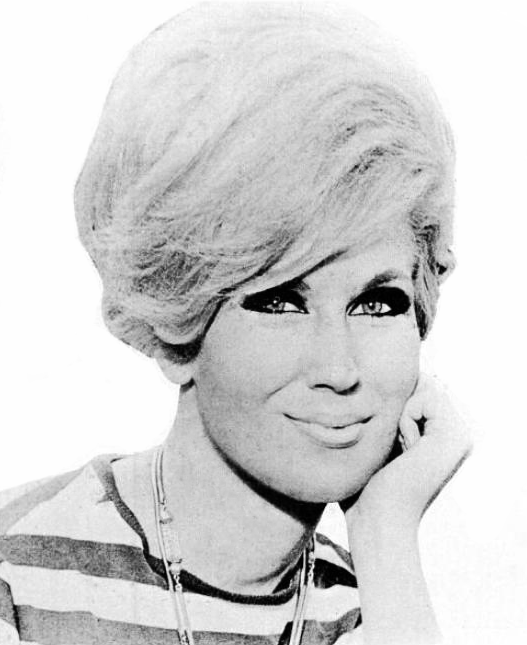
Pet Shop Boys duetted with Dusty Springfield (pictured in 1967) on "What Have I Done to Deserve This?"

In 1987, Pet Shop Boys received both a BRIT Award and Ivor Novello Award for "West End Girls". On 15 June, they released what became their second number one single, "It's a Sin". The single caused some controversy: Tennant's school, St. Cuthbert's Grammar School in Newcastle upon Tyne, chastised him in the Evening Chronicle, while pop impresario Jonathan King accused them of plagiarising the Cat Stevens song "Wild World". King recorded a version of "Wild World" in the style of Pet Shop Boys to prove his point. The group later sued King and won damages, which were donated to Jefferiss Research Trust, supporting the study of sexually transmitted diseases. The music video for "It's a Sin" was their first collaboration with director Derek Jarman.

The success of "It's a Sin" was followed up with the release of "What Have I Done to Deserve This?" on 10 August. Co-written with Allee Willis and also featuring Dusty Springfield on vocals, the single reached number two on the UK Singles Chart and the U.S. Billboard Hot 100 chart. Although the duo had wanted to release this track on their debut album, Springfield had not agreed, and they were reluctant to record it with any other female singer, despite their record company's suggestions. Springfield's manager finally contacted them in 1986, following the release of Please, and towards the end of that year, she travelled to London to record "What Have I Done to Deserve This?" with them. It was the first track to be recorded for the duo's second album, Actually. Pet Shop Boys had been told that Springfield was difficult to work with and even that she could no longer sing; however, her performance on the track put any such concerns to rest and they began a collaboration with her, which lasted until the end of the decade. The song resurrected Springfield's career, leading to her 1990 album, Reputation, on which Pet Shop Boys were major contributing writers and producers. This duet was also the start of a series of collaborations with high-profile musicians, going on throughout the band's career.

Actually was released in September 1987, followed by the single "Rent" in October, which reached number eight in the UK. The last track on the album, "King's Cross", accidentally anticipated the King's Cross fire at the London Underground section of the station in November of that year (part of the lyrics read: "Dead and wounded on either side/You know it's only a matter of time"). The Sun newspaper in the UK subsequently tried to get the track released as a charity single, but Pet Shop Boys did not agree.

At the end of the year, "Always on My Mind" became both the duo's third number one single in the UK and the Christmas number one single for 1987, beating "Fairytale of New York" by The Pogues and Kirsty MacColl. Pet Shop Boys had selected the song for an appearance on Love Me Tender, an ITV programme commemorating the tenth anniversary of Elvis Presley's death, and decided to release it. The song was not included on Actually, prompting EMI to repackage the album in the U.S. with a 12" version of the single; an extended version, "Always on My Mind/In My House", was later included on Introspective (1988). In November 2004, The Daily Telegraph newspaper placed Pet Shop Boys' version of "Always on My Mind" at number two in a list of the fifty greatest cover versions of all time.

To capitalise on their string of hits, and in lieu of a tour, Pet Shop Boys made a film that incorporated songs from Please and Actually. Working with director Jack Bond, the project grew into a full-scale movie, It Couldn't Happen Here, starring Barbara Windsor, Joss Ackland and Gareth Hunt. Footage from the film was used in the music video for "Always on My Mind". The film was released in 1988 to mixed reviews.

Heart, released in March 1988 as the last single from Actually, was Pet Shop Boys' fourth UK number one hit and their last to date. The video for the single, directed by Jack Bond, starred Ian McKellen as a vampire.

Pet Shop Boys wrote and produced the song "I'm Not Scared" for Patsy Kensit's band, Eighth Wonder. The song, released in February 1988, became her biggest hit single. Pet Shop Boys recorded their own version of the track for their album Introspective later that year. The Pet Shop Boys' version of "I'm Not Scared" was included as the opening track on the album.

=== Introspective and Behaviour (1988–1992) ===
Neil Tennant has said that the Pet Shop Boys' "Imperial Phase" ended in September 1988, when their new single, "Domino Dancing", entered the UK Singles Chart at number nine and only reached number seven. Tennant recalls being disappointed upon hearing the news, and he felt that their peak period was over and that it was going to be a challenge to maintain their level of success in the future.

Their third album, Introspective, was released on 10 October 1988. Unusually, this was a six-track album of previously unheard remixes and new tracks in extended form. It was followed by the Trevor Horn–produced top-five single "Left to My Own Devices", and a cover version of the Sterling Void song "It's Alright". Pet Shop Boys embarked on their first tour in 1989, performing in Hong Kong, Japan, and Britain. The tour followed the ideas of the extravaganza that could not have been afforded earlier in their careers. Derek Jarman returned to direct the performance and he provided several films that were projected during the shows.

The September 1990 single, "So Hard" reached number four in the UK and was followed by their fourth studio album, Behaviour, which was recorded in Munich with producer Harold Faltermeyer. The album was not intended to reflect a dramatic change in mood from their earlier albums; however, it is noticeably subdued. It included the fan favourite "Being Boring", the second single from the album, which only reached number 20 on the UK Singles Chart, their lowest placing at the time. The title is from a quote by Zelda Fitzgerald: "... she refused to be bored chiefly because she wasn't boring", and the song was a personal commentary on the AIDS epidemic. The music video was directed by filmmaker Bruce Weber. By this time, the duo had parted ways with manager Tom Watkins, replacing him with Jill Carrington, who had previously been marketing director at Polydor.

In March 1991, a cover of U2's "Where the Streets Have No Name" as a medley with "Can't Take My Eyes Off You", the 1960s pop song by Frankie Valli/the Four Seasons, was released as a double-A-sided single with a remix of the album track "How Can You Expect to Be Taken Seriously?" by Brothers in Rhythm. This was followed by the duo's first world tour. The Performance Tour kicked off in Tokyo on 11 March 1991 and visited the United States, Canada, France, Belgium, Germany, Denmark, Sweden, Finland, Czechoslovakia, Austria, Hungary, Yugoslavia, Switzerland, Italy, Spain, the Netherlands, Ireland and the United Kingdom. The shows were designed by David Alden and David Fielding, who had designed several sets for the Royal Opera House.

Before taking a break in 1992, Pet Shop Boys released an 18-track compilation called Discography (1991), which included all of their single releases up until then and two new singles—"DJ Culture" and "Was It Worth It?"—omitting only "How Can You Expect to Be Taken Seriously?" (although it did appear on the video companion Videography). While "DJ Culture" had some success, "Was It Worth It?" became the duo's first single to miss the UK top 20 since their two Bobby O debut singles.

During this period, Pet Shop Boys continued to collaborate with many high-profile musicians. They worked again with Dusty Springfield, on the singles "Nothing Has Been Proved", recorded for the film Scandal about the Profumo political scandal, and "In Private". The duo later went on to produce half of the tracks on her 1990 solo Reputation album. Pet Shop Boys were also asked to write and produce an album for Liza Minnelli, in 1989. The album, Results, generated four singles, including the hit "Losing My Mind", a cover version of the Stephen Sondheim song from the 1971 Broadway musical "Follies". The duo's own demo of this appeared on their "Jealousy" single as a B-side. These collaborations also extended Pet Shop Boy's songwriting and production work to recordings by other artists.

Tennant worked with Bernard Sumner and Johnny Marr on their first album as Electronic, whose first single, "Getting Away with It", co-written and co-produced by Tennant, was released on 4 December 1989. In 1991, Lowe also contributed to the Electronic project, contributing the chord sequence to "The Patience of a Saint" on their 1991 album. In 1992, Tennant sang lead vocals on the non-album single "Disappointed", which was featured on the soundtrack to the film Cool World. Pet Shop Boys set up the Spaghetti Records label in 1991. Their most successful release was the soundtrack to the 1992 film The Crying Game, which featured Boy George performing a cover of Dave Berry's 1964 song "The Crying Game". The song was produced by Pet Shop Boys and featured Tennant on backing vocals. Other artists on the label included Scottish singer Cicero, the Ignorants, and Masterboy.

In 1992, they were the subjects of a South Bank Show documentary on ITV with contributions from Liza Minnelli and music critic Dorian Lynskey.

=== Very and Disco 2 (1993–1995) ===
In June 1993, Pet Shop Boys re-invented their image and made a strong return to the UK Singles Chart with "Can You Forgive Her?". Taking its title from the Anthony Trollope novel of the same name, the single reached number seven on the UK Singles Chart, while its iconic music video featured the duo in orange body suits and tall dunce caps, in a world of computer-generated imagery. The theme was continued with the follow-up single, a cover of the Village People song "Go West", which reached number two in the UK, with another computer-generated music video, this time inspired by the Soviet Union, with shots of the duo filmed in Moscow. The tune was adopted as a football chant at Arsenal Football Club, which Chris Lowe supports, and it became a widespread and iconic stadium anthem.

The duo's fifth studio album, Very, followed on 27 September and is the only Pet Shop Boys album to reach number one on the UK Albums Chart. It was produced by Pet Shop Boys and mixed with additional production by Stephen Hague, who had worked with them on their first album and had subsequently made records with OMD, New Order and Erasure. The other singles from Very, "I Wouldn't Normally Do This Kind of Thing", "Liberation" and "Yesterday, When I Was Mad", continued the theme of CGI videos, peaking with the "Liberation" video, which contained almost no real-life elements at all. All these videos were directed by Howard Greenhalgh, who continued to work with Pet Shop Boys well into the next decade. Very was also released in a limited edition including an entirely new album, Relentless, which was composed of six all-new progressive house tracks.

In 1994, Pet Shop Boys offered to remix fellow Parlophone act Blur's single "Girls & Boys". It was a club hit throughout Europe and started a sporadic trend for Pet Shop Boys to remix other artists' music. Also in 1994, Pet Shop Boys released the Comic Relief single, "Absolutely Fabulous". The idea started when Tennant and Lowe were playing around with samples from the BBC sitcom Absolutely Fabulous in the studio. They approached lead actors Jennifer Saunders and Joanna Lumley and suggested it as a charity single. It was released under the artist name 'Absolutely Fabulous'; Tennant and Lowe do not consider it as a Pet Shop Boys single release and it was not included on their next best-of album. The video featured clips from the sitcom, along with newly recorded footage of Tennant and Lowe with the characters of Edina (Saunders) and Patsy (Lumley).

On 12 September 1994, Pet Shop Boys released the follow-up to their 1986 remix album Disco, in the form of Disco 2. The album featured club remixes of the singles released from Very and Behaviour, in a continuous megamix by Danny Rampling. Then, in October, Pet Shop Boys began their Discovery tour, visiting areas that they had never performed in before: Singapore, Australia, Puerto Rico, Mexico, Colombia, Chile, Argentina and Brazil. The following year, a new version of "Paninaro", the 1986 B-side to "Suburbia", was released to promote the B-sides collection Alternative. The single, called "Paninaro '95", is based on the live version from the Discovery tour.

=== Bilingual and Nightlife (1996–2001) ===
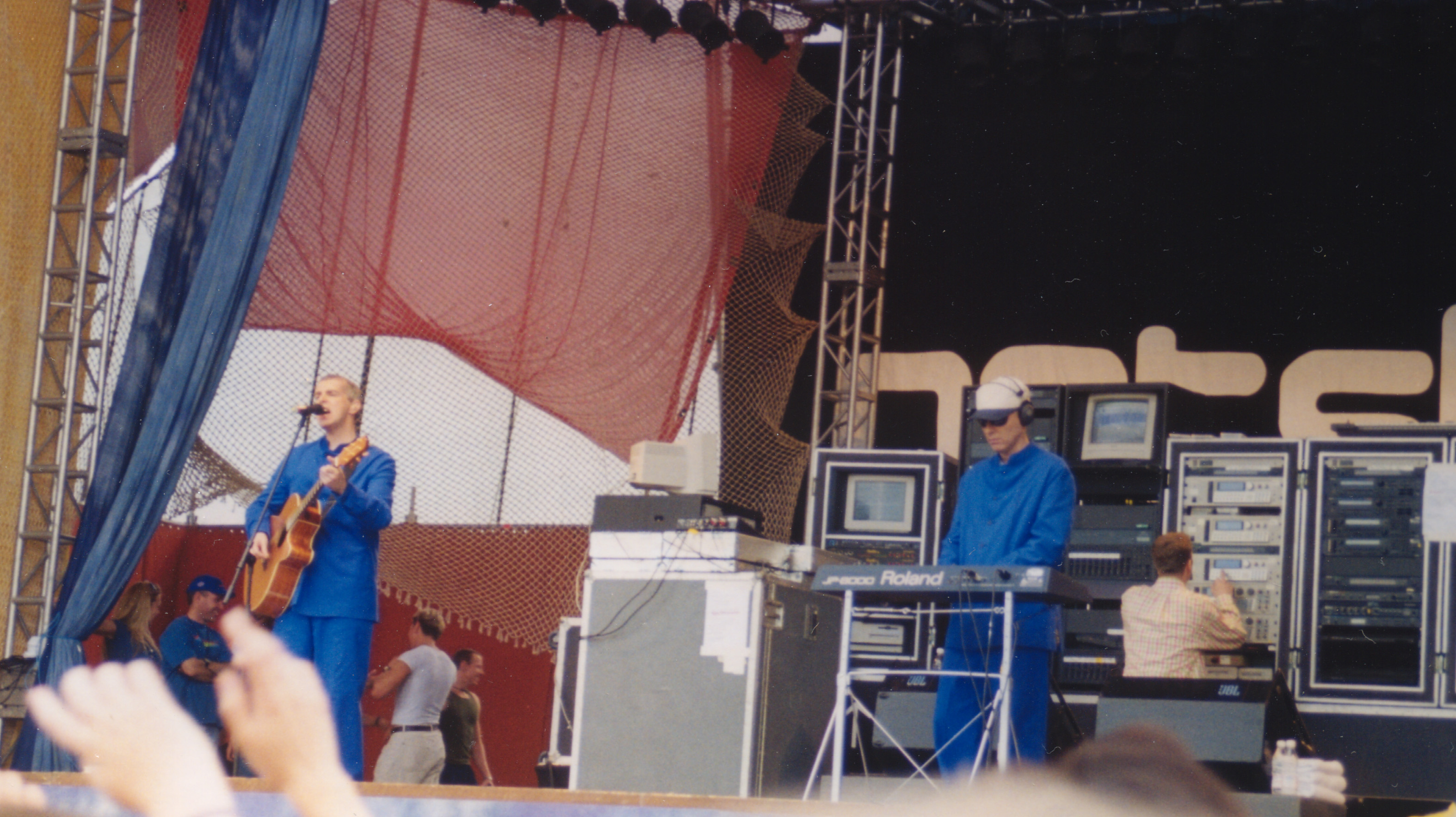
Pet Shop Boys performing in Turku, Finland, in 1997

The Pet Shop Boys remix of the David Bowie song "Hallo Spaceboy" featured Tennant on backing vocals and was released in the UK on 19 February 1996. Pet Shop Boys then joined Bowie during his performance of the song at the 1996 Brit Awards ceremony, as well as an appearance on the Top of the Pops television programme. The idea emerged after Neil Tenant talked to Bowie backstage during Bowie's concert in November 1995 and Bowie contacted Tennant about doing the remix a few weeks later. Tina Turner released her Wildest Dreams album in April, featuring the song "Confidential", written and co-produced by Pet Shop Boys.

The Pet Shop Boys single "Before" reached number seven on the UK Singles Chart in April. In August, they released a follow-up single, "Se a vida é (That's the Way Life Is)", a Latin American music-inspired track, featuring a drum sample from a track called "Estrada da paixão" by Brazilian act Olodum. This preceded the sixth Pet Shop Boys album Bilingual, which was released in September.

Pet Shop Boys were the first band to have a residency at a West End theatre, playing for two weeks at the Savoy Theatre in June 1997. Lowe selected the song "Somewhere" from West Side Story to be the centrepiece of the performance and a new single. The production featured an interactive film by Sam Taylor-Wood showing a party scene, which Tennant and Lowe appeared to leave and enter from the stage. The show lost money, and the duo offset their losses in part by playing music festivals including the Roskilde Festival in 1997 and Creamfields in 1999.

The majority of 1998 was spent with a series of live dates and minor releases, including a charity album of Noël Coward songs, called Twentieth Century Blues. The album included Pet Shop Boys' version of "Sail Away", along with songs performed by Elton John, Texas, Marianne Faithfull, The Divine Comedy, Suede, Damon Albarn, Vic Reeves and Robbie Williams. Tennant also co-produced the Williams track and provided backing vocals for Elton John. Tennant provided backing vocals on Robbie Williams' "No Regrets" single, along with Neil Hannon from The Divine Comedy. Meanwhile, the band switched managers again as Carrington resigned and was succeeded by Mitch Clark, who had previously worked for EMI International as Head of Promotion.

During this time, Pet Shop Boys began to work with playwright Jonathan Harvey on a stage musical project. In 1999, some of the tracks they recorded ended up on their seventh studio album, Nightlife, including "Closer to Heaven", which would later become the title song of their musical. Nightlife produced the top 10 hit "You Only Tell Me You Love Me When You're Drunk" and the top 20 singles "I Don't Know What You Want But I Can't Give It Any More" and "New York City Boy". The album also featured a duet with Kylie Minogue, "In Denial", about a father coming out to his daughter. Minogue later performed the track live, during her 2005 Showgirl tour, singing to a pre-recorded Neil Tennant. This was not the first time that Pet Shop Boys worked with Minogue: In 1994, they wrote a song for her eponymous Kylie Minogue album, called "Falling", which was based on an unreleased remix of "Go West" with new lyrics by Tennant; however, Minogue and her record company did not like the style of Pet Shop Boys' demo and asked Farley & Heller to produce the track.

Pet Shop Boys incurred financial losses on the Nightlife Tour in 1999–2000 after promoter Harvey Goldsmith's company went into receivership. During a concert in a partially empty arena in Sheffield, they briefly considered disbanding; the duo later recalled this period as a low point in their career.

On 24 June 2000, Pet Shop Boys made their debut at the Glastonbury Festival on the Pyramid Stage as the sun was setting, before Travis headlined. Cerys Matthews of Catatonia took the part of Dusty Springfield for the duet on "What Have I Done to Deserve This?" Their performance before an enthusiastic crowd was considered a triumph. The following week at Roskilde, Pet Shop Boys and Oasis refused to perform when the organisers decided to continue with the festival despite the deaths of nine people in a crowd crush during Pearl Jam's set.

The musical Closer to Heaven premiered in London in May 2001 to mixed reviews. The run was originally extended to February 2002, but it closed in October 2001 along with a number of other productions after the 11 September 2001 attacks.

=== Release (2002–2005) ===
While Closer to Heaven was still in development, Pet Shop Boys had started work on their eighth studio album in September 2000. After toying with genres including hip-hop, they went for a stripped back, guitar-driven sound as a departure from dance music, at Lowe's suggestion. In 2002, they released the modestly successful album Release. Most of the tracks were produced by the duo themselves and many featured Johnny Marr on guitar. The first single, "Home and Dry", featured a very peculiar music video, directed by Wolfgang Tillmans, mostly consisting of raw camcorder footage of mice filmed in the London Underground. The follow-up single "I Get Along" had a video filmed by Bruce Weber.

Pet Shop Boys embarked on another world tour, although this time it was a stripped back affair, with no dancers, backing singers, costumes or lavish sets. They used two extra guitarists, Bic Hayes and Mark Refoy, percussionist Dawne Adams, and regular programmer Pete Gleadall, alongside Lowe on keyboards and Tennant on guitar and vocals. They started with a tour of universities around the UK, performing at Bristol University, Keele University, University of East Anglia in Norwich, University of Teesside, Middlesbrough and De Montfort University, Leicester. Subsequent dates took them to Germany, the U.S., Canada, Spain, Italy, France, Belgium, the Netherlands, Denmark, Sweden, then another series of dates in the UK, and on to Switzerland, Japan, Singapore, Hong Kong, and then a first-ever date in Thailand as the final show, at the large Bangkok Impact Arena.

A third single, "London", was released in Germany at the request of EMI Germany. It was never planned for release in the UK, although a promotional video was shot by the distinguished photographer Martin Parr and it was serviced to some UK radio stations. Following a live stint on the John Peel show on Radio 1, Pet Shop Boys released Disco 3, in February 2003. The album followed their previous Disco albums, but this one also included new songs as well as remixes.

In 2003, Pet Shop Boys launched two new labels, Olde English Vinyl and Lucky Kunst, their Spaghetti Records label becoming defunct. The first release on Olde English Vinyl was Atomizer's "Hooked on Radiation", followed by Pete Burns' "Jack and Jill Party" in 2004. The only Lucky Kunst release to date is the Kiki Kokova's version of "Love to Love You Baby". They also remixed Yoko Ono's "Walking on Thin Ice" in 2003 and Rammstein's "Mein Teil" in 2004. Another new manager, David Dorrell, was brought on board to replace Clark. In November 2003, Pet Shop Boys released a second greatest hits album, PopArt: The Hits, a double compilation with two new singles: "Miracles" and "Flamboyant". Not chronologically arranged, the tracks were divided into two discs: Pop including the more traditional pop songs and Art containing those works which were considered more experimental.

In September 2004, Pet Shop Boys appeared at a free concert in Trafalgar Square in London, where they performed, with the Dresdner Sinfoniker orchestra, a whole new soundtrack to accompany the seminal 1925 silent film Battleship Potemkin. There were four further live performances of the work with the Dresdner Sinfoniker in Germany in September 2005. The Battleship Potemkin soundtrack was then released on 5 September 2005. In November 2004, Pet Shop Boys played at the Prince's Trust concert titled "Produced by Trevor Horn" with other artists who had worked with Trevor Horn, including Grace Jones, ABC, Seal and Frankie Goes to Hollywood. In 2005, Pet Shop Boys were selected as the headline act for the Moscow Live 8 concert, in Red Square, where a crowd of between 60,000 and 80,000 gathered to watch them perform. Also in 2005, Pet Shop Boys were asked to put together Back to Mine: Pet Shop Boys, the twentieth release in an ongoing series showcasing artists' favourite music selections, with an emphasis on afterhours chill-out music. As a condition, Neil Tennant and Chris Lowe were given one disc each, whereas all previous releases in the series consisted of only a single disc per group.

=== Fundamental (2006–2008) ===
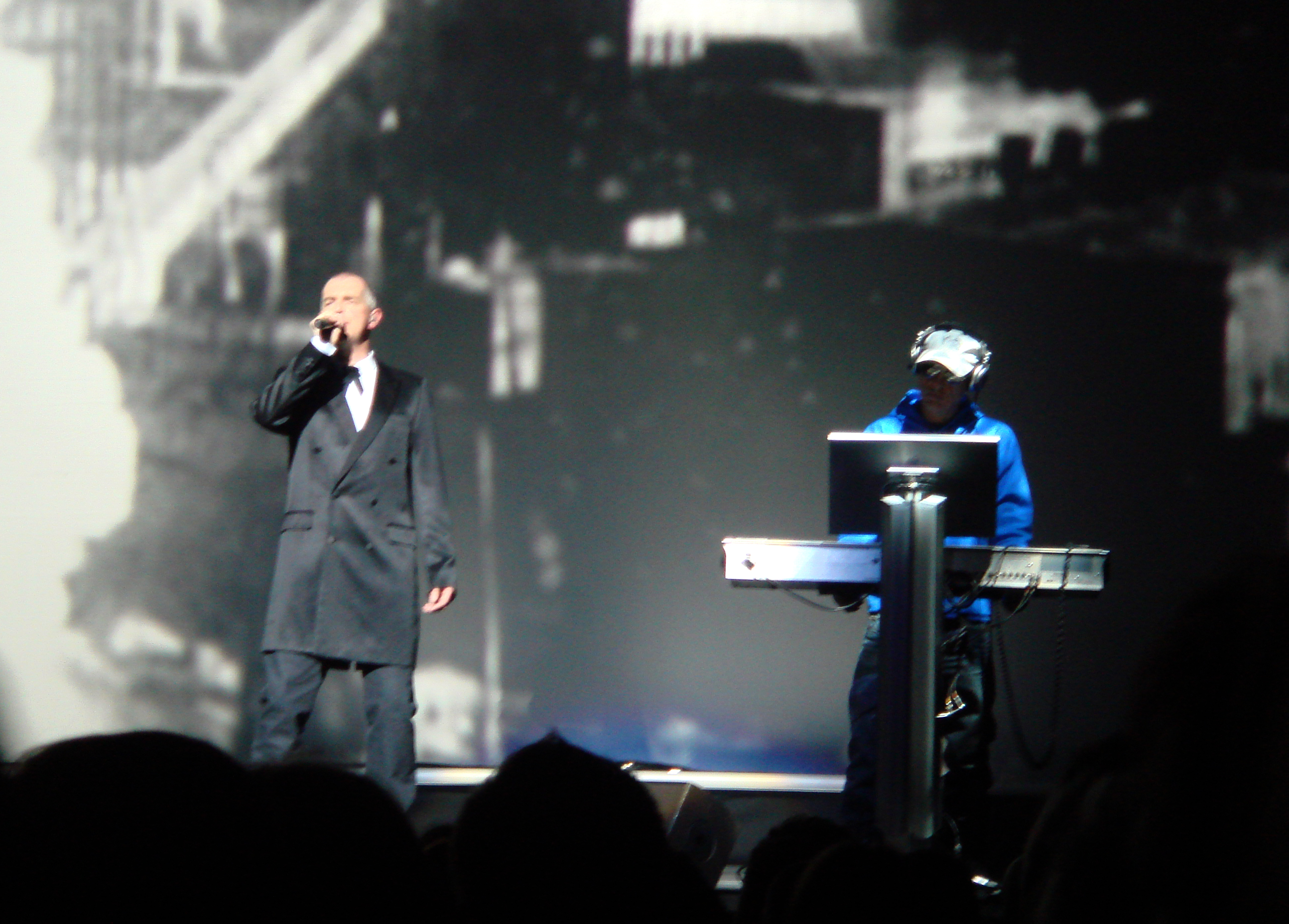
Pet Shop Boys performing in 2007

Pet Shop Boys began 2006 remixing Madonna's single "Sorry", for release in February. The single reached number one in the UK and the Pet Shop Boys remix included new backing vocals performed by Tennant. Madonna subsequently used the Pet Shop Boys remix, including Tennant's vocals, on her 2006 Confessions Tour.

In April, Pet Shop Boys released a new single that reached number eight in the UK, "I'm with Stupid", a commentary on the relationship between George W. Bush and Tony Blair. The promo video featured Matt Lucas and David Walliams, better known as the team behind Little Britain. Lucas and Walliams portray Lowe and Tennant, parodying two of the duo's previous videos, "Go West", and "Can You Forgive Her?". The ninth Pet Shop Boys studio album, Fundamental, followed in May, reaching number five in the UK. The album was produced by Trevor Horn, who Pet Shop Boys had previously worked with on "Left to My Own Devices", in 1988. The album was also released with a limited edition remix album called Fundamentalism, which included a version of "In Private" as a duet with Elton John and "Fugitive", a new track produced by Richard X.

The week that Fundamental was released, a documentary, titled Pet Shop Boys: A Life in Pop, was broadcast on Channel 4, directed by George Scott and produced by Nick de Grunwald. The original broadcast was less than an hour in duration; a 140-minute version was released on DVD in October 2006. Contributors to the programme included Robbie Williams, Brandon Flowers, Tim Rice-Oxley, Jake Shears and Bruce Weber. The DVD also contained promo videos that had been made since the release of PopArt.

The second single to be taken from the album was the UK top twenty "Minimal". The duo filmed the video to the single in Paris with Don Cameron. The single was the first of theirs to be playlisted by London's biggest radio station, Capital Radio, in a decade. Pet Shop Boys began a worldwide tour in support of Fundamental in June 2006 in Norway. The show was designed and directed by Es Devlin, a British theatre designer, and choreographed by Hakeem Onibudo. Between 15 June and 10 September 2006, Pet Shop Boys played a series of concert dates across Europe, mainly at assorted festivals and outdoor venues. These included two dates at the Tower of London on 28 and 29 June and a single show at Thetford Forest, as well as performances of Battleship Potemkin in Germany and Spain. On 1 May 2006, Battleship Potemkin was also performed at the Swan Hunter shipyard, in Newcastle upon Tyne, with Pet Shop Boys accompanied by the Northern Sinfonia orchestra.

On 3 October 2006, the long-delayed U.S. release of their PopArt hits package was issued by Capitol Records. During 2006, Pet Shop Boys worked with Robbie Williams on his album Rudebox, producing two tracks: a cover version of "We're the Pet Shop Boys", written by My Robot Friend (which Pet Shop Boys had also recorded themselves and released as a B-side to "Miracles" in 2003), and "She's Madonna", a duet with Tennant. On 10 October 2006, Pet Shop Boys embarked on the North and Central American leg of their world tour, which took them through Canada, the United States and Mexico, concluding on 16 November. A DVD of the show in Mexico City was released on 21 May 2007, titled Cubism. It was recorded on 14 November 2006, in the Auditorio Nacional, and was directed by David Barnard.

On 16 October, Catalogue was published by Thames & Hudson, a 336-page hardcover book written by Philip Hoare and Chris Heath, detailing their entire visual output, including photography as well as the design of albums, music videos, concert tours, books and fan club magazines from 1984 to 2004. Neil Tennant comments in the book: "In the beginning we made a decision – and it was in our EMI contract – that that we would have control over how everything worked; that obviously the songs mattered hugely, but the way they were presented was going to matter hugely as well; and that we were never going to give up on that." Pet Shop Boys supported the publication of the book with signings in London, New York City, Los Angeles and Berlin. To coincide with the publication of Catalogue, a small exhibition of portraits of Pet Shop Boys opened in the Bookshop Gallery of London's National Portrait Gallery on 30 October 2006 and ran to 4 March 2007.

Also on 16 October, the third single from Fundamental, "Numb", written by Diane Warren, was released, following its appearance at the end of the BBC's coverage of England at the World Cup. "Numb" became only the second Pet Shop Boys single to that point to miss the Top 20.

On 23 October 2006, Concrete was released. It is a double CD of the complete Mermaid Theatre concert, with the BBC Concert Orchestra, featuring guests Rufus Wainwright, Frances Barber, and Robbie Williams, and Trevor Horn as the musical director. A 90-minute "director's cut" of the concert aired on BBC 6 Music, on 28 August 2006. On 7 December 2006, Pet Shop Boys were nominated for two 2007 Grammy Awards: Best Dance Recording for "I'm with Stupid", and Best Electronic/Dance Album for Fundamental. During the latter part of 2006 and early 2007, Neil Tennant served as executive producer on Rufus Wainwright's album, Release the Stars, recorded in Berlin. He sang backing vocals on a number of tracks, including "Do I Disappoint You", and "Tiergarten".

Pet Shop Boys continued their world tour, albeit with a slightly different production and set list, on 14 March 2007, in Rio de Janeiro, Brazil, then played concerts in Argentina, Chile, New Zealand and Australia (as co-headliners of the V Festival 2007), Norway, Estonia, Latvia, Lithuania, Germany, Switzerland, France, the Netherlands, Great Britain, Denmark, Ireland, Sweden, Italy, Spain, Belgium and Singapore. Pet Shop Boys "played" at the free festival Secondfest, in the online virtual world Second Life, on 30 June. The Fundamental tour ended in Bucharest, Romania, in November 2007.

On 8 October 2007, Pet Shop Boys released Disco 4, the latest in their series of remix albums; the fourth in the set differed in that it was largely made up of remixes, completed by Pet Shop Boys, of other artists' work over the past decade. These include The Killers, David Bowie, Yoko Ono, Madonna, Atomizer and Rammstein. Only two tracks by Pet Shop Boys, remixed versions of Fundamental tracks "Integral" and "I'm with Stupid", were included.

In October 2008, Pet Shop Boys released the single "I'm in Love with a German Film Star" featuring British photographer Sam Taylor-Wood on vocals. This single was made for her exhibition in London and it was released by Kompakt records in Germany, on both CD and 7" and 12" vinyl. The most notable remixes were by Gui Boratto, Jurgen Paape and Mark Reeder.

=== Yes (2009–2011) ===
Pet Shop Boys received the Brit Award for Outstanding Contribution to Music in 2009. A statement from Brits Committee chairman Ged Doherty said: "Since their first Brit Award over 20 years ago, Neil and Chris have produced a fantastic body of work with songs that truly were the soundtrack to a whole generation's lives. The Pet Shop Boys have since become one of the most influential groups of the modern era and are deserving recipients of the award." The duo performed a medley of their greatest hits at the ceremony, with Lady Gaga singing Dusty Springfield's part on "What Have I Done to Deserve This?"

Pet Shop Boys completed their next album in late 2008. Recorded with Xenomania and released in UK on 23 March 2009, Yes received generally favorable reviews and hit number four in the UK, their highest album chart position in more than a decade. Pet Shop Boys co-wrote the Girls Aloud Top 10 track "The Loving Kind". Originally written for Yes, the song was deemed unsuitable by Lowe and was given to the popular girl group to record instead for their album Out of Control. At the start of 2009, Pet Shop Boys appointed Angela Becker as their new manager.

On 4 November 2009, Pet Shop Boys celebrated the Brazilian leg of the tour by releasing a compilation titled Party, including songs that were heavily featured in popular soap operas on TV Globo: "Being boring" (Meu Bem Meu Mal OST), "Domino dancing" (O Salvador da Patria OST), "West End Girls" (Selva de Pedra OST) and "King of Rome" (Viver a Vida). On 14 December 2009, Pet Shop Boys released an EP of covers, remixes, and new material, titled Christmas. On 20 December the EP entered the UK chart at number 40.

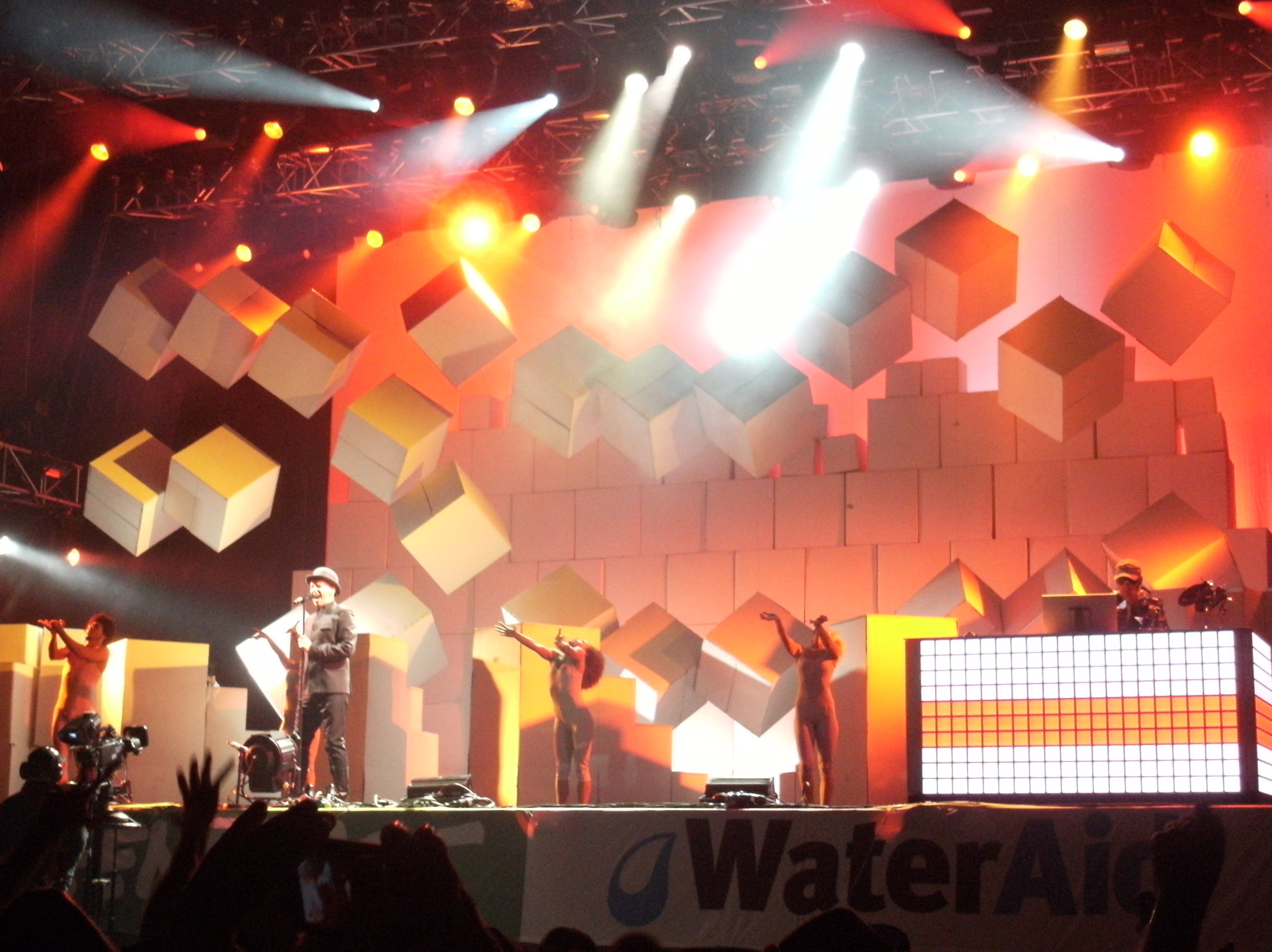
Pet Shop Boys performing in 2010

On 15 February 2010, Pet Shop Boys released a live album/DVD double-pack called Pandemonium. It contains the soundtrack and footage recorded from their 21 December 2009 show at the O2 Arena in London. Pet Shop Boys released their version of "Love Life" in April 2010 as a limited edition 7-inch vinyl single available only in independent UK record stores. The song was originally recorded during the Release sessions in 2001 and was subsequently given to Swedish band Alcazar. The B-side was "A Powerful Friend", a song originally composed in the early 1980s and subsequently recorded in late 2002 during the recording sessions that would contribute to the Disco 3 album.

In June 2010, Pet Shop Boys headlined the Other Stage on the Saturday evening of the 40th anniversary Glastonbury Festival and were heralded as dazzling with "one of the most spectacular Glastonbury moments ever". This set included a surprise cover of Coldplay's "Viva La Vida", which Tennant thought sounded similar to a Pet Shop Boys song when he first heard it.

In November they released their third compilation album Ultimate preceded by the single "Together"; a limited edition featured their entire Glastonbury festival performance from that year on an additional DVD.

Pet Shop Boys composed a ballet, The Most Incredible Thing, based on a fairy tale by Hans Christian Andersen, which opened at Sadlers Wells in London on 17 March 2011. The story was adapted by Matthew Dunster and the ballet was choreographed by Javier de Frutos. It featured former Royal Ballet star Ivan Putrov, animated films created by Tal Rosner, and orchestrations by German composer Sven Helbig, who worked with the band in 2005 as a co-producer for Battleship Potemkin. Pet Shop Boys and Javier de Frutos were awarded the Beyond Theatre Award for The Most Incredible Thing at the 2011 Evening Standard Theatre Awards.

=== Elysium and Electric (2011–2015) ===
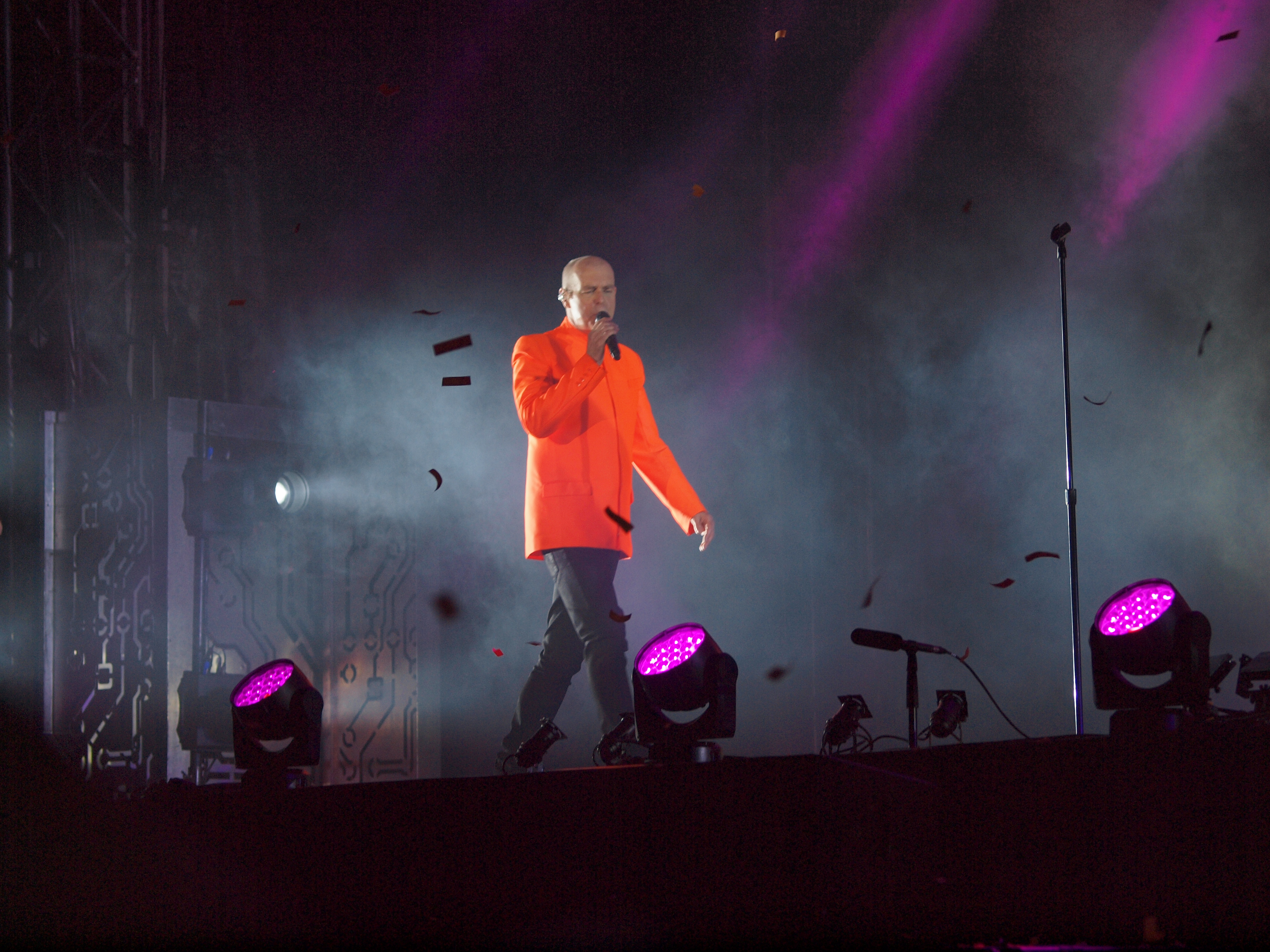
Neil Tennant performing at Pori Jazz in Finland in 2014

On 28 September 2011, Pet Shop Boys announced that they had written 16 songs in preparation for their next studio album. In the meantime, Format, an album of the duo's B-sides from 1996 to 2009, was released on 6 February 2012 as a sequel to their earlier B-side collection Alternative. Format entered the UK charts at number 26 on 12 February 2012.

In January 2012, Pet Shop Boys started recording their new album in Los Angeles with producer Andrew Dawson. In June, a teaser video by renowned Los Angeles artist/film-maker Brian Bress for the album track "Invisible" was released online, at which time Elysium was revealed to be name of the new album. The first single was "Winner", preceding the release of Elysium in September. On 28 July, Pet Shop Boys performed "Winner", "Always On My Mind" and "What Have I Done to Deserve This?" before the Olympic tennis games in Henman Hill, Wimbledon. At the 2012 Summer Olympics closing ceremony on 12 August, Tennant and Lowe rode around the stadium in cycle-driven chariots, wearing pointy hats as they performed "West End Girls" to a global audience.

In March 2013, Pet Shop Boys announced that they were leaving their longtime record label Parlophone. Their twelfth album, entitled Electric, was released on 12 July 2013 on their own label x2 through Kobalt Label Services. The album was the biggest-selling record among the UK's independent record shops during the week of its release, and went straight to the number one position on the Official Record Store Chart. Electric was the first of three consecutive albums produced by Stuart Price. The release coincided with the Electric Tour that included Chile, Argentina, Paraguay, Brazil, Colombia, Asia—with dates in the Philippines, Indonesia, and China for the first time—Lebanon, Israel, Turkey, Europe and North America. On 23 July, Pet Shop Boys appeared at the BBC Proms to premiere A Man from the Future, a piece written for orchestra, choir, electronics, and narrator, based on the life of Alan Turing.

=== Super, Further Listening, and Agenda (2016–2019) ===
On 21 January 2016, Pet Shop Boys previewed the track "Inner Sanctum" from their thirteenth album, Super. The lead single from the album, "The Pop Kids", was released on 18 March, reaching number one on the US Dance Club Songs chart. The album debuted at number three on the UK Albums Chart, selling 16,953 copies in its first week, becoming their thirteenth consecutive top 10 studio album. In the United States, Super debuted at number 58 on the Billboard 200 with first-week sales of 10,000 copies. It also debuted at number one on Billboard's Dance/Electronic Albums chart, becoming Pet Shop Boys' first number one album on the chart since Disco 3 (2003).

Pet Shop Boys announced their Further Listening reissues project, called Catalogue: 1985–2012 in June 2017. The first batch was released that July with a remaster of Nightlife, Release and Fundamental. Reissues of Yes and Elysium were released on 20 October 2017, and the previously released Further Listening albums Please, Actually, and Introspective were remastered and re-released on 2 March 2018. The fourth and final batch of reissues—Behaviour, Very and Bilingual—was released on 31 August 2018.

The live album/DVD/Blu-ray Inner Sanctum was released in April 2019. It followed February's EP Agenda. which contains four new songs with a political and pop culture angle. Neil Tennant said the release "contains three satirical songs and one rather sad song. I think it's because of the times we're living through".

=== Hotspot, Nonetheless, Dreamworld, and A Man from the Future (2020–present) ===
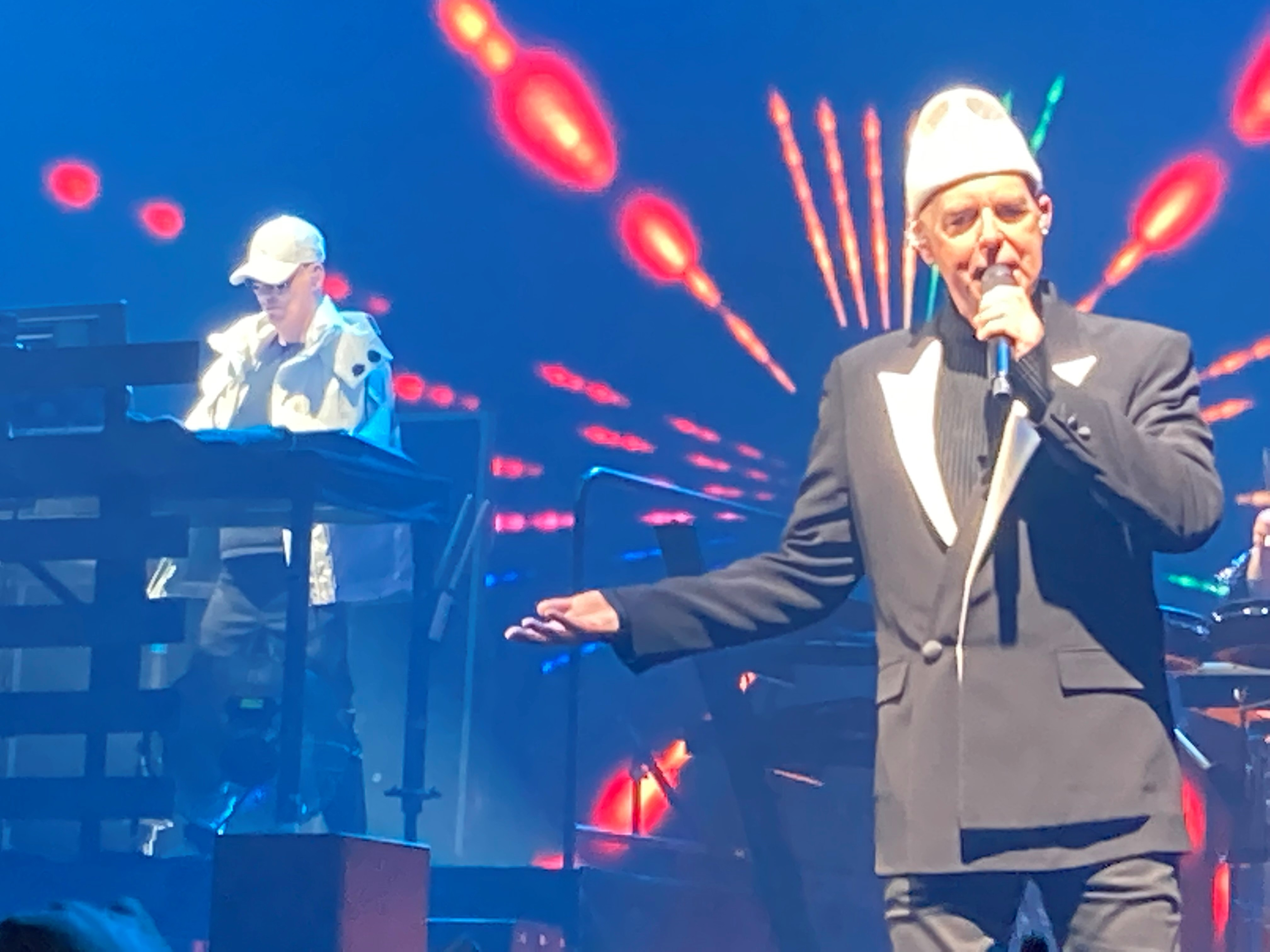
Pet Shop Boys performing in Cork, Ireland, in June 2022

In 2020, Pet Shop Boys' fourteenth album, Hotspot, was released on x2/Kobalt. Three singles were released to promote Hotspot: "Dreamland" featuring Years & Years, "Monkey Business", and "I Don't Wanna".

The corresponding Dreamworld tour was planned to start mid-2020, but was postponed twice due to the COVID-19 pandemic. It finally got underway in May 2022 and included their third appearance at the Glastonbury festival, this time closing the Other Stage on the Sunday night. In September and October 2022, the band co-headlined the Unity Tour with New Order, playing twelve arenas across Canada and the US. On 31 December 2022, Pet Shop Boys performed at Edinburgh's Hogmanay celebrations with a special Dreamworld show. In 2023 they continued their Dreamworld tour, headlining the Primavera Sound festivals in Barcelona, Madrid, Porto, Santiago, São Paulo and Lima.

In March 2023, the duo started working on their fifteenth studio album with producer James Ford. In the interim, the EP Lost, made up of music recorded during Super sessions was released.

In January 2024, the album title Nonetheless and its cover art were revealed with an 26 April release date, along with the news that Pet Shop Boys would be returning to Parlophone. The music video for the lead single, "Loneliness", was released on YouTube on 31 January. On 3 April the second single "Dancing Star" was released, inspired by Russian ballet dancer Rudolf Nureyev. The single featured a remix of a previous B-side "Party in the Blitz" featuring Princess Julia. The third single, "A New Bohemia" was released on 4 June, followed by a fourth single, "Feel" on 20 August. The fifth single, a double A-side of "New London Boy" and a cover version of "All The Young Dudes" by David Bowie, was released on 7 November, followed by an expanded re-release of Nonetheless on 22 November, including demo versions of all tracks plus four new bonus tracks.

The ongoing Dreamworld tour included a five-night residency at the Royal Opera House in July 2024, followed by a gig at Funny Girls in Blackpool and a headline appearance at the final night of Radio 2 in the Park in Preston in September. In November, Pet Shop Boys played "All the Young Dudes" in a medley with "West End Girls", accompanied by the Manchester Camerata, at the 2024 MTV Europe Music Awards, where the duo were honoured as Pop Pioneers. They also appeared on Strictly Come Dancing in Lowe's hometown during Blackpool Week, playing a medley of hits for the opening dance number, followed by a performance of "All the Young Dudes" the next night. The Dreamworld tour continued with concerts in the UK and Europe in summer 2025. In 2026, the tour visited Japan and South America. At the Viña del Mar International Song Festival in Chile, Pet Shop Boys received the Gaviota de Plata and Gaviota de Oro audience awards.

In April 2026, Pet Shop Boys played a five-night residency called Obscure at the Electric Ballroom in Camden Town, with a varying setlist of their lesser known B-sides, album tracks, and fan favourites. The set also featured the debut of a new song, "I Dream of a Better Tomorrow" from a planned musical Naked, based on "The Emperor's New Clothes".

On 4 September 2026, Pet Shop Boys announced that their new album, A Man from the Future, would be released on 9 October. The album, created in collaboration with biographer Andrew Hodges, explores the life, death, and influence of British mathematician and logician Alan Turing (1912–1954). On 18 September, the band released "A Top Secret Washing Machine", a song written as an attack against Vladimir Putin.

== Style and image ==
In 2020, BBC journalist Nick Levine noted that Pet Shop Boys still maintain a somewhat "detached and ambivalent approach" to their success, which also shows in their low profile on social media. Music journalist Steve Harnell described them as having both an "ear for commerciality" and the desire to create "something more highbrow". He also described Tennant's lyrics as showing a "love for language", which Tennant sparkles with sometimes quite-obscure cultural references. Their music in the 1980s was inspired by dance music in gay clubs but transformed into a "very British and brainy brand of pop music, shot through with a streak of social comment so subtly done that people frequently missed the point entirely".

Lowe said in a 1986 Entertainment Tonight interview that he doesn't "like country and western. I don't like rock music, I don't like rockabilly or rock and roll particularly. I don't like much, really, do I? But what I do like, I love passionately. The quote was subsequently sampled in the song "Paninaro". The 1997 B-side "How I Learned to Hate Rock and Roll", and their early 1990s songs "DJ Culture", "Can You Forgive Her?" and "How Can You Expect to Be Taken Seriously?" continued this sentiment. They are still known for openly criticising trends in the music business, such as reality television music shows in 2010 ("it's so awful and negative and stifling, and so un-pop").

Their band dynamic has played a role in their public image. Writing in Creem, Harold DeMuir said their videos "generally contain as little actual physical movement as possible", promoting a "dour, minimalist image"; Tennant said the aim was to avoid the "false enthusiasm" of other pop performances, adding that they did not make "that kind of recording you could mime a guitar solo to, or do a Wham! dance routine to". A typical early performance featured Lowe in the background playing the bassline on a Fairlight synthesiser keyboard and Tennant singing, but otherwise passive, in the foreground. Tennant and Lowe both became well known for standing still throughout performances. In a 2016 interview, Chris Lowe said the duo's live performances were a response to the music scene in the 1980s: "Everyone was so active. It was a big party where everyone was having a great time and smiling at the camera. Thumbs aloft! We just didn't want to do that. So we ignored the cameras and the jollity of the situations. Let's face it, it's easier to stand stock-still isn't it?".

When they first began touring, in 1989, they were heavily influenced by opera and theatre staging. Derek Jarman staged their first tour, making a series of films to be projected behind the costumed singers and dancers. In 1991, they brought in David Alden and David Fielding, from the English National Opera, to create the staging and costume design, for a show which made little attempt to involve or even acknowledge the audience and pushed the choreography and staging centre-stage. Subsequent tours have used artist Sam Taylor-Wood and architect Zaha Hadid for stage design. The Fundamental Tour in 2006–2007 was conceived and designed by theatre designer Es Devlin, with choreography by Hakeem Onibudo. Es Devlin also conceived the 2009–2010 Pandemonium Tour as well as the Electric Tour beginning in 2013.

Typically, Pet Shop Boys have favoured avant-garde tailored fashions. Tennant has referenced the designers of his suits in certain interviews and Lowe has often sported outfits and glasses made by Issey Miyake, Stüssy, and Yohji Yamamoto's Y-3 for Adidas. Presentation has always been a major theme for Pet Shop Boys and the duo have dramatically "re-invented" their image twice in their career. In 1993, when promoting their Very album, they wore brightly coloured costumes and used state-of-the-art computer technology to place themselves in a modern computer graphic world. This concept of re-invention was revisited for the promotion of their Nightlife album, in which they transformed their look, wearing wigs and glasses, with stylised futuristic urban wardrobes. In 2006, both Tennant and Lowe were seen on stage and in photographs wearing clothes designed by Hedi Slimane/Dior Homme, and in 2018 they fronted the Dior Homme SS18 campaign.

They have always been interested in the artwork, design and photography of their own releases. Photographer Eric Watson helped shape the original image of Pet Shop Boys, creating many of their photographs and videos early in their career. In design they have primarily worked with Mark Farrow, who designed the cover of their first Parlophone album release in 1986. The collaboration between Mark Farrow and Pet Shop Boys is comparable to the designer/band relationship of Peter Saville and New Order, Anton Corbijn and Depeche Mode, or the epic-length collaboration of Simon Halfon and Paul Weller. Their record sleeves are quite often very minimal and the attention to detail is obvious. In October 2006, British art publisher Thames & Hudson published a 336-page hardcover book titled Pet Shop Boys Catalogue, by Chris Heath and Philip Hoare, showcasing the group's accomplishments in artwork, design and music. A German-language edition was also published. An exhibition of photographs of Pet Shop Boys was organised at the National Portrait Gallery in London to coincide with the publication.

Even the band's fan base has been subject to commentary. In 2001, music theorist Fred Everett Maus wrote that, contrary to the ideologies of anti-commercialism and authenticity embodied by "serious" discussions of popular music such as rock, Pet Shop Boys fans exhibit "an undisguised love of commercial success". This was demonstrated through mailing list discussions from 1998 onwards, in which fans voiced concern over the "most commercially promising selection and marketing of singles" for the then-upcoming Nightlife, and debated the quality of the then-recent Bilingual, spurred by the album's poorer performance in sales. Most posters, Maus summarised, feared that the band's appeal would become essentially limited to a cult following; "dissent, along the lines that the fans would always have the Pet Shop Boys, no matter what happened commercially, was scarce and ineffectual". Noting the fact that Pet Shop Boys "began their career with hits", Maus made the point that this early success was valued by fans: the band's "large audiences" were just as important to "many fans" as the making of "distinctive music that individual fans loved".

Pet Shop Boys have been noted for keeping their fingers on the musical pulse to date, while "maintaining the mystique of performers from a different era". Lynn Barber, writing for the London Observer on 1 July 1997 stated that "The genius of the Pet Shop Boys was to combine these polar opposites: Neil's wistful introspective lyrics and Chris's mindless, cheerful, upbeat rhythms. They would never have been in the Top 10 without Chris; they would never have engaged an intelligent audience without Neil."

== Influence ==
In 2016, Pet Shop Boys were ranked as the fifth most successful artist on Billboard's now defunct Dance Club Songs chart in the U.S., behind only Madonna, Janet Jackson, Rihanna, and Beyoncé. They were the top-ranked duo or group on the list.

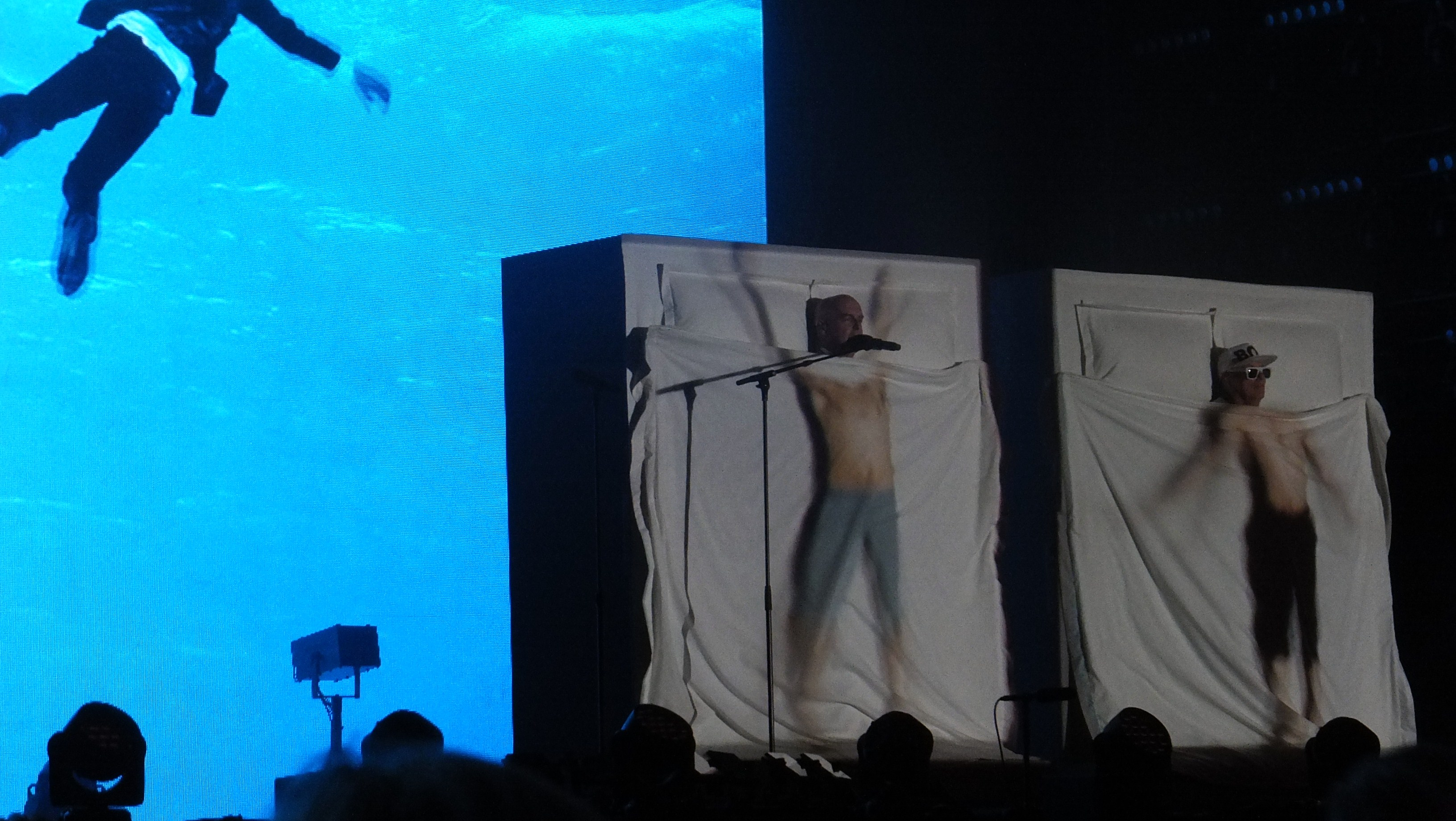
Pet Shop Boys performing at the Flow Festival in Helsinki, 2015

The history between Madonna and Pet Shop Boys goes back to 1988, with the song "Heart". In the liner notes to their 1991 greatest hits album, Discography, the band states that "When we wrote this song ('Heart') we wanted to submit it to Madonna but didn't dare risk disappointment." Pet Shop Boys kept the song for themselves and it ended up going to number one in the UK. Later, in 1991, Madonna was referenced in a tongue-in-cheek lyric, in the song "DJ Culture", soon after she and Sean Penn had divorced. Tennant writes: "Like Liz before Betty / She after Sean / Suddenly you're missing / Then you're reborn". Madonna's album Confessions on a Dance Floor, released November 2005, includes a track called "Jump", which has close similarities to "West End Girls". An interview at Popjustice with Stuart Price, who produced Madonna's album, revealed that the track was a complete Chris Lowe inspiration. Pet Shop Boys then remixed "Sorry", the second single from the album. Madonna has used their version in her 2006 Confessions Tour.

Lady Gaga stated that she listened regularly to Pet Shop Boys while working on her debut album The Fame, and that they were an influence on her music.

In October 2005, a Swedish tribute band called West End Girls had a number-three hit single in their home country, with a cover version of "Domino Dancing". In January 2006, they released their own version of "West End Girls" and an album was also released in June. In August 2014, Pet Shop Boys appeared in the BBC Radio 4 series The Archers as last-minute headliners at the fictional festival Loxfest. Both Tennant and Lowe had speaking roles in the show.

== Sexuality ==
Neil Tennant, who neither denied nor confirmed gay rumours throughout the 1980s, came out in a 1994 interview for Attitude, a UK gay lifestyle magazine. Tennant has said that he does not want to be defined by his sexuality or be labelled as a "gay pop star" out of concern that it would dominate coverage of the Pet Shop Boys. He also noted: "I do think that we have contributed, through our music and also through our videos and the general way we’ve presented things, rather a lot to what you might call 'gay culture'". In 1988, Pet Shop Boys played "It's a Sin" at a benefit opposing the anti-homosexuality law Section 28.

Many of Tennant's lyrics are written using gender-neutral language, as a way to be inclusive. He has also written songs in character from the perspective of women and heterosexual men, and, as he stated in the Attitude interview, he has written songs from his own perspective as a gay man. In 2024, Tennant described the Pet Shop Boys album Nonetheless as "our queer album", with songs like "Love Is the Law", referencing Oscar Wilde, and "New London Boy", recalling his own experiences in London in the early 1970s.

Several Pet Shop Boys songs deal with the AIDS crisis of the 1980s and early 1990s, which they lived through. Tennant wrote a trio of songs about his best friend from Newcastle, Christopher Dowell, who died from the disease in 1989: "It Couldn't Happen Here" alludes to their early complacency, "Being Boring" is an elegy to their friendship, and "Your Funny Uncle" describes his funeral.

In 2026, the duo received the Legend Award at the Virgin Atlantic Attitude Awards. In his acceptance speech, Tennant thanked the LGBTQ+ community and said, "Your lives are our lives, and that's something we try to express in our songs".

== Discography ==
Studio albums

- Please (1986)
- Actually (1987)
- Introspective (1988)
- Behaviour (1990)
- Very (1993)
- Bilingual (1996)
- Nightlife (1999)
- Release (2002)
- Fundamental (2006)
- Yes (2009)
- Elysium (2012)
- Electric (2013)
- Super (2016)
- Hotspot (2020)
- Nonetheless (2024)

== Tours ==
- MCMLXXXIX Tour (1989)
- Performance Tour (1991)
- Discovery Tour (1994)
- Somewhere Residency (1997)
- Nightlife Tour (1999–2000)
- Uni/Release Tour (2002)
- Fundamental Tour (2006–2007)
- Pandemonium Tour (2009–2010)
- Electric Tour (2013–2015)
- Super Tour (2016–2019)
- Unity Tour (with New Order) (2022)
- Dreamworld: The Greatest Hits Live (2022–2026)

== Awards and nominations ==
=== Billboard Music Awards ===
Year	Nominee / work	Award	Result	Ref.
1986	Themselves	Top New Artist	Nominated	
1986	Themselves	Top Billboard 200 Artist	Nominated	
1986	Themselves	Top Hot 100 Artist	Nominated	
1986	Themselves	Top Hot 100 Artist – Duo/Group	Nominated	
1986	Themselves	Top Dance Club Play Artist	Nominated	
1986	Themselves	Top Dance Sales Artist	Nominated	
1986	Please	Top Billboard 200 Album	Nominated	
1986	"West End Girls"	Top Hot 100 Song	Nominated	
1986	"West End Girls"	Top Dance Sales Single	Nominated	
1986	"West End Girls"	Top Dance Club Play Single	Nominated	
1986	"Opportunities (Let's Make Lots of Money)"	Top Dance Club Play Single	Nominated	
1987	"It's a Sin"	Top Dance Club Play Single	Nominated	
1987	Themselves	Top Hot 100 Artist	Nominated	
1987	Themselves	Top Dance Club Play Artist	Nominated	
2007	"Minimal"	Top Dance Club Play Single	Nominated	

=== Brit Awards ===
Year	Nominee / work	Award	Result
1987	Themselves	Best British Group	Nominated
1987	"West End Girls"	Best British Single	Won
1988	Themselves	Best British Group	Won
1988	"Always on My Mind"	Best British Single	Nominated
1988	Actually	Best British Album	Nominated
1989	Introspective	Best British Album	Nominated
1989	Themselves	Best British Group	Nominated
1992	Themselves	Best British Group	Nominated
1994	"Go West"	Best British Video	Nominated
2009	Themselves	Outstanding Contribution to Music	Won
2010	"Go West"	Live Performance of 30 Years	Nominated

=== Grammy Awards ===
Year	Nominee / work	Award	Result
1994	Mark Farrow, Pet Shop Boys and David Wieo for Very Relentless	Best Recording Package	Nominated
1995	Pet Shop Boys, Howard Greenhalgh and Megan Hollister for "Go West"	Best Music Video, Short Form	Nominated
1995	Mark Farrow for "Alternative"	Best Recording Package – Boxed	Nominated
1998	"To Step Aside"	Best Dance Recording	Nominated
2006	"I'm with Stupid"	Best Dance Recording	Nominated
2006	Fundamental	Best Dance/Electronic Album	Nominated
2010	Yes	Best Dance/Electronic Album	Nominated

=== Ivor Novello Awards ===
Year	Nominee / work	Award	Result
1986	"West End Girls"	International Hit of the Year	Won
1986	"West End Girls"	Best Contemporary Song	Nominated
1987	"What Have I Done to Deserve This?"	Best Contemporary Song	Nominated
1987	"It's A Sin"	International Hit of the Year	Won
1990	"Nothing Has Been Proved"	Best Film Theme or Song	Nominated
2000	Themselves	Outstanding Contribution to British Music	Won

=== Lunas del Auditorio ===
Year	Nominee / work	Award	Result
2005	Themselves	Best Foreign Pop Artist	Nominated
2006	Themselves	Best Foreign Pop Artist	Nominated
2010	Themselves	Best Foreign Pop Artist	Nominated

=== Smash Hits Poll Winners Party ===
Year	Nominee / work	Award	Result
1986	Themselves	Best Group	Nominated
1987	Themselves	Best Group	Nominated
1988	Themselves	Best Group	Nominated
1988	Themselves	Worst Group	Nominated
1988	"Heart"	Best Pop Video	Nominated
1990	Themselves	Best Group	Nominated

=== Other awards ===
Year	Awards	Work	Category	Result
1986	Music Week Awards	Themselves	Top Music Week/Studio Week Advertisement Mono	Nominated
1986	MTV Video Music Awards	"West End Girls"	Best New Artist	Nominated
1987	American Music Awards	"West End Girls"	Favorite Pop/Rock Song	Nominated
1987	ASCAP Pop Music Awards	"West End Girls"	Most Performed Song	Won
1987	Bravo Otto Awards	Themselves	Best Rock Band (Silver)	Won
1987	Silver Clef Award	Themselves	Best Newcomer	Won
1988	Berolina Awards	Themselves	Group of the Year	Won
1988	Houston Film Festival	"It Couldn't Happen Here"	Gold July Award	Won
1988	Billboard Music Awards	"What Have I Done to Deserve This?"	Top Dance Club Play Single	Nominated
	ASCAP Pop Music Awards	"What Have I Done to Deserve This?"	Most Performed Song	Won
1991	MTV Video Music Awards	"Being Boring"	Viewer's Choice (Europe)	Nominated
1991	Music Week Awards	"Being Boring"	Music Video of the Year	Won
1992	Pollstar Concert Industry Awards	Performance Tour	Most Creative Stage Production	Nominated
1994	D&AD Awards	"Go West"	Pop Promo Video	Wood Pencil
1994	MTV Europe Music Awards	"Go West"	Best Cover	Won
1994	Effects and Nomination Festival	"Liberation"	Best Music Video	Won
1994	Siggraph Wave Awards	"Liberation"	Best Music Video	Won
1994	Billboard Music Awards	Themselves	Top Hot Dance Music Club Play Artist	Nominated
1999	GAFFA Awards (Denmark)	Themselves	Best Foreign Band	Nominated
1999	Viva Comet Awards	"I Don't Know What You Want"	Best International Video	Won
2000	RSH Gold Awards	Themselves	Best International Band	Won
2003	GLAAD Media Awards	Release	Outstanding Music Artist	Nominated
2003	World Music Awards	Themselves	The World Arts Award	Won
2004	Q Awards	Themselves	Inspiration Award	Won
2007	International Dance Music Awards	Themselves	Best Dance Artist (Group)	Nominated
2007	Webby Awards	Themselves	Websites – Celebrity/Fan	Nominated
2007	GLAAD Media Awards	Fundamental	Outstanding Music Artist	Nominated
2007	RTHK International Pop Poll Awards	"I'm with Stupid"	Top Ten International Gold Songs	Nominated
2008	Cannes International Advertising Festival	"Integral"	Gold Cyber Lion Award	Won
2009	UK Festival Awards	Themselves	Critics' Choice Award	Nominated
2009	Popjustice £20 Music Prize	"Love Etc."	Best British Pop Single	Nominated
2010	International Dance Music Awards	"Love Etc."	Best Pop Dance Track	Nominated
2010	International Dance Music Awards	"Love Etc."	Best Music Video	Nominated
2010	International Dance Music Awards	Themselves	Best Dance Artist (Group)	Nominated
2010	UK Festival Awards	Themselves	Feel-Good Act of the Summer	Nominated
2011	Evening Standard Theatre Awards	The Most Incredible Thing (with Javier de Frutos)	Beyond Theatre Award	Won
2012	Hungarian Music Awards	Themselves	Foreign Electronic Music Production of the Year	Nominated
2013	Q Awards	Themselves	Outstanding Contribution to Music	Won
2015	Mnet Asian Music Awards	Themselves	Worldwide Inspiration Award	Won
2015	British LGBT Awards	Themselves	Best Music Artist	Nominated
2016	Gay Music Chart Awards	"The Pop Kids"	Best Lyric Video	Nominated
2016	Gay Music Chart Awards	"The Pop Kids" (Offer Nissim Remix)	Best Music Video from Israel	Nominated
2016	Abilu Music Awards	Super	International Electronic Album of the Year	Won
2017	NME Awards	Themselves	Godlike Genius Award	Won
2017	San Diego Film Awards	"Twenty-Something"	Best Music Video	Won
2017	RTHK International Pop Poll Awards	Themselves	Top Group/Band	Nominated
2017	RTHK International Pop Poll Awards	"The Pop Kids"	Top Ten International Pop Songs	Nominated
2019	Classic Pop Reader Awards	Further Listening 1984–1986	Reissue of the Year	Nominated
2020	Classic Pop Reader Awards	Themselves	Group of the Year	Nominated
2021	GAFFA Awards	Themselves	Best International Band	Nominated
2021	GAFFA Awards	Hotspot	Best International Album	Nominated
2024	MTV Europe Music Awards	Themselves	Pop Pioneers Award	Won
2024	Artist and Manager Awards	Themselves and Angela Becker	Artist and Manager Partnership Award	Won
2024	British LGBT Awards	Themselves	Music Artist	Nominated
2026	Viña del Mar International Song Festival	Themselves	Gaviota de Plata and Gaviota de Oro	Won
2026	Virgin Atlantic Attitude Awards	Themselves	Legend Award	Won
