= Fundamental (Pet Shop Boys album) =

Studio album by Pet Shop Boys
- Released: 22 May 2006
- Recorded: May–November 2005
- Studio: Sarm West (London)
- Genre: Synth-pop; electronica; disco; dark wave
- Length: 48:39; 50:26 (Fundamentalism)
- Label: Parlophone
- Producer: Trevor Horn

Pet Shop Boys chronology
Battleship Potemkin (2005)	Fundamental (2006)	Concrete (2006)

Singles from Fundamental
- 1. "I'm with Stupid" Released: 8 May 2006; 2. "Minimal" Released: 24 July 2006; 3. "Numb" Released: 16 October 2006

Fundamental is the ninth studio album by English synth-pop duo Pet Shop Boys. It was released in May 2006 in the United Kingdom, Europe, Japan, and Canada, and in late June 2006 in the United States. The album entered the UK Albums Chart at number five on 28 May 2006. In the US the album peaked at number 150 on the Billboard 200, selling 7,500 copies in its first week. As of April 2009 it had sold 46,000 copies in the US and 66,000 copies in the UK.

Fundamental earned two Grammy nominations at the 2007 Grammy Awards for Best Electronic/Dance Album and Best Dance Recording for "I'm with Stupid". The album was generally well received by critics, but its sales failed to improve much on those of their last two albums.

== Background and composition ==
Fundamental features eleven Pet Shop Boys compositions and a song by Diane Warren, "Numb", which was originally intended to be a new track on PopArt: The Hits (2003). Two other songs, "Casanova in Hell" and "Luna Park", were written by the duo during the PopArt sessions; they wrote the rest between January and April 2005 in London and Naples.

In planning for the album, Pet Shop Boys drew up a manifesto of their intention to write songs about authoritarianism and fundamentalism in the contemporary world, with minimal electropop music. The songs turned out to be more epic in scope, and they decided to approach Trevor Horn, with whom they had worked on "Left to My Own Devices" (1989), to be the producer. Recording took place from May to November at Sarm West in London.

The title is intended to convey that the album has a fundamentally Pet Shop Boys sound, in addition to touching on the subject matter.

=== Subject matter ===
The album has been noted for being more political than any other of the duo's albums to date; even the title, in one sense, is a reference to religious fundamentalism – portrayed here in a light, critical manner, which singer Neil Tennant attributes to the relatively relaxed status of religious freedom in the United Kingdom.

Specific contemporary issues discussed in the lyrics include tensions and fears in the United States caused by the war on terrorism, addressed in songs such as "Psychological" and "Luna Park" ("Luna Park" being the name of various amusement parks around the world). Other songs refer to the politics of the band's home country; "Indefinite leave to remain" refers to an immigration status in the United Kingdom, while "Integral" criticises the Identity Cards Act 2006. (A statement from a band spokesman cites the issue as the reason that Tennant ceased his well-publicized support of Tony Blair's Labour Party.) "I'm with Stupid", meanwhile, touches upon both countries by satirizing Blair's alliance with George W. Bush. (See also special relationship.)

Other subject matters are dealt with as well. "Casanova in Hell" is about the 18th century historical figure Giacomo Casanova, and how he immortalized himself by writing memoirs about his history of sexual seduction of numerous women. Tennant refers to, specifically, the book Casanova's Homecoming by Arthur Schnitzler as his inspiration for the song. (It was sung by Rufus Wainwright at its first live performance, at a private concert recorded for BBC Radio 2 at the Mermaid Theatre on 8 May 2006.) "The Sodom and Gomorrah Show" references two of the biblical cities of sin, Sodom and Gomorrah, in saying that to learn to 'go where angels fear to tread' (i.e. to sin) is to learn to live freely.

The liner notes show that the album is dedicated to two executed Iranian gay teenagers, Mahmoud Asgari and Ayaz Marhoni, who were hanged on 19 July 2005. Some reports have suggested the two may have been executed for engaging in homosexual behaviour, though the official Iranian report was that they were hanged for raping a 13-year-old boy.

=== Music ===
The album is Pet Shop Boys' first collaboration with Trevor Horn since the 1989 single "It's Alright". Its sound bears the producer's heavily orchestral style (also present on that song), most frequently associated with the 1982 ABC album The Lexicon of Love as well as the 1984 Frankie Goes to Hollywood single "Two Tribes" and subsequent album Welcome to the Pleasuredome. Horn was also musical director for the Radio 2 concert, which featured the BBC Concert Orchestra.

The album's personnel included many of Horn's frequent musical collaborators, including Anne Dudley, Tessa Niles, Jamie Muhoberac, Phil Palmer, Steve Lipson, Lol Creme, Tim Pierce, Earl Harvin, Frank Ricotti, Luis Jardim, Lucinda Barry.

=== Fundamentalism ===
Special limited editions of the album include a second bonus CD called Fundamentalism. The disc includes remixed tracks with contributions by artists such as Alter Ego. "In Private", here presented as a duet with Elton John, was originally a Dusty Springfield song written and produced by the Pet Shop Boys. First released as a single in 1989, it was later included on the 1990 album Reputation. The powerful opening track "Fugitive" contains lyrics suggestive of a dialogue between a male terrorist and a person who has a close relationship with him — originally conceived by Tennant as the terrorist's sister, but later re-cast in his thoughts as either the terrorist's sister, his brother or a close friend — thus continuing the political themes of the main album.

== Release ==
In December 2005, the official Pet Shop Boys website announced an early track listing for the album and gave an initial release date of 17 April 2006, naming "Minimal" as the lead single. This was followed up on 23 December, when pop music fansite Popjustice gave the first review of the album. The release date of Fundamental was subsequently rescheduled to 22 May 2006 on Parlophone, and "I'm with Stupid" was the lead single with "Minimal" as the follow-up. A limited edition of the album included the bonus CD Fundamentalism. In North America, Rhino Records released the standard and limited editions of the album on 27 June 2006.

In 2017, the album was reissued as Fundamental: Further Listening 2005–2007. The new version was digitally remastered and came with a second disc of B-sides and previously unreleased material from around the time of the album's original release. Fundamental re-entered the UK Albums Chart at number 33 following the reissue.

=== Artwork ===
The album cover is black, with Lowe and Tennant in semidarkness looking up at a white neon sign reading Pet Shop Boys Fundamental. The image represents a "light out of darkness" in the post-9/11 world. The design was inspired by Dan Flavin's art made with fluorescent tubes, which the duo had seen at an exhibit at the Hayward Gallery in London. The cover title and the track listing were created using cold cathode tubes filled with neon and other inert gases depending on the colour of the lettering. Gary Stillwell of the Farrow design firm created a typeface for the release package based on the shape of the tubular signs.

=== Promotion ===
The music video for the lead single, "I'm with Stupid", starred Matt Lucas and David Walliams of the popular comedy series Little Britain. Released as a mobile download in April, the video created "something of a viral phenomenon" according to Music Week. Pet Shop Boys also made original ringtones as a promotion, including "Answer the Phone!", "Where Are You?", and "Water". A Channel 4 career retrospective, Pet Shop Boys: A Life in Pop, aired on 24 May.

The album was launched at a concert at the Mermaid Theatre on 8 May 2006, with musical director Trevor Horn and special guest vocalists Rufus Wainwright, Frances Barber, and Robbie Williams. It was broadcast on BBC Radio 2 and featured songs from Fundamental, including "The Sodom and Gomorrah Show", "Casanova in Hell", "Integral", "Numb", "Luna Park", and "Indefinite Leave to Remain". A recording of the concert was released as the Pet Shop Boys' first live album, Concrete (2006).

The album was also supported by the Fundamental Tour in 2006–2007. A concert filmed in Mexico at the Auditorio Nacional was released on the DVD Cubism in 2007.

=== Singles ===
- "Psychological" – In December 2005, a limited 12-inch white label record of "Psychological" was released. This one-track promo single featured an instrumental mix of the track, clocking in at 4:05.
- "I'm with Stupid" – the first commercially available single from Fundamental released 8 May 2006 in the UK. Bonus tracks included "The Resurrectionist" and "Girls Don't Cry".
- "Minimal" – released 24 July 2006, "Minimal" was announced by the Pet Shop Boys on 6 May as the second commercially available single from Fundamental in the UK. Bonus tracks included "In Private" (featuring Elton John), "Blue on Blue", and "No Time for Tears" from Battleship Potemkin.
- "Numb" – released on 16 October 2006, announced on the official website on 4 September. Bonus tracks included "Party Song", "Bright Young Things", and "Psychological" (Ewan Pearson remix).
- "Integral" – a new version of this song was released to promote the album Disco 4.

== Critical reception ==
Professional ratings
Aggregate scores
Source	Rating
Metacritic	75/100
Review scores
Source	Rating
AllMusic	4/5 stars
Blender	4/5 stars
Entertainment Weekly	B+
The Guardian	4/5 stars
The Independent	5/5 stars
NME	6/10
Pitchfork Media	6.5/10
Q	4/5 stars
Robert Christgau	(2-star Honorable Mention)
Slant Magazine	4.5/5 stars

Fundamental received a weighted average score of 75 out of 100 based on 22 reviews at Metacritic.

Several reviewers compared Fundamental to earlier albums. Following what he termed the "lukewarm reception" of Release (2002), Peter Robinson of The Observer called Fundamental "the Pet Shop Boys' best album in over a decade, sitting neatly between their previous career highpoints of Very and Behaviour, and it propels them back into the pop premier league". Andy Gill of The Independent wrote: "Reuniting the duo once again with Trevor Horn, Fundamental is a confident affirmation of the PSBs' musical strengths. The result may be the very best album of their career, a mature and considered work which satisfies head, heart and feet simultaneously". Popjustice felt it was the duo's best album since Very (1993), whereas NME found "little on PSB's album that matches the big twizzly dunce-hatted glory of their 'Very' peak".

Benjamin Boles of NOW Magazine countered: "Some have said this is the best Pet Shop Boys album in 10 years, but looking back at their last decade of work, that's not really saying that much. For this expedition, they've gone back to their electro-pop fundamentals, and do so quite well for the most part. Unfortunately, it's not that consistent. For every moment of cynical dance pop genius, there's a dull midtempo dirge bereft of decent hooks". Keith Phipps of The A.V. Club described it as "A politically charged album that's free of musical sparks… Trevor Horn… provides characteristically slick production, but there's little to cast light on the gloss, and the political exasperation translates into music that sounds simply exhausted".

== Track listing ==
All tracks are written by Neil Tennant and Chris Lowe, except where noted.

Fundamental
No.	Title	Writer(s)	Length
1.	"Psychological (Note: Contains a sample from 'The Song of the Most Holy Theotokos' from the album Svete Tikhiy (O Gladsome Light) by Alexander Knaifel (ECM, 2002); Tatiana Melentieva, soprano, Andrei Siegle, sampler)"		4:10
2.	"The Sodom and Gomorrah Show"		5:19
3.	"I Made My Excuses and Left"		4:53
4.	"Minimal"		4:21
5.	"Numb"	Diane Warren	4:43
6.	"God Willing"		1:17
7.	"Luna Park"		5:31
8.	"I'm with Stupid"		3:24
9.	"Casanova in Hell"		3:13
10.	"Twentieth Century"		4:39
11.	"Indefinite Leave to Remain"		3:08
12.	"Integral"		3:55

=== Limited edition ===
Disc 2: Fundamentalism
No.	Title	Length
1.	"Fugitive" (Richard X extended mix)	6:06
2.	"Sodom" (Trentemøller remix)	7:24
3.	"Psychological" (Alter Ego remix)	7:13
4.	"Flamboyant" (Michael Mayer Kompakt mix)	7:58
5.	"I'm with Stupid" (Melnyk Heavy Petting mix)	6:07
6.	"In Private" (Stuart Crichton club mix, feat. Elton John)	5:07
7.	"Minimal" (Lobe remix)	4:47
8.	"Gomorrah" (Dettinger remix)	5:39

Japan bonus tracks
No.	Title	Length
9.	"I'm with Stupid" (PSB Maxi-mix)	8:12
10.	"Minimal" (Tiga's M-I-N-I-M-A-L remix)	5:40

iTunes bonus tracks
No.	Title	Length
9.	"The Sodom and Gomorrah Show" (demo version)	5:02
10.	"I'm with Stupid" (demo version)	3:38

=== Remastered edition ===
Disc 2: Further Listening 2005–2007
No.	Title	Writer(s)	Length
1.	"Fugitive" (Richard X extended mix)		6:03
2.	"Ring Road" (demo)		3:36
3.	"The Performance of My Life" (demo)		3:36
4.	"One-Way Street" (demo)		4:00
5.	"Girls Don't Cry"		2:33
6.	"The Resurrectionist"		3:10
7.	"The Sodom and Gomorrah Show" (original demo)		5:19
8.	"Dancing in the Dusk" (demo)		4:11
9.	"After the Event"		5:16
10.	"The Former Enfant Terrible"		2:52
11.	"No Time for Tears" (orchestral mix)		3:23
12.	"God Willing" (original full-length mix)		2:46
13.	"I'm with Stupid" (PSB Maxi-mix)		8:09
14.	"Answer the Phone!" (ringtone)		0:19
15.	"Where Are You?" (ringtone)		0:18
16.	"Water" (ringtone)		0:22
17.	"Numb" (single edit)	Warren	3:29
18.	"One night"		4:05
19.	"A certain 'Je ne sais quoi'"		4:58
20.	"Transfer" (Visionaire mix)		1:04
21.	"Integral" (PSB Perfect Immaculate 7″ mix)		3:21
22.	"Integral" (PSB Perfect Immaculate mix)		7:19
Total length:			79:52

== Personnel ==
Pet Shop Boys

- Neil Tennant – lead and backing vocals, keyboards, guitar
- Chris Lowe – keyboards, synthesizers, drum programming

Guest musicians

- Pete Gleadall – original programming
- Nick Ingman – orchestral arrangement and conduction on tracks 1, 3, 4, 6, 7, 9 & 12
- Alanna Tavernier and Laura Edwards – backing vocals on track 1
- Pete Murray – additional keyboards on track 1, 4, 5, 10 & 11
- Jamie Muhoberac – additional keyboards on tracks 1, 2, 3, 4, 5, 7, 8, 10, 11 & 12; bass on track 4
- Patrick Lannigan – bass on track 1, 3 & 4
- Earl Harvin – vibraphone on tracks 1, 2 & 4; acoustic drums on track 1, 2, 3, 4, 5, 7, 9, 11 & 12; electronic drums on track 1, 2, 3, 4, 7, 8, 9, 10, 11 & 12; marimba on track 2 & 4; bass on track 3
- Skaila Kanga – harp on tracks 1, 3, 4, 6, 7 & 9
- Anne Dudley – orchestral and brass arrangement and conducting on tracks 2 & 11
- Helene Parker, Sarah Eyden, Emma Brain Gabbot and Julia Doyle – backing vocals on track 2
- Tessa Niles – backing vocals on tracks 2, 8, 9 & 12
- Jenny O'Grady – choir master on track 2
- Fred Applegate – narration on track 2
- Oliver Pouliot – additional voice on track 2
- Dave Clayton – additional keyboards and programming on tracks 2, 7 & 9; keyboards and programming on track 6
- Luca Baldini – additional keyboards on tracks 2 & 11, additional programming on track 2
- Phil Palmer – guitar on tracks 2, 4, 7, 8, 9, 10 & 11
- Steve Lipson – guitar on tracks 2 & 12
- Lalo Creme – guitar on tracks 2, 8, 10 & 12
- Trevor Horn – guitar on tracks 2, 6, 9, 11 & 12; bass guitar on tracks 2, 4, 6 & 7; additional keyboards on track 3 & 7; additional vocals on track 4, additional programming on track 7
- Virgil Howe – acoustic drums on track 2; percussion on track 7
- Cliff Hewitt – electronic drums on tracks 2, 7, 8; acoustic drums on track 9; percussion on track 12
- Frank Ricotti – percussion on tracks 2, 7, 9, 10 & 12
- Lucinda Barry – harp on tracks 2, 4, 7, 9 & 12; backing vocals on tracks 9 & 12
- Steve Sidwell – orchestral arrangement and conducting on track 5
- Gavyn Wright – orchestra leader on track 5
- Tim Pierce – acoustic and electric guitars on track 5
- Luís Jardim – percussion on track 5
- Simon Chamberlain – additional keyboards on track 7
- Robert Orton – shaker on track 7
- Debi Doss – backing vocals on tracks 9 & 12
- Andy Caine and Bruce Woolley – backing vocals on track 12

Guests on Fundamentalism

- Pete Gleadall – Original programming
- Richard X – Production on track 1
- Pete Hoffman – Mix on track 1
- Anders Trentemøller – Additional production, instrumentation and remixing on track 2
- Mikael Simpson – Additional bass on track 2
- Roman Flügel and Jörn Elling – Remix and additional production on track 3
- Michael Mayer and Superpitcher – Remix production on track 4
- Melnyk – Remix and additional production on track 5
- Elton John – Duet vocals on track 6
- Stuart Chrichton – Production and mix on track 6
- Lobe – Remix and additional production on track 7
- Olof Dettinger – Remix production on track 8

Technical personnel

- Trevor Horn – producer
- Tim Weidner – recording engineer, vocals recording on track 10
- Robert Orton – recording engineer, mix engineer, vocals recording on tracks 7 & 11
- Taz Mattar – additional recording
- Rob Smith – additional recording
- Pete Gleadall – vocals recording on tracks 1–6, 8, 9 & 12
- Jay 'Buju' Blatch – assistant engineer
- Delaina Sepko – assistant engineer
- Chris Waugh – assistant engineer
- Isobel Griffiths Ltd. – orchestra contractor
- Tony Cousins – mastering
- Tim Young – mastering & 2017 remastering

Artwork

- Farrow/PSB – design, art direction
- John Ross – photography

== Release details ==
The album was released in various countries:

Country	Date	Label	Format	Catalog
Japan	17 May 2006	Toshiba-EMI	CD	TOCP-66524
Japan	17 May 2006	Toshiba-EMI	2CD (Fundamentalism)	TOCP-66581
United Kingdom	22 May 2006	Parlophone	LP	362 8591 / 0946 3 62859 1 7
United Kingdom	22 May 2006	Parlophone	CD	362 8592 / 0946 3 62859 2 4
United Kingdom	22 May 2006	Parlophone	2CD (Fundamentalism)	362 8602 / 0946 3 62860 2 0
Canada	23 May 2006	Parlophone	CD	
Thailand	24 May 2006	Parlophone	CD	0 0946 3 62859 2 4
United States	27 June 2006	Rhino Entertainment	CD	R2 79525 / 0 8122 79525 2 5
United States	27 June 2006	Rhino Entertainment	2CD (Fundamentalism)	R2 79532 / 0 8122 79532 2 5

== Charts ==
=== Weekly charts ===
Weekly chart performance for Fundamental
Chart (2006)	Peak position
Australian Albums (ARIA)	25
Austrian Albums (Ö3 Austria)	23
Belgian Albums (Ultratop Flanders)	33
Belgian Albums (Ultratop Wallonia)	26
Czech Albums (ČNS IFPI)	7
Danish Albums (Hitlisten)	7
Dutch Albums (Album Top 100)	42
European Albums (Billboard)	2
Finnish Albums (Suomen virallinen lista)	9
French Albums (SNEP)	74
German Albums (Offizielle Top 100)	4
Greek Albums (IFPI)	21
Irish Albums (IRMA)	24
Italian Albums (FIMI)	19
Japanese Albums (Oricon)	28
Norwegian Albums (VG-lista)	23
Scottish Albums (OCC)	10
Spanish Albums (Promusicae)	9
Swedish Albums (Sverigetopplistan)	6
Swiss Albums (Schweizer Hitparade)	7
UK Albums (OCC)	5
US Billboard 200	150
US Top Dance Albums (Billboard)	4

Chart (2026)	Peak position
Croatian International Albums (HDU)	14

=== Year-end charts ===
Year-end chart performance for Fundamental
Chart (2006)	Position
US Top Dance/Electronic Albums (Billboard)	25

== Certifications and sales ==
Certifications and sales for Fundamental
Region	Certification	Certified units/sales
United Kingdom (BPI)	Silver	66,000
United States	—	46,000
