= Numb (Pet Shop Boys song) =

Single by Pet Shop Boys

from the album Fundamental
- B-side: "Party Song"; "Bright Young Things"; "Psychological"
- Released: 16 October 2006
- Recorded: 2003; 2005
- Genre: Synth-pop; orchestral pop
- Length: 3:30 (single version); 4:42 (album version)
- Label: Parlophone
- Songwriter: Diane Warren
- Producer: Trevor Horn

Pet Shop Boys singles chronology
"Minimal" (2006)	"Numb" (2006)	"She's Madonna" (2007)

Music video
- "Numb" on YouTube

"Numb" is a song by Diane Warren recorded by English synth-pop duo Pet Shop Boys on their ninth studio album, Fundamental (2006). It was released on 16 October 2006 as the album's third and final single, peaking at number 23 on the UK Singles Chart. Up to that point, it was only the duo's second single in 39 releases to miss the UK top 20 (the other being "Was It Worth It?" from 1991, which peaked at number 24).

== Background and composition ==
Composed by American songwriter Diane Warren, known for many commercial radio-friendly hits, "Numb" was originally acquired by Pet Shop Boys to be one of the new singles on the 2003 compilation PopArt: The Hits. The song was previously offered to Aerosmith, whose song "I Don't Want to Miss a Thing" was written by Warren, but they turned it down.

Pet Shop Boys recorded a demo of "Numb" in 2003. At that time, they asked Trevor Horn to produce it to give the song an epic sound. It opens with a dramatic orchestral intro, arranged by Steve Sidwell. The track was essentially finished when the duo decided to save "Numb" for their next album, Fundamental, which Horn also produced. A few adjustments were made during the 2005 album sessions; Tennant changed the line "what's going down" to "what's going on" to make it sound more English. The single version omits the second verse and repeats the middle section, following the format of an edit of "Numb" made by the BBC for a montage after England was eliminated from the 2006 World Cup.

Warren wrote the song about the death of her mother. The Pet Shop Boys' interpretation alludes to the desire to sequester oneself from distressing news in the modern world. Within the context of Fundamental, the song has been interpreted as a reaction to terrorism after 9/11.

== Cover art ==
The cover photo was taken by Sam Taylor-Wood at the Jerusalem Tavern in Clerkenwell, London. It shows Pet Shop Boys wearing plague doctor masks that were bought in Venice.

== Music video ==
The music video for "Numb" was directed by Julian Gibbs, Julian House, and Chris Sayer, who described it as inspired by "Russian constructivist cinema". The video uses a montage of Russian archival footage to depict a journey across a frozen landscape, reflecting the "emotional numbness" of the song. Tennant and Lowe appear briefly at the end.

Gibbs had previously directed a 2005 BBC television adaptation of The Snow Queen, which Sayer worked on as animation director. In addition, the Gibbs and House pair have previously directed music videos for Primal Scream, Luke Slater, and Doves.

== Release ==
Pet Shop Boys released a new radio edit of "Numb" as the third single from Fundamental, accompanied by new songs "Party Song" and "Bright Young Things" as B-sides. "Bright Young Things" was written and recorded in 2003 with co-production by Chris Zippel. It was originally intended for a film of the same title by Stephen Fry, but the filmmakers decided to use songs from the 1920s era instead.

A new remix of "Psychological" by Ewan Pearson was included on the limited-edition 12-inch release, and the two-track CD1 single included a live version of "West End Girls", which was recorded by BBC Radio 2 at the Mermaid Theatre in May 2006. This track is also featured on the Pet Shop Boys' first live album, Concrete, which was released the week following this single on 23 October 2006.

"Numb" was A-listed on the primary playlists at BBC Radio 2 and Capital Radio. The single peaked at number 23 on the UK Singles Chart, becoming the duo's second-least successful single at the time in terms of chart placement, after "Was It Worth It?" (#24 in 1991). It ranked at number seven on the Physical Singles chart.

== Critical reception ==
Michael Hubbard of MusicOMH called the choice of "Numb" for a single a "surprise" and a "challenge". He described the intro as "the sort of orchestral sweep and drumroll that would herald a hero's death on the silver screen. As dramatic openings go, this well sets the scene for what follows". He concluded: "Having shown their deep, thoughtful side, hopefully the next single will be Integral".

== Live performances ==
"Numb" was performed on the Fundamental Tour and was included in the concert film Cubism. The song was also played with the BBC Concert Orchestra at a concert at the Mermaid Theatre in London in May 2006, which was released as the live album Concrete.

== Usage in other media ==
BBC used the song as the closing montage following England's defeat to Portugal in the 2006 World Cup quarter-final.

== Track listings ==
"Numb" is written by Diane Warren; additional tracks are by Neil Tennant and Chris Lowe.

- UK CD single (CDR 6723)
1. "Numb" (new radio version) – 3:30
2. "West End Girls" (live at the Mermaid Theatre) – 4:55
- UK CD maxi single (CDRS 6723)
1. "Numb" (PSB original demo) – 3:40
2. "Party Song" – 3:44
3. "Bright Young Things" – 4:57
4. "Numb" (music video) – 4:40

Tracks 2 and 3 on this release are reversed, making the track listing incorrect.
"Party song" includes elements of "That's the Way (I Like It)" by KC and the Sunshine Band.

- UK limited-edition 7-inch single (R 6723)

A. "Numb" (new radio version) – 3:30
B. "Party Song" – 3:44

- UK limited-edition 12-inch single (12R 6723)

A1. "Numb" (album version) – 4:44
A2. "Numb" (a cappella) – 3:29
B. "Psychological" (Ewan Pearson mix) – 8:37

== Personnel ==
Personnel are adapted from the liner notes for Fundamental: Further Listening 2005–2007 and "Numb".

Pet Shop Boys

- Neil Tennant
- Chris Lowe

Additional musicians

- Gavyn Wright – orchestra leader
- Pete Murray – additional keyboards
- Jamie Muhoberac – additional keyboards
- Tim Pierce – acoustic guitars, electric guitars
- Earl Harvin – acoustic drums
- Luís Jardim – percussion
- Pete Gleadall – original programming
- Sylvia Mason-James – additional vocals (radio version)

Technical

- Trevor Horn – production
- Steve Sidwell – orchestral arrangement, conducting
- Robert Orton – recording engineering
- Tim Lambert – additional engineering
- Tim Weidner – engineering, mixing
- Phil Tyreman – engineering assistance
- Isobel Griffiths – orchestra contractor

Artwork

- Farrow and PSB – design, art direction
- Sam Taylor-Wood – photography

== Charts ==
Chart performance for "Numb"
Chart (2006)	Peak position
Denmark (Tracklisten)	5
Germany (GfK)	72
Ireland (IRMA)	47
Scotland Singles (OCC)	18
UK Singles (OCC)	23
