= A Top Secret Washing Machine =

2026 song by Pet Shop Boys

Song by Pet Shop Boys
- Released: 18 September 2026
- Length: 2:44
- Label: x2; Parlophone
- Songwriters: Neil Tennant; Chris Lowe
- Producer: Pet Shop Boys

"A Top Secret Washing Machine" (stylised in sentence case) is a song by English synth-pop duo Pet Shop Boys that was released on 18 September 2026 through the band's own label x2 and Parlophone. The song is written as an attack against Vladimir Putin.

== Background ==
The duo had previously written songs about Putin, with their 2023 song "Living in the Past", which compared Putin to Joseph Stalin.

== Composition and lyrics ==
Tennant asks sarcastic questions about the Russian president in the song, with the main question being who washes his underwear and keeps secrets "in a top secret washing machine". The lyrics also contain lines about what happens when Putin "poisons an opponent's underpants", with Tennant wondering whether if Putin would laugh at his "brilliant scheme".
