= I'm with Stupid (Pet Shop Boys song) =

2006 single by Pet Shop Boys

Single by Pet Shop Boys

from the album Fundamental
- B-side: "The Resurrectionist" (CD Single); "Girls Don't Cry" (7")
- Released: 8 May 2006
- Genre: Synth-pop; electro
- Length: 3:27
- Label: Parlophone
- Songwriters: Neil Tennant; Chris Lowe
- Producer: Trevor Horn

Pet Shop Boys singles chronology
"Flamboyant" (2004)	"I'm with Stupid" (2006)	"Minimal" (2006)

Music video
- "I'm with Stupid" on YouTube

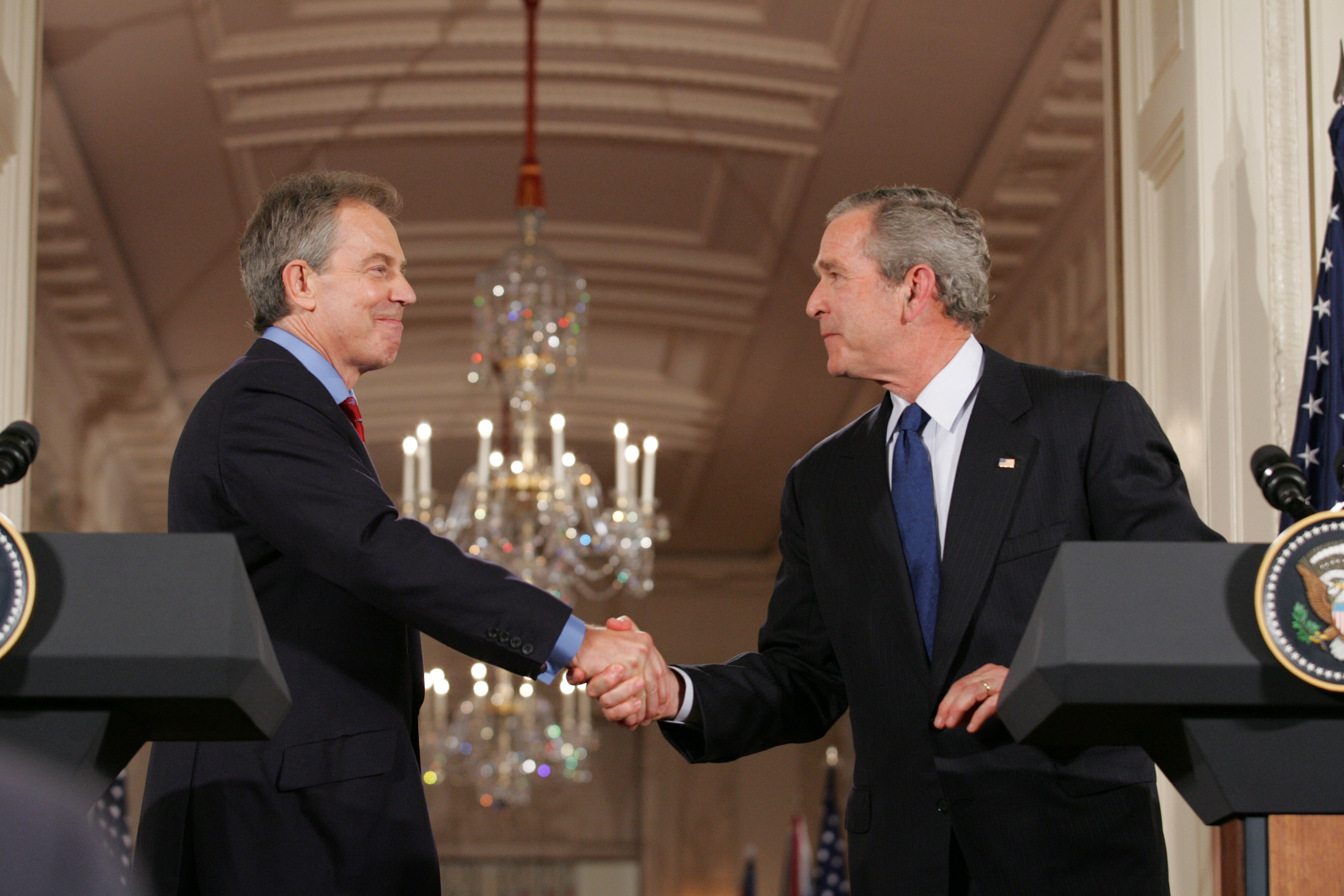
UK Prime Minister Tony Blair (left) and US President George W. Bush (right) in 2006. "I'm with Stupid" has been acknowledged as referring to their relationship.

"I'm with Stupid" is a song by English synth-pop duo Pet Shop Boys from their ninth studio album, Fundamental (2006). It was released on 8 May 2006 as the album's lead single. It became the duo's 21st top-10 single in the United Kingdom, peaking at number 8. The song was nominated for Best Dance Recording at the 49th Annual Grammy Awards.

== Background and composition ==
Though ostensibly about a romantic relationship with a man perceived by the public as a "moron", the song has been acknowledged as being, on another level, about Tony Blair's beleaguered "special relationship" with George W. Bush. The protagonist of the song is eventually brought to wonder if the other's stupidity might not be a front:

Is stupid really this stupid
or a different kind of smart?
Do we really have a relationship
so special in your heart?

The title was inspired by the novelty t-shirts with the slogan and an arrow pointing at the person standing next to the wearer.

== Release ==
"I'm with Stupid" was selected as the lead single from Fundamental because Pet Shop Boys felt it reflected the theme and attitude of the album. It replaced the originally announced "Minimal", which had been the preferred choice of Parlophone after the label rejected the duo's initial suggestion of "The Sodom and Gomorrah Show". "Minimal" subsequently became the second single.

"I'm with Stupid" was released on CD, DVD, and 7-inch vinyl picture disc formats. The DVD included the music video. Remixers of the single include Melnyk, Max Tundra, Abe Duque and Pet Shop Boys themselves. Several of the official remixes were not released on physical media, being exclusively available on the iTunes Store and other digital music stores, due to Official Charts Company rules limiting the number of physical single versions. The Melnyk remix appeared on Fundamentalism with the special edition of the album, and the PSB Maxi-mix was included on Disco 4 (2007) and on the reissue, Fundamental: Further Listening 2005–2007 (2017).

While not released commercially in the US, promotional copies of the single were distributed by Rhino Records, and it reached number seven on Billboard magazine's Hot Dance Club Play chart.

One of the single's B-sides, "The Resurrectionist", in keeping with the group's fondness for unusual historical subject matter in their songs, is about body-snatching in the English Regency era, carried out by people called resurrectionists. Lyricist Neil Tennant was inspired by the book The Italian Boy: Murder and Grave-Robbery in 1830s London (2004) by Sarah Wise. Several historic locations mentioned in the song were near the duo's studio in London, including Blackfriars Bridge, St Bartholomew's Hospital (called Barts), and the former site of The Fortune of War pub.

=== Artwork ===
The single artwork is a play on the "I'm with stupid" slogan, with red and blue neon arrows alternately pointing at Tennant, Lowe, or both. The photos were taken by John Ross as the illuminated arrows were switched on and off. The 7-inch picture disc was black with a red arrow on side A and a blue arrow on side B.

=== Promotion and live performances ===
The song was A-listed to the primary BBC Radio 2 playlist. The video was previewed exclusively on the mobile network 3 as part of a promotion capitalising on the increase in music sales via mobile downloads.

"I'm with Stupid" was performed on the 23 April 2006 episode of Top of the Pops, in the last in a long series of Pet Shop Boys performances on the UK music programme. The performance was planned to include six dancers, wearing masks depicting Blair's and Bush's faces. The BBC's editorial department objected, however, citing the need to be politically "impartial"; in the end, only one Blair mask and one Bush mask was used, with the remaining four masks replaced by ones depicting Bill Clinton, David Cameron, Menzies Campbell, and Vladimir Putin. The song was later performed in Germany in the form the BBC had objected to.

The song was also performed on the Fundamental Tour (2006–07) and was included in the concert film DVD Cubism.

== Music video ==
The video was directed by Rob Leggatt and filmed at Alexandra Palace in North London. It features David Walliams and Matt Lucas of Little Britain staging a performance in which they play the roles of Tennant and Lowe and mime "I'm with Stupid" while dressed in Very-era outfits (mainly from the "Can You Forgive Her?" and "Go West" promotional campaigns). They are accompanied by a group of dancers, also dressed in similar costumes. The video ends with Walliams and Lucas asking for the approval of the audience, which is revealed to be Tennant and Lowe themselves, bound to their seats.

== Critical reception ==
Peter Robinson of Popjustice described "I'm with Stupid" as "Everything you want from a Pet Shop Boys single: huge production on a song which works on at least two levels and is as funny as it is poignant". Music Week named it their Single of the Week, stating: "This highly anticipated reunion with Trevor Horn is ideal for the Boys' lush and emotional sound".

Michael Hubbard of MusicOMH wrote: "Musically it's right up there with the best of the Pets' work and sends a thrill of anticipation across airwaves in advance of parent album Fundamental". Anthony Strutt of Pennyblackmusic wrote: "This is classic the Pet Shop Boys with crystal vocals from Neil Tennant and big keyboards from Chris Lowe. It is head bopping pop". He also called the B-side, "The Resurrectionist", a "very commercial hands in the air anthem".

== Track listings ==
- UK CD single (CDR6690)
1. "I'm with Stupid" – 3:27
2. "The Resurrectionist" – 3:12
- UK 7-inch picture disc (R6690)

A. "I'm with Stupid" – 3:27
B. "Girls Don't Cry" – 2:35

- UK DVD single (DVDR6690)
1. "I'm with Stupid" – 3:27
2. "The Resurrectionist" (Goetz B. Extended Mix) – 5:40
3. "Girls Don't Cry" – 2:35
4. "I'm with Stupid" (video) – 3:58
- European CD single (362 8482)
1. "I'm with Stupid" – 3:27
2. "The Resurrectionist" – 3:12
- European CD maxi single (362 8552)
1. "I'm with Stupid" – 3:27
2. "The Resurrectionist" (Goetz B. Extended Mix) – 5:40
3. "Girls Don't Cry" – 2:35
- European DVD single (362 7889)
1. "I'm with Stupid" – 3:27
2. "The Resurrectionist" (Goetz B. Extended Mix) – 5:40
3. "Girls Don't Cry" – 2:35
4. "I'm with Stupid" (video) – 3:58
5. "I'm with Stupid" (making of)

== Personnel ==
Credits adapted from the liner notes of Fundamental: Further Listening 2005–2007 and "I'm with Stupid".

Pet Shop Boys

- Chris Lowe
- Neil Tennant

Additional musicians

- Tessa Niles – backing vocals
- Jamie Muhoberac – additional keyboards
- Phil Palmer – electric guitar
- Lalo Creme – electric guitar, acoustic guitar
- Cliff Hewitt – electronic drums
- Earl Harvin – electronic drums

Technical personnel

- Trevor Horn – producer
- Tim Weidner – recording engineer
- Robert Orton – recording engineer, mix engineer
- Rob Smith – additional recording

Artwork

- Farrow/PSB – design, art direction
- John Ross – photography

== Charts ==
Chart performance for "I'm with Stupid"
Chart (2006)	Peak position
Australia (ARIA)	23
Belgium (Ultratip Bubbling Under Flanders)	4
Belgium (Ultratip Bubbling Under Wallonia)	6
Denmark (Tracklisten)	3
Germany (GfK)	29
Greece (IFPI)	19
Ireland (IRMA)	23
Netherlands (Single Top 100)	64
Romania (Romanian Top 100)	61
Scotland Singles (OCC)	9
Slovakia Airplay (ČNS IFPI)	90
Spain (Promusicae)	5
Sweden (Sverigetopplistan)	10
Switzerland (Schweizer Hitparade)	38
UK Singles (OCC)	8
US Dance Club Songs (Billboard)	7

== Release history ==
Release dates and formats for "I'm with Stupid"
Region	Date	Format(s)	Label(s)	Ref.
United Kingdom	8 May 2006	CD	Parlophone	
Australia	15 May 2006	CD	Parlophone	
