= Battleship Potemkin (album) =

Soundtrack album by Tennant/Lowe
- Released: 5 September 2005
- Recorded: 2003–2004
- Studio: Studio PSB (Durham); The Strongroom (London); Teldex (Berlin) (Note: Orchestra recording, July 2004)
- Genre: Electronica; orchestral
- Length: 68:29
- Label: EMI Classics/Parlophone
- Producer: Pet Shop Boys; Sven Helbig

Pet Shop Boys chronology
| Back to Mine (2005) | Battleship Potemkin (2005) | Fundamental (2006) |

Battleship Potemkin is a 2005 album of electronic and orchestral music written by Neil Tennant and Chris Lowe of Pet Shop Boys, to accompany the 1925 silent film Battleship Potemkin by Sergei Eisenstein. It was performed by Tennant, Lowe, and the Dresdner Sinfoniker, conducted by Jonathan Stockhammer, with orchestrations by Torsten Rasch, and was produced by Pet Shop Boys and Sven Helbig. The work was premiered alongside the film at an event in Trafalgar Square on 12 September 2004. The album was released in September 2005 under the composers' names, Tennant/Lowe, as is customary with classical releases.

In 2025, for the centenary of Battleship Potemkin, the British Film Institute released a restored version of the film with the Tennant/Lowe score on Blu-ray, with a limited theatrical release. The album was also reissued by Parlophone as a remastered CD and a double vinyl LP.

== Background and composition ==
In April 2003, Pet Shop Boys were asked by Philip Dodd, director of the Institute of Contemporary Arts in London, to compose a new film score for Battleship Potemkin to accompany a screening in Trafalgar Square as part of a series of events organised by the Mayor of London, Ken Livingstone. Despite his interest in Russian history, Tennant was initially reluctant; it was Lowe who found the idea of writing music to go with the visuals of a silent film appealing.

The duo worked on the score in the summer of 2003 and spring of 2004, writing the music in order with a DVD of the film as a guide. They used keyboards synced to the video to compose the music. Imagery from the film inspired their choices, like the industrial sounds on "Full Steam Ahead" mirroring the ship's engines in Act V. Some sound effects, like the smashing plate at the end of Act I, were incorporated into the score.

The lyrics of the vocal pieces were mainly drawn from words in the film's original intertitles. For the song "After All (The Odessa Staircase)", Tennant was also influenced by the setting of Trafalgar Square as a place of political dissent in London, which was the reason the site had been chosen for the screening. Recent demonstrations in the square against the Iraq War held special significance, reflected in the line, "How come we went to war?"

Tennant and Lowe decided to combine electronic music and strings in the score, and they contacted composer Torsten Rasch after hearing his song cycle Mein Herz brennt, based on the music of the rock group Rammstein. The Dresdner Sinfoniker, conducted by Jonathan Stockhammer, recorded the orchestrations at Teldex Studio in Berlin in July 2004.

== Performances ==
The first performance of the score on 12 September 2004 in Trafalgar Square drew a crowd of approximately 25,000 on a rainy Sunday evening. The duo and the orchestra performed behind gauze below the film screen. Theatre actor and director Simon McBurney introduced the event with a commentary on the political history of protests in Trafalgar Square.

In September 2005, Pet Shop Boys and the Dresdner Sinfoniker took the concerts to Germany and performed in Frankfurt, Bonn, Berlin, and Hamburg to promote the release of the album. A concert on 1 May 2006 with the Northern Sinfonia at the Swan Hunter shipyard in North Tyneside had a crowd of up to 14,000.

On 20 July 2006 in Dresden, home of the Dresdner Sinfoniker, a special production called Die Hochhaussinfonie, or the Skyscraper Symphony, took place at an East German-era housing block on Prager Strasse. The orchestra performed on 43 illuminated balconies, and Tennant and Lowe were above a screen showing Battleship Potemkin, with 10,000 spectators gathered below. The site was chosen for its role as a focal point during the political upheaval of 1989; before the film, historic images from surveillance cameras and archives were projected onto the building.

Pet Shop Boys performed the score with the BBC Concert Orchestra for a film screening at the Barbican in London on 11 January 2008. A performance of Battleship Potemkin in Red Square, Moscow, was discussed but did not take place. In an interview for the BBC in September 2005, Tennant mentioned that they were interested in performing the score in Iran and China, but that Iran had declined their proposal.

=== Tour dates ===
2004

- 12 September – Trafalgar Square, London, England

2005

- 2 September – Alte Oper, Frankfurt, Germany
- 3 September – Museumsmeile, Bonn, Germany
- 4 September – Museumsmeile, Berlin, Germany
- 5 September – Stadtpark, Hamburg, Germany

2006

- 1 May – Swan Hunter Shipyard, Newcastle upon Tyne, England
- 20 July – Prager Strasse, Dresden, Germany
- 29 July – Gardens of the Royal Palace of La Granja, Segovia, Spain

2008

- 11 January – Barbican Theatre, London

== Release ==
The album was released on the EMI Classics label of Parlophone Records on 5 September 2005, a year after the first performance. The length of the album differed from the full score; a brief edit was made to "Comrades!", while "Men and Maggots" was cut from nine and a half to five minutes to remove repetitive sequences underscoring the sailors' chores. In the United States, the album was released as a digital download by Astralwerks on 17 May 2011.

A 7-inch mix of the song "No Time For Tears" was released in 2006 as a B-side on the DVD format of the single, "Minimal". An orchestral mix of the song is included on the Fundamental: Further Listening 2005–2007 reissue.

On 5 September 2025, a remastered version of the album was released by Parlophone on CD and double vinyl LP. The BFI simultaneously released a Blu-ray of the film, restored by Deutsche Kinemathek, featuring the Tennant/Lowe score, packaged with a CD of the music. The film was also shown in selected cinemas in the UK and Ireland. The reissue marked the centenary of the 1925 film. Special features on the Blu-ray include a highlight reel from the Trafalgar Square concert and a documentary by Bettina Renner on the 2006 Hochhaussinfonie performance in Dresden.

== Critical reception ==
=== Concert ===
In a review of the 2004 performance in Trafalgar Square, Tim Cummings of The Independent wrote: "What accompanies the opening images of the ship and its men is an update on systems music, Ashra-tinged guitar, a superlative clubland take on the Kosmische music of the 70's, with its spirit of uprising and entrancement. It provided a superlative musical pulse to accompany Eisenstein's visual and editing genius". Maddy Costa of The Guardian commented: "The Pet Shop Boys have never written a soundtrack before and it showed. There was not enough space, enough silence, enough colour in their music - and because it lacked contrast, there was not enough power. Stranger still, the music sounded incredibly dated at times, like a hangover from the worst days of 1970s prog rock". She also noted that the screen was positioned too low, obscuring the view for a portion of the crowd.

=== Album ===
Reviewing the 2005 soundtrack album for The Times, Martin Aston observed: "the pair haven't missed the opportunity to stretch themselves. Drama in the Harbour is a mini movie all in itself, involving jazzy trumpets, electronic menace, simmering strings, choral drama and Tennant's forlorn refrain, and as the on-screen mutiny becomes a massacre, the music racks up the tension. Given the cinematic range of their past work, it's no surprise that their first original soundtrack is this strong". Luke Turner of Playlouder noted: "even when listened to in its own right, the Pet Shop Boys' music is among their finest work in years. The string arrangements are suitably grandiose, the electronics subtle and added at just the right moments, and Neil Tennant's occasional vocal touches are judicious". Kitty Empire of The Guardian commented: "Tennant and Lowe's 'foreground music' marshals big strings and ill-boding electronics to this tale of pre-Russian Revolutionary mutiny. Quite why T&L decide to take the whole thing out clubbing on the pulsating 'Odessa Staircase' (where the pram rolls down the steps) is a bit of a conundrum, but, by and large, this soundtrack satisfies, even dissociated from the visuals".

In a Blogcritics review, Michael Melchor wrote: "The music reflects the mood of the movie while retaining an edge of musical simplicity so as to enhance a film and not overtake it. Battleship Potemkin combines electronica and orchestra in subtle ways to play along with the movie". A reviewer on Drowned in Sound said, "Battleship Potemkin has a majestic grandeur which is, quite literally, breathtaking and which doesn't shrink from attempting to do justice to the themes it soundtracks". Sarah McDonnell of MusicOMH described the album as "something of a patchy affair", but noted: "While it's hard to say from the soundtrack alone how well it complements the film, the music is certainly strong enough to stand up without visual aid".

A Virgin.net reviewer gave Battleship Potemkin two stars, explaining: "It works occasionally as an album of neo-electronica, the nine minute long epic Drama In The Harbour being one of the highlights, with its echoes of Ennio Morricone's score for John Carpenter's The Thing, or Odessa, which could be an upbeat Tangerine Dream tune. Otherwise it's a tad kitchy, blending less than successfully modern blips and bleeps with neo-classical music. In fact, as a piece of classical music it barely registers and the inclusion of string movements does not especially change that". Dan Cairns of The Sunday Times compared the album to the previous year's concert: "On disc, though, most of the Boys' score is a mush of awkward tailoring, written to fit a vision that wasn't, crucially, their own".

=== Blu-ray ===
In a review of the 2025 re-release of the film with the Tennant/Lowe score, Peter Bradshaw of The Guardian remarked: "it is a fervent, continuous score but not, for me, one that engages fully with the drama's light-and-shade. It also perhaps reopens the debate about when and how a silent-movie musical accompaniment should be content to fall silent in favour of discreet ambient background sound". Kevin Maher of The Times observed: "This version [...] will doubtlessly enrage the purists and cineastes who can't imagine a marriage of ingenious Russian propaganda and frothy dance beats. Yet it works, and sometimes exquisitely so. The cleaned-up print and thumping score give Eisenstein an urgency and an emotional wallop that he hasn’t had in, well, 100 years".

== Track listing ==
All tracks are written by Neil Tennant and Chris Lowe, with orchestrations by Torsten Rasch on tracks 1, 4–10, 14 and 15.

1. "'Comrades!'" – 3:52
2. "Men and Maggots" – 4:57 (Note: "Men and Maggots" contains a sample of "Charade" by Henry Mancini and Johnny Mercer)
3. "Our Daily Bread" – 0:52
4. "Drama in the Harbour" – 9:00
5. "Nyet" – 6:14
6. "To the Shore" – 3:12
7. "Odessa" – 6:50
8. "No Time for Tears" – 4:32
9. "To the Battleship" – 4:34
10. "After All (The Odessa Staircase)" – 7:23
11. "Stormy Meetings" – 1:31
12. "Night Falls" – 5:55
13. "Full Steam Ahead" – 1:50
14. "The Squadron" – 4:24
15. "For Freedom" – 3:17

== Personnel ==
Credits are adapted from the liner notes of Battleship Potemkin.

Pet Shop Boys

- Neil Tennant
- Chris Lowe

Additional musicians

- Pete Gleadall – programming
- Dave Clayton – additional keyboards, programming
- Markus Schwind – trumpet

Orchestra

The Dresdner Sinfoniker (tracks 1, 4–10, 14, 15)

- Jonathan Stockhammer – conductor
- Marian Krae – violin
- Florian Mayer – violin
- Tilman Baubkus – violin
- Branislaw Blatny – violin
- Halina Deutschmann-Hütt – violin
- Steffen Gaitzsch – violin
- Juliane Heinze – violin
- Meta Hüper – violin
- Katrin Kösler – violin
- Christian Küstermann – violin
- Antje Löhr – violin
- Christiane Thiele – violin
- Robert Hartung – viola
- Annegret Meder – viola
- Eva Oppl – viola
- Kirstin Maria Pientka – viola
- Franziska Weiß – viola
- Sabine Grüner – cello
- Johannes Keltsch – cello
- Katrin Meingast – cello
- Victor Meister – cello
- Benjamin Schwarz – cello
- Tom Bruhn – double bass
- Tom Götze – double bass
- Matthias Morche – double bass

Technical personnel

- Pet Shop Boys – production
- Sven Helbig – production
- Goetz Botzenhardt – mixing, engineering
- Pete Gleadall – engineering
- Joel Iwataki – orchestra recording engineer
- Holger Schwark – orchestral Pro Tools operator
- Joerg Surrey – orchestral Pro Tools engineer
- Phil Tyreman – mix engineer (Note: Mixed at Whitfield Street Studios, London)
- Tim Young – mastering (Note: Mastered at Metropolis Studios, London)

== Chart performance ==
Chart performance for Battleship Potemkin
| Chart (2005) | Peak position |
|---|---|
| German Albums (Offizielle Top 100) | 54 |
| UK Albums (OCC) | 97 |

| Chart (2025) | Peak position |
|---|---|
| Hungarian Physical Albums (MAHASZ) | 14 |
| UK Soundtrack Albums (OCC) | 2 |

== Release history ==
| Region | Date | Label | Format | Ref. |
|---|---|---|---|---|
| United Kingdom | 5 September 2005 | EMI Classics/Parlophone | CD | |
| United States | 17 May 2011 | Astralwerks | digital download | |
| United Kingdom | 5 September 2025 | Parlophone | remastered CD; double LP | |
| United Kingdom | 5 September 2025 | BFI | limited edition Blu-ray & CD | |
