= Pet Shop Boys discography =

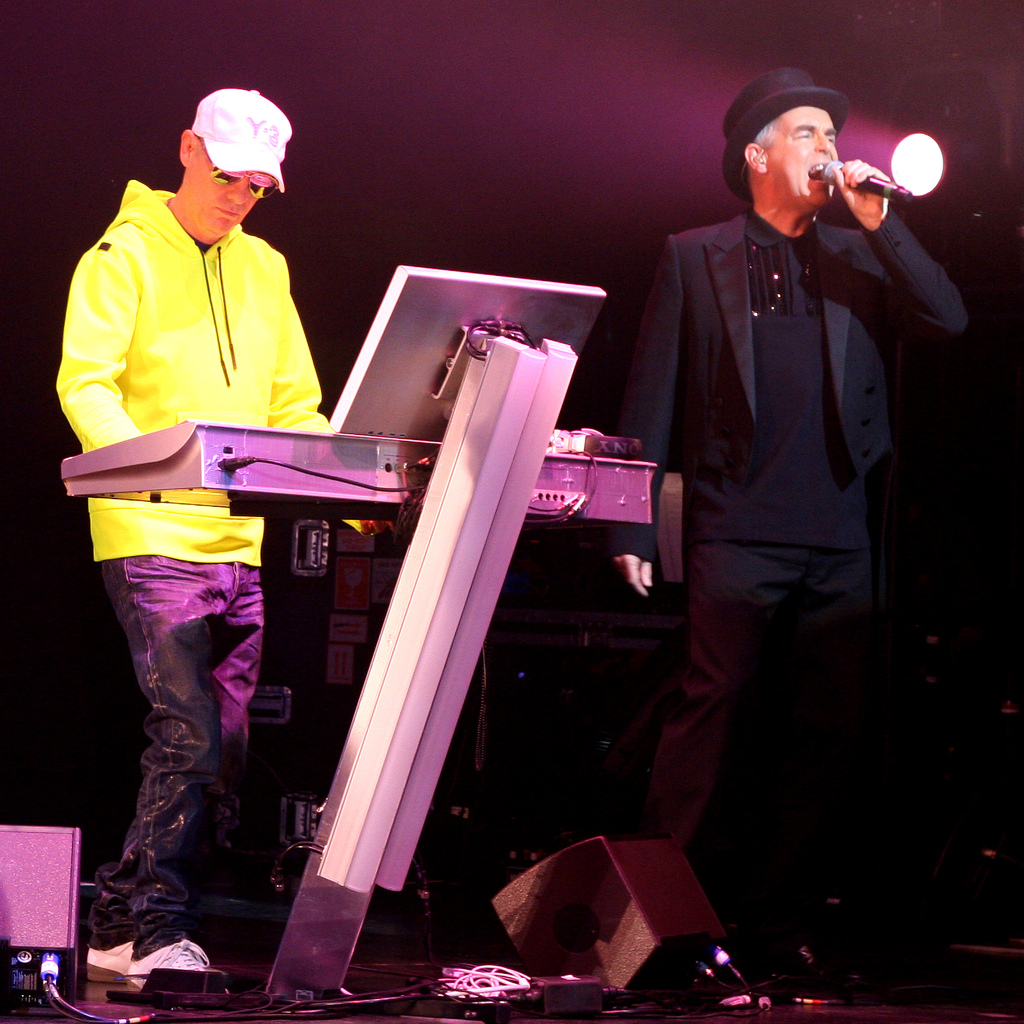
- Pet Shop Boys performing in Boston, October 2006
- Studio albums: 15
- Extended plays: 4
- Soundtrack albums: 6
- Live albums: 5
- Compilation albums: 9
- Singles: 79
- Video albums: 17
- Music videos: 60
- Remix albums: 5

British synth-pop duo Pet Shop Boys have released 15 studio albums, five live albums, nine compilation albums, five remix albums, five soundtrack albums, four extended plays and over seventy singles. The duo's debut single, "West End Girls", was first released in 1984 but failed to chart in most regions. However, the song was entirely re-recorded in late 1985, and this newly recorded version became their first number-one single, topping the UK Singles Chart, Billboard Hot 100 and Canadian Singles Chart. Parlophone released the duo's debut album, Please, in the United Kingdom in March 1986. It peaked at number three on the UK Albums Chart and was certified platinum by the British Phonographic Industry (BPI). It also peaked at number seven on the Billboard 200 in the United States and was certified platinum by the Recording Industry Association of America (RIAA). The following summer they released "It's a Sin", the lead single from their second album, Actually. The single became another UK number one and also reached number nine in the US. This was followed by "What Have I Done to Deserve This?", with Dusty Springfield, which peaked at number two in both the UK and US. In the summer of 1987, the Pet Shop Boys recorded a cover of Brenda Lee's song "Always on My Mind", which became their third UK number-one single over Christmas 1987. This was followed by another UK number one, "Heart", in spring 1988. The album Actually was released in September 1987, peaked at number two in the UK and was certified three-times platinum by the BPI.

The duo's third album, Introspective, was released in October 1988 and peaked at number two in the UK and Germany and was certified two-times platinum by the BPI. Their next album, Behaviour, arrived in 1990 and became their third album in a row to debut and peak at number two in the UK. The duo then released their first hits compilation, Discography, which included all of their single releases as well as two new tracks. In 1993 they released a cover of the Village People single "Go West", which reached number two in the UK. The duo's fifth album, Very, followed and is the only Pet Shop Boys album, so far, to reach number one in the UK. In 1994 they recorded the Comic Relief charity single, "Absolutely Fabulous", under the pseudonym of Absolutely Fabulous. The duo do not consider it as a Pet Shop Boys single release and it was not included on any of their "best-of" albums. The duo then released a B-side collection album, Alternative, in 1995. "Se a vida é (That's the Way Life Is)", was released in the summer of 1996, a Latin American music-inspired track, featuring a drum sample, which preceded the sixth Pet Shop Boys album, Bilingual.

Nightlife, the duo's seventh album came in 1999, followed by the modestly successful album Release in 2002. In November 2003, Pet Shop Boys released a second greatest hits album, PopArt: The Hits. The ninth Pet Shop Boys studio album, Fundamental, came in May 2006, reaching number five in the UK. Also in 2006, Concrete was released, a live album recorded at the Mermaid Theatre, London. Released in UK in March 2009, Yes, was a critical success and hit number four, their highest album chart peak in more than a decade. The Pet Shop Boys also received the BPI's award for "Outstanding Contribution to British Music", at the 2009 Brit Awards ceremony. In December 2009, they released an EP of covers, remixes, and new material, titled Christmas.

Ultimate, the one-disc compilation, was released on 1 November 2010 to celebrate 25 years since the band's first single release. The special version included a DVD with over three hours of BBC TV performances of 27 singles by Pet Shop Boys, released by arrangement with BBC Music, as well as the complete Glastonbury Festival performance from June 2010. Ultimate peaked at 27 on the UK charts. The second B-side compilation album, Format, was released on 6 February 2012, reaching number 26 in the UK. The duo released their eleventh studio album, Elysium, in late 2012, reaching number 9 in the UK. Elysium spawned the singles "Winner", "Leaving" and "Memory of the Future".

In March 2013, the Pet Shop Boys started a new chapter in their career when they left their long-term label, Parlophone, and signed with Kobalt Label Services. A new album, Electric, was released in July 2013, reaching number three in the UK and number 26 in the United States, their highest-peaking album for nearly 20 years in both countries. The singles from this album were "Axis", "Vocal", "Love is a Bourgeois Construct", "Thursday" (featuring Example) and "Fluorescent". The duo undertook a worldwide tour to support the album. In November 2014, they returned to the studio to begin working on their next album with Electric producer Stuart Price. Super was released on 1 April 2016. The first single was "The Pop Kids", made available on 16 February 2016. Super debuted at number three in the UK and at number 58 on the Billboard 200, and it topped Billboard's Dance/Electronic Albums chart as the duo's first number one since Disco 3 in 2003. The live album Inner Sanctum was recorded at the Royal Opera House during the Super Tour. The 2020 release Hotspot completed the Berlin trilogy of albums produced by Stuart Price. Like its predecessors, Hotspot reached number three in the UK.

The compilation album Smash: The Singles 1985–2020 was released by Parlophone in 2023 and entered the UK charts at number four. Pet Shop Boys returned to Parlophone in 2024 for their fifteenth album Nonetheless, produced by James Ford. Debuting at number two in the UK, Nonetheless was their highest-charting studio album since Very 31 years earlier and their nineteenth album overall to reach the top ten.

== Albums ==
=== Studio albums ===
List of studio albums, with selected chart positions and certifications
Title	Details	Peak chart positions										Certifications
Title	Details	UK	AUS	AUT	CAN	FIN	GER	NLD	SWE	SWI	US	Certifications
Please	Released: 24 March 1986; Label: Parlophone; Formats: CD, LP, cassette	3	10	—	3	4	38	—	21	20	7	BPI: Platinum; MC: Platinum; RIAA: Platinum
Actually	Released: 7 September 1987; Label: Parlophone; Formats: CD, LP, cassette	2	16	5	16	1	2	5	2	3	25	BPI: 3× Platinum; BVMI: Platinum; GLF: Gold; IFPI AUT: Gold; IFPI FIN: Platinum; IFPI SWI: Platinum; MC: Platinum; RIAA: Gold
Introspective	Released: 10 October 1988; Label: Parlophone; Formats: CD, LP, cassette, DCC	2	44	8	11	1	2	—	5	2	34	BPI: 2× Platinum; BVMI: Gold; GLF: Gold; IFPI FIN: Gold; IFPI SWI: Gold; MC: Platinum; RIAA: Gold
Behaviour	Released: 22 October 1990; Label: Parlophone; Formats: CD, LP, cassette	2	27	22	34	3	4	51	9	12	45	BPI: Platinum; BVMI: Gold; GLF: Gold; IFPI FIN: Gold; IFPI SWI: Gold; MC: Gold
Very	Released: 27 September 1993; Label: Parlophone; Formats: CD, LP, cassette	1	2	6	9	1	1	18	1	1	20	BPI: Platinum; ARIA: Platinum; BVMI: Platinum; GLF: Gold; IFPI AUT: Gold; IFPI FIN: Gold; IFPI SWI: Platinum; MC: Platinum; RIAA: Gold; SNEP: Gold
Bilingual	Released: 2 September 1996; Label: Parlophone; Formats: CD, LP, cassette	4	3	15	18	14	7	59	4	11	39	BPI: Gold
Nightlife	Released: 11 October 1999; Label: Parlophone; Formats: CD, LP, cassette, MD	7	25	16	11	18	2	61	4	9	84	BPI: Gold; BVMI: Gold
Release	Released: 1 April 2002; Label: Parlophone; Formats: CD, LP, cassette	7	62	15	—	22	3	71	12	13	73	BPI: Silver
Fundamental	Released: 22 May 2006; Label: Parlophone; Formats: CD, LP, digital download	5	25	23	—	9	4	42	6	7	150	BPI: Silver
Yes	Released: 23 March 2009; Label: Parlophone; Formats: CD, LP, digital download	4	32	5	—	28	3	34	12	7	32	BPI: Silver; BVMI: Gold
Elysium	Released: 10 September 2012; Label: Parlophone; Formats: CD, LP, digital download	9	50	20	—	21	7	28	12	13	44	
Electric	Released: 15 July 2013; Label: x2; Formats: CD, LP, digital download	3	24	13	21	5	3	15	11	6	26	
Super	Released: 1 April 2016; Label: x2; Formats: CD, LP, digital download	3	12	8	35	8	3	13	10	4	58	
Hotspot	Released: 24 January 2020; Label: x2; Formats: CD, LP, cassette, digital download	3	8	7	61	23	3	30	15	6	100	
Nonetheless	Released: 26 April 2024; Label: x2, Parlophone; Formats: CD, LP, cassette, digital download, Blu-ray	2	3	3	—	20	3	16	39	2	—	

=== Live albums ===
List of live albums, with selected chart positions
Title	Details	Peak chart positions				
Title	Details	UK	AUT	GER	SWE	SWI
Concrete	Performed: 8 May 2006, Mermaid Theater, with BBC Concert Orchestra; Released: 23 October 2006; Label: Parlophone; Formats: CD, digital download	61	—	76	—	—
Pandemonium	Performed: 21 December 2009, The O2 Arena, London; Released: 15 February 2010; Label: Parlophone; Formats: CD, digital download	29	75	22	41	87
Inner Sanctum	Performed 27/28 July 2018, Royal Opera House, London; Released: 12 April 2019; Label: x2; Formats: CD, digital download	— (Note: Inner Sanctum did not chart on the UK Albums Chart, but peaked at number one on the UK Music Video Chart.)	—	11	—	84
Discovery: Live in Rio 1994	Performed: December 1994, Rio de Janeiro Brazil; Released: 30 April 2021; Label: Parlophone; Formats: CD, digital download, DVD/2CD, VHS	31	—	42	—	—
Dreamworld – The Greatest Hits Live	Released: 27 February 2026; Label: Parlophone; Formats: CD, digital download, Blu-ray/CD	—	39	8	—	17
"—" denotes a recording that did not chart or was not released in that territory.

=== Compilation albums ===
List of compilation albums, with selected chart positions and certifications
Title	Details	Peak chart positions										Certifications
Title	Details	UK	AUS	AUT	CAN	FIN	GER	NLD	SWE	SWI	US	Certifications
Discography: The Complete Singles Collection	Released: 4 November 1991; Label: Parlophone; Formats: CD, LP, cassette, MD	3	6	33	33	4	8	26	14	27	111	BPI: 2× Platinum; ARIA: 2× Platinum; BVMI: Gold; GLF: Gold; IFPI FIN: Gold; MC: 3× Platinum; RIAA: Gold; SNEP: Gold
Alternative	Released: 7 August 1995; Label: Parlophone; Formats: CD, LP, cassette	2	8	33	29	17	28	27	14	19	103	BPI: Silver
Essential	Released: 31 March 1998; Label: EMI; Formats: CD, LP, cassette	—	—	—	—	—	—	—	—	—	—	
Mini	Released: 23 February 2000 (Japan only); Label: EMI; Formats: CD	—	—	—	—	—	—	—	—	—	—	
PopArt: The Hits	Released: 24 November 2003; Label: Parlophone; Formats: CD, LP, cassette	18	193	—	—	—	24	—	20	99	—	BPI: Platinum; BVMI: Gold
Party	Released: 5 November 2009 (Brazil only); Label: Som Livre; Formats: CD, digital download	—	—	—	—	—	—	—	—	—	—	
Ultimate	Released: 1 November 2010; Label: Parlophone; Formats: CD, digital download	27	—	—	—	—	35	—	46	73	—	BPI: Gold
Format	Release: 6 February 2012; Label: Parlophone; Formats: CD, digital download	26	—	73	—	—	31	82	33	52	—	
Smash: The Singles 1985–2020	Released: 16 June 2023; Label: Parlophone; Formats: 3×CD, 6×LP, cassette, digital download	4	—	48	—	—	5	38	—	17	—	BPI: Gold
"—" denotes a recording that did not chart or was not released in that territory.

=== Remix albums ===
List of remix albums, with selected chart positions and certifications
Title	Details	Peak chart positions										Certifications
Title	Details	UK	AUS	AUT	CAN	FIN	GER	NLD	SWE	SWI	US	Certifications
Disco	Released: 17 November 1986; Label: Parlophone; Formats: CD, LP, cassette	15	—	17	83	—	10	16	33	18	95	BPI: Platinum; BVMI: Gold
Disco 2	Released: 12 September 1994; Label: Parlophone; Formats: CD, LP, cassette	6	181	35	—	15	47	54	21	33	75	
Disco 3	Released: 3 February 2003; Label: Parlophone; Formats: CD, LP	36	153	—	—	—	33	—	43	—	188	
Disco 4	Released: 8 October 2007; Label: Parlophone; Formats: CD, LP	— (Note: Disco 4 did not enter the UK Albums Chart, but peaked at number 15 on the UK Compilation Albums Chart.)	—	—	—	—	—	—	—	—	—	
Disco 5	Released: 21 November 2025; Label: Parlophone; Formats: CD, LP, digital download	—	—	—	—	—	—	—	—	36	—	
"—" denotes a recording that did not chart or was not released in that territory.

=== Soundtrack albums ===
List of soundtrack albums, with selected chart positions
Title	Details	Peak chart positions						
Title	Details	UK	AUS	AUT	GER	NLD	SWE	SWI
Closer to Heaven	Released: 8 October 2001; Label: Sony; Formats: CD, LP	107	—	—	—	—	—	—
Battleship Potemkin	Released: 5 September 2005; Label: Parlophone; Formats: CD, LP, digital download	97	—	—	54	—	—	—
The Most Incredible Thing	Released: 14 March 2011; Label: Parlophone; Formats: CD, LP, digital download	57	—	—	36	61	45	—
Musik	Released: 6 August 2019; Label: x2; Format: Digital download	—	—	—	—	—	—	—
My Beautiful Laundrette (Note: The soundtrack album was initially released as a limited-edition CD single exclusively available through the Pet Shop Boys website with a wider release to streaming platforms and downloads in May 2021.)	Released: 17 April 2020; Label: x2; Format: CD, digital download	—	—	—	—	—	—	—
A Man from the Future	Released: 9 October 2026; Label: x2, Parlophone; Formats: CD, LP, digital download, Blu-ray	19	22	21	8	85	—	12
"—" denotes a recording that did not chart or was not released in that territory.

== Extended plays ==
List of extended plays, with selected chart positions
Title	Details	Peak chart positions		
Title	Details	UK	FRA	GER
In Depth	Released: 5 July 1989; Label: Parlophone; Formats: CD, LP, cassette; Note: 6-track EP (Japan only)	—	—	—
Christmas	Released: 14 December 2009; Label: Parlophone; Formats: CD, digital download	40	60	35
Agenda	Released: 8 February 2019; Label: x2, Kobalt Label Services; Formats: CD, LP, digital download, streaming	—	—	—
Lost	Released: 14 April 2023; Label: x2, AWAL; Formats: CD, digital download, streaming	—	—	—
Furthermore	Released: 17 May 2024; Label: Parlophone; Formats: Digital download, streaming	—	—	—
"—" denotes a recording that did not chart or was not released in that territory.

== Singles ==
=== 1980s ===
List of singles, with selected chart positions and certifications, showing year released and album name
Title	Year	Peak chart positions											Certifications	Album
Title	Year	UK	AUS	AUT	CAN	GER	IRE	NLD	SWE	SWI	US	US Dance	Certifications	Album
"West End Girls" (original recording)	1984	133	—	—	81	—	—	—	—	—	—	—		Non-album singles
"One More Chance"	1984	—	—	—	—	—	—	—	—	—	—	—		Non-album singles
"Opportunities (Let's Make Lots of Money)" (original mix)	1985	116	63	—	—	—	—	—	—	—	—	—		Non-album singles
"West End Girls" (re-recording)	1985	1	5	5	1	2	2	3	2	2	1	1	BPI: Platinum; MC: Gold	Please
"Love Comes Quickly"	1986	19	54	—	74	17	13	—	—	24	62	10		Please
"Opportunities (Let's Make Lots of Money)" (remix)	1986	11	—	—	22	25	14	23	—	—	10	3		Please
"Suburbia"	1986	8	—	9	—	2	3	2	6	3	70	46		Please
"Paninaro"	1986	—	—	—	—	—	—	—	—	—	—	—		Disco
"It's a Sin"	1987	1	10	1	8	1	1	3	1	1	9	3	BPI: Platinum; GLF: Platinum; IFPI AUT: Gold; IFPI FIN: Gold	Actually
"What Have I Done to Deserve This?" (with Dusty Springfield)	1987	2	22	11	3	4	1	2	2	5	2	1	BPI: Silver; GLF: Gold	Actually
"Rent"	1987	8	81	27	—	10	5	25	19	10	—	—		Actually
"Always on My Mind"	1987	1	10	2	1	1	2	3	1	1	4	8	BPI: Platinum; MC: Gold; BVMI: Gold	Non-album single
"Heart"	1988	1	18	3	—	1	1	11	9	1	—	—	BPI: Silver	Actually
"Domino Dancing"	1988	7	36	19	17	3	4	7	6	5	18	5		Introspective
"Left to My Own Devices"	1988	4	48	—	85	9	3	18	—	12	84	8		Introspective
"It's Alright"	1989	5	70	27	—	3	2	41	—	15	—	—		Introspective
"—" denotes a recording that did not chart or was not released in that territory.

=== 1990s ===
Title	Year	Peak chart positions											Certifications	Album
Title	Year	UK	AUS	AUT	CAN	GER	IRE	NLD	SWE	SWI	US	US Dance	Certifications	Album
"So Hard"	1990	4	27	14	76	3	3	11	3	2	62	4		Behaviour
"Being Boring"	1990	20	82	30	90	13	17	66	16	16	—	—		Behaviour
"How Can You Expect to Be Taken Seriously?"	1991	4	9	—	—	—	2	14	—	—	93	19		Behaviour
"Where the Streets Have No Name (I Can't Take My Eyes Off You)"	1991	4	9	5	—	7	2	14	13	3	72	4		Non-album single
"Jealousy"	1991	12	147	—	—	20	8	—	—	14	—	—		Behaviour
"DJ Culture"	1991	13	130	—	—	19	7	—	17	21	—	—		Discography
"Was It Worth It?"	1991	24	153	—	—	19	25	50	23	—	—	—		Discography
"Can You Forgive Her?"	1993	7	17	18	37	17	13	29	9	19	— (Note: "Can You Forgive Her?" did not enter the Billboard Hot 100, but peaked at number nine on the Billboard Bubbling Under Hot 100 Singles chart.)	1		Very
"Go West"	1993	2	10	2	19	1	1	5	2	2	— (Note: "Go West" did not enter the Billboard Hot 100, but peaked at number six on the Billboard Bubbling Under Hot 100 Singles chart.)	1	ARIA: Gold; BVMI: Platinum; IFPI AUT: Gold; BPI: Silver	Very
"I Wouldn't Normally Do This Kind of Thing"	1993	13	34	18	61	37	20	45	38	26	—	2		Very
"Liberation"	1994	14	63	—	—	51	22	—	—	—	—	—		Very
"Absolutely Fabulous"	1994	6	2	—	—	—	18	—	36	—	—	7	ARIA: Gold	Non-album single
"Yesterday, When I Was Mad"	1994	13	13	—	—	72	—	28	—	—	—	4		Very
"Paninaro '95"	1995	15	30	—	—	39	25	37	24	—	—	4		Non-album single
"Before"	1996	7	25	38	79	45	—	—	10	31	— (Note: "Before" did not enter the Billboard Hot 100, but peaked at number seven on the Billboard Bubbling Under Hot 100 Singles chart.)	1		Bilingual
"Se a vida é (That's the Way Life Is)"	1996	8	11	14	—	18	—	—	12	17	—	—		Bilingual
"To Step Aside"	1996	—	—	—	—	—	—	—	—	—	—	1		Bilingual
"Single-Bilingual"	1996	14	—	—	—	77	—	—	39	—	—	—		Bilingual
"A Red Letter Day"	1997	9	57	—	—	55	—	—	30	—	— (Note: "Somewhere" did not enter the Billboard Hot 100, but peaked at number 25 on the Billboard Bubbling Under Hot 100 Singles chart.)	—		Bilingual
"Somewhere"	1997	9	56	—	—	70	—	—	21	—	—	19		Non-album single
"I Don't Know What You Want but I Can't Give It Any More"	1999	15	67	37	14	23	—	64	26	28	— (Note: "I Don't Know What You Want but I Can't Give It Any More" did not enter the Billboard Hot 100, but peaked at number 66 on the Billboard Hot Singles Sales chart.)	2		Nightlife
"New York City Boy"	1999	14	174	40	—	16	—	40	9	20	— (Note: "New York City Boy" did not enter the Billboard Hot 100, but peaked at number 53 on the Billboard Hot Singles Sales chart.)	1		Nightlife
"—" denotes a recording that did not chart or was not released in that territory.

=== 2000s ===
Title	Year	Peak chart positions										Album
Title	Year	UK	AUS	AUT	CAN	GER	IRE	SWE	SWI	US Sales	US Dance	Album
"You Only Tell Me You Love Me When You're Drunk"	2000	8	—	—	—	29	38	45	74	—	—	Nightlife
"Home and Dry"	2002	14	—	47	17	12	33	44	37	—	44	Release
"I Get Along"	2002	18	—	—	25	31	47	—	—	—	—	Release
"London"	2002	118	—	—	—	39	—	—	—	—	—	Release
"Miracles"	2003	10	76	—	—	20	—	34	97	—	—	PopArt
"Flamboyant"	2004	12	—	—	—	43	33	43	—	—	—	PopArt
"I'm with Stupid"	2006	8	23	—	—	29	23	10	38	—	7	Fundamental
"Minimal"	2006	19	—	—	—	63	—	—	—	—	3	Fundamental
"Numb"	2006	23	—	—	—	72	47	—	—	—	—	Fundamental
"Integral"	2007	197	—	—	—	—	—	—	—	—	—	Disco 4
"Love Etc."	2009	14	150	21	—	12	31	60	19	2	1	Yes
"Did You See Me Coming?"	2009	21	—	—	—	49	—	—	—	—	1	Yes
"Beautiful People"	2009	— (Note: "Beautiful People" did not enter the UK Singles Chart, but peaked at number 9 on the UK Physical Singles Chart.)	—	—	—	65	—	—	—	—	—	Yes
"It Doesn't Often Snow at Christmas" (New Version) (released on the single E.P. Christmas)	2009	40	—	—	—	35	—	10	—	—	—	Non-album single
"—" denotes a recording that did not chart or was not released in that territory.

=== 2010s ===
Title	Year	Peak chart positions								Album
Title	Year	UK	AUS	FRA	GER	IRE	US Sales	US Dance	US Dance Elec.	Album
"Love Life" (Note: "Love Life" was released in the United Kingdom as a limited-edition seven-inch vinyl single for Record Store Day.)	2010	— (Note: "Love Life" did not enter the UK Singles Chart, but peaked at number 26 on the UK Physical Singles Chart.)	—	—	—	—	—	—	—	Non-album single
"Together"	2010	58	—	—	60	—	20	—	—	Ultimate
"Winner"	2012	86	—	—	60	—	17	12	—	Elysium
"Leaving"	2012	44	—	139	35	77	—	10	—	Elysium
"Memory of the Future"	2012	111	—	—	68	—	2	—	—	Elysium
"Axis"	2013	196	194	—	—	—	—	—	—	Electric
"Vocal"	2013	— (Note: "Vocal" was ineligible to chart in the United Kingdom.)	—	196	—	—	20	3	36	Electric
"Love Is a Bourgeois Construct"	2013	105	—	—	—	—	4	38	—	Electric
"Thursday" (featuring Example)	2013	61	—	—	—	—	—	17	36	Electric
"Fluorescent" (Note: "Fluorescent" was released in the United Kingdom as a limited-edition 12-inch vinyl single for Record Store Day.)	2014	— (Note: "Fluorescent" did not enter the UK Singles Chart, but peaked at number 19 on the UK Physical Singles Chart.)	—	—	—	—	—	—	—	Electric
"The Pop Kids"	2016	128	—	138	—	—	1	1	21	Super
"Twenty-Something"	2016	— (Note: "Twenty-Something" did not enter the UK Singles Chart, but peaked at number 1 on the UK Physical Singles Chart, at number 46 on the Independent Singles Chart, and at number 80 on the UK Singles Sales Chart.)	—	—	—	—	4	—	—	Super
"Inner Sanctum"	2016	— (Note: "Inner Sanctum" did not enter the UK Singles Chart, but debuted and peaked at number 2 on the UK Physical Singles Chart and UK Vinyl Singles Chart.)	—	—	—	—	—	—	—	Super
"Say It to Me"	2016	— (Note: "Say It to Me" did not enter the UK Singles Chart, but peaked at number 1 on the UK Physical Singles Chart and UK Vinyl Singles Chart, at number 40 on the UK Independent Singles Chart, at number 49 on the UK Singles Sales Chart and at number 86 on the UK Singles Downloads Chart.)	—	115	—	—	5	4	35	Super
"Undertow"	2017	— (Note: "Undertow" did not enter the UK Singles Chart, but peaked at number 13 on the UK Vinyl Singles Chart, at number 14 on the UK Physical Singles Chart and at number 87 on the UK Singles Sales Chart.)	—	—	—	—	—	—	—	Super
"Dreamland" (featuring Years & Years)	2019	— (Note: "Dreamland" did not enter the UK Singles Chart, but peaked at number 26 on the UK Singles Downloads Chart.)	—	—	—	—	—	6	21	Hotspot
"Burning the Heather"	2019	— (Note: "Burning the Heather" did not enter the UK Singles Chart, but peaked at number 2 on the UK Vinyl Singles Chart, at number 3 on the UK Physical Singles Chart and at number 34 on the UK Singles Sales Chart.)	—	—	—	—	—	—	—	Hotspot
"—" denotes a recording that did not chart or was not released in that territory.

=== 2020s ===
Title	Year	Peak chart positions								Album
Title	Year	UK	AUS	FRA	GER	IRE	US Sales	US Dance	US Dance Elec.	Album
"Monkey Business"	2020	— (Note: "Monkey Business" did not enter the UK Singles Chart, but peaked at number 1 on the UK Physical Singles Chart and UK Vinyl Singles Chart, at number 6 on the UK Singles Sales Chart, at number 40 on the UK Singles Downloads Chart and at number 47 on the UK Independent Singles Chart.)	—	—	—	—	—	—	28	Hotspot
"I Don't Wanna"	2020	— (Note: "I Don't Wanna" did not enter the UK Singles Chart, but peaked at number 1 on the UK Physical Singles Chart and UK Vinyl Singles Chart, at number 10 on the UK Singles Sales Chart and at number 61 on the UK Singles Downloads Chart.)	—	—	—	—	—	—	38	Hotspot
"Cricket Wife" (Note: "Cricket Wife" was released as a limited-edition CD single exclusively available through the Pet Shop Boys website.)	2021	— (Note: "Cricket Wife" did not enter the UK Singles Chart, but peaked at number 70 on the UK Singles Downloads Chart and at number 72 on the UK Singles Sales Chart.)	—	—	—	—	—	—	—	Non-album single
"Loneliness"	2024	— (Note: "Loneliness" did not enter the UK Singles Chart Top 100 but debuted and peaked at number 23 on the UK Singles Downloads Chart Top 100.)	—	—	—	—	—	—	—	Nonetheless
"Dancing Star"	2024	— (Note: "Dancing Star" did not enter the UK Singles Chart Top 100 but debuted and peaked at number 34 on the UK Singles Downloads Chart Top 100.)	—	—	—	—	—	—	—	Nonetheless
"A New Bohemia"	2024	— (Note: "A New Bohemia" did not enter the UK Singles Chart, but debuted and peaked at number 3 on the UK Singles Sales Chart and at number 36 on the UK Singles Downloads Chart.)	—	—	—	—	—	—	—	Nonetheless
"Feel"	2024	— (Note: "Feel" did not enter the UK Singles Chart, but debuted at number 44 on the UK Singles Downloads Chart on 23 August 2024.)	—	—	—	—	—	—	—	Nonetheless
"New London Boy"/ "All the Young Dudes"	2024	— (Note: "New London Boy" did not enter the UK Singles chart, but peaked at number 1 on the UK Physical Singles chart, at number 5 on the UK Singles Sales chart and at number 25 on the UK Singles Downloads chart.)	—	—	—	—	—	—	—	Nonetheless
"New London Boy"/ "All the Young Dudes"	2024	— (Note: "All the Young Dudes" did not enter the UK Singles chart, but peaked at number 4 on the UK Physical Singles chart and UK Singles Sales chart and at number 37 on the UK Singles Downloads chart.)	—	—	—	—	—	—	—	Nonetheless
"Hymn (In memoriam Alexei Navalny)"	2025	— (Note: "Hymn (In memoriam Alexei Navalny)" did not enter the UK Singles Chart, but debuted and peaked at number 2 on the UK Vinyl Singles Chart, at number 3 on the UK Physical Singles Chart and at number 69 on the UK Singles Sales Chart on 21 August 2025.)	—	—	—	—	—	—	—	Non-album single
"—" denotes a recording that did not chart or was not released in that territory.

=== As featured artist ===
Title	Year	Peak chart positions								Album
Title	Year	UK	AUS	GER	IRE	NLD	SWE	SWI	US Dance	Album
"Hallo Spaceboy" (remix; David Bowie featuring Pet Shop Boys)	1996	12	36	59	21	24	—	—	—	Outside
"Break 4 Love" (as "Peter Rauhofer + Pet Shop Boys = The Collaboration")	2001	—	—	—	—	—	—	—	1	Non-album single
"She's Madonna" (Robbie Williams featuring Pet Shop Boys)	2007	16	—	4	38	2	20	8	12	Rudebox
"We're the Pet Shop Boys" (Robbie Williams featuring Pet Shop Boys)	2008	—	—	—	—	—	—	—	5	Rudebox
"I'm in Love with a German Film Star" (as Sam Taylor-Wood Produced By Pet Shop Boys)	2008	—	—	—	—	—	—	—	—	Non-album single
"Purple Zone" (Soft Cell and Pet Shop Boys)	2022	— (Note: "Purple Zone" did not enter the UK Singles Chart, but peaked at number 1 on the UK Physical Singles Chart and UK Vinyl Singles Chart, at number 9 on the UK Singles Sales Chart and at number 11 on the UK Singles Downloads Chart.)	—	—	—	—	—	—	—	Happiness Not Included
"—" denotes a recording that did not chart or was not released in that territory.

=== Promotional singles ===
List of promotional singles, with selected chart positions, showing year released and album name
Title	Year	Peaks		Album
Title	Year	UK	US Dance	Album
"In the Night"	1987	—	—	Disco
"Music for Boys"	1991	—	—	Non-album promotional singles
"The Truck-Driver and His Mate"	1996	—	—	Non-album promotional singles
"It Always Comes as a Surprise"	1996	—	—	Bilingual
"The Boy Who Couldn't Keep His Clothes On"	1997	—	—	Non-album promotional singles
"It Doesn't Often Snow at Christmas" (original recording)	1997	—	—	Non-album promotional singles
"Sexy Northerner"	2003	—	15	Disco 3
"Paris City Boy"	2004	—	—	PopArt
"Psychological"	2005	—	—	Fundamental
"In Private"	2006	—	—	Fundamental
"Try It (I'm in Love with a Married Man)"	2006	—	—	Non-album promotional single
"King of Rome"	2009	—	—	Yes
"All Over the World"	2009	—	—	Christmas (EP)
"—" denotes a recording that did not chart or was not released in that territory.

== Other charted songs ==
Title	Year	Peak chart positions	
Title	Year	SWE	US Dance/Electronic Digital
"Viva la Vida/Domino Dancing"	2009	32	—
"Decide"	2019	—	25
"—" denotes a recording that did not chart or was not released in that territory.

== Videography ==
=== Video albums ===
Title	Details	Notes
Television	Released: 1986; Label: Picture Music International; Formats: VHS, Betamax, CDV, LaserDisc, VHD	Compilation of music videos from the Please album.
Showbusiness	Released: 1988; Label: Picture Music International; Format: VHS	Compilation of music videos from the Actually album.
Highlights: Pet Shop Boys on Tour	Released: 3 December 1990; Label: Picture Music International; Formats: VHS, LaserDisc	Recorded live at Wembley Arena in London in June 1989.
Promotion	Released: 3 June 1991; Label: Picture Music International; Formats: VHS, LaserDisc	Compilation of music videos from 1988 to 1991
Videography: The Singles Collection on Video	Released: 4 November 1991; Label: EMI Video; Formats: VHS, LaserDisc, VCD	Compilation of music videos from 1985 to 1991.
Performance	Released: 1 June 1992; Label: Picture Music International; Formats: VHS, LaserDisc	Recorded live at the Birmingham NEC in June 1991 on the duo's Performance Tour.; Released on DVD in 2004 with concert commentary and interview with the duo.
Projections	Released: 29 November 1993; Label: Artificial Eye; Format: VHS	Film projections used during tours; devised by Derek Jarman.
Various	Released: 6 March 1995; Label: Picture Music International; Formats: VHS, LaserDisc	Compilation of music videos from the Very album.
Discovery: Live in Rio	Released: 7 August 1995; Label: Picture Music International; Formats: VHS, LaserDisc	Recorded live in Rio de Janeiro on the duo's Discovery Tour.
Somewhere: Pet Shop Boys in Concert	Released: 12 October 1997; Label: Game Entertainment Group; Formats: DVD, VHS, VCD	Recorded live at the Savoy Theatre in London in June 1997.; Also includes a documentary showing the buildup to the show and rehearsals.
Montage: The Nightlife Tour	Released: 5 November 2001; Label: Parlophone; Formats: DVD, VHS, VCD	Recorded live at various concert venues in Dortmund, Germany on their 1999–2000 Nightlife Tour
PopArt: The Videos	Released: 10 November 2003; Label: Parlophone; Format: DVD	Compilation of music videos from 1984 to 2003.; Certified Gold in the UK.; Certified Gold in Germany.
A Life in Pop	Released: 30 October 2006; Label: Parlophone; Format: DVD	90-minute documentary, originally broadcast on Channel 4, and music videos from 2003 to 2006.; Also features interviews about the duo with Robbie Williams, Jake Shears and Bruce Weber.
Cubism	Released: 21 May 2007; Label: Warner Vision; Format: DVD	Recorded live at Auditorio Nacional in Mexico City on 14 November 2006 on the duo's Fundamental Tour.
Pandemonium	Released: 15 February 2010; Label: Parlophone; Format: DVD	Recorded live at The O2 Arena in London on 21 December 2009 on the duo's Pandemonium Tour.
Inner Sanctum	Released: 12 April 2019; Label: x2; Formats: DVD, Blu-ray	Recorded live at the Royal Opera House in London on 27–28 July 2018 on the duo's Super Tour.
Dreamworld – The Greatest Hits Live	Released: 27 February 2026; Label: Parlophone; Formats: Blu-ray	Recorded live at the Royal Arena in Copenhagen on 7 July 2023 on the duo's Dreamworld: The Greatest Hits Live.

=== Music videos ===
List of music videos, showing year released and directors
Title	Year	Director
"Opportunities (Let's Make Lots of Money)" (first version)	1985	Eric Watson and Andy Morahan
"West End Girls"	1985	Eric Watson and Andy Morahan
"Love Comes Quickly"	1986	Eric Watson and Andy Morahan
"Opportunities (Let's Make Lots of Money)" (second version)	1986	Zbigniew Rybczyński
"Suburbia"	1986	Eric Watson
"Paninaro"	1986	Neil Tennant and Chris Lowe
"It's a Sin"	1987	Derek Jarman
"What Have I Done to Deserve This?" (with Dusty Springfield)	1987	Eric Watson
"Rent"	1987	Derek Jarman
"Always on My Mind"	1987	Jack Bond
"Heart"	1988	Jack Bond
"Domino Dancing"	1988	Eric Watson
"Left to My Own Devices"	1988	Eric Watson
"It's Alright"	1989	Eric Watson
"So Hard"	1990	Eric Watson
"Being Boring"	1990	Bruce Weber
"How Can You Expect to Be Taken Seriously?"	1991	Liam Kan
"Where the Streets Have No Name (I Can't Take My Eyes Off You)"	1991	Liam Kan
"Jealousy"	1991	Eric Watson
"DJ Culture"	1991	Eric Watson
"Was It Worth It?"	1991	Eric Watson
"Can You Forgive Her?"	1993	Howard Greenhalgh
"Go West"	1993	Howard Greenhalgh
"I Wouldn't Normally Do This Kind of Thing"	1993	Howard Greenhalgh
"Liberation"	1994	Howard Greenhalgh
"Yesterday, When I Was Mad"	1994	Howard Greenhalgh
"Paninaro '95"	1995	Howard Greenhalgh
"Before"	1996	Howard Greenhalgh
"Se a vida é (That's the Way Life Is)"	1996	Bruce Weber
"Single-Bilingual"	1996	Howard Greenhalgh
"A Red Letter Day"	1997	Howard Greenhalgh
"Somewhere"	1997	Annie Griffin
"I Don't Know What You Want but I Can't Give It Any More"	1999	Pedro Romhanyi
"New York City Boy"	1999	Howard Greenhalgh
"You Only Tell Me You Love Me When You're Drunk"	2000	Pedro Romhanyi
"Home and Dry"	2002	Wolfgang Tillmans
"I Get Along/E-Mail"	2002	Bruce Weber
"London"	2002	Martin Parr
"Miracles"	2003	Howard Greenhalgh
"Flamboyant"	2004	Nico Beyer
"I'm with Stupid"	2006	Rob Leggatt
"Minimal"	2006	Don Cameron
"Numb"	2006	Julian Gibbs, Julian House and Chris Sayer
"Integral"	2007	Tom Roope
"Love Etc."	2009	Hoogerbrugge
"Did You See Me Coming?"	2009	Douglas Hart
"All Over the World"	2009	Blue Leach
"Together"	2010	Peeter Rebane
"Invisible"	2012	Brian Bress
"Winner"	2012	Surrender Monkeys
"Leaving"	2012	David Lopez-Edwards
"Axis"	2013	Luke Halls and Jude Greenaway
"Vocal"	2013	Joost Vandeburg
"Thursday" (featuring Example)	2013	Justyn Field
"Twenty-something"	2016	Gavin Filipiak
"Monkey Business"	2020	Vaughan Arnell
"West End Girls (New Lockdown Version)"	2020	Pet Shop Boys with Luke Halls
"Purple Zone" (with Soft Cell)	2022	Yassa Khan
"The Lost Room" (featuring clips from Young Törless)	2023	Volker Schlöndorff (source material); edited by Chris Lowe and Gary Stillwell
"Loneliness"	2024	Alasdair McLellan
"Dancing Star"	2024	Luke Halls
"A New Bohemia"	2024	Andrew Haigh
"Feel"	2024	Corbin Shaw & Rawtape
"Schlager-Hitparade (Deutsches Demo)"	2024	Pet Shop Boys
"All the Young Dudes"	2024	Slava Mogutin

== Other appearances ==
List of other appearances, with selected chart positions
Title	Details	Peak chart positions				
Title	Details	UK	AUS	GER	NLD	SWE
The Crying Game	Released: 23 February 1993; Label: Spaghetti; Formats: CD, LP, cassette; Note: Production credits for Boy George cover of "The Crying Game", "Live for Today" performed by Cicero, and "Let the Music Play" by Carroll Thompson.	—	—	—	—	—
"—" denotes a recording that did not chart or was not released in that territory.
