= Smash: The Singles 1985–2020 =

Compilation album by Pet Shop Boys
- Released: 16 June 2023
- Length: 218:51
- Label: Parlophone

Pet Shop Boys chronology
Lost (2023)	Smash: The Singles 1985–2020 (2023)	Nonetheless (2024)

Smash: The Singles 1985–2020 is a compilation album by English synth-pop duo Pet Shop Boys, released on 16 June 2023 through Parlophone. It includes 55 tracks, comprising most of the duo's singles from 1985 to 2020 in chronological order, across three discs or six LPs. A compilation of the duo's videos on Blu-ray was also released alongside the album. The duo supported the album with the Dreamworld: The Greatest Hits Live tour, with dates in the UK and Europe from May to July 2023.

== Background ==
Neil Tennant and Chris Lowe said in a statement that "As we start work on a new album, and later this year continue our 'Dreamworld' Greatest Hits Tour, it seems like a good time to take stock and bring together every single we've released."

Every track included on the compilation was officially released as a single by the duo, and nearly every version is either the 7-inch or CD version that was serviced to British radio. The exception to this rule is "New York City Boy", which instead has its US radio edit included. Alongside the album announcement, they explained:

In recent years the idea of a "single" has become slightly vague with tracks services to radio and online but not physically released. The singles compiled on Smash (from "Suburbia" onwards) were all officially released on CD in the UK. Where there is a double A-side single or an EP, only the lead track which got radio plays has been included.

The singles not included on Smash because they do not fit the criteria above include:

- The original version of "West End Girls", the group's debut single, produced by Bobby 'O' Orlando. Released in 1984.
- "One More Chance", the group's second single, again produced by Bobby 'O'. Released in 1984.
- "How Can You Expect to Be Taken Seriously?", which was part of a double A-side in 1991 alongside "Where the Streets Have No Name (I Can't Take My Eyes Off You)". Pitchfork claims that, when asked about the song, Lowe noted that it "doesn't sound like a single".
- "Absolutely Fabulous", a 1994 Comic Relief single in collaboration with the titular television show which was released under the artist name Absolutely Fabulous.
- "London", the 2002 third single from the album Release, which was not released in the UK.
- "Beautiful People", the 2009 third single from the album Yes, which was not released in the UK.
- "Burning the Heather", which was released on 7-inch vinyl only in 2020.

== Critical reception ==
Professional ratings
Aggregate scores
Source	Rating
Metacritic	95/100
Review scores
Source	Rating
AllMusic	4.5/5 stars
Pitchfork	8.4/10
Record Collector	4/5 stars

Smash: The Singles 1985–2020 received a score of 95 out of 100 on review aggregator Metacritic based on five critics' reviews, indicating "universal acclaim". Uncut felt that the album "demonstrates that PSB are without peer as exponents of the pop single", while Mojo stated that it "re-contextualises them as an act who wrecked glorious havoc on their unchanging musical parameters for decades". Owen Myers of Pitchfork called the compilation "as definitive as it gets, pearl after pearl of fabulous singles from one of the best to ever do it", and although he felt that it "weakens a little in the last of its three discs, [...] there are remarkably few true duds". Timothy Monger of AllMusic wrote that the "wonderfully eclectic body of work they've created as Pet Shop Boys speaks for itself" and "unpacking its 55-song sequence, the first thing one notices is the uniform quality of their songs: elegantly constructed, dense with pop nutrients, undeniably catchy, yet ever so smart". Monger concluded that while "work ethic and quality don't always go hand in hand, [...] Pet Shop Boys have both in spades". Record Collector's Daryl Easlea wrote that it "is with little doubt that the first half of Smash contains some of the greatest pop singles ever released in this country" and "this collection is called Smash for a very good reason".

== Track listing ==
All tracks are written by or co-written by Neil Tennant and Chris Lowe except "Always on My Mind", "It's Alright", "Where the Streets Have No Name (I Can't Take My Eyes Off You)", "Go West", "Somewhere", and "Numb".

Smash: The Singles 1985–2020 disc one track listing
No.	Title	Original album	Length
1.	"West End Girls"	Please (1986)	4:28
2.	"Love Comes Quickly"	Please	3:35
3.	"Opportunities (Let's Make Lots of Money)"	Please	3:38
4.	"Suburbia"	Please	4:04
5.	"It's a Sin"	Actually (1987)	5:01
6.	"What Have I Done to Deserve This?" (with Dusty Springfield)	Actually	4:20
7.	"Rent"	Actually	3:33
8.	"Always on My Mind"	Non-album single	3:54
9.	"Heart"	Actually	4:17
10.	"Domino Dancing"	Introspective (1988)	4:18
11.	"Left to My Own Devices"	Introspective	4:47
12.	"It's Alright"	Introspective	4:20
13.	"So Hard"	Behaviour (1990)	4:00
14.	"Being Boring"	Behaviour	4:51
15.	"Where the Streets Have No Name (I Can't Take My Eyes Off You)"	Non-album single	4:32
16.	"Jealousy"	Behaviour	4:15
17.	"DJ Culture"	Discography: The Complete Singles Collection (1991)	4:14
18.	"Was It Worth It?" (7" version)	Discography: The Complete Singles Collection	4:23
Total length:			76:30

Disc two
No.	Title	Original album	Length
1.	"Can You Forgive Her?"	Very (1993)	3:56
2.	"Go West"	Very	5:04
3.	"I Wouldn't Normally Do This Kind of Thing" (7" version)	Very	4:45
4.	"Liberation"	Very	4:06
5.	"Yesterday, When I Was Mad" (single version)	Very	4:00
6.	"Paninaro '95"	Non-album single	4:10
7.	"Before"	Bilingual (1996)	4:05
8.	"Se a vida é (That's the Way Life Is)"	Bilingual	4:01
9.	"Single-Bilingual"	Bilingual	3:30
10.	"A Red Letter Day"	Bilingual	4:33
11.	"Somewhere"	Non-album single	4:43
12.	"I Don't Know What You Want but I Can't Give It Any More" (radio edit)	Nightlife (1999)	4:29
13.	"New York City Boy" (US radio edit)	Nightlife	3:20
14.	"You Only Tell Me You Love Me When You're Drunk"	Nightlife	3:16
15.	"Home and Dry"	Release (2002)	3:58
16.	"I Get Along" (radio edit)	Release	4:11
17.	"Miracles" (radio edit)	PopArt: The Hits (2003)	3:57
18.	"Flamboyant" (7" mix)	PopArt: The Hits	3:40
Total length:			73:44

Disc three
No.	Title	Original album	Length
1.	"I'm with Stupid"	Fundamental (2006)	3:27
2.	"Minimal" (radio edit)	Fundamental	3:38
3.	"Numb" (single edit)	Fundamental	3:30
4.	"Love Etc."	Yes (2009)	3:32
5.	"Did You See Me Coming?"	Yes	3:44
6.	"It Doesn't Often Snow at Christmas" (new version)	Christmas EP (2009)	3:52
7.	"Together" (Ultimate mix)	Ultimate (2010)	3:30
8.	"Winner"	Elysium (2012)	3:49
9.	"Leaving"	Elysium	3:51
10.	"Memory of the Future" (new single mix)	Elysium	3:36
11.	"Vocal" (radio edit)	Electric (2013)	3:25
12.	"Love Is a Bourgeois Construct" (Nighttime radio edit)	Electric	4:12
13.	"Thursday" (featuring Example; radio edit)	Electric	3:56
14.	"The Pop Kids" (radio edit)	Super (2016)	3:43
15.	"Twenty-Something" (radio edit)	Super	3:41
16.	"Say It to Me" (new radio mix)	Super	3:11
17.	"Dreamland" (featuring Years & Years)	Hotspot (2020)	3:28
18.	"Monkey Business" (radio edit)	Hotspot	3:11
19.	"I Don't Wanna" (radio edit)	Hotspot	3:21
Total length:			68:37

== Charts ==
Chart performance for Smash: The Singles 1985–2020
Chart (2023)	Peak position
Austrian Albums (Ö3 Austria)	48
Belgian Albums (Ultratop Flanders)	21
Belgian Albums (Ultratop Wallonia)	10
Dutch Albums (Album Top 100)	38
German Albums (Offizielle Top 100)	5
Hungarian Albums (MAHASZ)	5
Irish Albums (IRMA)	56
Italian Albums (FIMI)	82
Japanese Hot Albums (Billboard Japan)	94
Portuguese Albums (AFP)	17
Scottish Albums (OCC)	5
Spanish Albums (PROMUSICAE)	7
Swiss Albums (Schweizer Hitparade)	17
UK Albums (OCC)	4
US Top Album Sales (Billboard)	89
US Top Dance Albums (Billboard)	14

== Certifications ==
Certifications for "Smash: The Singles 1985-2020"
Region	Certification	Certified units/sales
United Kingdom (BPI)	Gold	100,000^{‡}
^{‡} Sales+streaming figures based on certification alone.
