= PopArt: The Hits =

Greatest hits album by Pet Shop Boys
- Released: 24 November 2003
- Length: 147:15
- Label: Parlophone
- Producer: Pet Shop Boys

Pet Shop Boys chronology
Disco 3 (2003)	PopArt: The Hits (2003)	Back to Mine: Pet Shop Boys (2005)

Singles from PopArt: The Hits
- 1. "Miracles" Released: 17 November 2003; 2. "Flamboyant" Released: 29 March 2004

PopArt: The Hits is a greatest hits album by the English synth-pop duo Pet Shop Boys. It was released on 24 November 2003 by Parlophone. The album consists of 33 hits from the first 18 years of their career, along with two new tracks, "Miracles" and "Flamboyant", which were released as singles.

== Background and compilation ==
PopArt was the duo's second greatest hits compilation released in the UK, following Discography: The Complete Singles Collection (1991). (Note: Essential (1998) was compiled by EMI for the US market.) The title reflects their work as pop music with artistic influences. The songs were organised in two sections by theme instead of chronologically. The Pop section includes euphoric pop songs, such as "Go West" (1993) and "A Red Letter Day" (1996), while those in the Art section have more complicated narratives, like the autobiographical "Being Boring" (1990).

Four singles from the period were not included on PopArt. "How Can You Expect to Be Taken Seriously?" (1991) had been half of a double A-sided single and was left off in favour of the more popular track, "Where the Streets Have No Name (I Can't Take My Eyes off You)". "Was It Worth It?" (1991) was omitted because it had missed the top 20 on the UK Singles Chart. "Absolutely Fabulous" (1994) was not considered a Pet Shop Boys release; and "London" (2002) was only released in Germany.

The French edition of PopArt included a newly recorded version of "New York City Boy" (1999) called "Paris City Boy", with the chorus sung in French, which had been requested by EMI France to promote the album. On the US edition, the single versions of "Heart" (1988), "I Wouldn't Normally Do This Kind of Thing" (1993), and "Flamboyant" (2004) were used.

== Release ==
PopArt was released as a double album on CD, as well as a limited edition triple LP boxset. There was also a limited edition triple CD boxset, with an additional Mix disc featuring some of the duo's favourite remixes of their songs. A DVD was released at the same time, with 41 music videos arranged chronologically, along with commentary by Neil Tennant, Chris Lowe, and Chris Heath. The album was re-issued on 26 November 2007 in the UK as a box set with the corresponding DVD included.

PopArt reached number 30 on the UK Albums Chart on its original release in 2003. It did not achieve its highest position of 18 until 2009, when Pet Shop Boys received the Brit Award for Outstanding Contribution to Music and performed a medley of their hits at the televised ceremony. At that time, the album re-entered the chart at number 19, advancing to number 18 the following week. It was certified platinum by BPI in 2013, with at least 300,000 copies sold in the UK. In Germany, PopArt was certified gold in 2010 with sales of at least 100,000.

PopArt achieved its best chart position in Norway, peaking at number two in March 2004, following an appearance by Pet Shop Boys to promote the album on the popular Norwegian chat show Først & sist. It entered the chart at number five and rose to the second spot the next week, spending eight weeks in the top 40.

PopArt was finally made available in the United States on 3 October 2006 by Capitol Records. The double album came out on CD, and the Mix tracks were issued as a digital download. The release coincided with the North American leg of the Fundamental Tour.

=== Artwork ===
The album cover (pictured) was designed by Gary Stillwell of Farrow Design. The word "Pop" has orange and white stripes, representing the pointy hats used to promote "Can You Forgive Her?" (1993), and the word "Art" has black and white stripes like the sunglasses worn by Chris Lowe on a cover of "Suburbia" (1986). A montage of photos from the duo's career appeared on the inner sleeves of the vinyl and the concertina CD booklet. The artwork won a D&AD Wood Pencil award.

== Critical reception ==
Professional ratings
Review scores
Source	Rating
AllMusic	4.5/5 stars
The Encyclopedia of Popular Music	5/5 stars
The Guardian	4/5 stars
Pitchfork	8.1/10
Release Magazine	9/10 stars

Several reviewers compared PopArt to its predecessor, Discography. David Jeffries of AllMusic called PopArt, "an excellent, hang-together listen and a better representation of the duo's career than Discography". Nitsuh Abebe of Pitchfork wrote: "The collection certainly doesn't make the Pet Shop Boys look as good as Discography did... At the same time, that makes this collection much more than an update of Discography: It's no longer just a string of pop hits to throw on when people are around, but something you can spend time digging your way through and coming to grips with — less a greatest-hits package, and more a Portable Pet Shop Boys, in something approaching their totality".

Adam Sweeting of The Guardian commented that dividing the album into Pop and Art sections "appears to be purely arbitrary". Likewise, Stephen Dalton of The Times observed in a review of the DVD, "It’s a moot point where the "pop" on PopArt ends and the "art" begins — Tennant and Lowe certainly seem unclear on their audio commentary". He called the music video compilation, "a feast of brainy disco, sly social commentary and homoerotic subtext. Two decades of obliquely mapping trends in fashion, media, music and politics through bittersweet lyrics and opulent electro-pop". Both Dalton and Prasad Bidaye of Exclaim! found the DVD audio commentary by the duo to be primarily focused on their fashions. Bidaye concluded, "It is more fun watching these clips with Tennant playing pop culture critic, but it's unlikely that PopArt will convert first-time viewers. This one's really for the die-hard fans".

== Track listing ==
All tracks are written by Neil Tennant and Chris Lowe, except where noted.

Pop
No.	Title	Writer(s)	Original album	Length
1.	"Go West"	Jacques Morali; Henri Belolo; Victor Willis; Tennant; Lowe	Very (1993)	5:04
2.	"Suburbia" (video mix)		Please (1986)	5:11
3.	"Se a vida é (That's the Way Life Is)"	Ademario; Wellington Epiderme Negra; Nego do Barbalho; Tennant; Lowe	Bilingual (1996)	4:01
4.	"What Have I Done to Deserve This?"	Lowe; Tennant; Allee Willis	Actually (1987)	4:19
5.	"Always on My Mind" (7" version)	Wayne Carson; Johnny Christopher; Mark James	non-album single (1987)	4:01
6.	"I Wouldn't Normally Do This Kind of Thing" (Beatmasters mix)		Very (1993)	4:45 (Note: 4:28 on US release)
7.	"Home and Dry"		Release (2002)	3:58
8.	"Heart" (album version)		Actually (1987)	3:58 (Note: 4:16 on US release)
9.	"Miracles"	Tennant; Lowe; Adam F; Dan Fresh Stein	previously unreleased	3:55
10.	"Love Comes Quickly"	Tennant; Lowe; Stephen Hague	Please (1986)	4:18
11.	"It's a Sin"		Actually (1987)	5:00
12.	"Domino Dancing" (7" version)		Introspective (1988)	4:18
13.	"Before"		Bilingual (1996)	4:06
14.	"New York City Boy" (US radio edit)	Tennant; Lowe; David Morales	Nightlife (1999)	3:21
15.	"It's Alright" (7" version)	Sterling Void; Marshall Jefferson; Paris Brightledge	Introspective (1988)	4:20
16.	"Where the Streets Have No Name (I Can't Take My Eyes off You)" (7" version)	Paul Hewson; David Evans; Larry Mullen; Adam Clayton; Bob Crewe; Bob Gaudio	non-album single (1991)	4:30
17.	"A Red Letter Day" (single version)		Bilingual (1996)	4:34
Total length:				73:39

Art
No.	Title	Writer(s)	Original album	Length
1.	"Left to My Own Devices" (7" version)		Introspective (1988)	4:48
2.	"I Don't Know What You Want But I Can't Give It Any More" (single version)		Nightlife (1999)	4:25
3.	"Flamboyant"		previously unreleased	3:50 (Note: 3:40 on US release)
4.	"Being Boring" (7" version)		Behaviour (1990)	4:50
5.	"Can You Forgive Her?"		Very (1993)	3:53
6.	"West End Girls" (7" version)		Please (1986)	4:04
7.	"I Get Along" (radio edit)		Release (2002)	4:11
8.	"So Hard"		Behaviour (1990)	3:59
9.	"Rent" (7" version)		Actually (1987)	3:33
10.	"Jealousy" (7" version)		Behaviour (1990)	4:15
11.	"DJ Culture"		Discography: The Complete Singles Collection (1991)	4:21
12.	"You Only Tell Me You Love Me When You're Drunk"		Nightlife (1999)	3:13
13.	"Liberation"		Very (1993)	4:06
14.	"Paninaro '95"		non-album single (1995)	4:10
15.	"Opportunities (Let's Make Lots of Money)"		Please (1986)	3:45
16.	"Yesterday, When I Was Mad" (single version)		Very (1993)	4:01
17.	"Single-Bilingual" (single version)		Bilingual (1996)	3:30
18.	"Somewhere" (single version)	Leonard Bernstein; Stephen Sondheim	non-album single (1997)	4:42
Total length:				73:36

Limited edition

Mix
No.	Title	Length
1.	"Can You Forgive Her?" (Rollo remix)	6:02
2.	"So Hard" (David Morales Red Zone mix)	7:44
3.	"What Have I Done to Deserve This?" (Shep Pettibone mix)	8:10
4.	"West End Girls" (Sasha mix)	7:45
5.	"Miserablism" (Moby Electro mix)	5:35
6.	"Before" (Classic Paradise mix (Note: The Classic Paradise mix is misattributed to producer Danny Tenaglia on the original PopArt track list but is credited to Love to Infinity on subsequent releases.))	7:58
7.	"I Don't Know What You Want but I Can't Give It Any More" (Peter Rauhofer New York mix)	10:28
8.	"New York City Boy" (Lange mix)	7:07
9.	"Young Offender" (Jam & Spoon Trip-o-matic Fairy Tale mix)	7:20
10.	"Love Comes Quickly" (Blank & Jones mix)	5:00

== DVD ==
1. "Opportunities (Let's Make Lots of Money)" (original version)
2. "West End Girls"
3. "Love Comes Quickly"
4. "Opportunities (Let's Make Lots of Money)" (second version)
5. "Suburbia"
6. "Paninaro"
7. "It's a Sin"
8. "What Have I Done to Deserve This?"
9. "Rent"
10. "Always on My Mind"
11. "Heart"
12. "Domino Dancing"
13. "Left to My Own Devices"
14. "It's Alright"
15. "So Hard"
16. "Being Boring"
17. "How Can You Expect to Be Taken Seriously?"
18. "Where the Streets Have No Name (I Can't Take My Eyes Off You)"
19. "Jealousy"
20. "DJ Culture"
21. "Was It Worth It?"
22. "Can You Forgive Her?"
23. "Go West"
24. "I Wouldn't Normally Do This Kind of Thing"
25. "Liberation"
26. "Yesterday, When I Was Mad"
27. "Paninaro '95"
28. "Before"
29. "Se a Vida É (That's the Way Life Is)"
30. "Single-Bilingual"
31. "A Red Letter Day"
32. "Somewhere"
33. "I Don't Know What You Want but I Can't Give It Any More"
34. "New York City Boy"
35. "You Only Tell Me You Love Me When You're Drunk"
36. "Home and Dry"
37. "I Get Along/E-mail"
38. "London"
39. "Domino Dancing" (extended version) [The 12" and Introspective Mix]
40. "So Hard" (extended version) [The "Extended Dance Mix"]
41. "Go West" (extended version) [The Mings Gone West: First and Second Movement Video Mix]

== Charts ==
=== Weekly charts ===
Chart (2003–2004)	Peak position
Belgian Albums (Ultratop Flanders)	89
Belgian Albums (Ultratop Wallonia)	42
Danish Albums (Hitlisten)	29
German Albums (Offizielle Top 100)	24
Norwegian Albums (VG-lista)	2
Spanish Albums (AFYVE)	36
Swedish Albums (Sverigetopplistan)	20
Swiss Albums (Schweizer Hitparade)	99

Chart (2006)	Peak position
US Top Dance Albums (Billboard)	19

Chart (2009)	Peak position
Scottish Albums (OCC)	25
UK Albums (OCC)	18

=== Year-end charts ===
Chart (2003)	Position
UK Albums (OCC)	174

== Certifications ==
Certifications for PopArt: The Hits
Region	Certification	Certified units/sales
Germany (BVMI)	Gold	100,000^{^}
United Kingdom (BPI)	Platinum	300,000^{^}
^{^} Shipments figures based on certification alone.
