= Heart (Pet Shop Boys song) =

1988 single by Pet Shop Boys

Single by Pet Shop Boys

from the album Actually
- B-side: "I Get Excited (You Get Excited Too)"
- Released: 21 March 1988
- Genre: Synth-pop
- Length: 3:57 (album version); 4:16 (7-inch version); 8:55 (12-inch version)
- Label: Parlophone
- Songwriters: Neil Tennant; Chris Lowe
- Producers: Andy Richards; Pet Shop Boys

Pet Shop Boys singles chronology
| "Always on My Mind" (1987) | "Heart" (1988) | "Domino Dancing" (1988) |

"Heart" is a song by English synth-pop duo Pet Shop Boys from their second studio album, Actually (1987). It was released as the album's fourth and final single on 21 March 1988 by Parlophone. The song topped the UK Singles Chart for three weeks in April 1988, becoming the duo's fourth and most recent number-one single in the United Kingdom as of 2026. The music video was filmed in Slovenia; it was directed by Jack Bond and starred Ian McKellen as a vampire.

== Background and composition ==
The genesis of "Heart" goes back to the recording sessions for the duo's first album Please (1986) at Advision Studios. Neil Tennant wrote the opening verse on the way to the studio, and Chris Lowe composed the music on the piano. They were inspired by the song "I Like You" by Phyllis Nelson, which was mixed by Shep Pettibone.

Originally, the duo had considered offering "Heart" to hi-NRG singer Hazell Dean, and they also thought it suited Madonna, but they ultimately kept it for themselves and asked Pettibone to produce it for Actually. The song was also intended to be used in the Steven Spielberg-produced film Innerspace, but the dance sequence it was intended for was at the wrong tempo for the song.

The duo decided not to use the Pettibone version of "Heart" on Actually and asked Andy Richards to produce it instead. The single is Richards' original version, featuring syn drums and J.J. Belle playing guitar with pronounced treble-heavy funk feel, giving the song more of a 1970s sound. The album version was mixed by Julian Mendelsohn, with the guitar part removed. An error on the album remix resulted in the lyrics starting with "Beat" instead of "Heartbeat", and they decided to keep it.

Tennant described "Heart" as "a one-off cheerful love song". The lyrics are more traditional than most Pet Shop Boys songs, being a straightforward declaration of love—a characteristic common in many pop songs. On the commentary of the Pet Shop Boys' live video album Cubism, Tennant reveals that the "oh – ah – oh'oh ah" refrain which repeats throughout the song features the vocals of himself, Pavarotti and Wendy Smith of Prefab Sprout.

== Release ==
The song was originally called "Heartbeat", but the title was changed after Culture Club drummer Jon Moss announced the formation of a group named Heartbeat UK. "Heart" was planned as the first single from Actually but it was replaced by "It's a Sin", which was considered to be the more commercial option. Upon its release as the album's fourth single in March 1988, "Heart" debuted at number seven on the UK Singles Chart and rose to the top spot the following week, where it held for three weeks. To date, "Heart" is the last Pet Shop Boys single to reach number one in the UK.

"Heart" was the second Pet Shop Boys single, after "Always on My Mind", to reach number one on the Eurochart Hot 100 Singles. It placed at number one in Finland, Ireland, Switzerland, and West Germany, as well as New Zealand, and in the top ten in Austria, Belgium, Norway, Spain, and Sweden, along with South Africa (see Charts). "Heart" was not released as a single in the United States.

Shep Pettibone did two remixes of "Heart"—the "Dance Mix" and the "Dub Mix". His original recording of "Heart" with Pet Shop Boys appears on the reissue Actually: Further Listening 1987–1988.

On the retrospective collection PopArt: The Hits (2003), the album version of the track was used for the UK release rather than the hit single mix, while the single mix was included on the US release. The single version was included on the compilations Discography: The Complete Singles Collection (1991) and Smash: The Singles 1985–2020 (2023).

In 2024, Pet Shop Boys released a new recording of "Heart" on Furthermore, the bonus EP with the two-disc version of their fifteenth album, Nonetheless.

=== Artwork ===
The single covers were designed by Mark Farrow with photographs by Eric Watson. There were two versions of the 7-inch single. One featured Tennant (pictured) wearing a suit and bowler hat, looking down with his hands clasped on his lap. The other showed Lowe in the same pose, wearing an Issey Miyake fisherman's mac and hat with industrial dungarees, which he had worn at the 1988 Brit Awards. The CD and the 12-inch remix covers used the photo of Tennant, with a blurred image of Lowe standing behind him "waving his arms in a fashion reminiscent of a Francis Bacon painting". The 7-inch and 12-inch covers have a brown tint, and the CD is tinted blue. The typeface is a Helvetica bold font; the 12-inch remix single has the word REMIX instead of HEART.

The covers won the Wood Pencil award for Best Individual Album or Single Sleeve at the 1989 D&AD Awards.

== Critical reception ==
In his review of the single, Jonh Wilde from Melody Maker felt that "after their lugubrious reading of "Always on My Mind", things diminish further with this sour self-parody." Jonathan Romney from NME wrote, "Obviously, the Boys' injection of their vital juices into Patsy Kensit ["I'm Not Scared"] has left them quite drained poor things. This is their limpest single yet. The strange thing is, if this record were by New Order, it'd have the same banal robotic beat, the same banal lyrics, the same bored-witless singing, and it'd be universally acclaimed as a transcendental masterpiece. And it would be too." Johnny Dee from Record Mirror named the song Single of the Week, adding, "'Heart' is immediate modern, compact and remixed from the album, actually, it's what the kids want, it's what I want! This 45 contains every gimmick the Petties have toyed with since 'West End Girls'. Neil and Chris — you are the Marks & Spencer of pop music, the high street gods of the Eighties." The magazine's James Hamilton described the song as a "jittery tuneful Eurobeat throbber" in his dance column.

== Music video ==
Directed by Jack Bond, who also made the band's 1988 film It Couldn't Happen Here, the music video for "Heart" is a resetting of the Dracula story. The video opens with Tennant and his bride, played by model Danijela Čolić Prižmić, being driven to a castle with Lowe as his chauffeur. As he goes to bed with his bride, the vampire, played by Ian McKellen, spies them. Later, he seduces the bride and bites her. Finally, Lowe drives the vampire and his bride away, leaving Tennant to stare bitterly after them from a castle window. The video was shot in Mokrice Castle, Slovenia, then one of the Yugoslavia republics. According to Bond, the image of the bat above the castle came from Werner Herzog, who directed the Dracula adaptation Nosferatu the Vampyre (1979).

== Live performances ==
"Heart" was performed on the Pet Shop Boys' first tour in 1989, with a film projection by Derek Jarman featuring dancers in a club. The song was revived for the Pandemonium Tour in 2009–2010, opening the show in a mix with "More Than a Dream" from Yes (2009). The performance is included on the live album Pandemonium. "Heart" was also played on the Dreamworld: The Greatest Hits Live tour in 2022–2024.

== Track listings ==
- 7-inch: Parlophone / R 6177 (UK)
1. "Heart" – 4:16
2. "I Get Excited (You Get Excited Too)" – 4:53
- 12-inch: Parlophone / 12 R 6177 (UK)
1. "Heart" (disco mix) – 8:27
2. "I Get Excited (You Get Excited Too)" – 4:53
3. "Heart" (dance mix) – 6:08
- also released on cassette (TCR 6177) and CD (CDR 6177)
- 12-inch: Parlophone / 12 RX 6177 (UK)
1. "Heart" (12-inch remix) – 8:55
2. "Heart" (dub mix) – 5:15
3. "I Get Excited (You Get Excited Too)" – 4:53

== Personnel ==
Personnel are adapted from the liner notes of Actually: Further Listening 1987–1988 and "Heart".

Pet Shop Boys

- Neil Tennant
- Chris Lowe

Additional musicians

- J.J. Belle – guitar (single versions)
- Andy Richards – keyboard programming, Fairlight programming

Technical personnel

- Andy Richards – production
- Tony Phllips – engineering
- Julian Mendelsohn – mixing (album version)
- Nick Webb – mastering

Artwork

- Mark Farrow and Pet Shop Boys – design
- Eric Watson – photography

== Charts ==
=== Weekly charts ===
Weekly chart performance for "Heart"
| Chart (1988) | Peak position |
|---|---|
| Australia (Australian Music Report) | 18 |
| Austria (Ö3 Austria Top 40) | 3 |
| Belgium (Ultratop 50 Flanders) | 7 |
| Canada Dance/Urban (RPM) | 1 |
| Europe (Eurochart Hot 100) | 1 |
| Finland (Suomen virallinen lista) | 1 |
| France (SNEP) | 36 |
| Ireland (IRMA) | 1 |
| Italy (Musica e dischi) | 24 |
| Luxembourg (Radio Luxembourg) | 1 |
| Netherlands (Dutch Top 40) | 11 |
| Netherlands (Single Top 100) | 11 |
| New Zealand (Recorded Music NZ) | 1 |
| Norway (VG-lista) | 6 |
| Quebec (ADISQ) | 16 |
| South Africa (Springbok Radio) | 6 |
| Spain (AFYVE) | 2 |
| Sweden (Sverigetopplistan) | 9 |
| Switzerland (Schweizer Hitparade) | 1 |
| UK Singles (Official Charts) | 1 |
| West Germany (GfK) | 1 |

=== Year-end charts ===
Year-end chart performance for "Heart"
| Chart (1988) | Position |
|---|---|
| Belgium (Ultratop 50 Flanders) | 77 |
| Canada Dance/Urban (RPM) | 15 |
| Europe (Eurochart Hot 100 Singles) | 14 |
| New Zealand (RIANZ) | 23 |
| Switzerland (Schweizer Hitparade) | 20 |
| UK Singles (Gallup) | 26 |
| West Germany (Media Control) | 12 |
