= Suburbia (song) =

1986 single by Pet Shop Boys

Single by Pet Shop Boys

from the album Please
- B-side: "Paninaro"; "Jack the Lad"
- Written: 1985
- Released: 22 September 1986
- Genre: Dance-pop; synth-pop
- Length: 5:06 (album version); 4:02 (single version); 5:11 (video mix); 8:55 (12-inch version)
- Label: Parlophone
- Songwriters: Neil Tennant; Chris Lowe
- Producer: Julian Mendelsohn

Pet Shop Boys singles chronology
"Opportunities (Let's Make Lots of Money)" (1986)	"Suburbia" (1986)	"It's a Sin" (1987)

"Suburbia" is a song by English synth-pop duo Pet Shop Boys from their debut album, Please (1986). It was re-recorded with producer Julian Mendelsohn for release as the fourth single from the album. Peaking at number eight on the UK Singles Chart, "Suburbia" was the band's second top 10 hit after "West End Girls", and in their view it saved them from becoming a one-hit wonder.

== Background and recording ==
The song's primary inspiration was the 1983 Penelope Spheeris film Suburbia, and its depiction of violence and squalor in the suburbs of Los Angeles. The recent events of the Brixton riots of 1981 and of 1985 were another influence. The lyrics convey the boredom of suburbia ("I only wanted something else to do but hang around") and the underlying tension among disaffected youth. The music is punctuated by sounds of suburban violence, riots, and smashing glass, along with barking dogs—a motif derived from scenes in Spheeris's film.

"Suburbia" was written in 1985 at Terminal Studios in London. Chris Lowe composed the music; according to him, the bassline was inspired by Madonna's hit song of that time, "Into the Groove". Neil Tennant wrote the lyrics afterwards. They added car crash samples from an Emulator and riot noises from a film. The duo did not have time to rework the track during the 10-week recording session for Please, and the album version is essentially a polished version of their demo.

A completely new version was made for the single, using barking dogs recorded at Battersea Dogs & Cats Home, audio of riots obtained from the BBC, and real breaking glass. Julian Mendelsohn brought in Fairlight programmer Andy Richards, who created a horn section sound with the synth line. Gary Barnacle played saxophone on the track. The single version is an edit of a longer piece called "Suburbia (The Full Horror)", which includes a spoken word segment with the refrain, "Suburbia, where the suburbs met utopia…", and ends in a series of explosions.

== Release ==
Pet Shop Boys had thought that their career might be on a downward trajectory when "Love Comes Quickly", the follow-up single to their number one hit "West End Girls", only reached 19 on the UK Singles Chart, but "Suburbia" alleviated those concerns. In a 2023 interview with Classic Pop, Tennant recalled, "When we finished ["Suburbia"] with Julian Mendelsohn, I thought: 'Now, that is a hit record', and it was huge, particularly in Germany and France. "Suburbia" led to "It's a Sin" and everything that followed."

"Suburbia" was released on 22 September 1986. It spent four weeks in the top 10 of the UK Singles Chart, with two weeks at its peak position of number eight. The duo promoted the single heavily in Europe, where it received widespread radio airplay. In West Germany, "Suburbia" was in the top 10 for nine weeks from 10 November 1986 to 12 January 1987; its peak position was number two, which it held for four weeks. The song was also a top 10 hit in Belgium, the Netherlands, Spain, Ireland, Switzerland, New Zealand, Sweden, and Austria (see Charts).

The B-side of the 7-inch single had Lowe's first lead vocal appearance, "Paninaro". A 7-inch EP in a double pack sleeve, limited to 25,000 copies, came with the standard single on one disc and a Shep Pettibone remix of "Love Comes Quickly" backed with "Jack the Lad" and the short edit "Suburbia Part 2" on the other. "Suburbia (The Full Horror)" was released as a 12-inch single and is also on Disco and the reissue Please: Further Listening 1984–1986.

The 7-inch version of "Suburbia" has been included on the compilation albums Discography: The Complete Singles Collection, Ultimate, and Smash: The Singles 1985–2020. PopArt: The Hits includes the "Video Mix" from the music video, which has an intro featuring the spoken word refrain.

Two remixes of "Suburbia" by Arthur Baker, the "Club Vocal Mix" and the "Dub Mix", were originally used on a promotional 12-inch EP. In 2023, both remixes were released by Pet Shop Boys as digital downloads, and the "Club Vocal Mix" was included on Arthur Baker: The Classic Dance Remixes from Baker's Dance Masters series.

=== Artwork ===
The sleeves for the single were designed by Mark Farrow with photos by Eric Watson. The standard 7-inch single (pictured) has a motion-blurred image of Tennant holding Lowe in a headlock. The main 12-inch single has a selenium-toned portrait of Lowe wearing a striped Poshboy shirt and a pair of Issey Miyake shutter sunglasses. Farrow won a Design and Art Direction silver award for the 12-inch sleeve, and Watson's portrait of Lowe is in the Photographs Collection of the National Portrait Gallery, London.

== Music video ==
The video was directed by Eric Watson and features footage of the duo in a Los Angeles suburb, while they were there for that year's MTV Video Music Awards, and a contrasting image of British suburbia, filmed in Kingston-upon-Thames, a suburb of south-west London. It opens with the barking dog motif in an extended "Video Mix" of the song, and dogs appear throughout. Tennant and Lowe are shown walking in the streets among the residents and sitting on a sofa in a house full of unpacked boxes, which represent sudden wealth and the acquisition of things that haven't been used, according to Watson.

== Live performances ==
During the theatrical spectacle of the 1991 Performance Tour, "Suburbia" was staged with the duo in cages surrounded by little red houses as Tennant pretended to undergo electroshock therapy. "Suburbia" has been played on subsequent tours and was the opening number on the Dreamworld: The Greatest Hits Live tour which began in 2022. The distinctive barking dog intro also opened the medley of hits they performed at the 2009 Brit Awards.

== Track listings ==
All tracks written by Neil Tennant and Chris Lowe.

7-inch: Parlophone / R 6140 (UK)

1. "Suburbia" – 4:06
2. "Paninaro" – 4:37

2×7-inch: Parlophone / RD 6140 (UK)

1. "Suburbia" – 4:05
2. "Paninaro" – 4:37
3. "Love Comes Quickly" [Shep Pettibone Mastermix] (Early Fade) – 6:12
4. "Jack the Lad" – 4:30
5. "Suburbia Pt. Two" – 2:20

MC: Parlophone / TC R 6140 (UK)

1. "Suburbia" – 4:06
2. "Paninaro" – 4:37
3. "Jack the Lad" – 4:30
4. "Love Comes Quickly" [Shep Pettibone Mastermix] – 7:34

MC: Parlophone / TR 6140 (UK)

1. "Suburbia" (The Full Horror) – 8:55
2. "Paninaro" – 4:37
3. "Jack the Lad" – 4:30
4. "Love Comes Quickly" [Shep Pettibone Mastermix] (Even Earlier Fade) – 5:31

12-inch: Parlophone / 12 R 6140 (UK)

1. "Suburbia" (The Full Horror) – 8:55
2. "Paninaro" – 4:37
3. "Jack the Lad" – 4:30

12-inch: EMI America / V-19226 (US)

1. "Suburbia" (The Full Horror) – 8:55
2. "Suburbia" (7-inch version) – 4:06
3. "Jack the Lad" – 4:30

== Personnel ==
Credits adapted from the liner notes for Please: Further Listening 1984–1986 and "Suburbia".

Pet Shop Boys

- Neil Tennant
- Chris Lowe

Additional musicians

- Andy Richards – Fairlight programming (single versions)
- Gary Barnacle – saxophone (single versions)

Technical

- Julian Mendelsohn – production, engineering (single versions)
- Stephen Hague – production (album version)
- David Jacob – engineering (album version)

Artwork

- Mark Farrow and PSB – design
- Eric Watson – photography

== Charts ==
=== Weekly charts ===
Weekly chart performance for "Suburbia"
Chart (1986–1987)	Peak position
Austria (Ö3 Austria Top 40)	9
Belgium (Ultratop 50 Flanders)	1
Europe (European Hot 100 Singles)	11
Finland (Suomen virallinen lista)	13
Ireland (IRMA)	3
Luxembourg (Radio Luxembourg)	30
Netherlands (Dutch Top 40)	2
Netherlands (Single Top 100)	3
New Zealand (Recorded Music NZ)	5
Spain (AFYVE)	2
Sweden (Sverigetopplistan)	6
Switzerland (Schweizer Hitparade)	3
UK Singles (Official Charts)	8
US Billboard Hot 100	70
US Dance Club Songs (Billboard)	46
US Dance Singles Sales (Billboard)	37
US Cash Box Top 100 Singles	79
West Germany (GfK)	2

Weekly chart performance for "Suburbia"
Chart (2023)	Peak position
UK Singles Downloads (Official Charts)	60

=== Year-end charts ===
Year-end chart performance for "Suburbia"
Chart (1986)	Position
UK Singles (OCC)	80

Year-end chart performance for "Suburbia"
Chart (1987)	Position
Belgium (Ultratop 50 Flanders)	55
West Germany (Media Control)	55

In Australia, "Suburbia" missed the Kent Music Report Top 100 Singles chart but was listed as one of the singles receiving significant sales reports beyond the top 100 for one week in November 1986, being ranked tenth on this list.
