= Disco (Pet Shop Boys album) =

Remix album by Pet Shop Boys
- Released: 17 November 1986
- Recorded: 1985–1986
- Genres: Synth-pop; dance-pop; disco
- Length: 46:02
- Label: Parlophone
- Producers: Pet Shop Boys; Phil Harding; Julian Mendelsohn; J. J. Jeczalik; Nicholas Froome; Stephen Hague

Pet Shop Boys chronology
Please (1986)	Disco (1986)	Actually (1987)

Disco is the first remix album by English synth-pop duo Pet Shop Boys, released on 17 November 1986 by Parlophone in the United Kingdom and by EMI America Records in the United States. Disco consists of remixes of tracks from the band's debut album Please and its respective B-sides. The album includes remixes by Arthur Baker, Shep Pettibone and Pet Shop Boys themselves.

== Critical reception ==
Professional ratings
Review scores
Source	Rating
AllMusic	2/5 stars
Q	4/5 stars
Record Mirror	3.5/5 stars
Robert Christgau	B
Sounds	4/5 stars

Roger Holland of Sounds observed: "...you really can't blame the quite excellent synthetic pop combo Pet Shop Boys for taking six tracks off their 'Please' album and selling us a disco remix set of both quality and distinction just in time for Xmas. However, you can wonder whether it was wise? Despite the instant pop insistency of tracks like 'Opportunities' and 'Suburbia' — and despite the fact that these pleasurably long dance treatments will delight anyone who loved early Soft Cell — you can't help but thinking that perhaps this follow up to a chart topping debut album should have contained at least a couple of new songs. But suspend your cynicism for three quarters of an hour and accept 'DISCO' on its own terms".

Ira Robbins of Trouser Press commented on "the crassness of their motives" and critiqued several tracks: "the dreamy "Love Comes Quickly" (botched by the incongruous ticking sequencers) and the sarcastic "Suburbia," subtitled here "The Full Horror" and loaded with barking dogs and other ambient ephemera. A crackling snare drum on "West End Girls" is likewise an extraneous annoyance".

Danny Van Emden of Music Week felt that the "West End Girls" remix "actually improves on their debut number one version" and said of Disco: "... this is not your average remix cash-in after a few hits. This specially priced 45-minute six-tracker is definitely a cut above the rest with inventive play-loud remixes by Shep Pettibone, Arthur Baker and others". He concluded, it "neatly reveals how the PSB have grown into something bigger than you dared to hope". Eleanor Levy of Record Mirror wrote: "This opportunist LP of remixes of six of the tracks from the 'Please' album is slick, lively and impeccably classy. You smile, you tap your foot — you grudgingly admit that these Pet Shop Boys are probably the best top drawer pop group of the moment".

== Track listing ==
All tracks are written by Neil Tennant and Chris Lowe, except "Love Comes Quickly" by Tennant, Lowe and Stephen Hague.

Side one
No.	Title	Producer(s)	Length
1.	"In the Night" (Extended Mix)	Pet Shop Boys; Phil Harding; Baker^{[a]}	6:25
2.	"Suburbia" (The Full Horror)	Mendelsohn	8:55
3.	"Opportunities (Let's Make Lots of Money)" (Version Latina)	J. J. Jeczalik; Nicholas Froome; Miller^{[a]}; Latin Rascals^{[a]}	5:29

Side two
No.	Title	Producer(s)	Length
1.	"Paninaro" (Italian Remix)	Pet Shop Boys; David Jacob^{[a]}	8:35
2.	"Love Comes Quickly" (Shep Pettibone Mastermix)	Hague; Pettibone^{[a]}	7:35
3.	"West End Girls" (Disco Mix)	Hague; Pettibone^{[a]}	9:03
Total length:			46:02

=== Notes ===
- ^{^[a]} signifies the remix producer

== Personnel ==
Credits adapted from CD liner notes.

- Arthur Baker – remixing (1)
- Julian Mendelsohn – mixing (2), producer (2)
- Ron Dean Miller – remixing (3)
- Latin Rascals – remixing (3)
- Pet Shop Boys – remixing (4), producers (1, 4)
- David Jacob – remixing (4), engineer (4)
- Shep Pettibone – remixing (5–6)
- Phil Harding – producer (1), engineer (1)
- Andy Richards – Fairlight (2)
- Gary Barnacle – saxophone (2)
- J. J. Jeczalik – producer (3)
- Nicholas Froome – producer (3)
- Blue Weaver – additional keyboards (3)
- Khris Kallis – additional keyboards (3)
- Adrien Cook – Fairlight (4)
- Stephen Hague – producer (5, 6)
- Andy Mackay – saxophone (5)
- Mark Farrow – sleeve

== Charts ==
=== Weekly charts ===
Weekly chart performance for Disco
Chart (1986–1987)	Peak position
Austrian Albums (Ö3 Austria)	17
Canada Top Albums/CDs (RPM)	83
Dutch Albums (Album Top 100)	16
European Albums (Music & Media)	16
German Albums (Offizielle Top 100)	10
New Zealand Albums (RMNZ)	19
Spanish Albums (AFYVE)	10
Swedish Albums (Sverigetopplistan)	33
Swiss Albums (Schweizer Hitparade)	18
UK Albums (Official Charts)	15
US Billboard 200	95
US Dance Club Songs (Billboard)	12
US Dance Singles Sales (Billboard)	36

=== Year-end charts ===
Year-end chart performance for Disco
Chart (1987)	Position
European Albums (Music & Media)	59
UK Albums (Gallup)	91

== Certifications and sales ==
Certifications and sales for Disco
Region	Certification	Certified units/sales
Brazil	—	110,000
Germany (BVMI)	Gold	250,000^{^}
United Kingdom (BPI)	Platinum	300,000^{^}
^{^} Shipments figures based on certification alone.
