= Paninaro (song) =

1986 song by Pet Shop Boys

"Paninaro '95"

Single by Pet Shop Boys
- B-side: "In the Night '95"; "Girls & Boys" (live in Rio)
- Released: 24 July 1995
- Genre: Synth-pop; hi-NRG
- Length: 4:40 (original 1986 version); 4:07 (1995 remix)
- Label: Parlophone
- Songwriters: Neil Tennant; Chris Lowe
- Producer: Pet Shop Boys

Pet Shop Boys singles chronology
"Yesterday, When I Was Mad" (1994)	"Paninaro '95" (1995)	"Before" (1996)

Music video
- "Paninaro '95" on YouTube

"Paninaro" is a song by English synth-pop duo Pet Shop Boys, originally a B-side to the 1986 single "Suburbia". In 1995, a re-recording titled "Paninaro '95" was released to a wider market, to promote the duo's B-side compilation album Alternative, though only the original version was included on the compilation.

== Background ==
"Paninaro" is about the 1980s Italian youth subculture known as the paninari; derived from the word panino, they were known for congregating in restaurants serving sandwiches and in the first US-style fast food restaurants, as well as their preference for designer clothing and 1980s pop music, such as New Romantic music and Italo disco. Neil Tennant has said that they were drawn to the concept due to having shared those preferences.

== Lyrics ==
"Paninaro" is one of the few Pet Shop Boys songs in which Chris Lowe provides the majority of the vocals. Tennant, meanwhile, only sings the title repeatedly in intervals.

The main lyrical motif consists of eight words:

Passion and love and sex and money
Violence, religion, injustice and death

These words are repeated at the end of the song in a soliloquy to the singer's "lover".

Alluding to the fashion of the paninari, references to prestigious Italian fashion designers are repeated throughout the song:

Armani, Armani, ah-ah-Armani
Versace, cinque

"Versace" was removed from the 7-inch B-side and from the 1995 version, because the duo felt he didn't fit the concept, but the name was left on the 12-inch version by mistake.

In addition, the middle of the song contains a sample from a statement by Lowe in a 1986 Entertainment Tonight interview with the band:

I don’t like country-and-western. I don’t like rock music. I don’t like, I don’t like rockabilly or rock ’n’ roll particularly. Don’t like much really, do I? But what I do like I love passionately.

According to Neil Tennant, the use of "Woh, woh, woh" in his backing vocals was influenced by the song "Tarzan Boy" by Baltimora. He clarified this by stating "We wrote it because you could go 'woh, woh, woh.' We were obsessed with songs that had 'woh, woh, woh' in them. Remember 'Tarzan Boy' by Baltimora?".

=== 1995 version ===
The new recording included a rap in the middle of the song, newly written by Lowe; it laments the loss of the "lover" referred to in the pre-existing lyrics. The written lyrics in the finale are also changed to "were" rather than "are" in referring to the lost love.

== Releases ==
=== Original 1986 version ===
The song was released in Italy as a limited edition 12" single, featuring the "Italian" remix (Disco album version) and an exclusive remix by Ian Levine who would go on to remix "It's a Sin".

It came to wider attention as the B-side to "Suburbia" before appearing as an extended mix (a.k.a. the "Italian" remix) on the 1986 remix album Disco. It later appeared on the 1998 compilation album Essential and on Please: Further Listening 1984–1986.

=== 1995 version ===
A radical new version was written and performed on the Discovery tour of South America in November/December 1994. It appeared on the Discovery: Live in Rio 1994 video released on 7 August 1995. A preview of the concert recording was broadcast on BBC Radio One on 29 May 1995, just prior to "Paninaro '95" being issued as a single in July.

The 1995 version received remixes from Angel Moraes, Tin Tin Out, and Tracy & Sharon. Tom Stephan of Tracy & Sharon would continue to remix for the Pet Shop Boys as his later alias Superchumbo.

The 1995 version is included on the 2003 compilation album PopArt: The Hits, Bilingual: Further Listening 1995–1997 and the 2023 Smash: The Singles 1985–2020 compilation.

== Critical reception ==
Pan-European magazine Music & Media wrote, "Re-released to draw attention to the vital Alternative Pet Shop Boys sampler which contains all the B-sides, this is abundant proof of who's got the best melodies in electro pop." David Hemingway of Melody Maker named "Paninaro" one of the magazine's "single[s] of the week" and called it "perfection". He noted how the original version, a "celebration of Italian Cool Kids", is "reinvented as the most passionately heartbreaking ex-lover song ever". David Quantick of NME described it as "the great lost Pet Shop B-side".

== Music videos ==
=== Original ===
A self-produced music video, filmed in Italy, was used for the original release; it consisted of footage of the duo singing the song alongside locals.

=== 1995 version ===
The "Paninaro '95" video was directed by long-time Pet Shop Boys director Howard Greenhalgh. The Top of the Pops performance of "Paninaro '95" replicated the imagery of the music video, with the same costumes, lighting, and male dancers involved.

== Track listings ==
- Italian limited-edition 12-inch single (1986)

A. "Paninaro" (Italian Remix) – 8:40
B. "Paninaro" (Ian Levine Mix) – 9:43

- UK CD 1 (1995)
1. "Paninaro '95" (Extended Mix) – 7:30
2. "Paninaro '95" (Tin Tin Out Mix) – 7:47
3. "Paninaro '95" (Tracy's 12' Mix) – 8:30
4. "Paninaro '95" (Sharon's Sexy Boyz Dub) – 5:47
5. "Paninaro '95" (Angel Moraes' Deep Dance Mix) – 10:39
- UK CD 2 (1995)
1. "Paninaro '95" – 4:10
2. "In the Night '95" – 4:24
3. "Girls & Boys" (Pet Shop Boys live in Rio) – 5:04
- UK 12-inch single – The Remixes Part One (1995)

A1. "Paninaro '95" (Tracy's 12″ Mix) – 8:28
A2. "Paninaro '95" (Sharon's Sexy Boyz Dub) – 5:47
B1. "Paninaro '95" (Tin Tin Out Mix) – 7:47
B2. "Paninaro '95" (Pet Shop Boys Extended Mix) – 7:30

- UK 12-inch single – The Remixes Part Two (1995)

A. "Paninaro '95" (Angel Moraes' Deep Dance Mix) – 10:39
B1. "Paninaro '95" (Angel Moraes' Girls Boys in Dub) – 11:57
B2. "Paninaro '95" (Angel Moraes' The Hot N Spycy Dub) – 9:35

== Charts ==
=== Weekly charts ===
Weekly chart performance for "Paninaro '95"
Chart (1995)	Peak position
Australia (ARIA)	30
Belgium (Ultratop 50 Flanders)	35
Canada Dance/Urban (RPM)	19
Europe (Eurochart Hot 100)	31
Europe (European Dance Radio)	6
Europe (European Hit Radio)	31
Finland (Suomen virallinen lista)	5
Germany (GfK)	39
Iceland (Íslenski Listinn Topp 40)	33
Ireland (IRMA)	25
Israel (Israeli Singles Chart)	1
Netherlands (Dutch Top 40)	30
Netherlands (Single Top 100)	37
Sweden (Sverigetopplistan)	24
UK Singles (Official Charts)	15
UK Pop Tip Club Chart (Music Week)	39
US Dance Club Songs (Billboard)	4
US Dance Singles Sales (Billboard)	6

=== Year-end charts ===
Year-end chart performance for "Paninaro '95"
Chart (1995)	Peak position
Israel (Israeli Singles Chart)	43

== Release history ==
Release dates and formats for "Paninaro '95"
Region	Date	Format(s)	Label(s)	Ref.
United Kingdom	24 July 1995	CD1; cassette	Parlophone	
United Kingdom	31 July 1995	CD2	Parlophone	
United Kingdom	21 August 1995	12-inch vinyl	Parlophone	
Australia	28 August 1995	CD; cassette	Parlophone	
Japan	30 August 1995	Mini-CD	EMI	
