= Lost (Pet Shop Boys EP) =

EP by Pet Shop Boys
- Released: 14 April 2023
- Recorded: 2015–2016
- Genre: Dance-pop
- Length: 20:29
- Label: x2
- Producer: Chris Lowe; Neil Tennant

Pet Shop Boys chronology
Discovery: Live in Rio 1994 (2021)	Lost (2023)	Smash: The Singles 1985–2020 (2023)

Lost is an extended play released on 14 April 2023 by English synth-pop duo Pet Shop Boys on the band's own label x2. The EP features four tracks that were unused from sessions for their 2016 album Super. The digital release includes a fifth track, "Living in the Past", a new song about Vladimir Putin.

== Reception ==
Writing for The Daily Telegraph, Emma Harrison recognised this as one of the albums of the week, rating it four out of five stars, commenting on the mixture of both political commentary and danceable music.

== Track listing ==
All songs written by Chris Lowe and Neil Tennant

1. "The Lost Room" – 4:12
2. "I Will Fall" – 4:38
3. "Skeletons in the Closet" – 3:03
4. "Kaputnik" – 3:58
5. "Living in the Past" – 4:36

Track 5 is included on the digital release only.

== Personnel ==
Pet Shop Boys

- Chris Lowe – vocals, instrumentation, design, production
- Neil Tennant – vocals, instrumentation, design, production

Additional personnel

- Farrow Design – design
- Pete Gleadall – engineering, mixing

== See also ==
- List of 2023 albums
