= It's a Sin =

1987 single by Pet Shop Boys

Single by Pet Shop Boys

from the album Actually
- B-side: "You Know Where You Went Wrong"
- Written: 1982
- Released: 15 June 1987
- Recorded: 1987
- Genre: Synth-pop; dance-pop; disco; hi-NRG; new wave; post-disco
- Length: 4:59
- Label: Parlophone
- Songwriters: Neil Tennant; Chris Lowe
- Producer: Julian Mendelsohn

Pet Shop Boys singles chronology
"Suburbia" (1986)	"It's a Sin" (1987)	"What Have I Done to Deserve This?" (1987)

Audio sample
- "It's a Sin": file; help

"It's a Sin" (also stylised "It's a sin.") is a song by English synth-pop duo Pet Shop Boys from their second studio album, Actually (1987). Written by Chris Lowe and Neil Tennant, the song was released on 15 June 1987 as the album's lead single. It became the duo's second number-one single on the UK singles chart, spending three weeks atop the chart. Additionally, the single topped the charts in over 15 other countries, including Austria, Denmark, Finland, West Germany, Ireland, Israel, Luxembourg, Norway, Poland, Portugal, South Africa, Spain, Sweden, Switzerland, and Zimbabwe, while reaching number nine on the US Billboard Hot 100. It remains one of Pet Shop Boys' most popular songs with 40 million streams in the UK.

== Background ==
"It's a Sin" was written in 1982 at Ray Roberts' studio in Camden, where Lowe and Tennant worked on songs in their early years. Their original demo was one of the songs Tennant brought to his meeting with New York record producer Bobby Orlando. Pet Shop Boys made another demo with Orlando in 1984, but it was never released. The song's basic structure from the 1984 demo remained intact in the 1987 version, although the released production is far more dramatic.

== Writing and inspiration ==
Tennant came up with the phrase "It's a sin" when he heard Lowe play a piece of music that sounded to him like a hymn. In the lyrics, he describes some impressions he took from his time at the Catholic St Cuthbert's Grammar School in Newcastle upon Tyne, in particular the teaching that sex is a sin except within marriage for the purpose of procreation. Tennant has said that the song was not intended to be serious:

People took it really seriously; the song was written in about 15 minutes, and was intended as a camp joke and it wasn't something I consciously took very seriously—sometimes I wonder if there was more to it than I thought at the time—but the local parish priest in Newcastle delivered a sermon on it, and reflected on how the Church changed from the promise of a ghastly hell to the message of love.

In the coda, Tennant recites a part of the Confiteor in Latin, which translated into English is "I confess to almighty God, and to you, my brothers, that I have sinned exceedingly in thought, word, act and omission, through my fault, through my fault, through my most grievous fault".

"It's a Sin" is in the key of C minor; the music for the bridge ("Father forgive me...") was taken from another song of theirs written in E-flat minor. In Tennant's words, "'It's a Sin', at its heart, is a heavy metal record. There is a huge link between hi-NRG music and heavy metal: the urgency, the chords, the slightly histrionic melody." The dramatic, overblown production style of the song, loaded with synthesizers, orchestra hits and bookended by a non sequitur sample of a NASA countdown, has come to exemplify the most theatrical extremes of the Pet Shop Boys' musical style.

== Recording ==
Julian Mendelsohn was the primary producer of "It's a Sin". (Note: In the liner notes of Actually: Further Listening 1987–1988 (2001), Tennant said they had considered using the Stock Aitken Waterman production team for "It's a Sin" but Pete Waterman didn't like the song; Tennant has since said he does not recall that happening.) He had been selected to co-produce Actually based on his work on the previous Pet Shop Boys single "Suburbia".

To add ambience to the track, Mendelsohn went with the duo to Brompton Oratory, a Catholic church in London, to record background sounds that can be heard during the bridge. At Westminster Cathedral, they recorded a sung Mass that happened to be in the right key, C minor; the amen response is heard at the end of the song. Keyboard programmer Andy Richards used a Fairlight to create the choir sound that opens the track.

After Mendelsohn moved on to another project, Pet Shop Boys decided they weren't satisfied with the end result, particularly the vocals. They asked Stephen Hague, the producer of Please (1986), to do another mix, which was the version used on the album and as the single. Mendelsohn commented that although he thought his version had better sound and dynamics, Hague's version was more interesting and the track benefitted from his "fresh ears."

== Release ==
The first single from Actually was originally slated to be "Heart", but Pet Shop Boys manager Tom Watkins advised them that EMI considered "It's a Sin" to be the most commercial option. "It's a Sin" preceded the album's September release on 15 June 1987 and became the Pet Shop Boys' second number one hit in the UK after "West End Girls". It held the top spot for three weeks during its six weeks in the top 10, and it was the nation's eighth best-selling single of 1987.

"It's a Sin" has sold at least 500,000 copies in the UK and has been certified Platinum by BPI with streaming figures included. With 40 million streams as of May 2024, it is the duo's third most streamed song in the UK. It received a boost of nearly 250% in sales and streams after the 2021 premiere of It's a Sin, a television series about the AIDS crisis of the 1980s that was named after the song.

"It's a Sin" was a bestseller across Europe, reaching number two on the European Hot 100 Singles chart in 1987. It was number one in Austria, Denmark, Finland, West Germany, Ireland, Luxembourg, Norway, Poland, Portugal, Spain, Sweden, and Switzerland, and in the top 3 in Belgium, Greece, Italy, and the Netherlands. The song also reached number one in Israel, South Africa and Zimbabwe and the top 10 in Canada, the United States, Australia, and New Zealand (see Charts).

A 12-inch single of "It's a Sin" had a remix by Ian Levine, and another featured a Disco Mix by Stephen Hague, which is included on the reissue Actually: Further Listening 1987–1988. A US 12-inch edition included the Hague and Levine remixes along with a Vocal Mix and Dub Mix by Stock Aitken Waterman engineer Phil Harding.

=== Artwork ===
The cover photo for the single (pictured) was taken by Eric Watson in the unused sacristy of Christ Church, Spitalfields. Tennant compared the image to the painting Ennui by Walter Sickert, depicting a couple looking bored and detached in a dimly lit room.

== Critical reception ==
In a review published in Smash Hits, Tom Hibbert wrote that "It's a Sin" starts with "an enormous clap of thunder, horns winking in the distance and then an absolute huge slab of European disco drama", noted that it sounds like a song by Princess Stéphanie of Monaco and uses the same notes as Cat Stevens' "Wild World". Billboard deemed it "a lively and commercial hi-NRG track", and Jerry Smith of Music Week called it "a slick new track, given their characteristic epic high-energy production, and sure to receive media overkill in the next few weeks".

== Music video ==
Directed by Derek Jarman, the "It's a Sin" video marked the experimental director's first of several collaborations with the band. It extended the lyrical themes of the song by showing Tennant under arrest by an inquisition with Lowe as his jailer and Ron Moody in the role of his judge, interspersed with brief clips of personifications of the seven deadly sins.

== Live performances ==
Pet Shop Boys played "It's a Sin" at a benefit opposing the anti-homosexuality law Section 28 at the Piccadilly Theatre on 5 June 1988. "It's a Sin" remains a concert staple, being one of only two songs (alongside "West End Girls") that has been played during every Pet Shop Boys tour. They have performed the song combined with Gloria Gaynor's "I Will Survive" at certain concerts, including the 1994 Discovery Tour accompanied by singer Katie Kissoon, and at their 1997 Savoy Theatre residency and the 2000 Glastonbury Festival with Sylvia Mason-James.

== Controversy ==
=== Response from St. Cuthbert's ===
After "It's a Sin" was released, the Newcastle Evening Chronicle published a front-page article calling the song "a direct attack on the religious values preached by the teachers and priests" at the school Tennant had attended. An unnamed spokesman for St. Cuthbert's Grammar School called it "a gross misrepresentation of life at the school and the Catholic faith", and an anonymous staff member, who claimed to have taught Tennant, said:

It is very unfortunate that Neil has painted this distorted picture of his school days and the things he was taught. It is very hurtful. It is a long time since he has been here and there have been a lot of changes since then in the Church. But even back in the Sixties when he came here we were quite open and forward-thinking. It certainly wasn't all hellfire and damnation.

In return, Tennant told Smash Hits that the article was embarrassing for his parents, who still lived in Newcastle, and that it was cowardly for school staff to speak anonymously about a former pupil.

=== Plagiarism accusation ===
At the time of the single's release, British DJ Jonathan King accused the Pet Shop Boys of plagiarising the melody for "It's a Sin" from Cat Stevens' 1971 song "Wild World". He made the claims in The Sun newspaper, for which he wrote a regular column during the 1980s. King went so far as to release his own cover version of "Wild World" as a single, using a similar musical arrangement to "It's a Sin", in an effort to demonstrate his claims. The single flopped and the Pet Shop Boys sued King, eventually winning out-of-court damages, which were donated to Jefferiss Research Trust to support the study of sexually transmitted diseases.

== Track listings ==
- 7": Parlophone / R 6158 (UK)
1. "It's a Sin" – 4:59
2. "You Know Where You Went Wrong" – 5:51
- 12": Parlophone / 12R 6158 (UK)
1. "It's a Sin" (Disco Mix) – 7:39
2. "You Know Where You Went Wrong" – 5:51
3. "It's a Sin" (7" version) – 4:59
- CD: Parlophone / CDR 6158 (UK)
1. "It's a Sin" (7" version) – 4:59
2. "You Know Where You Went Wrong" – 5:51
3. "It's a Sin" (Disco Mix) – 7:39
- 12": Parlophone / 12RX 6158 (UK)
1. "It's a Sin" (Remix) (Ian Levine) – 8:15
2. "You Know Where You Went Wrong" (Rough Mix) – 6:38
- 12": EMI-Manhattan / V-19256 (US)
1. "It's a Sin" (Phil Harding Latin Vocal Mix) (aka Miami Mix) – 9:14
2. "It's a Sin" (Phil Harding Latin Dub Mix) – 4:20
3. "It's a Sin" (Remix) (Ian Levine) – 8:15
4. "It's a Sin" (Disco Mix) – 7:39
5. "You Know Where You Went Wrong" – 5:51

== Personnel ==
Credits adapted from the liner notes for Actually: Further Listening 1987–1988 and "It's a Sin".

Pet Shop Boys

- Chris Lowe
- Neil Tennant

Additional musicians

- Andy Richards – Fairlight programming

Technical personnel

- Julian Mendelsohn – production, engineering
- Stephen Hague – mixing, additional production
- David Jacob – mix engineering

Artwork

- Mark Farrow and Pet Shop Boys – design
- Eric Watson – photography

== Charts ==
=== Weekly charts ===
Weekly chart performance for "It's a Sin"
Chart (1987)	Peak position
Australia (Australian Music Report)	10
Austria (Ö3 Austria Top 40)	1
Belgium (Ultratop 50 Flanders)	2
Canada Top Singles (RPM)	8
Canada (The Record)	4
Denmark (IFPI)	1
Europe (European Hot 100 Singles)	2
Finland (Suomen virallinen lista)	1
France (SNEP)	12
Greece (IFPI)	3
Ireland (IRMA)	1
Italy (Musica e dischi)	3
Japan (Oricon)	64
Luxembourg (Radio Luxembourg)	1
Netherlands (Dutch Top 40)	3
Netherlands (Single Top 100)	3
New Zealand (Recorded Music NZ)	8
Norway (VG-lista)	1
Portugal (AFP)	1
Quebec (ADISQ)	4
South Africa (Springbok Radio)	1
Spain (AFYVE)	1
Sweden (Sverigetopplistan)	1
Switzerland (Schweizer Hitparade)	1
UK Singles (Official Charts)	1
US Billboard Hot 100	9
US Dance Club Songs (Billboard)	3
US Dance Singles Sales (Billboard)	18
US Cash Box Top 100 Singles	12
West Germany (GfK)	1
Zimbabwe (ZIMA)	1

=== Year-end charts ===
Year-end chart performance for "It's a Sin"
Chart (1987)	Position
Australia (Australian Music Report)	50
Austria (Ö3 Austria Top 40)	4
Belgium (Ultratop 50 Flanders)	28
Canada Top Singles (RPM)	57
Denmark (IFPI)	8
Europe (European Hot 100 Singles)	5
Netherlands (Dutch Top 40)	39
Netherlands (Single Top 100)	27
South Africa (Springbok Radio)	18
Spain (AFYVE)	8
Switzerland (Schweizer Hitparade)	5
UK Singles (Gallup)	8
US Dance Club Play (Billboard)	34
West Germany (Media Control)	3

1985–1989 chart performance for "It's a Sin"
Chart (1985–1989)	Position
Europe (European Hot 100 Singles)	83

== Certifications and sales ==
Certifications and sales for "It's a Sin"
Region	Certification	Certified units/sales
Austria (IFPI Austria)	Gold	50,000^{*}
Finland	—	6,311
Portugal (AFP)	Gold	30,000
Spain (Promusicae)	Gold	25,000^{^}
Sweden (GLF)	Platinum	50,000^{^}
United Kingdom (BPI) 1987 release	Silver	500,000
United Kingdom (BPI) 2005 release	Platinum	600,000^{‡}
^{*} Sales figures based on certification alone.^{^} Shipments figures based on certification alone.^{‡} Sales+streaming figures based on certification alone.

== Cover versions ==
=== Years & Years version ===
"It's a Sin"

Single by Years & Years
- Released: 22 January 2021
- Length: 3:12
- Label: Polydor; Universal
- Songwriters: Neil Tennant; Chris Lowe
- Producer: Mark Ralph

Years & Years singles chronology
"Dreamland" (2020)	"It's a Sin" (2021)	"Starstruck" (2021)

On 22 January 2021, British electronic group Years & Years covered the song to coincide with the release of the Channel 4 series It's a Sin, which stars frontman Olly Alexander in the lead role. The cover was produced by Mark Ralph, with part of the proceeds going to the George House Trust. The band had previously collaborated with the Pet Shop Boys on the 2019 single "Dreamland", and Alexander previewed his version for Neil Tennant prior to its release. A slowed-down version of the song with only piano accompaniment, the cover is in C minor at a tempo of 126 beats per minute. Pet Shop Boys praised the cover, calling it "beautiful". A music video was released, consisting of clips from "It's a Sin". Alexander performed the song as part of the setlist for his 2022 Night Call Tour.

=== Elton John and Years and Years version ===
"It's a Sin"

Single by Elton John and Years & Years

from the album The Lockdown Sessions
- Released: 11 May 2021
- Genre: Synth-pop
- Length: 4:44
- Label: EMI; Mercury
- Songwriters: Neil Tennant; Chris Lowe
- Producers: Stuart Price; Pet Shop Boys

Elton John singles chronology
"Chosen Family" (2021)	"It's a Sin" (2021)	"Cold Heart (Pnau remix)" (2021)

A pre-recorded performance of the song by English musicians Elton John and Years & Years aired as part of the 2021 Brit Awards on 11 May 2021. Pet Shop Boys were scheduled to be a part of the performance, but were unable to do so due to a "contractual issue". The duet started as a slower piano track before transitioning into synth-pop with accompanying backup dancers and drag queens. A studio recording of the collaboration, produced by Stuart Price and the Pet Shop Boys, was released following the performance, with proceeds going to the Elton John AIDS Foundation. "It's a Sin" debuted at number 57 on the UK Singles Chart and at the top of The Official Big Top 40.

=== Other versions ===
- Hong Kong singer Danny Chan covered the song on his 1987 album Dream Person.
- Gamma Ray covered the song for their 1999 album Power Plant.
- Canadian/American singer Paul Anka covered the song as a slow jazz swing rendition on his 2005 album Rock Swings.
- American queer pop punk band Pansy Division covered the song on their 2016 album Quite Contrary.
- Swedish rock band Ghost released a cover of the song on deluxe editions of the 2018 album Prequelle. This version was used in the official gameplay trailer for Lords of the Fallen II (2026). The band released the song as a single on January 16, 2026.
- Jonathan Davis, lead singer of Korn covered the song for the soundtrack of the 2021 TV Series Paradise City.
