= Opportunities (Let's Make Lots of Money) =

1986 single by Pet Shop Boys

Single by Pet Shop Boys
- B-side: "In the Night"
- Released: 1 July 1985
- Genre: Synth-pop
- Length: 3:45 (7" single version); 6:44 (12" mix)
- Label: Parlophone
- Songwriters: Neil Tennant; Chris Lowe
- Producers: J. J. Jeczalik; Nicholas Froome

Pet Shop Boys singles chronology
"One More Chance" (1984)	"Opportunities (Let's Make Lots of Money)" (1985)	"West End Girls" (1985)

Music video
- "Opportunities (Let's Make Lots of Money)" (Original Version) on YouTube

"Opportunities (Let's Make Lots of Money)"
- Second release cover

Single by Pet Shop Boys

from the album Please
- B-side: "Was That What It Was?"
- Released: 19 May 1986
- Genre: Synth-pop
- Length: 3:44 (album version); 3:36 (7" edit version)
- Label: Parlophone
- Songwriters: Neil Tennant; Chris Lowe
- Producer: Stephen Hague

Pet Shop Boys singles chronology
"Love Comes Quickly" (1986)	"Opportunities (Let's Make Lots of Money)" (1986)	"Suburbia" (1986)

Music video
- "Opportunities (Let's Make Lots of Money)" (Version 2) on YouTube

"Opportunities (Let's Make Lots of Money)" is a song by English synth-pop duo Pet Shop Boys from their debut studio album, Please (1986). It was released as a single in 1985 and re-recorded and reissued in 1986, gaining greater popularity in both the United Kingdom and United States with its second release, reaching number 11 on the UK Singles Chart and number 10 on the US Billboard Hot 100. After the song was featured in a Super Bowl ad in February 2021, it re-entered the charts, claiming the number one spot on Billboard's Dance/Electronic Digital Song Sales.

== Background ==
"Opportunities (Let's Make Lots of Money)" was written during the Pet Shop Boys' formative years, in 1983. According to Neil Tennant, the main lyrical concept came while in a recording studio in Camden Town when Chris Lowe asked him to make up a lyric based around the line "Let's make lots of money".

=== Composition ===
The lyrics describe, in Tennant's words, "two losers". The song is written from the perspective of a man who describes himself as being intellectual and educated. The lyrics are addressed towards another character, identified as having "looks" and "brawn", and who is invited to join the song's protagonist in a scheme to "make lots of money".

Tennant has made it clear that the schemes are doomed to failure. The protagonist's claimed accreditations, a PhD in mathematics from the Sorbonne and knowledge of computer programming, are conceited fabrications. The punchline of the song is that "the people in it are not going to make any money".

The lyrics' meaning has been taken at face value by some listeners, who view it as a materialistic anthem. The satirical interpretation, on the other hand, cemented the Pet Shop Boys' reputation as ironists for many, to the band's chagrin since often their more sincere songs are ignored as a result.

A notable change between the original and re-recorded versions of "Opportunities" is the omission of the spoken outro, "All the love that we had / And the love that we hide / Who will bury us / When we die?" According to Tennant, the lyrics were removed from the second version of the song as the duo feared the passage would be construed as "too pretentious". The first two lines of the outro, however, are sung within the lyrics of "Why Don't We Live Together?" from the Please album.

== Release ==
The first version of the song, recorded with the duo's first producer, Bobby Orlando, was not released. Upon signing with record label Parlophone, they re-recorded the song with J. J. Jeczalik (of Art of Noise) and Nicholas Froome. Released as a single in July 1985, this version charted at number 116 in the UK, to be exceedingly outdone by the number-one spectacle of the subsequent release of "West End Girls" in multiple countries. In Los Angeles, trend-setting Modern Rock station KROQ-FM 106.7 played the original version of "Opportunities," as heard in a November 1985 recording of the station on a Saturday evening with notable host Richard Blade.

A new single version for the duo's debut album, Please, was mixed with reprogramming done by producer Stephen Hague and re-recorded vocals from Tennant. The second release of "Opportunities", following the album's release, resulted in better chart performance. It is the only single from the band to chart higher in the US than the UK, becoming the duo's second top 10 single in the US, peaking at number 10, and just missing out at number 11 in the UK. In Australia, the first version was the one to chart (although outside the top 40).

Please also included a brief, cacophonic track titled "Opportunities (Reprise)", which was the original middle section to the song proper before it was edited out.

For the 1985 release, 12-inch remixes were produced by Ron Dean Miller of Nuance, while those for the 1986 release were produced by noted 1980s producer Shep Pettibone. Some of Miller's overdubs went on to be incorporated into the 1986 single version. The 1986 7" single version bears the following production credit: "Original Production by J.J. Jeczalik & Nicholas Froome; New York overdubs by Ron Dean Miller; Remix and Additional Production by Stephen Hague." Miller is also credited on the album track in the liner notes for Please.

The original single version of "Opportunities" was unavailable on compact disc until the 1998 U.S.-only Essential compilation album, and was subsequently published in a longer version on the 2-disc Please: Further Listening 1984–1986.

=== Artwork ===
The cover of the 1985 single was created by XL Design with portraits of the duo photographed by Eric Watson. The front featured Tennant in a suit and tie with a dollar sign on his lapel; the back shows Lowe in a peaked cap, leather jacket, and gold chain. A limited edition 12-inch remix single (12RA6097) had 6-inch picture labels and a black die-cut sleeve with spot-varnish lettering.

The 1986 single cover was designed by Mark Farrow with no images, only typography. The gold lettering on a silver background represents money.

=== "In the Night" ===
The B-side of the 1985 release, "In the Night", is about the subculture known as the Zazous, which appeared in France during the German occupation of France in World War II; concerned with fashion and music, and allied with neither the Nazis and Vichy France nor the French Resistance, they were distrusted by both sides. Tennant, having read about the movement in a book by David Pryce-Jones, asks, in the song, the question of whether this apathy essentially amounted to collaborationism.

The Arthur Baker remix from Disco became the opening theme music of the BBC fashion programme The Clothes Show from the second series in 1987 (the original 1986 theme was Five Star's "Find the Time (Shep Pettibone Remix)"). This continued for a decade until 1995 saw a fully instrumental re-recording of the song, "In the Night '95", for the purpose of replacing the old theme.

== Music videos ==
=== First version ===
The music video for the first single release was directed by Eric Watson and Andy Morahan. A Cadillac stands in an underground car park, the headlights switching on by themselves as Lowe walks away from it. The cover of a ground-level service hatch in front of the car vanishes, leaving a rectangular hole in which Tennant materialises, standing with only his head and shoulders visible. He is dressed in a hat, eyeglasses, and a coat by British fashion designer Stephen Linard with a dollar-sign pin on the lapel. As he sings amid occasional washes of steam from the car, his face begins to jitter and his neck inflates in similar fashion to a frog. Lowe appears at intervals, wearing blue jeans and a leather jacket and standing/walking around the garage. At the end of the video, Tennant's body disintegrates to dust within his suit, leaving it upright on a coat hanger and his hat on the pavement. The suit disappears as Lowe drives away in the car.

In designing Tennant's appearance, Watson was partly inspired by the character of the preacher played by Harry Dean Stanton in the film Wise Blood (1979), adapted from the novel of the same title by Flannery O'Connor.

=== Second version ===
For the re-release, Polish director Zbigniew Rybczyński was recruited. Tennant wears a suit, hat, and white gloves, while Lowe is dressed as a manual labourer in a dirty shirt, red baseball cap, and jeans with a pair of work gloves stuffed in the back pocket. As Tennant sings, paper money showers onto him and Lowe from above and a background of city skylines and clouds scrolls past, rendered as neon outlines. Duplicates of the two appear repeatedly, passing objects back and forth that represent their characters' respective statuses, such as a brick, sledgehammer, briefcase, stack of books, and top hat.

== Usage in other media ==
The song was the opening theme for the American reality television series Beauty and the Geek which premiered in 2005, running for 5 seasons.

"Opportunities (Let's Make Lots of Money)" was used in a commercial for Allstate in 2021 that aired during Super Bowl LV. In the weeks following the Super Bowl, the ad was in heavy rotation and triggered a wave of renewed interest in the Pet Shop Boys. The song re-entered the US charts after 35 years on Billboard's Dance/Electronic Digital Song Sales chart at number five. By the last week of February it had surged to number one. The song stayed atop the chart for four straight weeks and climbed back to the top spot on 17 April, for a total of five weeks at number one. The song also reached number 12 on the Billboard Dance/Electronic Songs chart and number 25 on the Digital Songs chart. The increase in interest also affected other Pet Shop Boys songs, with "West End Girls" vaulting to number six on the Dance/Electronic Digital Songs chart.

== Track listings ==
=== 7" (UK) (1985 release) (Parlophone R6097) ===
- A. "Opportunities (Let's Make Lots of Money)" – 3:45
- B. "In the Night" – 4:50

=== 12" #1 (UK) (1985 release) (Parlophone 12R6097) ===
- A. "Opportunities (Let's Make Lots of Money)" (Dance Mix) – 6:44
- B. "In the Night" – 4:50

=== 12" #2 (UK) (1985 release) (Parlophone 12RA6097) ===
- A. "Opportunities (Let's Make Lots of Money)" (Version Latina) – 5:29
- B1. "Opportunities" (Dub for Money) – 4:54
- B2. "In the Night" – 4:50

=== 7" (UK) (1986 release) (Parlophone R6129) ===
- A. "Opportunities (Let's Make Lots of Money)" – 3:36
- B. "Was That What It Was?" – 5:18

=== 12" (UK) (1986 release) Parlophone (12R6129) ===
- A1. "Opportunities (Let's Make Lots of Money)" (Shep Pettibone Mastermix) – 7:18
- A2. "Opportunities" (Reprise) – 4:27
- B1. "Opportunities" (Original Dance Mix) – 6:45
- B2. "Was That What It Was?" – 5:18

== Charts ==
=== Weekly charts ===
Weekly chart performance for "Opportunities (Let's Make Lots of Money)" (original release)
Chart (1985–1986)	Peak position
Australia (Kent Music Report)	63
UK Singles (OCC)	116

Weekly chart performance for "Opportunities (Let's Make Lots of Money)" (reissue)
Chart (1986–1987)	Peak position
Canada Top Singles (RPM)	22
Europe (European Hot 100 Singles)	29
Ireland (IRMA)	14
Luxembourg (Radio Luxembourg)	10
Netherlands (Dutch Top 40)	23
Netherlands (Single Top 100)	30
New Zealand (Recorded Music NZ)	2
Quebec (ADISQ)	17
Spain (AFYVE)	14
UK Singles (Official Charts)	11
US Billboard Hot 100	10
US Dance Club Songs (Billboard)	3
US Dance Singles Sales (Billboard)	16
US Cash Box Top 100	9
West Germany (GfK)	25

2021 weekly chart performance for "Opportunities (Let's Make Lots of Money)"
Chart (2021)	Peak position
US Dance/Electronic Digital Song Sales (Billboard)	1
US Digital Song Sales (Billboard)	25
US Hot Dance/Electronic Songs (Billboard)	12

=== Year-end charts ===
1986 year-end chart performance for "Opportunities (Let's Make Lots of Money)" (reissue)
Chart (1986)	Position
New Zealand (RIANZ)	30
US Dance/Disco Club Play (Billboard)	47
US Cash Box Top 100 Singles	88

2021 year-end chart performance for "Opportunities (Let's Make Lots of Money)" (reissue)
Chart (2021)	Position
US Hot Dance/Electronic Songs (Billboard)	56
