= Essential (Pet Shop Boys album) =

Compilation album by Pet Shop Boys
- Released: 31 March 1998
- Recorded: 1985–1990
- Genre: Electropop
- Label: EMI/Capitol
- Producer: Harold Faltermeyer; Nicholas Froome; Stephen Hague; Trevor Horn; David Jacobs; J. J. Jeczalik; Lewis Martineé; Pet Shop Boys

Pet Shop Boys chronology
Bilingual (1996)	Essential (1998)	Nightlife (1999)

Professional ratings
Review scores
Source	Rating
Allmusic	3/5 stars
Pitchfork	4.2/10

Essential is a 1998 compilation album by English synth-pop duo Pet Shop Boys, released as a limited edition in the United States by EMI/Capitol and in Japan by Toshiba/EMI. Produced for only six months, early promotional versions of the album had the title Early, as the tracks featured were part of Pet Shop Boys' early catalogue. The album contained remixes as well as album tracks and B-sides. The CD booklet contains an essay written by music journalist and Pet Shop Boys biographer Chris Heath.

While several of the selections had not been available on compact disc prior to its original release, as of 2018, it remains the only official CD appearance of the 7" version of "That's My Impression" (all other reissues and compilations using the "Disco" mix.)

== Track listing ==
No.	Title	Writer(s)	Producer(s)	Length
1.	"Domino Dancing" (Alternative version)	Neil Tennant, Chris Lowe	Lewis Martineé, Pet Shop Boys	4:42
2.	"West End Girls" (Dance Mix)	Neil Tennant, Chris Lowe	Stephen Hague	6:29
3.	"Opportunities (Let's Make Lots of Money)" (1985 7" version)	Neil Tennant, Chris Lowe	J. J. Jeczalik, Nicholas Froome	3:48
4.	"Paninaro" (1986 7" version)	Neil Tennant, Chris Lowe	Pet Shop Boys	4:40
5.	"That's My Impression" (7" version)	Neil Tennant, Chris Lowe	Pet Shop Boys	4:48
6.	"We All Feel Better in the Dark" (Extended Mix)	Neil Tennant, Chris Lowe	Pet Shop Boys	6:47
7.	"It Couldn't Happen Here" (LP version)	Neil Tennant, Chris Lowe, Ennio Morricone	Pet Shop Boys, David Jacobs	5:20
8.	"It's Alright" (7" version)	Sterling Void	Trevor Horn	4:20
9.	"Left to My Own Devices" (7" version)	Neil Tennant, Chris Lowe	Trevor Horn, Stephen Lipson	4:46
10.	"In the Night" (Remix)	Neil Tennant, Chris Lowe	Pet Shop Boys	6:28
11.	"Two Divided by Zero" (LP version)	Neil Tennant, Bobby Orlando	Stephen Hague	3:36
12.	"Love Comes Quickly" (Dance Mix)	Neil Tennant, Chris Lowe, Stephen Hague	Stephen Hague	6:48
13.	"Being Boring" (Extended version)	Neil Tennant, Chris Lowe	Pet Shop Boys, Harold Faltermeyer	10:40

== Personnel ==
- Evren Göknar - Mastering Engineer

== Certifications ==
Region	Certification	Certified units/sales
United States	—	39,000
