= Please (Pet Shop Boys album) =

- Cover art for the original CD release.

Studio album by Pet Shop Boys
- Released: 24 March 1986
- Recorded: August 1985 (Note: "West End Girls"); November 1985 – January 1986
- Studio: Advision (London)
- Genres: Synth-pop; dance-pop; disco
- Length: 42:50
- Label: Parlophone
- Producer: Stephen Hague

Pet Shop Boys chronology
Please (1986)	Disco (1986)

Singles from Please
- 1. "West End Girls" Released: 28 October 1985; 2. "Love Comes Quickly" Released: 24 February 1986; 3. "Opportunities (Let's Make Lots of Money)" Released: 19 May 1986; 4. "Suburbia" Released: 22 September 1986

Please is the debut studio album by English synth-pop duo Pet Shop Boys, released on 24 March 1986 by Parlophone in the United Kingdom and by EMI America Records in the United States. According to the duo, the album's title was chosen so that people could go into a record shop and say "Can I have the Pet Shop Boys album, please?" Please featured the number one hit "West End Girls" and nine other songs, including the singles "Opportunities (Let's Make Lots of Money)", "Love Comes Quickly", and "Suburbia".

== Background and composition ==
Pet Shop Boys signed with Parlophone, a subsidiary of EMI Records, in March 1985. By that time, Chris Lowe and Neil Tennant had been writing songs together for over three years. Their music was influenced by Italian disco, the emerging American hip-hop scene, and American producer Bobby Orlando's lo-fi electronic dance music. The duo had recorded some of their material with Orlando, including "West End Girls", which had been released as an unsuccessful single in 1984. Lyrically, the songs were inspired by their life in London at the time, with lyricist Tennant assuming different characters and occasionally writing satirical songs, such as "Opportunities (Let's Make Lots of Money)".

== Recording ==
"Opportunities" was the first single for their Parlophone deal. They had written the song in 1983 and had subsequently worked on it with Orlando but never released it. Pet Shop Boys picked J. J. Jeczalik of Art of Noise as producer. The recording session took three weeks and cost £40,000. When the single was released in July 1985, it only reached 116 on the UK Singles Chart.

For their debut album, Pet Shop Boys wanted to work with Stephen Hague, the producer of Malcolm McLaren's "Madame Butterfly" and The World's Famous Supreme Team's "Hey DJ". Their record company initially wanted them to use Stock Aitken Waterman, but Pet Shop Boys were allowed to record "West End Girls" with Hague as a trial. Hague suggested slowing the song down and making it moodier, with more focus on the story and a filmic intro of street sounds. "West End Girls" was released in October, and the single climbed to the top of charts as they went on to record the rest of the album.

Please was made in 10 weeks, between November 1985 and January 1986, at Advision Studios in London. They sequenced the songs to form a loose storyline: "They run away in the first song ["Two Divided by Zero"], they arrive in the city ("West End Girls"), they want to make money ("Opportunities"), they fall in love ("Love Comes Quickly"), move to suburbia ("Suburbia"), go out clubbing ("Tonight Is Forever"), there's violence in the city ("Violence") and casual sex ("I Want a Lover"), someone tries to pick up a boy ("Later Tonight")". The sequence ends with "Why Don't We Live Together?"

"Two Divided by Zero", dating back to 1983, was co-written by Tennant and Bobby Orlando, who wrote the backing track; it is the only Pet Shop Boys song, excluding cover versions, for which Lowe does not share a songwriting credit. (Note: "Later Tonight" was credited solely to Tennant on the original release of Please, but Lowe is co-credited on subsequent releases. Lowe was also not originally credited on the Bobby Orlando single of "One More Chance", but he added material to the album version and is credited on Actually.) For the album version, Hague used a similar arrangement but gave it a bigger sound that conveys the sense of excitement of running away. The track features the voice of a talking calculator that Tennant bought in New York as a Christmas present for his father.

Hague shares a songwriting credit with the duo on "Love Comes Quickly" for coming up with the chord changes of the middle eight. The song was released as a single in February 1986 and just made the top 20 at number 19. "Opportunities" was reworked following the disappointing chart performance of its initial release. They did not have time to record a new version, but Hague used elements from the single as well as the 12-inch mix by Ron Dean Miller, and re-recorded the vocals. A portion of the original single, featuring a party scene, was used as the sixth track on the album, titled "Opportunities (reprise)". "Opportunities" was re-released as a single in May 1986, and reached number 11 on the UK Singles Chart and number 10 on the US Billboard Hot 100.

Hague decided to record "Later Tonight" live in the studio, with Tennant singing accompanied by Lowe on the piano. Lowe played trombone on "I Want a Lover", originally recorded with Blue Weaver prior to the album sessions. "Why Don't We Live Together?" was also recorded earlier in 1985 with Ron Dean Miller and was reworked by Hague with new drum programming. "Suburbia" was the last song completed for Please; due to time constraints, the album version is a polished version of the Pet Shop Boys' demo. When it was released as a single in September 1986, "Suburbia" was redone with producer Julian Mendelsohn and became the Pet Shop Boys' second top 10 hit in the UK.

== Release ==
Please was released on 24 March 1986 and debuted at number three on the UK Albums Chart. In the United States, Please is Pet Shop Boys' highest-charting album, reaching number seven on the Billboard 200, and it is their only record to be certified platinum by the RIAA with over one million sales.

Please was re-released in 2001 (as were most of the duo's studio albums up to that point) as Please: Further Listening 1984–1986. The re-released version was digitally remastered and came with a second disc of B-sides and previously unreleased material from around the time of the album's original release. A remastered single-disc edition of Please, containing only the 11 original tracks, was released in 2009. In 2018, a newly remastered edition of Please: Further Listening 1984–1986 was released, with the same contents as the 2001 edition.

"Violence" was later re-recorded by the Pet Shop Boys for a charity concert at the Haçienda nightclub in 1992. This version, known as the 'Haçienda version', was released as one of the B-sides to "I Wouldn't Normally Do This Kind of Thing" and was then made available on the B-sides album Alternative and on Very: Further Listening 1992–1994.

"Tonight Is Forever" was later covered by Liza Minnelli on the Pet Shop Boys-produced album Results.

=== Artwork ===
For their first album cover, Pet Shop Boys manager Tom Watkins presented them with a fold-out latticework model, but they thought it was too complicated. In reaction, Mark Farrow created a minimalist white cover with a tiny photo of the duo in the center with their name and the title in small type underneath. The photo, taken by Eric Watson, shows Lowe and Tennant with white towels on their shoulders and was chosen from existing images for the way it blended into the background. The inner sleeve had 98 more small images by Eric Watson, Paul Rider, John Stoddard, Joe Shutter, Ian Hooton, Chris Burscough, and Chris Lowe. Some international distributors made changes to the cover: EMI America redid the cover with the name on the top, and in France a cover with a larger picture was made.

== Critical reception ==
Professional ratings
Review scores
Source	Rating
AllMusic	4/5 stars
Christgau's Record Guide	A−
The Encyclopedia of Popular Music	4/5 stars
The Great Rock Discography	6/10
The Rolling Stone Album Guide	4/5 stars
Smash Hits	9/10
Sounds	2/5 stars
Spin Alternative Record Guide	8/10
Uncut	8/10

Please received a mix of reviews at the time of its release. In March 1986, Smash Hits reviewer Chris Heath gave the album a 9 out of 10 rating describing the content as "ten thoroughly catchy songs". Writing in 1986 for Billboard's "Dance Trax" column, Brian Chin described the album as an "amusingly complete compendium of recent dance music styles. It should be a long-running hit for clubs if the remixes keep coming." In The Village Voice, Robert Christgau highlighted the catchy tunes and "yearningly cynical lyrics" but stated that his favourite moments on the album are provided by sound effects–"sirens and breaking glass so skillfully integrated into the synthesized textures that at first I didn't notice they were there."

Eleanor Levy of Record Mirror gave Please 3.5 out of 5 stars in her review: "Clean and crisp, these Pet Shop Boys—creating layer upon glossy layer of traditional early Eighties electronic trickery… All fairly conventionally unconventional, really. A vague veneer of experimentation covering comfortable pop sounds". She added, "This is also a very accomplished debut album." In the same issue, Jim Reid called Please "a cool, self-possessed, some might say cold, record. It would sound very good on CD… It's an ambient record, a rather good record, but not a great record".

An article in the Los Angeles Times from May 1986 described a negative reaction by unspecified critics: "...many critics have been gunning for ["West End Girls"], attacking with their heavy artillery. Nor have they been very kind to the debut album, Please—loaded with disco material of course... The problem is that most critics regard disco (or dance music, as they call it now) as one-dimensional noise pollution." The Trouser Press Record Guide panned the album: "Please is a slick set of anonymous easy-listening disco tracks, brilliantly, soullessly produced (mostly by Stephen Hague), with ridiculous, overbearingly smug lyrics recited by Tennant… Ghastly, depressing and offensive."

Retrospectively, several reviewers have acknowledged the strength of the album as a starting point for the Pet Shop Boys' career. "The debut Pet Shop Boys album does what all good debut albums should do and established the aesthetic of the band which would endure right to the present day," according to Martyn Young in a 2020 Clash feature. The AllMusic review by Stephen Thomas Erlewine called Please "A collection of immaculately crafted and seamlessly produced synthesized dance-pop" that "sketches out the basic elements of the duo's sound." In 2011, Josh Freeman of The Quietus suggested, "perhaps, Please by Pet Shop Boys is the perfect first album. Although maybe not their best… Please is an assured and hugely successful (three million sales worldwide and counting) record containing some of their best-known songs. However, Please also acted as lift-off for Neil Tennant and Chris Lowe's creative wanderlust." In a 2009 review for the BBC, Ian Wade wrote: "Please really hasn't dated at all and should be the textbook example of how brilliant a pop debut could be."

== Track listing ==
All tracks are written by Neil Tennant and Chris Lowe, except where noted.

Side A
No.	Title	Writer(s)	Length
1.	"Two Divided by Zero"	Bobby Orlando; Tennant	3:35
2.	"West End Girls"		4:46
3.	"Opportunities (Let's Make Lots of Money)"		3:44
4.	"Love Comes Quickly"	Tennant; Lowe; Stephen Hague	4:19
5.	"Suburbia"		5:10
6.	"Opportunities" (reprise)		0:34
Total length:			22:08

Side B
No.	Title	Length
7.	"Tonight Is Forever"	4:33
8.	"Violence"	4:30
9.	"I Want a Lover"	4:06
10.	"Later Tonight"	2:49
11.	"Why Don't We Live Together?"	4:45
Total length:		20:42 (42:50)

Further Listening 1984–1986 (bonus disc)
No.	Title	Writer(s)	Length
1.	"A Man Could Get Arrested" (12-inch B-side; previously unreleased)		4:11
2.	"Opportunities" (full-length original 7-inch; previously unreleased)		4:36
3.	"In the Night"		4:51
4.	"Opportunities" (original 12-inch mix; previously unreleased on CD)		7:00
5.	"Why Don't We Live Together?" (original New York mix; previously unreleased)		5:14
6.	"West End Girls" (dance mix; previously unreleased on CD)		6:39
7.	"A Man Could Get Arrested" (7-inch B-side; previously unreleased on CD)		4:51
8.	"Love Comes Quickly" (dance mix)	Tennant; Lowe; Hague	6:50
9.	"That's My Impression" (disco mix)		5:19
10.	"Was That What It Was?"		5:17
11.	"Suburbia" (The Full Horror)		8:58
12.	"Jack the Lad"		4:32
13.	"Paninaro" (Italian remix)		8:38
Total length:			76:56

=== Notes ===
- On LP and cassette copies, "Opportunities" (Reprise) is sequenced as a hidden track at the end of side A, acting as the outro to "Suburbia".
- Track 4 on the Further Listening 1984–1986 bonus disc is a previously unreleased mix, different from the actual 12" version released in 1985 (dance mix) and which reappeared in 1986 (original dance mix).

== Personnel ==
Credits adapted from the liner notes of Please and Please: Further Listening 1984–1986

=== Pet Shop Boys ===
- Chris Lowe
- Neil Tennant

=== Additional musicians ===
- Andy Mackay – saxophone (track 4)
- Helena Springs – additional vocals (tracks 2, 8)
- Gary Barnacle – saxophone (Further Listening track 11)

=== Technical ===
- Stephen Hague – production
- David Jacob – engineering
- J. J. Jeczalik – production (original recording) (track 3, 6)
- Nicholas Froome – production (original recording) (track 3, 6)
- Ron Dean Miller – New York overdubs (track 3); production (original recording) (track 11)
- Pet Shop Boys – production (original recording) (track 9)
- Blue Weaver – production (original recording) (track 9)
- Tim Young – 2001 & 2018 remastering

=== Artwork ===
- Eric Watson – cover photograph, inner sleeve photographs
- Paul Rider, John Stoddart, Brian Aris, Joe Shutter, Ian Hooton, Chris Burscough – inner sleeve photographs
- Mark Farrow – sleeve design
- Pet Shop Boys – sleeve design

== Charts ==
=== Weekly charts ===
Weekly chart performance for Please
Chart (1986)	Peak position
Australian Albums (Kent Music Report)	10
Canada Top Albums/CDs (RPM)	3
European Albums (Music & Media)	18
Finnish Albums (Suomen virallinen lista)	4
German Albums (Offizielle Top 100)	38
Icelandic Albums (Tónlist)	8
Italian Albums (Musica e dischi)	21
New Zealand Albums (RMNZ)	2
Norwegian Albums (VG-lista)	13
Spanish Albums (AFYVE)	8
Swedish Albums (Sverigetopplistan)	21
Swiss Albums (Schweizer Hitparade)	20
UK Albums (Official Charts)	3
US Billboard 200	7

2018 weekly chart performance for Please
Chart (2018)	Peak position
Hungarian Albums (MAHASZ)	39

=== Year-end charts ===
Year-end chart performance for Please
Chart (1986)	Position
Australian Albums (Kent Music Report)	59
Canada Top Albums/CDs (RPM)	15
European Albums (Music & Media)	46
New Zealand Albums (RMNZ)	8
UK Albums (Gallup)	34
US Billboard 200	39

== Certifications and sales ==
Certifications and sales for Please
Region	Certification	Certified units/sales
Brazil	—	75,000
Canada (Music Canada)	Platinum	100,000^{^}
Hong Kong (IFPI Hong Kong)	Gold	10,000^{*}
New Zealand (RMNZ)	Platinum	15,000^{^}
United Kingdom (BPI)	Platinum	400,000
United States (RIAA)	Platinum	1,000,000^{^}
Summaries
Worldwide	—	3,000,000
^{*} Sales figures based on certification alone.^{^} Shipments figures based on certification alone.
