= Eric Watson (photographer) =

English photographer (1955–2012)

Eric Watson (9 September 1955 – 18 March 2012) was an English photographer.

Watson was born in Newcastle. He moved to London in 1974 and studied fine art at Hornsey Art College from 1977 to 1980, where Adam Ant was his contemporary. He became an assistant to the photographer Red Saunders in 1980 and soon branched out as a photographer in his own right, primarily in the pop music business. From 1981 to 1986, he was one of the main photographers for "Smash Hits" magazine where his friend Neil Tennant was the assistant editor.

When Tennant formed the Pet Shop Boys with Chris Lowe, Watson took the first photographs of them and was their main photographer and video director from 1984 to 1991.

The first video he directed was "Opportunities (Let's Make Lots of Money)" for the Pet Shop Boys in 1985, his co-director being Andy Morahan. He subsequently directed a series of Pet Shop Boys videos, including "Suburbia", "What Have I Done to Deserve This?", "Domino Dancing", "So Hard" and "DJ Culture".

Watson also directed videos for a number of other pop artists including Holly Johnson and Yaz before concentrating on TV commercials.

He exhibited his photographs at the Blue Gallery in London and in the "Icons of Pop" exhibition of 1999 at the National Portrait Gallery. His photographs of the Pet Shop Boys were displayed at the National Portrait Gallery in London in 2006.

In later years Watson worked as Head of Photography at Rye College located in Rye, East Sussex.

On 18 March 2012, Watson died after suffering a heart attack.
