= Mark Farrow =

British graphic designer (born 1960)

Mark Farrow RDI
- Born: 1960 (age 65–66)
- Known for: Graphic design
- Awards: Royal Designers for Industry (2009)
- Website: farrowdesign.com

Mark Farrow (born May 1960) is a British graphic designer known for his work with English music label Factory Records and Manchester nightclub The Haçienda. He has also done work for bands such as Pet Shop Boys and Spiritualized. In 2009, he was named a Royal Designer for Industry (RDI) by the Royal Society of Arts.

== Early life ==
Farrow attended art college for a short time but quit to work in a Manchester design studio. He also worked at The Discount Record Shop in Manchester's Underground Market. With the advent of punk rock, the shop was frequented by clientele like Ben Kelly and Peter Saville, both connected to Factory Records and The Haçienda nightclub.

== Design work ==
In 1982, after befriending groups as part of the Manchester scene, Farrow was given the chance to design the cover for the 7-inch single "Fairy Tales" by the Stockholm Monsters, a Factory release. Throughout the early 80s, he designed experimental sleeves and posters for both Factory and The Haçienda, which placed him at the forefront of contemporary music graphic design. After 1991, Farrow began working under the name of his studio, Farrow Design.

Farrow has had a longstanding creative partnership with Pet Shop Boys and other bands such as the space rock group Spiritualized. As the 12" vinyl went out of style, Farrow challenged contemporary notions of CD packaging. In the mid-90s, Farrow designed the cover for Everything Must Go (1996), the breakthrough album by the Manic Street Preachers. For Spiritualized's 1997 album Ladies and Gentlemen We Are Floating in Space, he used an authentic tablet blister-pack which contained the CDs and accompanying text. For their 2001 release Let it Come Down, he included a 3-D, vacuum-formed face as part of the cover. He has also worked with artists such as Kylie Minogue, Burt Bacharach, Calvin Harris, and Snow Patrol.

Farrow also works outside the music industry, for designers, photographers, publishers, and other industry projects. He has worked with Oliver Peyton on restaurants and bars, designed the cover of the 1999 Design and Art Direction annual, worked with SCP furniture on designing clocks, developed a packaging system for Levi's, collaborated with The Science Museum in London, and designed a yacht for Campers' Volvo Ocean Race.

His minimalist approach, and rigorous, precise attention to detail defines his aesthetic. He enjoys close, collaborative work.

== Awards ==
Farrow was named Designer of the Year in the Creative Review Peer Poll in 2004, voting him ‘the most important graphic designer working today’.

In 2009, by which time he had won nine Design and Art Direction Silver Awards, he was given the honour of Royal Designer for Industry (RDI) by the Royal Society of Arts.

Farrow also has four Grammy Award nominations, 10 Music Week CAD awards, and two Art Directors Club of Europe Gold Awards.
