= Discography: The Complete Singles Collection =

Greatest hits album by Pet Shop Boys
- Released: 4 November 1991
- Recorded: 1985–1991
- Genres: Synth-pop; dance-pop; disco
- Length: 76:24
- Label: Parlophone
- Producers: Brothers in Rhythm; Harold Faltermeyer; Stephen Hague; Trevor Horn; Stephen Lipson; Lewis A. Martineé; Julian Mendelsohn; Pet Shop Boys; Andy Richards

Pet Shop Boys chronology
Behaviour (1990)	Discography: The Complete Singles Collection (1991)	Very (1993)

Singles from Discography: The Complete Singles Collection
- 1. "DJ Culture" Released: 14 October 1991; 2. "Was It Worth It?" Released: 9 December 1991

Discography: The Complete Singles Collection is the first greatest hits album by English synth-pop duo Pet Shop Boys, released on 4 November 1991 by Parlophone.

== Composition ==
Discography collects all of the singles released by Pet Shop Boys up to 1991 except for "How Can You Expect to Be Taken Seriously?" 16 of the 18 tracks were singles, while the last two tracks ("DJ Culture" and "Was It Worth It?") are new songs recorded exclusively for this compilation. Discography also contains a non-album single: the duo's cover version of U2's song "Where the Streets Have No Name", which later in the song breaks into the chorus of Frankie Valli's "Can't Take My Eyes Off You". Although many of the album's songs were released in other forms, this compilation only features the seven-inch single versions.

Pet Shop Boys also released a companion video compilation, Videography, consisting of the music videos for each of the songs on Discography, arranged in a slightly different order. Additionally, the song "Was It Worth It?" was replaced with "How Can You Expect to Be Taken Seriously?", which was not on the audio version of the album, despite being a double A-side with "Where the Streets Have No Name (I Can't Take My Eyes off You)" (the exclusion being due to the constrictions of the CD's running time).

== Critical reception ==
Professional ratings
Review scores
Source	Rating
AllMusic	5/5 stars
Calgary Herald	A
The Encyclopedia of Popular Music	5/5 stars
Entertainment Weekly	A+
NME	10/10
Q	5/5 stars
The Rolling Stone Album Guide	5/5 stars
The Village Voice	A

Upon its release, Andrew Collins of NME praised the compilation as "sublime and clever pop music" and added that you "don't have to despise rock music in order to love it". He added, "These songs are rooted in a distinctly bourgeois variety of urban angst but just think how closer it all is to your life than 'Vienna' and all that New Romantic nonsense to which the PSBs are so clearly indebted." Simon Price of Melody Maker summarised, "Somehow the lush symphonic sweep of these singles seems deeply cinematic. Every song is a full-scale Panavision epic whose recurrent moods are regret, nostalgia, and above all, jealousy. If you want near-faultless shimmering, shuddering disco melodrama, nobody does it better."

== Track listing ==
All tracks are written by Neil Tennant and Chris Lowe, except where noted.

No.	Title	Writer(s)	Producer(s)	Length
1.	"West End Girls" (1985 7-inch version)		Stephen Hague	3:59
2.	"Love Comes Quickly"	Tennant; Lowe; Hague	Hague	4:17
3.	"Opportunities (Let's Make Lots of Money)" (1986 7-inch version)		J. J. Jeczalik^{[a]}; Nicholas Froome^{[a]}; Hague^{[b]}^{[c]}	3:36
4.	"Suburbia" (7-inch version)		Julian Mendelsohn	4:03
5.	"It's a Sin"		Mendelsohn; Hague^{[c]}	4:59
6.	"What Have I Done to Deserve This?"	Tennant; Lowe; Allee Willis	Hague	4:19
7.	"Rent" (7-inch version)		Mendelsohn	3:32
8.	"Always on My Mind" (7-inch version)	Wayne Carson Thompson; Mark James; Johnny Christopher	Mendelsohn; Pet Shop Boys; David Jacob^{[a]}	3:53
9.	"Heart" (7-inch version)		Andy Richards; Pet Shop Boys	4:16
10.	"Domino Dancing" (7-inch version)		Lewis A. Martineé; Pet Shop Boys^{[d]}	4:17
11.	"Left to My Own Devices" (7-inch version)		Trevor Horn; Stephen Lipson	4:46
12.	"It's Alright" (7-inch version)	Sterling Void	Horn	4:19
13.	"So Hard"		Pet Shop Boys; Harold Faltermeyer	3:58
14.	"Being Boring" (7-inch version)		Pet Shop Boys; Faltermeyer	4:50
15.	"Where the Streets Have No Name (I Can't Take My Eyes Off You)" (7-inch version)	Paul Hewson; David Evans; Larry Mullen Jr.; Adam Clayton; Bob Gaudio; Bob Crewe	Pet Shop Boys; Mendelsohn	4:30
16.	"Jealousy" (7-inch version)		Pet Shop Boys; Faltermeyer	4:15
17.	"DJ Culture"		Pet Shop Boys; Brothers in Rhythm	4:13
18.	"Was It Worth It?"		Pet Shop Boys; Brothers in Rhythm	4:22
Total length:				76:24

=== Notes ===
- ^{^[a]} signifies an original producer
- ^{^[b]} signifies a remixer
- ^{^[c]} signifies an additional producer
- ^{^[d]} signifies an associate producer
- Tracks 1–4 are taken from Please (1986).
- Tracks 5–7 and 9 are taken from Actually (1987).
- Tracks 10–12 are taken from Introspective (1988).
- Tracks 13, 14 and 16 are taken from Behaviour (1990).
- Tracks 8 and 15 are non-album singles.
- Tracks 17 and 18 are previously unreleased.

== Personnel ==
Credits adapted from the liner notes of Discography: The Complete Singles Collection.

=== Pet Shop Boys ===
- Neil Tennant
- Chris Lowe

=== Technical ===
- Stephen Hague – production (tracks 1, 2, 6); remix (track 3); additional production (tracks 3, 5, 17); mixing (tracks 5, 7, 17)
- David Jacob – engineering (tracks 1, 2, 6); original track production (track 8)
- J. J. Jeczalik – original recording production (track 3)
- Nicholas Froome – original recording production (track 3)
- Ron Dean Miller – New York overdubs (track 3)
- Julian Mendelsohn – production (tracks 4, 5, 7, 8, 15); engineering (tracks 4, 5, 7); mixing (tracks 6, 13, 14)
- Pet Shop Boys – production (tracks 8, 9, 13–18); original track production (track 8); associate production (track 10)
- Andy Richards – production (track 9)
- Tony Phillips – engineering (track 9)
- Lewis A. Martineé – production, engineering (track 10)
- Mike Couzzi – engineering (track 10)
- Trevor Horn – production (tracks 11, 12)
- Stephen Lipson – production, engineering (track 11)
- Pete Schwier – engineering (track 12)
- Harold Faltermeyer – production (tracks 13, 14, 16)
- Brian Reeves – engineering (tracks 13, 14, 16)
- Bob Kraushaar – engineering (track 14)
- Ren Swan – engineering (track 15)
- Brothers in Rhythm – production (tracks 17, 18)
- Paul Wright – engineering (tracks 17, 18); mixing (track 18)
- Nick Webb – mastering

=== Artwork ===
- Mark Farrow – design
- Rob Petrie – design
- 3a – design
- PSB – design
- Eric Watson – main photographs, other photographs
- Peter Andreas – other photographs
- Michael Roberts – other photographs
- Douglas Brothers – other photographs
- Lawrence Watson – other photographs

== Charts ==
=== Weekly charts ===
1991–1992 weekly chart performance for Discography: The Complete Singles Collection
Chart (1991–1992)	Peak position
Australian Albums (ARIA)	6
Austrian Albums (Ö3 Austria)	33
Belgian Albums (IFPI)	4
Canada Top Albums/CDs (RPM)	33
Dutch Albums (Album Top 100)	26
European Albums (Music & Media)	12
Finnish Albums (Suomen virallinen lista)	4
German Albums (Offizielle Top 100)	13
Greek Albums (IFPI)	10
Hungarian Albums (MAHASZ)	31
Irish Albums (IFPI)	4
Japanese Albums (Oricon)	29
New Zealand Albums (RMNZ)	8
Spanish Albums (AFYVE)	28
Swedish Albums (Sverigetopplistan)	14
Swiss Albums (Schweizer Hitparade)	27
UK Albums (Official Charts)	3
US Billboard 200	111

2025 weekly chart performance for Discography: The Complete Singles Collection
Chart (2025)	Peak position
Belgian Albums (Ultratop Flanders)	64
Belgian Albums (Ultratop Wallonia)	69
Croatian International Albums (HDU)	11
German Albums (Offizielle Top 100)	8
Hungarian Albums (MAHASZ)	11

=== Year-end charts ===
1991 year-end chart performance for Discography: The Complete Singles Collection
Chart (1991)	Position
UK Albums (OCC)	36

1992 year-end chart performance for Discography: The Complete Singles Collection
Chart (1992)	Position
European Albums (Music & Media)	80
German Albums (Offizielle Top 100)	82

== Certifications ==
Certifications for Discography: The Complete Singles Collection
Region	Certification	Certified units/sales
Argentina (CAPIF)	Gold	30,000^{^}
Australia (ARIA)	2× Platinum	140,000^{^}
Brazil (Pro-Música Brasil)	Platinum	250,000^{*}
Canada (Music Canada)	3× Platinum	300,000^{^}
Finland (Musiikkituottajat)	Gold	30,845
France (SNEP)	Gold	100,000^{*}
Germany (BVMI)	Gold	250,000^{^}
Italy (FIMI) Sales since 2009	Gold	25,000^{‡}
New Zealand (RMNZ)	Gold	7,500^{^}
Spain (Promusicae)	Gold	50,000^{^}
United Kingdom (BPI)	2× Platinum	600,000^{‡}
United States (RIAA)	Gold	719,000
^{*} Sales figures based on certification alone.^{^} Shipments figures based on certification alone.^{‡} Sales+streaming figures based on certification alone.
