= DJ Culture =

1991 single by Pet Shop Boys

Single by Pet Shop Boys

from the album Discography: The Complete Singles Collection
- B-side: "Music for Boys"
- Released: 14 October 1991
- Studio: Sarm West (London)
- Genre: Synth-pop; house
- Length: 4:13
- Label: Parlophone
- Songwriters: Neil Tennant; Chris Lowe
- Producers: Pet Shop Boys; Brothers in Rhythm

Pet Shop Boys singles chronology
"Jealousy" (1991)	"DJ Culture" (1991)	"Was It Worth It?" (1991)

Music video
- "DJ Culture" on YouTube

"DJ Culturemix"

Single by Pet Shop Boys
- B-side: "Music for Boys (Part 3)"; "Overture to Performance"
- Released: 11 November 1991
- Genre: Synth-pop; house
- Length: 5:51
- Label: Parlophone
- Songwriters: Neil Tennant; Chris Lowe
- Producer: Pet Shop Boys

Pet Shop Boys singles chronology
"DJ Culture" (1991)	"DJ Culturemix" (1991)	"Was It Worth It?" (1991)

"DJ Culture" is a song by English synth-pop duo Pet Shop Boys from their first greatest hits album, Discography: The Complete Singles Collection (1991). It was released on 14 October 1991 by Parlophone as the album's lead single, peaking at number 13 on the UK Singles Chart. Another version of the song, remixed by The Grid and entitled "DJ Culturemix", was also released as a single and reached number 40 on the UK Singles Chart. The B-side was "Music for Boys".

According to the singer Neil Tennant, the song concerned the insincerity of how President George H. W. Bush's speeches at the time of the First Gulf War utilised Winston Churchill's wartime rhetoric, in a manner similar to how artists sample music from other artists.

== Composition and recording ==
"DJ Culture" was one of two songs written as singles for Discography, along with "Was It Worth It?" Pet Shop Boys decided to use a structure of spoken verse and sung chorus, similar to "West End Girls". The music for the chorus came from a piece Chris Lowe had composed on a Fairlight.

In early 1991, Tennant used the phrase "DJ Culture" to draw an analogy between DJs sampling music and people who "sample attitudes from the past", at a time when he felt the response to the Gulf War was inauthentic. He later described the concept: "Political postures and social attitudes are glibly sampled from the past and the present like beats on dance records".

Parsing the lyrics, Tennant said the refrain "Living in a satellite fantasy" is an observation on the lack of meaningful content on 24-hour satellite television. The trend of reinventing oneself is conveyed in the lines "Like Liz before Betty", about Elizabeth Taylor at the Betty Ford Clinic, and "she after Sean", referring to Madonna's new image after her divorce from Sean Penn. "And I, my lord, may I say nothing?" paraphrases Oscar Wilde's response after he was sentenced to hard labour for homosexual practices in 1895. (Note: Wilde's actual words were, "And I? May I say nothing, my Lord?") The song also includes samples of French dialogue from the 1950 Jean Cocteau film Orphée, in which coded and poetic messages are sent over the radio.

Both singles for Discography were recorded at Sarm West with the Brothers in Rhythm production team. The chorus of "DJ Culture" features Tessa Niles echoing Tennant in a style inspired by the David Bowie song "Absolute Beginners" (1986). The duo asked producer Stephen Hague to do additional work on the 7-inch mix. Hague added a string line in the middle section, and he suggested a change to the chorus, resulting in the alternating lines "waiting for the night to end" and "wondering who's your friend".

== Release ==
Preceding the album's November release, "DJ Culture" came out on 14 October 1991 on 7-inch vinyl, 12-inch vinyl, cassette, and CD. A remix by The Grid (David Ball and Richard Norris) titled "DJ Culturemix" followed on 11 November on 12-inch, CD, and cassette. According to Music Week, Pet Shop Boys went ahead with the release "even though it will exceed the four format rule for singles. The group says the ruling shows hostility to dance music". The original release debuted on the UK Singles Chart at number 13 and spent two weeks in the top 40, and the remix entered the chart at number 40.

The single's B-side, "Music for Boys", was written by Lowe at Sarm West, inspired by stadium house music he had heard at the London Astoria. Lowe made two mixes, including an "Ambient mix". A third mix was done by Altern-8. In the US, "DJ Culture" and "Music for Boys" were released as a double A-side; it reached number 13 on the Dance Singles Sales chart.

The original cover photo, taken by Eric Watson, shows Lowe and Tennant with DJ equipment. The remix cover is a depiction of TV static.

== Music video ==
The music video was directed by Pet Shop Boys' long-time collaborator Eric Watson and was choreographed by Jacob Marley, who had worked on the Performance Tour. Tennant and Lowe alternately appear as a pair of doctors, a pair of soldiers in desert combat dress, and a football referee and fan. Lowe portrays a judge presiding over the trial of Oscar Wilde, who is played by Tennant, in a visualization of the line "And I my lord, may I say nothing?" Watson observed: "It's a line-by-line interpretation of the lyrics, completely literal".

Watson used computer-generated imagery to create a computer wargame for the opening sequence and composite shots such as Tennant and Lowe in front of the Acropolis. The production cost £150,000 and was their most expensive music video up to that point.

== Critical reception ==
Upon its release, Paul Mathur, writing for Melody Maker, felt "DJ Culture" "recall[s] PSB's earliest work" as "Tennant intones rigorously over the usual unabashed keyboard surge, like an indoor version of 'West End Girls'." Likewise, Alan Jones of Music Week described it as "a minor league West End Girls, complete with a melancholic rap from Tennant". Larry Flick of Billboard magazine called the song "a languid synth/pop romp, reminiscent of early hits, while ["Music for Boys"] is an NRGized techno-rave".

Simon Dudfield of NME felt it was "sub-standard Pet Shop Boys" with "no surprises". He stated, "Please could they deliver another chorus? There needs to be some proof of pop elegance if Tennant's irony and aloofness is going to sound anything other than smarmy, sickly and sad. A plastic veneer smothers the disco beat, the strings from their last single remain and the 'Suburbia'-style shock of keyboards that sets up the tawdry chorus suggests ideas are running dry."

== Track listings ==
- UK 7-inch: Parlophone / R 6301
1. "DJ Culture"
2. "Music for Boys"
- UK cassette: Parlophone / TCR 6301 (Note: Tracks are repeated on sides A and B.)
1. "DJ Culture"
2. "Music for Boys"
- UK 12-inch: Parlophone / 12R 6301
1. "DJ Culture" (extended mix)
2. "Music for Boys"
3. "Music for Boys" (Part 2/Ambient mix)
- UK CD: Parlophone / CDR 6301
1. "DJ Culture"
2. "Music for Boys"
3. "DJ Culture" (extended mix)

DJ Culturemix (Note: Track 2 is a remix by Altern-8. Track 3 is an orchestra medley featuring "It's a Sin", "Being Boring", "Opportunities", "So Hard ", "Jealousy", "Suburbia", "How Can You Expect to Be Taken Seriously?", "What Have I Done To Deserve This?", and "West End Girls".)

- UK 12-inch: Parlophone / 12RX 6301
- UK cassette: Parlophone / TCRX 6301
- UK CD: Parlophone / CDRX 6301
1. "DJ Culturemix" – 5:51
2. "Music for Boys" (Part 3) – 5:37
3. "Overture to Performance" – 6:15

== Personnel ==
Credits adapted from the liner notes of the CD single of "DJ Culture".

Additional musicians

- Greg Bone – guitar
- Andy Duncan – percussion
- Tessa Niles – additional vocals
- DJ Reckless – scratching
- Scott Davidson – programming

Technical personnel

- Pet Shop Boys – production
- Brothers in Rhythm – production
- Stephen Hague – mixing, additional production
- Paul Wright – engineering

Artwork

- Mark Farrow/3a/PSB – design
- Eric Watson – photography

== Charts ==
=== Weekly charts ===
Weekly chart performance for "DJ Culture"
Chart (1991)	Peak position
Australia (ARIA)	130
Europe (Eurochart Hot 100 Singles)	25
Europe (European Hit Radio)	20
Finland (Suomen virallinen lista)	6
Germany (GfK)	19
Ireland (IRMA)	7
Sweden (Sverigetopplistan)	17
Switzerland (Schweizer Hitparade)	21
UK Singles (OCC)	13
UK Airplay (Music Week)	7
UK Dance (Music Week)	49
US Dance Singles Sales (Billboard) with "Music for Boys"	13

=== Year-end charts ===
Year-end chart performance for "DJ Culture"
Chart (1991)	Position
Sweden (Topplistan)	90

== Release history ==
Release dates and formats for "DJ Culture"
Region	Date	Format(s)	Label(s)	Ref(s).
United Kingdom	14 October 1991	7-inch vinyl; 12-inch vinyl; CD; cassette	Parlophone	
United Kingdom	11 November 1991	12-inch vinyl; CD; cassette ("DJ Culturemix")	Parlophone	
Australia	18 November 1991	12-inch vinyl; CD; cassette	Parlophone; EMI	
Japan	20 November 1991	Mini-CD	EMI	
