= Performance Tour =

1991 concert tour by Pet Shop Boys

Performance tour
- Tour by Pet Shop Boys
- Poster to the concerts in Japan
- Location: Asia; North America; Europe
- Associated album: Behaviour
- Start date: 11 March 1991
- End date: 14 June 1991
- No. of shows: 57

Pet Shop Boys concert chronology
- MCMLXXXIX Tour (1989); Performance (1991); Discovery Tour (1994)

The Performance Tour was a concert tour by English synth-pop duo Pet Shop Boys launched in 1991 to promote their fourth studio album Behaviour (1990). Despite being their second tour overall, this was their first world tour to visit the US. Spanning all in all three continents, the tour lasted three months, starting on 11 March 1991 in Tokyo, Japan, and concluding on 14 June 1991 in Dublin, Ireland.

The show was directed by David Alden and designed by the award-winning stage designer David Fielding, a cutting edge duo known for their avantgarde reworkings of traditional operas. In the same vein, Performance purported to stage a theatrical presentation of the band's music.

== Background and concept ==
Despite ambitious plans for theatrical live shows in 1986 and 1987, Pet Shop Boys soon realised that the financial realities of the pop music industry clashed with their vision, forcing them to cancel the planned tours. Thanks to a kind offer from a Japanese promoter, the idea was revived in 1989, but even then Pet Shop Boys were not entirely convinced of the idea of nightly performances in front of fans. The band's first small-scale tour consisting of 14 dates visited Japan, Hong Kong and the UK. "We're not a live band, really," remarked lead singer Neil Tennant during one of the press conferences held to promote the tour. Despite this, the band returned to the road two years later announcing that the new tour would be even more theatrical than the previous one.

The Performance tour was conceived with no live band on stage; instead, it involved background singers, dancers and "more costume changes than at a Cher concert". With the emphasis on theatrical elements and choreography, the show prioritised a dramatic presentation over traditional band performance with Tennant and Chris Lowe adopting a more actor-like stage presence.

With the set design visualising the themes of the songs in the set list, the show featured a slew of characters including, among others, English schoolboys in uniforms, women in 1950s attire and a ballerina with a gun. The concert's imagery also included an act of self-strangulation with a telephone cord and Tennant being electroshocked while sitting in a cage.

The tour kicked off in Tokyo on 11 March 1991, the same day as the double-A side single "Where the Streets Have No Name (I Can't Take My Eyes Off You)" / "How Can You Expect to Be Taken Seriously?" was released. The North American leg was scheduled to open at the Knight Center in Miami on 19 March 1991, but the show had to be canceled less than 15 minutes before the start time due to a buzzing sound caused by the different voltages used in European and US equipment. The concert was rescheduled for the following night, 20 March.

== Production ==
The music was performed by Tennant and Lowe with three additional vocalists, two off-stage musicians, and an array of sequencers and other audio equipment controlled by MIDI technology.

Tennant sang live vocals, along with Derek Green, Sylvia Mason-James, and Pamela Sheyne. The backing vocalists took the lead on some songs, notably "My October Symphony" performed by Green and "Rent" sung by Mason-James. Tennant and the other vocalists used the newly developed Radio Station in-ear monitor system to hear audio feeds during the performance.

Lowe had a keyboard setup with a Korg M1 synthesizer and an Akai S1000 sampler, and he also played a Lync LN-1000 portable keyboard. At times, he was on stage without an instrument. He rapped for a performance of his B-side, "We All Feel Better in the Dark".

Scott Davidson played additional keyboards and operated the sequencers. He was positioned in the wings, out of view of the audience, along with J.J. Belle, who played guitar as well as percussion using an Octapad. Tennant played guitar for the encore, "Always on My Mind".

The production used a number of samples and sequences from the duo's studio material, including their most recent album at the time, Behaviour. The music was generated live for each performance, and Notator Logic software was used to make changes as needed. Keyboard technician Derek Simpson explained, "they're showing that what they can do in the studio, they can do on the stage here; they can re-arrange the songs, ad-lib if they want at any time. They can speed songs up, change parts and change samples—it's as live as they can get it".

The equipment included Akai S1000 samplers, Roland MC-500 MkII sequencers, Yamaha DMP7 mixers, and a Roland MKS-80 Super Jupiter analogue synth module. The bass sounds came from a Roland S-770 sampler. An Akai DD1000 optical disk recorder was used for the orchestral parts and background vocal effects. The North American leg of the tour had a Turbosound TMS-3 sound system, while the European leg was the first large indoor arena tour to use the new Flashlight system.

== Concert synopsis ==
The storyline of the performance follows Pet Shop Boys on a journey "from school to madness to popstardom to death, all the time battling with strange forces within them and against them, before finding some kind of rest", with the fate of the world hanging in the balance.

The concert opens with an orchestral medley of Pet Shop Boys songs. A seated figure mummified in red cloth is unwrapped. A schoolboy plays with a large globe, and a hooded figure with wings appears, carrying a book of runes. A man in a white suit and hat is stabbed with a beam of light.

As the song "This Must Be the Place I Waited Years to Leave" begins, a line of schoolboys walk onstage holding hands. Tennant and Lowe, dressed in school uniforms, break off from the group; Tennant straddles a chair to sing while Lowe sits at his feet and holds up an apple. The schoolboys write on slates, spelling out "Jesus Saves", and simulate masturbation. Beds are wheeled onstage for "It's a Sin" and the performers change into nightshirts. Figures representing Sex and Death move among the beds tormenting them; Lowe's bed is stood on end as he hangs from it with his keyboard around his neck. The scene carries over into the next number, "Losing My Mind", with Tennant accompanied on vocals by Sylvia Mason-James, who wields a whip and leads a man on a leash. A reprisal of "This Must Be the Place I Waited Years to Leave" plays over a short interval.

Tennant and Lowe change into brightly coloured suits with bowler hats and moustaches and ride surfboards for "What Have I Done to Deserve This?" The Dusty Springfield parts are covered by Mason-James, Derek Green, and Pamela Sheyne. The female dancers wear 1950s skirts and pumpkin heads and the male dancers have face masks and baseball bats. Green sings lead vocals on "My October Symphony", as a ballerina dances and a giant head of Stalin is destroyed with a hammer and sickle. During "I'm Not Scared", everyone carries suitcases as the duo are surrounded by masked dancers. Lowe, looking through binoculars, is left behind at the end. He strips down to his underwear to perform his lead vocal number, "We All Feel Better in the Dark", with two of the dancers, while the others enact suggestive scenes in the background. Tennant duets with Sheyne, dressed as a nurse, on "So Sorry, I Said". He is put in a straitjacket and given an injection, while Lowe is locked in a cage. The first half ends with Tennant undergoing electroshock therapy during "Suburbia". A clock above the stage is destroyed with machine-gun fire.

After an interval, the second half opens with "So Hard", with the ensemble carrying umbrellas emblazoned with question marks. For "Opportunities (Let's Make Lots of Money)", the dancers appear as pigs in business suits while Tennant and Lowe play the roles of a promoter and a rock star. The pigs become paparazzi for the follow-up number, "How Can You Expect to Be Taken Seriously", photographing Lowe as he lounges on the stage with a portable keyboard. Mason-James sings "Rent", followed by a Las Vegas-style performance of "Where the Streets Have No Name (I Can't Take My Eyes Off You)" by the ensemble. While Tennant narrates "West End Girls" from the wings, Lowe enacts the role of a drunk in a dive bar. Closing the second half with "Jealousy", Tennant and Lowe are pinned down by giant Oscar statuettes and die together.

The duo return as angels, dressed in white with wings, for an encore of "Always On My Mind" and a curtain call for the performers. Lowe lies down in a bed to sleep, while Tennant sings "Your Funny Uncle" and then does the same.

== Critical reception ==
=== North America ===
The tour sparked diverse reactions in the press. Many American reviewers were left unimpressed with stage reimaginings of Pet Shop Boys' songs and the overall emphasis on theatrics over musicianship. "Was all this a crutch for songs that couldn't stand on their own?", asked a reviewer in San Jose Mercury News.

While acknowledging the uniqueness of the theatrical concert experience, critic Barbara Jaeger of The Record found Performance devoid of both drama and humour. Instead, she described the show as a sequence of "grotesque characters" and disturbing visuals. Dan Aquilante of the New York Post described the concert as "a stunning display of pretentiousness", which was "overdone, under-thought and outrageous". He was particularly displeased with the show's eroticism, particularly the scene of simulated masturbation (during the English schoolboy number) at the end of "This Must Be the Place I've Waited Years to Leave", calling on the Radio City Music Hall "to install windows to air the place out".

Other reviewers were more favourable, likening the audacity and scope of the show to Broadway productions. Richard Cromelin of the Los Angeles Times compared Performance to other concerts in the rock-theater tradition, such as David Bowie's Diamond Dogs Tour and Madonna's Blond Ambition World Tour. He particularly praised the set and staging noting that it "serves the sense and the tone of the song".

Continuing the comparisons with Madonna's Blond Ambition tour, Barry Walters of San Francisco Examiner described the show as bold and sensational. He recognised the shared influences between Madonna and Pet Shop Boys noting how both drew on "similar sources – cabaret, disco escapism, post modern deconstruction, religion, sex, camp and the love of a good, gaudy show-stopper". The result, according to Walters, was "more performance art than rock concert", which could be "the future of pop".

Rob Tannenbaum in his Rolling Stone review of the New York concert further acknowledged the show's potential impact, suggesting it could "set a new standard for pop flamboyance and grandiosity" and even become one of "pivotal events in concert history". However, Tannenbaum also recognised how it could be perceived as "an epic display of pretentiousness".

== Set list ==
Adapted from the Performance DVD box.

1. "This Must Be the Place I Waited Years to Leave"
2. "It's a Sin"
3. "Losing My Mind"
4. "This Must Be the Place I Waited Years to Leave" (Reprise)
5. "What Have I Done to Deserve This?"
6. "My October Symphony"
7. "I'm Not Scared"
8. "We All Feel Better in the Dark"
9. "So Sorry, I Said"
10. "Suburbia"
  Interval
11. "So Hard"
12. "Opportunities (Let's Make Lots of Money)"
13. "How Can You Expect to Be Taken Seriously?"
14. "Rent"
15. "Where the Streets Have No Name (I Can't Take My Eyes Off You)"
16. "West End Girls"
17. "Jealousy"
  Encore
18. "Always On My Mind"
19. "Being Boring" (Note: "Being Boring" was added late in the tour following complaints of its omission by fans including Axl Rose.)
20. "Your Funny Uncle"

== Tour dates ==
List of tour dates, showing date, city, country and venue
Date	City	Country	Venue
Asia
11 March 1991	Tokyo	Japan	Yoyogi Olympic Pool
12 March 1991	Osaka	Japan	Castle Hall
14 March 1991	Yokohama	Japan	Gym
15 March 1991	Tokyo	Japan	Nippon Budokan
North America
20 March 1991 (Note: Rescheduled from 19 March due to technical difficulties.)	Miami	United States	Knight Center
21 March 1991	New Orleans	United States	McAllister/Saenger
23 March 1991	Houston	United States	Southern Star Amphitheatre
27 March 1991	San Francisco	United States	Warfield Theatre
28 March 1991	San Francisco	United States	Warfield Theatre
29 March 1991	Los Angeles	United States	Universal Amphitheatre
30 March 1991	Los Angeles	United States	Universal Amphitheatre
1 April 1991	Salt Lake City	United States	Kingsbury Auditorium
3 April 1991	Minneapolis	United States	Orpheum Theatre
4 April 1991	Chicago	United States	Chicago Theatre (Note: Venue moved from the Riviera Theatre due to the production requirements.)
5 April 1991	Detroit	United States	Clubland
7 April 1991	Washington, D.C.	United States	Bender Arena
9 April 1991	New York City	United States	Radio City Music Hall
10 April 1991	New York City	United States	Radio City Music Hall
11 April 1991	Boston	United States	Orpheum Theatre
14 April 1991	Toronto	Canada	Varsity Arena
15 April 1991	Montreal	Canada	Verdun Auditorium
Europe
18 April 1991	Paris	France	Zénith de Paris
19 April 1991	Brussels	Belgium	Forest National
21 April 1991	Berlin	Germany	Deutschlandhalle
22 April 1991	Bremen	Germany	Stadthalle Bremen
23 April 1991	Dortmund	Germany	Westfalenhalle
25 April 1991	Frankfurt	Germany	Festhalle Frankfurt
26 April 1991	Mannheim	Germany	Eisstadion
28 April 1991	Munich	Germany	Olympiahalle
30 April 1991	Hannover	Germany	Eilenriedehalle
2 May 1991	Copenhagen	Denmark	Valby Hotel
3 May 1991	Gothenburg	Sweden	Scandinavium
4 May 1991	Stockholm	Sweden	Stockholm Globe Arena
6 May 1991	Helsinki	Finland	Helsinki Ice Hall
9 May 1991	Prague	Czechoslovakia	Sportovní hala ČSTV
10 May 1991	Ostrava	Czechoslovakia	Palace of Sports and Culture
11 May 1991	Vienna	Austria	Wiener Stadthalle
12 May 1991	Budapest	Hungary	Budapest Sportcsarnok
14 May 1991	Zagreb	Croatia	Dom Sportova
16 May 1991	Stuttgart	Germany	Hanns-Martin-Schleyer-Halle
17 May 1991	Zurich	Switzerland	Hallenstadion
18 May 1991	Milan	Italy	Palatrussardi
21 May 1991	Madrid	Spain	Palacio de Deportes de la Comunidad de Madrid
22 May 1991	Barcelona	Spain	Palau Sant Jordi
24 May 1991	Rotterdam	Netherlands	Ahoy Rotterdam
27 May 1991	Blackpool	England	Opera House Theatre
28 May 1991	Glasgow	Scotland	Scottish Exhibition and Conference Centre
29 May 1991	Aberdeen	Scotland	AECC Arena
1 June 1991	Birmingham	England	NEC Arena
2 June 1991	Birmingham	England	NEC Arena
3 June 1991	Birmingham	England	NEC Arena
5 June 1991	Whitley Bay	England	Whitley Bay Ice Rink
7 June 1991	London	England	Wembley Arena
8 June 1991	London	England	Wembley Arena
9 June 1991	London	England	Wembley Arena
13 June 1991	Belfast	Northern Ireland	King's Hall
14 June 1991	Dublin	Ireland	The Point

== Concert film ==
The tour was captured on film by director Eric Watson and released as a concert film. Alongside the live show, the film features backstage footage. An hour-long version premiered on BBC Two on 29 December 1991. Performance was released on videocassette and debuted at number two on Music Week's Music Video chart in October 1992.

The VHS release of the film skips the latter portion of the "Where the Streets Have No Name (I Can't Take My Eyes Off You)" medley, which was removed from the recording due to copyright issues, although it was shown in full length on British television in 1991. The missing segment was later included on the 2004 DVD release. The DVD also features commentary by Tennant and Lowe.

== Tour diary ==
The North American leg was documented in the tour diary Pet Shop Boys versus America, written by journalist Chris Heath with black-and-white photographs by noted music photographer Pennie Smith. It was originally published by Viking in 1993 and was reissued by the William Heinemann imprint of Penguin in 2020, along with Heath's previous book, Pet Shop Boys, Literally (1990), which covered the duo's 1989 tour.

Pet Shop Boys versus America is a firsthand, day-by-day account of tour stops in 14 cities in the US and Canada from 17 March to 15 April 1991. Tennant and Lowe met with members of the press and music industry and encountered celebrities including Steven Spielberg and Axl Rose. Heath shares their reactions to incidents like the last-minute postponement of the first concert in Miami due to technical difficulties, as well as their performance on The Tonight Show with Jay Leno, when Lowe walked off the set because he was not shown on camera. At the time, Pet Shop Boys' critically acclaimed album Behaviour was not selling as well as their previous records, and in a number of the transcribed conversations they expressed concerns about their future.

== Personnel ==
Credits are adapted from the Performance tour programme (1991), Pet Shop Boys versus America (2020) and Studio Sound and Broadcast Engineering (August 1991).

Pet Shop Boys

- Chris Lowe
- Neil Tennant

Additional musicians

- J.J. Belle – guitar, percussion
- Scott Davidson – keyboards, sequencers
- Derek Green – additional vocals
- Sylvia Mason-James – additional vocals
- Pamela Sheyne – additional vocals

Dancers

- Petee Aloysius
- Trevor Henry
- Craig Maguire
- Catherine Malone
- Mark Martin
- Leon Maurice-Jones
- Suki Miles
- Katie Puckrik
- Sarah Toner
- Noel Wallace

Creative and technical personnel

- David Alden – director
- David Fielding – designer
- Martin Duncan – associate director
- Charles Edwards – assistant designer
- Jacob Marley – choreographer
- Ivan Kushlick – tour manager
- Robbie Williams – production manager
- Howard Hopkins – stage manager
- Heather Carson – lighting designer
- Jon Lemon – sound engineer
- Nick Bruce-Smith – monitor engineer
- Derek Simpson – keyboard technician, programmer
- Gabrielle Burrell – costume supervisor
- Alan Keyes – wardrobe
- Lynne Easton – make-up
- Peter King – wigs
- Leonard Hughes – hair stylist
