= Behaviour (Pet Shop Boys album) =

Studio album by Pet Shop Boys
- Released: 22 October 1990
- Recorded: April–June 1990
- Studios: Red Deer (Munich); Sarm West (London); Abbey Road (London) (Note: Orchestra and strings)
- Genres: Synth-pop; dance-pop; symphonic pop
- Length: 49:01
- Label: Parlophone
- Producers: Pet Shop Boys; Harold Faltermeyer

Pet Shop Boys chronology
Introspective (1988)	Behaviour (1990)	Discography: The Complete Singles Collection (1991)

Singles from Behaviour
- 1. "So Hard" Released: 24 September 1990; 2. "Being Boring" Released: 12 November 1990; 3. "How Can You Expect to Be Taken Seriously?" Released: 11 March 1991; 4. "Jealousy" Released: 28 May 1991

Behaviour (spelled Behavior in the United States) is the fourth studio album by the English synth-pop duo Pet Shop Boys, released on 22 October 1990 by Parlophone. A Japanese special edition included a bonus mini CD, exclusive artwork and printed lyrics in a white velvet-like box.

== Background ==
Harold Faltermeyer produced Behaviour at his Red Deer studio in Munich, Germany (West Germany at the time of recording). Because they were dissatisfied with the available digital synthesisers and samples, Pet Shop Boys wanted to use analogue synthesisers. Faltermeyer was chosen as a producer as he happened to be an expert on analogue equipment. Recording began in April 1990 and took ten weeks, with a break in the middle.

The result was a Pet Shop Boys album that differed from both the previous album, Introspective, and the 1993 follow-up, Very. In places, the album expands upon the synth-pop genre with flavours of guitar pop ballads, as with "This Must Be the Place I Waited Years to Leave" and "My October Symphony" (a song about the decline of the Soviet Union), featuring guitarist Johnny Marr with whom Neil Tennant had worked on the 1989 Electronic song "Getting Away with It". Later, the duo reflected on the different style of Behaviour: "It was more reflective and more musical-sounding, and also it probably didn't have irritatingly crass ideas in it, like our songs often do." They were inspired by fellow synth-pop group Depeche Mode's album Violator, released earlier that same year, which had "raised the stakes", according to Chris Lowe.

In a 1993 interview with NME, Lowe recalled of Behaviour, "The funny thing was that album was written at a time when the whole rave scene was fantastically exciting and good, the music was really up. I can't understand what happened; we set out to write an uplifting album and we ended up with something which was the complete opposite." Tennant added, "There was an element of sadness to it, it's one of these things that sad songs are more interesting to write."

== Singles ==
- "So Hard" (R 6269 – 24 September 1990)

The video was directed by Eric Watson. The B-side was "It Must Be Obvious", with the USA release also having the Italian Mix of "Paninaro", which was originally released on Disco. Remixes were by the Pet Shop Boys themselves, The KLF and David Morales. The KLF also remixed "It Must Be Obvious", which was only available on The KLF versus Pet Shop Boys CD and 12-inch of the single.

- "Being Boring" (R 6275 – 12 November 1990)

The video was directed by Bruce Weber. The B-side was "We All Feel Better in the Dark". There were Pet Shop Boys Extended Mixes of both A-side and B-side, and there was a remix of "Being Boring" by Marshall Jefferson and two remixes of the B-side by Brothers in Rhythm on a limited edition 12-inch and CD of the single.

- "How Can You Expect to Be Taken Seriously?" (E2-56205 – 1991)

The video was directed by Liam Kan. The single was radically remixed from the album version by Brothers in Rhythm, and this become the version on the double A-side released in the UK with "Where the Streets Have No Name (I Can't Take My Eyes Off You)". This US release had the Techno Funk mix of "I Want a Dog", the Marshall Jefferson remix of "Being Boring" and the Trevor Horn 7-inch mix of "It's Alright". There were also remixes by David Morales, which were released on a limited edition 12-inch and CD. The single mix was not on any of the Pet Shop Boys' greatest hits or singles compilations (Discography: The Complete Singles Collection, Pop Art: Pet Shop Boys – The Hits and Smash: The Singles 1985–2020), although the video was on the Pop Art DVD, Videography and the Smash Blu-ray.

- "Where the Streets Have No Name (I Can't Take My Eyes Off You)" / "How Can You Expect to Be Taken Seriously?" (R 6285 – 11 March 1991)

The videos for both songs were directed by Liam Kan, which drew on iconography from the Pet Shop Boys' then current tour with Tennant spoofing several 'rock' stars including U2, Bruce Springsteen, Elvis Presley and George Michael. There was an additional B-side, "Bet She's Not Your Girlfriend", and, in addition to some extended mixes of both singles, there were additional remixes of both songs by David Morales.

- "Jealousy" (R 6283 – 28 May 1991)

The video was directed by Eric Watson. The B-side was the Pet Shop Boys' tidied-up demo version of "Losing My Mind", which they produced for Liza Minnelli in 1989 for her album Results. The single mix was more electronic than the album version and there was an extended mix of "Jealousy" with Tennant reading excerpts of Shakespeare's Othello, which is a play about jealousy. There was also a Disco Mix of "Losing My Mind". On the limited edition CD, an edit of the Extended Mix of "This Must Be the Place I Waited Years to Leave" (which was originally available with the Japanese version of Behaviour) was included along with David Morales' Red Zone mix of "So Hard". "Jealousy" was later covered by Dubstar. It is known to be one of Robbie Williams' favourite Pet Shop Boys songs, and he sang it with the duo for their 2006 Radio 2 concert, which was later released on the 2006 Pet Shop Boys' live album Concrete.

== Critical reception ==
Professional ratings
Review scores
Source	Rating
AllMusic	4.5/5 stars
Chicago Tribune	3.5/4 stars
Entertainment Weekly	A+
Los Angeles Times	3/5 stars
NME	6/10
Pitchfork	8.5/10
Q	4/5 stars
Record Mirror	4/5
The Rolling Stone Album Guide	4.5/5 stars
Vox	6/10

Behaviour was met with very good reviews in 1990 and has since gained excellent reviews in retrospective. Reviewing Behaviour for Entertainment Weekly, Jim Farber commented that the album contained the Pet Shop Boys' "best tunes yet" and "their most consistently beautiful melodies to date", noting "an easier way with the beats and greater vulnerability in the lyrics" compared to the duo's earlier material. Greg Kot of the Chicago Tribune wrote that Behaviour "may strike some listeners as even wimpier and blander than earlier releases, but its subtle brilliance emerges with repeated plays", calling it "a record that'll seduce dance clubs for a few months, and haunt the stay-at-home crowd for long after". "Some of their dance fans may be a trifle disappointed," wrote Mark Cooper for Q, "but the best ballads here are as wry and touching as vintage Broadway. Frank Sinatra should be calling shortly." The magazine named Behaviour one of the 50 best albums of 1990. Robert Christgau selected "Being Boring" and "My October Symphony" as highlights in his Village Voice "Consumer Guide" column; he later gave the album a "two-star honorable mention" grade, indicating a "likable effort that consumers attuned to its overriding aesthetic or individual vision may well enjoy".

In a mixed review, NME's Roger Morton conceded that Behaviour "is probably no more a disconsolate record than Introspective or Actually", but questioned its relative lack of "a defiant surge of rhythm". Robert Hilburn of the Los Angeles Times found that the album reaches "the emotional peaks" of the Pet Shop Boys' previous work on "peppy highlights" such as "So Hard" and "The End of the World", while "the occasional lapses and the forays into slower tempos" feel "flat by comparison".

In 1999, Q listed Behaviour as one of the 90 best albums of the 1990s, while the critic Ned Raggett ranked it ninth on his list of "The Top 136 or So Albums of the Nineties" for Freaky Trigger. Behaviour is included in the book 1001 Albums You Must Hear Before You Die.

== Re-release ==
Along with the rest of the group's first six studio albums, Behaviour was re-released as Behaviour: Further Listening: 1990–1991 in 2001. The reissue was digitally remastered and accompanied with a second disc of B-sides, and some previously unreleased songs, recorded from 1990 to 1991. Notable songs on the second disc include "Miserablism", "DJ Culture", "Was It Worth It?" and the ambient mix of "Music for Boys". "Miserablism", a poignant satire of Morrissey, was intended for inclusion on Behaviour until the day it was sent for mastering. It later became the B-side to "Was It Worth It?" and was remixed by Moby for the 12-inch single; it was also on the limited-edition version of the duo's 2003 compilation album PopArt: The Hits, in a remixed form. "DJ Culture" and "Was It Worth It?" were the two singles recorded for the Pet Shop Boys' 1991 compilation album, Discography: The Complete Singles Collection. "Music for Boys (ambient mix)" was one of two mixes of the song by Lowe; it was originally listed as "Music for Boys (part 2)" on the 12-inch single of "DJ Culture". The other mix can be found on the 1995 compilation album Alternative.

Another re-release followed on 9 February 2009, under the title of Behaviour: Remastered. This version contains only the 10 tracks on the original. In 2018, a newly remastered edition of the two-disc Behaviour: Further Listening: 1990–1991 was released.

== Track listing ==
All tracks are written by Chris Lowe and Neil Tennant, except where noted.

No.	Title	Length
1.	"Being Boring"	6:49
2.	"This Must Be the Place I Waited Years to Leave"	5:30
3.	"To Face the Truth"	5:33
4.	"How Can You Expect to Be Taken Seriously?"	3:56
5.	"Only the Wind"	4:20
6.	"My October Symphony"	5:18
7.	"So Hard"	3:58
8.	"Nervously"	4:06
9.	"The End of the World"	4:43
10.	"Jealousy"	4:48
Total length:		49:01

Japanese special edition (bonus mini disc)
No.	Title	Length
1.	"Miserablism"	4:11
2.	"Bet She's Not Your Girlfriend"	4:26
3.	"This Must Be the Place I Waited Years to Leave" (extended mix)	9:30
Total length:		18:07

Further Listening 1990–1991 (bonus disc)
No.	Title	Writer(s)	Length
1.	"It Must Be Obvious"		4:26
2.	"So Hard" (extended dance mix)		6:38
3.	"Miserablism"		4:07
4.	"Being Boring" (extended mix)		10:40
5.	"Bet She's Not Your Girlfriend"		4:30
6.	"We All Feel Better in the Dark" (extended mix)		6:48
7.	"Where the Streets Have No Name (I Can't Take My Eyes Off You)" (extended mix) (previously unreleased on CD)	Paul Hewson; Dave Evans; Larry Mullen; Adam Clayton; Bob Gaudio; Bob Crewe	6:46
8.	"Jealousy" (extended version)		7:58
9.	"Generic Jingle" (previously unreleased)		0:14
10.	"DJ Culture" (extended mix)		6:53
11.	"Was It Worth It?" (twelve-inch mix)		7:15
12.	"Music for Boys" (ambient mix) (previously unreleased on CD)		6:13
13.	"DJ Culture" (seven-inch mix)		4:26
Total length:			1:16:54

== Personnel ==
=== Behaviour ===
Credits adapted from the liner notes of Behaviour.

Pet Shop Boys

- Neil Tennant
- Chris Lowe

Additional musicians

- Dominic Clarke – additional programming (all tracks), plastic tube (track 1)
- J.J. Belle – guitar (track 1)
- Johnny Marr – rhythm guitar, feedback guitar (track 2), guitar (track 6)
- Angelo Badalamenti – orchestra arrangement and conducting (tracks 2, 5)
- Alexander Bălănescu – string quartet arrangement (track 6)
- Balanescu Quartet – strings (track 6)
- Jay Henry – additional vocals (track 6)

Technical

- Pet Shop Boys – production
- Harold Faltermeyer – production
- Brian Reeves – engineering
- Bob Kraushaar – engineering (all tracks); vocal recording (tracks 1, 4, 6, 10)
- Julian Mendelsohn – mixing
- Haydn Bendall – orchestra recording, strings recording

Artwork

- Eric Watson – photography
- Mark Farrow – design
- Pet Shop Boys – design

=== Further Listening 1990–1991 ===
Credits adapted from the liner notes of Behaviour: Further Listening 1990–1991.

Pet Shop Boys

- Neil Tennant
- Chris Lowe

Additional musicians

- Dominic Clarke – additional programming (tracks 1–3); programming (tracks 5, 6); sequencing (track 7)
- Gary Maughan – additional keyboards (track 5)
- Juliet Roberts – additional vocals (track 6)
- J.J. Belle – guitars (track 7)
- Tessa Niles – additional vocals (tracks 7, 11, 13)
- Harold Faltermeyer – orchestral arrangement (track 8)
- Scott Davidson – programming (tracks 10, 11, 13)
- Greg Bone – guitar (tracks 10, 11, 13)
- Pete Gleadall – programming (track 11)
- Andy Duncan – percussion (track 11)
- Carol Kenyon – additional vocals (track 11)
- Guida de Palma – additional vocals (track 11)

Technical

- Pet Shop Boys – production (tracks 1–11, 13); remix (tracks 6, 11); mixing (track 8); compilation
- Pete Schwier – engineering (tracks 1, 5); mixing (track 1)
- Harold Faltermeyer – production (tracks 2–4, 8)
- Brian Reeves – engineering (tracks 2–4)
- Julian Mendelsohn – mixing (tracks 2–5); production (track 7)
- Bob Kraushaar – engineering (tracks 5, 6)
- Paul Wright – engineering (tracks 6, 10, 11, 13)
- David Jacob – remix (track 6); mixing (track 8)
- Ren Swan – engineering (track 7)
- Steve Fitzmaurice – engineering assistance (track 7)
- Mike Jarratt – orchestra recording (track 8)
- Brothers in Rhythm – production (tracks 10, 11, 13); mixing (track 10)
- Stephen Hague – mix, additional production (track 13)
- Chris Heath – compilation
- Tim Young – 2001 & 2018 remastering

Artwork

- Derek Ridgers, the Douglas Brothers, Peter Calvin, George Hurrell, Sheila Rock, Pennie Smith – photographs
- John Huba – centrespread photograph
- Paul Rider – booklet cover photograph
- Eric Watson – album cover photographs

== Charts ==
=== Weekly charts ===
Weekly chart performance for Behaviour
Chart (1990–1991)	Peak position
Australian Albums (ARIA)	27
Austrian Albums (Ö3 Austria)	22
Canada Top Albums/CDs (RPM)	34
Dutch Albums (Album Top 100)	51
European Albums (Music & Media)	6
Finnish Albums (Suomen virallinen lista)	3
German Albums (Offizielle Top 100)	4
Hungarian Albums (MAHASZ)	21
Icelandic Albums (Tónlist)	10
Italian Albums (Musica e dischi)	17
Japanese Albums (Oricon)	9
New Zealand Albums (RMNZ)	47
Spanish Albums (AFYVE)	9
Swedish Albums (Sverigetopplistan)	9
Swiss Albums (Schweizer Hitparade)	12
UK Albums (Official Charts)	2
US Billboard 200	45

Chart (2024)	Peak position
Greek Albums (IFPI)	61

=== Year-end charts ===
Year-end chart performance for Behaviour
Chart (1991)	Position
European Albums (Music & Media)	73
German Albums (Offizielle Top 100)	38

== Certifications and sales ==
Certifications and sales for Behaviour
Region	Certification	Certified units/sales
Brazil	—	120,000
Canada (Music Canada)	Gold	50,000^{^}
Finland (Musiikkituottajat)	Gold	41,480
Germany (BVMI)	Gold	250,000^{^}
Spain (Promusicae)	Gold	50,000^{^}
Sweden (GLF)	Gold	50,000^{^}
Switzerland (IFPI Switzerland)	Gold	25,000^{^}
United Kingdom (BPI)	Platinum	300,000^{^}
^{^} Shipments figures based on certification alone.
