= Goes Petshopping =

Studio album by West End Girls
- Released: 2006
- Genre: Pop; electronica; synth-pop
- Length: 44:49
- Label: Sony BMG
- Producer: Johan Fjellström

West End Girls chronology
Goes Petshopping (2006)	Shoplifters (2009)

Goes Petshopping is the first album by West End Girls, the Pet Shop Boys tribute band, released in 2009. In Japan, the album is titled We Love Pet Shop Boys!, and features an exclusive bonus track.

== Track listing ==
1. "I'm Not Scared"
2. "Domino Dancing"
3. "Suburbia"
4. "Rent"
5. "Shopping"
6. "You Only Tell Me You Love Me When You're Drunk"
7. "West End Girls"
8. "Being Boring"
9. "Love Comes Quickly"
10. "It's a Sin"
11. "Jealousy"

We Love Pet Shop Boys! bonus track

12. "Go West"

== Charts ==
Chart performance for Goes Petshopping
Chart (2006)	Peak position
Swedish Albums (Sverigetopplistan)	12
