= Was It Worth It? (Pet Shop Boys song) =

1991 single by Pet Shop Boys

Single by Pet Shop Boys

from the album Discography: The Complete Singles Collection
- B-side: "Miserablism"
- Released: 9 December 1991
- Studio: Sarm West (London)
- Genre: Hi-NRG; synth-pop; disco
- Length: 4:24
- Label: Parlophone
- Songwriters: Neil Tennant; Chris Lowe
- Producers: Pet Shop Boys; Brothers in Rhythm

Pet Shop Boys singles chronology
"DJ Culturemix" (1991)	"Was It Worth It?" (1991)	"Can You Forgive Her?" (1993)

Music video
- "Was It Worth It?" on YouTube

"Was it Worth it?" is a song by English synth-pop duo Pet Shop Boys from their first greatest hits album, Discography: The Complete Singles Collection (1991). It was one of two new songs on the compilation, along with "DJ Culture", and it was released on 9 December 1991 by Parlophone as the second and final single. Peaking at number 24 on the UK Singles Chart, "Was It Worth It?" ended a streak of 16 consecutive top 20 hits that had started with "West End Girls" in 1985. The accompanying music video was directed by Eric Watson.

== Composition and recording ==
The two singles for Discography were recorded at Sarm West with the production group Brothers in Rhythm. Neil Tennant had begun writing "Was It Worth It?" before the duo's fourth studio album, Behaviour (1990), and Chris Lowe added the chorus. Steve Anderson of Brothers in Rhythm contributed a piano part, which Tennant likened to the 1989 Black Box single "Ride on Time". "Was It Worth It?" is in a call and response format and features backing vocalists Tessa Niles, Carol Kenyon, and Ghida de Palma.

Describing the lyrics, Tennant said: "It's a reaffirmation of the worth of love, an 'I am what I am' sort of song". He called it "a very gay song. Very gay positive. It's basically saying: if I had to do it all again, I wouldn't change a single thing".

== Release ==
"Was It Worth It?" was released a month after Discography went on sale and became the group's first single to miss the top 20 since the original version of "Opportunities (Let's Make Lots of Money)" in 1985 (the next being "Numb" 15 years later in 2006). Music Week chart commentator Alan Jones suggested that the single might have underachieved in part because the album had already sold over 300,000 copies.

The single was issued on 7-inch vinyl, 12-inch vinyl, CD, and cassette formats. The B-side, "Miserablism", mixed by Julian Mendelsohn and produced by Harold Faltermeyer, was originally slated for inclusion on Behaviour but was removed late in the process.

"Was It Worth It?" was not included on their later hits compilation PopArt: The Hits (2003) because it had missed the top 20; however, the music video was featured on the DVD edition. The song appears on the reissue Behaviour: Further Listening 1990–1991 and on the compilation Smash: The Singles 1985–2020.

=== Artwork ===
The single cover (pictured) features dolls of Lowe and Tennant made by a Japanese fan, Toshima Tada. The dolls are holding bouquets of red roses like the real duo on the Behaviour album cover. The back cover of the 7-inch single pictured roses on a yellow background, while the 12-inch had a blue background.

== Music video ==
The video for "Was It Worth It?" was presented as a "good-time dance film" in a club setting with people in drag. Director Eric Watson was inspired by films like Saturday Night Fever and Hairspray as well as a visit to the moveable clubnight, Kinky Gerlinky. Footage of the duo performing at Heaven was intermixed with club scenes featuring a cast recruited from Kinky Gerlinky wearing extravagant costumes. Lowe appears in a tall orange hat from the women's line at Kenzo, doing nothing while the others are enjoying themselves.

== Critical reception ==
Upon its release as a single, Dave Jennings of Melody Maker noted "Was It Worth It?" had "the chunkiest, most muscular music to appear on a PSB track in a long time" and added that Tennant's vocal is "so fey, even by his standards, that it threatens to evaporate at any moment". He noted the song is "genuinely, surprisingly uplifting" as Tennant sings about "the usual Pet Shop themes [of] passion, regret and compromise, [but] from an unusually positive angle", and concluded it would be "a large and welcome hit". Barbara Ellen of NME felt the song was "not their best" and "sounds profoundly like a pastiche of every other song they've done before", but noted "its floor-scorching elegance, its deadpan distortion of The Love Song, and that daffy commitment they continue to have to everything sepia-tinted and forgotten". She also praised Tennant's vocals for "getting more accomplished with every record", adding that it's "nice to hear him singing about love and liberation in unveiled terms for once". Andy Kastanas from The Charlotte Observer wrote, "The sacred cow of disco never died for these guys (as evidenced by this song) and there's plenty of violins and a "hi-NRG" beat to prove it." Joe Brown from The Washington Post declared it as "a fierce disco anthem to rival "I Will Survive"."

== Track listings ==
All tracks are written by Neil Tennant and Chris Lowe.

- UK 7-inch single R 6306

A. "Was It Worth It?" – 4:22
B. "Miserablism" – 4:11

- US 7" single S7-57696 (jukebox edition) (Note: The A-side of this special edition jukebox single was mistakenly mastered with the non-vocal dub version. The B-side is mislabeled and is "Miserablism" (Electro mix) – 5:38.)

Tracks as listed on the label:
A. "Was It Worth It?" – 5:15
B. "Miserablism" – 4:11 (Note: Actual length is 5:38.)

- US 12-inch single VNR 56243

A1. "Was It Worth It?" (12") – 7:13
A2. "Was It Worth It?" (7") – 4:27
B1. "Miserablism" (Electro mix) – 5:38
B2. "Miserablism" – 4:11

- US CD single E2-56244
1. "Was It Worth It?" (7") – 4:27
2. "Was It Worth It?" (12") – 7:13
3. "Miserablism" (Electro mix) – 5:38
  - Remix by Moby
4. "Music for Boys" (Part 3) – 5:40
  - Remix by Altern 8
5. "Overture to Performance" – 6:14
- UK CD single CDR 6306
1. "Was It Worth It?" – 4:23
2. "Miserablism" (7") – 4:12
3. "Was It Worth It?" (12") – 7:13
4. "Was It Worth It?" (dub) – 5:16
  - Remix by Dave Seaman

== Personnel ==
Credits are adapted from the liner notes of Behaviour: Further Listening 1990–1991 and Catalogue.

Pet Shop Boys

- Chris Lowe
- Neil Tennant

Additional musicians

- Greg Bone – guitar
- Andy Duncan – percussion
- Scott Davidson – programming
- Pete Gleadall – programming (12-inch mix)
- Tessa Niles – additional vocals
- Carol Kenyon – additional vocals
- Ghida de Palma – additional vocals

Technical personnel

- Pet Shop Boys – production
- Brothers in Rhythm – production
- Paul Wright – engineering, mixing

Artwork

- Farrow/3a/Pet Shop Boys – design
- Toshima Tada – dolls
- Robert Shackleton – photography

== Charts ==
Weekly chart performance for "Was It Worth It?"
Chart (1991–1992)	Peak position
Australia (ARIA)	153
Europe (Eurochart Hot 100 Singles)	38
Finland (Suomen virallinen lista)	3
Germany (GfK)	19
Ireland (IRMA)	25
Netherlands (Dutch Top 40 Tipparade)	7
Netherlands (Single Top 100)	50
Sweden (Sverigetopplistan)	17
UK Singles (OCC)	24
UK Airplay (Music Week)	10
UK Dance (Music Week)	56

== Release history ==
Release dates and formats for "Was It Worth It?"
Region	Date	Format(s)	Label(s)	Ref(s).
United Kingdom	9 December 1991	7-inch vinyl; 12-inch vinyl; CD; cassette	Parlophone	
Australia	23 March 1992	12-inch vinyl; CD; cassette	Parlophone	
