= Dainton Connell =

English hooligan and bodyguard

- Born: 14 February 1961; Brighton, Sussex, England
- Died: 5 October 2007 (aged 46); Moscow, Russia
- Other names: Denton; The Bear
- Occupations: Bodyguard; minder; personal assistant; scaffolder
- Known for: Leading an Arsenal FC hooligan firm Working with the Pet Shop Boys
- Children: 2

Dainton Connell (14 February 1961 – 5 October 2007), known as "Denton" or "The Bear", was an English former hooligan. He was leader of one of the Arsenal's hooligan firms during the 1980s. Later in his life he served as a bodyguard, minder and personal assistant to the Pet Shop Boys, appearing on albums and in music videos by the duo.

== Biography ==
Connell was born in 1961 in Brighton, England to Jamaican parents. He left school at 16 and became a scaffolder. In 1977, he gained public attention after appearing in a television documentary presented by Janet Street-Porter about skinheads. During the 1980s, Connell was highly active in an Arsenal FC's hooligan "firm" and was a "main face" amongst the ranks. At the same time, he was influential in ensuring that the BNP – then trying to infiltrate football firms – failed to gain any foothold at Arsenal.

In the band's early years, Connell worked as a minder for Madness. He was employed as a bodyguard for the Pet Shop Boys' first tour in 1989. For the next eighteen years, he assisted the duo on tours and appeared in music videos, including "So Hard" and "Jealousy". He also provided additional vocals on "One and One Make Five" on their 1993 album Very. In 1997, Connell appeared as one of the subjects of Sam Taylor-Wood's piece Five Revolutionary Seconds XIII, after meeting whilst she was directing the Pet Shop Boys' residency at the Savoy Theatre. The same year, he was referenced in a flashback scene in the film Fever Pitch.

Connell had a wife, Mandy, and two daughters.

=== Death ===
Connell died aged 46 in a car crash in Moscow in October 2007. His funeral was held at the Mary Magdalene Church in Holloway Road and was attended by 3,000 people, including Janet Street-Porter, former Arsenal players Ian Wright and Lee Dixon, comedians Matt Lucas and David Walliams, artist Sam Taylor-Wood and boxer Frank Bruno.

The Pet Shop Boys also performed a benefit night for Connell's family at Heaven nightclub, called Can You Bear It?, alongside Suggs and Chas Smash of Madness, who had both been friends with Connell since he was 12.

In 2009, a plaque dedicated to Connell near the Emirates Stadium was removed by Islington Council, despite opposition from fans.
