= West End Girls (Swedish band) =

Swedish band

- Origin: Stockholm, Sweden
- Genre: Pet Shop Boys tribute
- Years active: 2003–2009
- Members: Isabelle Erkendal; Emmeli Erkendal
- Past members: Rosanna Jirebeck

West End Girls were a Swedish tribute synth-pop band performing cover versions of songs by English electronic/pop music act the Pet Shop Boys. Hailing from Stockholm, the duo originally consisted of Isabelle Erkendal and Rosanna Jirebeck, but Jirebeck left the group in 2008 and was replaced by Erkendal's cousin Emmeli Erkendal. Isabelle Erkendal provides main vocals for the band and is the "Neil Tennant" figure, whilst Jirebeck was behind her as "Chris Lowe", a capacity now filled by Emmeli Erkendal. West End Girls has been performing since 2003.

Unlike other cover bands, their style emulates the Pet Shop Boys rather than providing direct facsimiles. Their videos and photography echo elements seen in the Pet Shop Boys' own projects, such as industrial architecture, hats, dogs, costumes, gestures, etc., as well as techniques such as colourful lighting and mixing live action with computer graphics.

== Discography ==
=== Singles ===
In October 2005, they released a version of the Pet Shop Boys hit "Domino Dancing" which originally appeared on the Pet Shop Boys album Introspective. The single was produced by Johan Fjellström and debuted at number 6 in the Swedish single chart reaching a peak position of number 3.

In January 2006, their cover of "West End Girls", the track that inspired their name, was released.

A third single, their cover of "Suburbia", was released on 7 June. It also features on The Sims 2 expansion pack Pets, recorded in the game's "native" language, Simlish, and called "Booglurbia".

In December 2007, they announced through their blog that a new single would be released in February/March 2008. This was followed up on 9 January 2008, when Popjustice announced that the band's next two singles would be "What Have I Done to Deserve This?" (a cover of the Pet Shop Boys' duet with Dusty Springfield in which West End Girls will duet with Magnus Carlson from Weeping Willows) and "Little Black Dress" (a Pet Shop Boys written song that was due to be included in their 2001 musical Closer to Heaven but was not used and has not been released). "Little Black Dress" was eventually released in February 2009. "What Have I Done to Deserve This?" has been remixed by producer Nathan Heinze as an electro club mix.

=== Albums ===
West End Girls' debut album is called Goes Petshopping and it was released on 7 June 2006. In Japan, the album is called We Love Pet Shop Boys! and includes a bonus track, "Go West".

Their second album, Shoplifters, was announced in 2008, but was not released.

=== Other appearances ===
The West End Girls have also covered the Pet Shop Boys 1987 Christmas number one single, "Always on My Mind", which itself is a cover of the Brenda Lee / Elvis Presley track. The track appears on The Best Kids Christmas Album in the World Ever Ever Ever!!! Additionally, they covered the 1997 fan club-exclusive track "It Doesn't Often Snow at Christmas" for the 2008 Super Dance Christmas Party compilation album.
