= How Can You Expect to Be Taken Seriously? =

1991 single by Pet Shop Boys

- US CD single cover

Single by Pet Shop Boys

from the album Behaviour
- A-side: "Where the Streets Have No Name (I Can't Take My Eyes Off You)"
- B-side: "Bet She's Not Your Girlfriend"
- Released: 11 March 1991
- Genre: New jack swing
- Length: 3:55 (album version); 4:10 (single version)
- Label: Parlophone
- Songwriters: Chris Lowe; Neil Tennant
- Producers: Pet Shop Boys; Harold Faltermeyer

Pet Shop Boys singles chronology
"Being Boring" (1990)	"Where the Streets Have No Name (I Can't Take My Eyes Off You)" / "How Can You Expect to Be Taken Seriously?" (1991)	"Jealousy" (1991)

Music video
- "How Can You Expect to Be Taken Seriously?" on YouTube

"How Can You Expect to Be Taken Seriously?" is a song by English synth-pop duo Pet Shop Boys from their fourth studio album, Behaviour (1990). It was released in the United Kingdom on 11 March 1991 as a double A-side with "Where the Streets Have No Name (I Can't Take My Eyes Off You)", serving as the third single from Behaviour. For the single, Brothers in Rhythm remixed the track. The song was released as a solo single in the United States and France; it peaked at number 93 on the US Billboard Hot 100.

== Background and composition ==
"How Can You Expect to Be Taken Seriously?" is a "satire of late-eighties rock stars relentlessly saving the planet", according to lyricist Neil Tennant. The song addresses those who take on fashionable causes and trivialise them. In an interview for Record Mirror, Tennant was asked if it was written specifically about Sting; he replied that it was not about any one person but that he had several people in mind.

Pet Shop Boys were inspired to write a swingbeat song by the single "Every Little Step" by Bobby Brown. Tennant played power chords on guitar using a distortion box on the track.

== Release ==
"How Can You Expect to Be Taken Seriously?" was originally intended for solo release as the third single from Behaviour. After the second single, "Being Boring", peaked at number 20, breaking the duo's run of 10 consecutive top 10 songs, they decided they needed a release that was more likely to be a hit. The song was drastically remixed in a ragga style by Brothers in Rhythm, and it was included on a double A-side with a non-album cover version of U2's "Where the Streets Have No Name" in a medley with "Can't Take My Eyes Off You". It entered the UK Singles Chart at number seven on 23 March 1991 and peaked at number four the following week.

In the United States, "How Can You Expect to Be Taken Seriously?" was released separately in February 1991. A remix of "Being Boring", which had not been a single in the US, was included as an additional track. The release reached number 10 on Billboard's Hot Dance Music 12-inch Singles Sales chart.

Of interest to collectors, EMI USA commissioned dance DJ David Morales to create five remixes that were released to clubs and DJs on a limited promotion 12-inch. Morales would later work with the duo co-writing and co-producing the 1999 single "New York City Boy".

=== Artwork ===
The US single cover (pictured) featured a photograph of Tennant with sunglasses and a bouquet of flowers in the manner of a rock star. Chris Lowe is in the background. The picture was taken by Lawrence Watson at Narita Airport in Tokyo during the Pet Shop Boys' first tour in 1989. The UK double A-side single used an edited version of the same photo.

== Music video ==
The music video for "How Can You Expect to Be Taken Seriously?" was directed by Liam Kan. It featured street dancers Trevor Henry and Mark Martin, who also joined the Performance Tour, as well as several women posing in a white space. Lowe played keyboards and danced, wearing a red bobble hat with red glasses and a blue Champion hat with green glasses. Tennant's outfits included a BOY belt buckle and an Elvis Presley costume as he sang and lectured from a podium. A speeded-up version of the video was included at the beginning of the video for "Where the Streets Have No Name (I Can't Take My Eyes Off You)". The two complementary videos were filmed at the same time.

"How Can You Expect to Be Taken Seriously?" received heavy rotation on MTV Europe.

The version of the song used for the music video was also released on 7-inch vinyl and cassette single. Due to its playing time of 4:10 minutes, it is often confused with the similar "Perfect Attitude mix", which has an identical playing time, but a different introduction.

== Track listings ==
All tracks are written by Neil Tennant and Chris Lowe except where noted.

French 7-inch and cassette single
No.	Title	Writer(s)	Length
1.	"How Can You Expect to Be Taken Seriously?"		4:10
2.	"Where the Streets Have No Name (I Can't Take My Eyes Off You)" (7-inch edit)	Paul Hewson; David Evans; Larry Mullen; Adam Clayton; Bob Crewe; Bob Gaudio	4:33
Total length:			8:43

French 12-inch single
No.	Title	Writer(s)	Length
1.	"How Can You Expect to Be Taken Seriously?" (extended mix)		6:05
2.	"Where the Streets Have No Name (I Can't Take My Eyes Off You)" (extended mix)	Hewson; Evans; Mullen; Clayton; Crewe; Gaudio	8:43
3.	"Bet She's Not Your Girlfriend"		4:27
Total length:			19:15

French CD single
No.	Title	Writer(s)	Length
1.	"How Can You Expect to Be Taken Seriously?" (extended mix)		6:05
2.	"Where the Streets Have No Name (I Can't Take My Eyes Off You)" (7-inch full length mix)	Hewson; Evans; Mullen; Clayton; Crewe; Gaudio	5:37
3.	"Bet She's Not Your Girlfriend"		4:30
4.	"How Can You Expect to Be Taken Seriously?" (classical reprise)		3:05
Total length:			19:17

US CD single
No.	Title	Writer(s)	Length
1.	"How Can You Expect to Be Taken Seriously?" (original album version)		3:54
2.	"How Can You Expect to Be Taken Seriously?" (7-inch Perfect Attitude mix)		4:10
3.	"How Can You Expect to Be Taken Seriously?" (classical reprise)		3:05
4.	"It's Alright" (7-inch mix (Note: Mislabelled as the "Trevor Horn mix"))	Sterling Void; Marshall Jefferson; Paris Brightledge	4:18
5.	"We All Feel Better in the Dark"		3:59
6.	"Being Boring" (Marshall Jefferson 12-inch mix)		9:03
Total length:			28:29

US 12-inch single
No.	Title	Length
1.	"How Can You Expect to Be Taken Seriously?" (12-inch mix)	6:03
2.	"How Can You Expect to Be Taken Seriously?" (7-inch Perfect Attitude mix)	4:10
3.	"How Can You Expect to Be Taken Seriously?" (classical reprise)	3:05
4.	"Being Boring" (Marshall Jefferson 12-inch mix)	9:03
5.	"We All Feel Better in the Dark"	3:59
Total length:		26:20

US cassette single
No.	Title	Writer(s)	Length
1.	"How Can You Expect to Be Taken Seriously?"		3:54
2.	"What Have I Done to Deserve This?"	Tennant; Lowe; Allee Willis	4:17
Total length:			8:11

== Charts ==
Weekly chart performance for "How Can You Expect to Be Taken Seriously?"
Chart (1991)	Peak position
Europe (Eurochart Hot 100 Singles) with "Where the Streets Have No Name (I Can't Take My Eyes Off You)"	7
France (SNEP)	40
Ireland (IRMA) with "Where the Streets Have No Name (I Can't Take My Eyes Off You)"	2
UK Singles (Official Charts) with "Where the Streets Have No Name (I Can't Take My Eyes Off You)"	4
US Billboard Hot 100	93
US Dance Club Songs (Billboard)	19
US Dance Singles Sales (Billboard) with "Being Boring"	10
