= Domino Dancing =

1988 single by Pet Shop Boys

Single by Pet Shop Boys

from the album Introspective
- B-side: "Don Juan"
- Released: 12 September 1988
- Recorded: March 1988
- Studio: International Sound (Miami, Florida)
- Genre: Synth-pop; Latin pop; dance-pop; freestyle
- Length: 7:40 (album version); 4:18 (7-inch)
- Label: Parlophone
- Songwriters: Chris Lowe; Neil Tennant
- Producer: Lewis A. Martinée

Pet Shop Boys singles chronology
"Heart" (1988)	"Domino Dancing" (1988)	"Left to My Own Devices" (1988)

Music video
- "Domino Dancing" on YouTube

"Domino Dancing" is a song by English synth-pop duo Pet Shop Boys, released in September 1988 by Parlophone as the lead single from their third studio album, Introspective (1988). The song reached number seven on the UK Singles Chart and topped the charts in Finland and Spain. Its music video was directed by Eric Watson and filmed in Puerto Rico.

== Background ==
Written by Chris Lowe and Neil Tennant, and influenced by Latin pop, "Domino Dancing" was produced by Lewis A. Martinée, the Miami-based producer behind 1980s freestyle groups such as Exposé. The song was recorded at Martinée's studio in Miami, resulting in a large number of studio musicians being featured on it for a Pet Shop Boys song.

The duo had achieved three number ones in 1987 and 1988, and "Domino Dancing" was expected to continue this success. However, the public reception to the duo's new Latin sound proved disappointing. Tennant remembers: "...it entered the charts at number nine and I thought, 'that's that, then – it's all over'. I knew then that our imperial phase of number one hits was over."

The single peaked at number 18 on the Billboard Hot 100 as the duo's sixth top-20 entry in the United States. Though they have not since made top-60 on the Hot 100, the song did reach number 5 on the Billboard Hot Dance Club Play chart, where the duo has seen more consistent success.

== Critical reception ==
John Wilde from Melody Maker said, "After taking some delightless turns in recent months, Tennant and Lowe swoon, yup swoon, back with their most exquisite offering for many a moon. It looks as weightless as a kite up there. It comes complete with a spoken interlude that wakes up the glowworms inside me for the first time since that heavenly respite in the middle of Human League's 'Louise'." Pan-European magazine Music & Media wrote, "Their knack of creating irresistible synthesizer-driven pop songs never seems to diminish. Not their best, but still better than most of the competition." Jack Barron from NME named it Single of the Week, adding, "'Domino Dancing' perfectly captures the omnipresent power dynamics of an unbalanced relationship, which most are. It's a song of acid jealousy burning a hole in a love affair. An emotional Paradise reduced to Hell by the constant flick of a partner's eyes elsewhere in covert flirtation."

== Music video ==
The music video for "Domino Dancing" was directed by Eric Watson and was his sixth of eleven collaborations with the band.

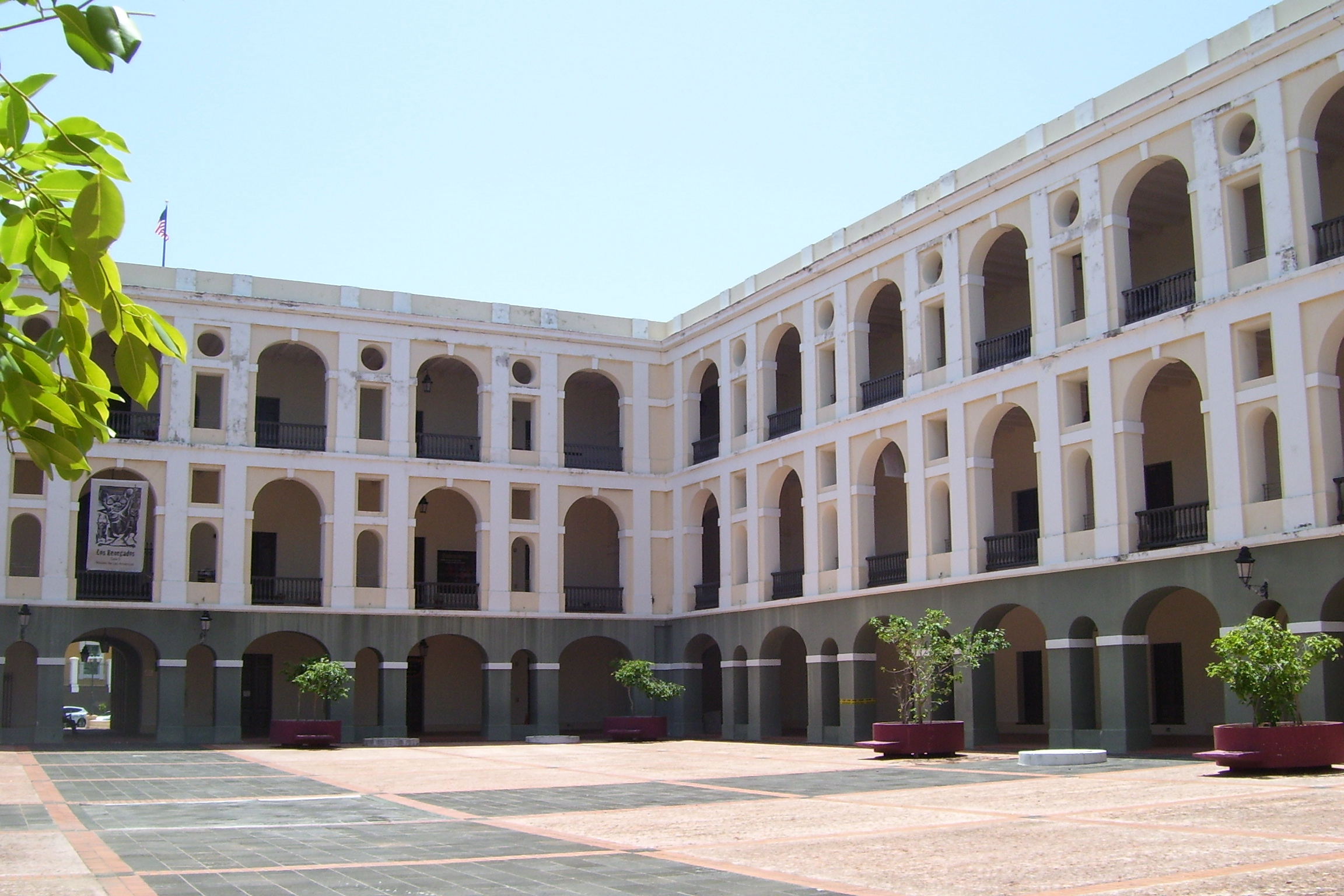
Some shots where the couple dance were inside the Ballajá Barracks, located in Old San Juan.

The storyline is about a love triangle between two handsome young men who are fighting over a beautiful woman. Rolling Stone magazine calls the video "probably the most homoerotic pop video ever made", citing the slow-motion shots of the boys wrestling on the beach:

As such, the video exemplified the mainstream exploitation of gay sex in the Eighties, most evident in Calvin Klein ads and feature films like Top Gun. Unfortunately, Domino Dancing was every bit as dishonest, titillating the straight world with images it could never acknowledge, then doubling the repression by keeping openly gay expression closeted.

— Jim Farber, Rolling Stone

The video was taped in about four days in the old colonial district of San Juan, Puerto Rico, in 1988. One of the locations that was featured in the music video is the Santa María Magdalena de Pazzis Cemetery.

All the lead actors were Puerto Rican; the two boys were David Boira and Adalberto Martinez Mojica and the girl was Donna Bottman, who was an aspiring actress and model. All of them were cast by the Pet Shop Boys.

Domino Dancing (extended version) is a seven-minute dance song, combined with Lowe's synth melodies, Cuban brass and hip hop beats.

Versions

- Domino Dancing (short video 7") – 4:18
- Domino Dancing (extended version 12" remix) – 7:46

Cast

- Chris Lowe as himself
- Neil Tennant as himself
- David Boira as Boy
- Adalberto Martinez Mojica as Boy
- Donna Bottman as Girl

== Track listings ==
- 7-inch, mini-CD, and US cassette single
1. "Domino Dancing" – 4:17
2. "Don Juan" – 3:53
- UK 12-inch, CD, and cassette single

Australian 12-inch single

1. "Domino Dancing" (disco mix) – 7:41
2. "Don Juan" (disco mix) – 7:32
3. "Domino Dancing" (alternative mix) – 4:42
- UK 12-inch remix single

A1. "Domino Dancing" (Base mix) – 5:53
B1. "Don Juan" (demo) – 4:19
B2. "Domino Dancing" (demo) – 4:45

- US 12-inch single
1. "Domino Dancing" (disco mix) – 7:41
2. "Domino Dancing" (single version) – 4:17
3. "Don Juan" (disco mix) – 7:32
4. "Domino Dancing" (alternative mix) – 4:45

== Personnel ==
Credits are adapted from the liner notes of the 7-inch single of "Domino Dancing".

Pet Shop Boys

- Chris Lowe
- Neil Tennant

Additional musicians

- Fro Sosa – additional keyboards
- Mike Bakst – additional keyboards, brass score
- Nestor Gomez – guitar
- Tony Concepción – trumpet
- Kenneth William Faulk – brass
- Dana Teboe – brass
- Ed Calle – brass
- Lewis A. Martinée – brass arrangement
- The Voice in Fashion – backing vocals

Technical personnel

- Lewis A. Martinée – production, mixing, engineering
- Pet Shop Boys – associate producers
- Mike Couzzi – engineering, mixing
- César Sogbe – assistant engineer
- Rick "Billy Bob" Alonso – mixing

Artwork

- Mark Farrow at Three Associates – design
- Pet Shop Boys – design
- Peter Andreas – photography

== Charts ==
=== Weekly charts ===
Weekly chart performance for "Domino Dancing"
Chart (1988–1989)	Peak position
Australia (ARIA)	36
Austria (Ö3 Austria Top 40)	19
Belgium (Ultratop 50 Flanders)	6
Canada Retail Singles (The Record)	9
Canada Top Singles (RPM)	17
Canada Dance/Urban (RPM)	2
Denmark (Tracklisten)	2
Europe (Eurochart Hot 100 Singles)	3
Finland (Suomen virallinen lista)	1
France (SNEP)	40
Ireland (IRMA)	4
Italy (Musica e dischi)	3
Italy Airplay (Music & Media)	2
Luxembourg (Radio Luxembourg)	3
Netherlands (Dutch Top 40)	7
Netherlands (Single Top 100)	9
New Zealand (Recorded Music NZ)	9
Norway (VG-lista)	5
Puerto Rico (UPI)	4
Quebec (ADISQ)	1
Spain (AFYVE)	1
Sweden (Sverigetopplistan)	6
Switzerland (Schweizer Hitparade)	5
UK Singles (Official Charts)	7
US Billboard Hot 100	18
US Alternative Airplay (Billboard)	22
US Dance Club Songs (Billboard)	5
US Dance Singles Sales (Billboard)	20
US Cash Box Top 100	21
West Germany (GfK)	3

=== Year-end charts ===
Year-end chart performance for "Domino Dancing"
Chart (1988)	Position
Belgium (Ultratop 50 Flanders)	58
Canada Dance/Urban (RPM)	4
Europe (Eurochart Hot 100 Singles)	50
Netherlands (Dutch Top 40)	63
UK Singles (Gallup)	88
West Germany (Media Control)	54

== Release history ==
Release dates and formats for "Domino Dancing"
Region	Date	Format(s)	Label(s)	Ref(s).
United Kingdom	12 September 1988	7-inch vinyl; 12-inch vinyl; cassette	Parlophone	
United Kingdom	19 September 1988	7-inch vinyl with sticker; 12-inch vinyl with sticker; CD	Parlophone	
United Kingdom	26 September 1988	12-inch remix vinyl	Parlophone	
Japan	9 October 1988	Mini-CD	EMI	

== Cover versions ==
The Swedish Pet Shop Boys tribute band West End Girls released a cover version of "Domino Dancing" in 2005 as a single from their album Goes Petshopping, peaking at number three on the Swedish Singles Chart.

On 17 April 2025, producer Lewis Martinée released his own version of "Domino Dancing" under the name DJ Martinee, with the original backing vocalists, The Voice In Fashion, and featuring Ray Guell & London Exchange.
