= Imperial phase =

Period of musician at their peak

The imperial phase is the period in which a musician is regarded to be at their commercial and creative peak.

== Origins ==
The phrase was coined by Neil Tennant of the Pet Shop Boys to describe their feelings on their career circa "Domino Dancing" (1988). It has since been applied by pop music critics and fans. For example, the Uncut journalist Michael Bonner identified 1973–1979 as Pink Floyd's imperial phase. While its original usage implied that an imperial phase was a one-time occurrence for a single artist, artists have been referred to as having multiple imperial phases. The term may also be applied to non-musical entities, such as film studios.

== Criteria ==
The Pitchfork critic Tom Ewing described three criteria for defining an artist's imperial phase: "command, permission, and self-definition". He defined "command" as the ability to push the boundaries of their medium in a way that produces lasting change; "permission" is the public's goodwill toward and interest in the artist's work; "self-definition" is the concept that the imperial phase defines the rest of the artist's career, and that future works will be compared to those from the imperial phase.

== See also ==
- Zeitgeist
