= Jealousy (Pet Shop Boys song) =

Single by Pet Shop Boys

from the album Behaviour
- B-side: "Losing My Mind"
- Written: 1982
- Released: 28 May 1991
- Genre: Synth-pop; symphonic pop
- Length: 4:47 (album version); 4:14 (7-inch version); 7:54 (extended mix)
- Label: Parlophone
- Songwriters: Chris Lowe; Neil Tennant
- Producers: Pet Shop Boys; Harold Faltermeyer

Pet Shop Boys singles chronology
"Where the Streets Have No Name (I Can't Take My Eyes Off You)" / "How Can You Expect to Be Taken Seriously?" (1991)	"Jealousy" (1991)	"DJ Culture" (1991)

"Jealousy" is a song originally written in 1982 by English synth-pop duo Pet Shop Boys, recorded for their fourth studio album, Behaviour (1990). It was released on 28 May 1991 by Parlophone as the album's fourth and final single in a slightly remixed form, which appears on the Pet Shop Boys' greatest hits albums. It reached number 12 on the UK Singles Chart. The song was performed by Robbie Williams at the Pet Shop Boys' 2006 BBC Radio 2 concert at the Mermaid Theatre, a recording of which was released on the Pet Shop Boys' live album Concrete.

== Background ==
"Jealousy" is the first proper song written by the Pet Shop Boys, and the earliest of their compositions to be recorded and released, according to Neil Tennant. In 1982, Chris Lowe composed the melody at the piano in his parents' home and, as he felt it should be a ballad, asked Tennant to write an intense-sounding lyric. Tennant complied by writing about the simplest form of jealousy: infidelity suspicions aroused by someone's indifferent or disrespectful attitudes towards another person's feelings (such as making his/her partner wait all night for a phone call which never comes). He was inspired by an old friend's jealousy about the amount of time he was spending with his new friend, Lowe.

"Jealousy" was among the first songs recorded by Tennant and Lowe in their demo sessions at Ray Roberts' London studio. They made another demo in 1986 for potential inclusion on Actually. Legendary film composer Ennio Morricone was approached to score the orchestral arrangement for the song. After a lengthy delay, Morricone passed on "Jealousy" but instead contributed a song that became "It Couldn't Happen Here". Producer Harold Faltermeyer ended up doing the arrangement when "Jealousy" was released on Behaviour.

== Versions ==
=== Pet Shop Boys ===
The album version, coming at the end of Behaviour, closed off the album with a sampler-based orchestral outro. The single version is slightly remixed, and uses a real orchestra instead during the outro. The extended version of the single version lengthens the outro while adding an orchestral intro as well; in addition, Neil Tennant recites a quote from William Shakespeare's Othello (Act III, Scene III) over both sequences:

Not poppy, nor mandragora,
Nor all the drowsy syrups of the world,
Shall ever medicine thee to that sweet sleep
Which thou owedst yesterday.

The extended version is also the arrangement performed live with Robbie Williams in 2006.

=== Other artists ===
Dubstar recorded "Jealousy" for a covers album produced for EMI's centennial anniversary. Their version is more sparsely arranged and comes to a full stop, with no additional instrumentation, with the last word of the lyrics.

"Jealousy" is also one of the songs covered on Goes Petshopping, the debut album by Pet Shop Boys tribute band West End Girls.

== B-side ==
"Losing My Mind", taken from the Stephen Sondheim musical Follies, was based on a demo originally recorded for the Liza Minnelli album Results. Its release here follows the releases of Minnelli's version on both Results and as the lead single from the album. As with the A-side, "Losing My Mind" was released in an extended mix (the "Disco mix") on the 12-inch single. The Disco Mix of "Losing My Mind" also appears on Introspective: Further Listening 1988–1989, which implies it was recorded between 1988 and 1989.

== Critical reception ==
Pan-European magazine Music & Media wrote, "Introducing Neil Tennant in a new role as balladeer. Different but still 'pet sounds' as usual." Barbara Ellen, writing for NME, described "Jealousy" as "a romantic ballad with a subtext viciously outlining the darker side of love". She added, "It flows along beautifully, made all the better for Tennant sounding less sure than usual, more open to the soul that shrieks inside."

== Track listings ==
- 7-inch: Parlophone / R 6283 (UK)
1. "Jealousy" (7-inch version) – 4:16
2. "Losing My Mind" (7-inch version) – 4:34
- CD: Parlophone / CD R 6283 (UK)
1. "Jealousy" (7-inch version) – 4:16
2. "Losing My Mind" (Disco Mix) – 6:07
3. "Jealousy" (Extended Mix) – 7:54
- CD: Parlophone / 20 4224 2 (UK)
1. "Jealousy" (7-inch version) – 4:16
2. "Losing My Mind" (7-inch version) – 4:34
3. "Losing My Mind" (Disco Mix) – 6:07
- CD: Parlophone / CDRS 6283 (UK)
1. "Jealousy" (Extended Mix) – 7:54
2. "This Must Be the Place I Waited Years to Leave" (Extended Mix) – 7:24
3. "So Hard" (Eclipse Mix) – 4:02
- Limited edition in digipak
- 12-inch: Parlophone / 12 R 6283 (UK)
1. "Jealousy" (Extended Mix) – 7:54
2. "Losing My Mind" (Disco Mix) – 6:08

== Charts ==
Weekly chart performance for "Jealousy"
Chart (1991)	Peak position
Australia (ARIA)	147
Europe (Eurochart Hot 100)	19
Europe (European Hit Radio)	13
Finland (Suomen virallinen lista)	4
Germany (GfK)	20
Ireland (IRMA)	8
Luxembourg (Radio Luxembourg)	8
Spain (AFYVE)	19
Switzerland (Schweizer Hitparade)	14
UK Singles (Official Charts)	12
UK Airplay (Music Week)	5

== Release history ==
Release dates and formats for "Jealousy"
Region	Date	Format(s)	Label(s)	Ref(s).
United Kingdom	28 May 1991	7-inch vinyl; 12-inch vinyl; CD; cassette	Parlophone	
Australia	12 August 1991	7-inch vinyl; 12-inch vinyl; CD; cassette	Parlophone	
