= Where the Streets Have No Name (I Can't Take My Eyes Off You) =

1991 single by Pet Shop Boys

Single by Pet Shop Boys
- A-side: "How Can You Expect to Be Taken Seriously?"
- B-side: "Bet She's Not Your Girlfriend"
- Released: 11 March 1991
- Genre: Hi-NRG
- Length: 4:31; 6:44 (extended mix)
- Label: Parlophone
- Songwriters: Paul Hewson; David Evans; Larry Mullen; Adam Clayton; Bob Gaudio; Bob Crewe
- Producers: Pet Shop Boys; Julian Mendelsohn

Pet Shop Boys singles chronology
"Being Boring" (1990)	"Where the Streets Have No Name (I Can't Take My Eyes Off You)" / "How Can You Expect to Be Taken Seriously?" (1991)	"Jealousy" (1991)

Music video
- "Where the Streets Have No Name (I Can't Take My Eyes Off You)" on YouTube

"Where the Streets Have No Name (I Can't Take My Eyes Off You)" is a song by English synth-pop duo Pet Shop Boys. The song is a medley of U2's "Where the Streets Have No Name" and "Can't Take My Eyes Off You", a 1967 song by Frankie Valli, though in an arrangement informed by the 1982 disco version of the song by the Boys Town Gang rather than the original. The song accompanied "How Can You Expect to Be Taken Seriously?", the third single from their fourth studio album, Behaviour (1990), as a double A-side in the United Kingdom (both singles were released separately in the United States). Released in March 1991 by Parlophone, the song became the duo's 15th consecutive top-20 entry in the UK, peaking at number four on the UK Singles Chart.

== Background and content ==
Chris Lowe had the idea for the unusual mashup, realising that "you could sing the one going into the other", while recording "I'm Not Scared" with Patsy Kensit for her band, Eighth Wonder. Lowe and Neil Tennant then noticed that "the guitar on U2's record sounded like a sequencer". The duo intended to record it with Eighth Wonder as a follow-up to "I'm Not Scared"; instead, they recorded it themselves several years later, as they "needed a big hit. It was absolutely shameless." Having "turn[ed] a mythic rock song into a stomping disco record", the duo considered recording a full EP of hi-NRG covers of rock songs, including "Stairway to Heaven".

The Pet Shop Boys version differs significantly from that of U2 in its musical arrangement. In contrast to the U2 version's instrumental build-up, the Pet Shop Boys version opens abruptly with synthesized and sampled noises and a drum machine. The musical climax of the song is also changed in other elements; a background vocal sample of "burning down love" is played right at the start, and synthesised horns erupt with even higher notes immediately following each chorus. Tennant performs the lyrics with no vocal exertion or stresses, in contrast to Bono's performance. In addition, at the transition between "Where the Streets Have No Name" and "Can't Take My Eyes Off You", Tennant sings the two lines one after the other, with no change in pitch, demonstrating the similarities in the two songs.

The single's other A-side, "How Can You Expect to Be Taken Seriously?", criticises the insincere humanitarian messages of a number of pop stars during the 1980s and the institutionalization of rock and roll. The band noted that "one song is about rock stars so to have a U2 song with it serves as a further comment."

== Reception and legacy ==
Following the release of the single, U2 joked, "What have we done to deserve this?", referring to a Pet Shop Boys song. Tennant mentioned to The People in 2002 that he had "managed at long last to patch things up with Bono" after meeting him at one of Elton John's homes in the south of France.

James Brown from NME said, "Here they shake out the old U2 blanket and give it a good beating, splashing in some music hall camp, and a finale of fuzzy hard rock guitar. This is cool, happy music, no-one else take the piss quite so shockingly." Nick Duerden from Record Mirror wrote, "A bizarre mixture of two completely different songs, on paper it reads like a painful nightmare. But on record, it gels rather well. Neil and Chris' Hi-NRG treatment of both tracks run ridiculously smoothly with added eloquence, forcing even the Boys' detractors to give credit where it's due. Carry on camping."

== Live performances and recordings ==
To date, the Pet Shop Boys have performed the song live on seven of their tours. The song was included in the main set list for 1991's Performance Tour; a recording from the Birmingham NEC in June 1991 was released on the video Performance. The VHS edition of the concert omitted the "Can't Take My Eyes Off You" section due to a publishing issue, but the complete soundtrack was later restored to the DVD version in 2004.

The song was performed at some shows of the 1994 Discovery tour, though not the show in Rio de Janeiro released on Discovery: Live in Rio 1994. It also appeared on the 2002 Release Tour, the 2004 summer/fall shows and the 2006 Fundamental Tour, of which a performance filmed in Mexico City on 14 November was included on the 2007 DVD Cubism. Most recently, it was performed on the 2022–24 Dreamworld: The Greatest Hits Live tour, and in the 2026 version of the Viña del Mar International Song Festival in Chile.

== Track listings ==
- UK 7-inch and cassette single
- Australian 7-inch and cassette single
1. "Where the Streets Have No Name (I Can't Take My Eyes Off You)" (7-inch edit) – 4:33
2. "How Can You Expect to Be Taken Seriously?" – 4:10
- UK 12-inch single
1. "Where the Streets Have No Name (I Can't Take My Eyes Off You)" (extended mix) – 6:44
2. "How Can You Expect to Be Taken Seriously?" (extended mix) – 6:03
3. "Bet She's Not Your Girlfriend" – 4:28
- UK 12-inch single (remixes)
1. "Where the Streets Have No Name (I Can't Take My Eyes Off You)" (David Morales remix) – 6:24
2. "How Can You Expect to Be Taken Seriously?" (Mo Mo remix) – 6:51
3. "How Can You Expect to Be Taken Seriously?" (Ragga Zone remix) – 6:27
- UK CD single
1. "Where the Streets Have No Name (I Can't Take My Eyes Off You)" – 5:35
2. "How Can You Expect to Be Taken Seriously?" (extended mix) – 6:03
3. "Bet She's Not Your Girlfriend" – 4:28
4. "How Can You Expect to Be Taken Seriously?" (classical reprise) – 3:05
- US 12-inch single
1. "Where the Streets Have No Name (I Can't Take My Eyes Off You)" (12-inch dance mix) – 7:35
2. "Where the Streets Have No Name (I Can't Take My Eyes Off You)" (Sound Factory mix) – 4:37
3. "Where the Streets Have No Name (I Can't Take My Eyes Off You)" (Red Zone mix) – 6:18
4. "Where the Streets Have No Name (I Can't Take My Eyes Off You)" (Eclipse mix) – 1:38
5. "Where the Streets Have No Name (I Can't Take My Eyes Off You)" (Ska reprise) – 2:59
6. "Where the Streets Have No Name (I Can't Take My Eyes Off You)" (7-inch version) – 4:33
- US and Canadian CD single
1. "Where the Streets Have No Name (I Can't Take My Eyes Off You)" (original 7-inch mix) – 4:33
2. "Where the Streets Have No Name (I Can't Take My Eyes Off You)" (12-inch dance mix) – 7:35
3. "Where the Streets Have No Name (I Can't Take My Eyes Off You)" (Red Zone mix) – 6:18
4. "Bet She's Not Your Girlfriend" – 4:27
5. "I Want a Dog" (Techno Funk mix) – 4:06
- US and Canadian cassette single
1. "Where the Streets Have No Name (I Can't Take My Eyes Off You)" (original 7-inch) – 4:31
2. "Bet She's Not Your Girlfriend" – 4:28

== Charts ==
=== Weekly charts ===
Weekly chart performance for "Where the Streets Have No Name (I Can't Take My Eyes Off You)"
Chart (1991)	Peak position
Australia (ARIA)	9
Austria (Ö3 Austria Top 40)	5
Belgium (Ultratop 50 Flanders)	8
Europe (Eurochart Hot 100) with "How Can You Expect to Be Taken Seriously?"	7
Europe (European Hit Radio)	5
Finland (Suomen virallinen lista)	2
Germany (GfK)	7
Ireland (IRMA)	2
Italy (Musica e dischi) with "How Can You Expect to Be Taken Seriously?"	4
Luxembourg (Radio Luxembourg)	3
Netherlands (Dutch Top 40)	13
Netherlands (Single Top 100)	14
New Zealand (Recorded Music NZ)	42
Spain (AFYVE)	2
Sweden (Sverigetopplistan)	13
Switzerland (Schweizer Hitparade)	3
UK Singles (Official Charts) with "How Can You Expect to Be Taken Seriously?"	4
UK Airplay (Music Week)	5
UK Dance (Music Week) with "How Can You Expect to Be Taken Seriously?"	25
US Billboard Hot 100	72
US Dance Club Songs (Billboard)	4
US Dance Singles Sales (Billboard)	3
US Cash Box Top 100	81

=== Year-end charts ===
Year-end chart performance for "Where the Streets Have No Name (I Can't Take My Eyes Off You)"
Chart (1991)	Position
Belgium (Ultratop)	78
Europe (European Hit Radio)	52
Germany (Media Control)	57
Sweden (Topplistan)	73
UK Singles (OCC)	84
US 12-inch Singles Sales (Billboard)	22
US Dance Club Play (Billboard)	46

== Release history ==
Release dates and formats for "Where the Streets Have No Name (I Can't Take My Eyes Off You)"
Region	Date	Format(s)	Label(s)	Ref(s).
United Kingdom	11 March 1991	7-inch vinyl; 12-inch vinyl; CD	Parlophone	
Australia	22 April 1991	7-inch vinyl; 12-inch vinyl; cassette	Parlophone	
Japan	17 May 1991	Mini-CD	EMI	
