= Ray Guell =

American singer

Raymond Guell, better known as Ray Guell, is an American singer and composer of freestyle music. His biggest hits in music are "Love Will Come" and "Love Is the Answer", which reached numbers 22 and 32 respectively on the US Billboard Dance Club Songs chart.

== Discography ==
=== Albums ===
Title	Details
Inspiration	Released: 1996; Label: Groovy Tunes

=== Singles ===
Year	Title	Positions
Year	Title	US Dance
1989	"Just Another Lover"	—
1992	"You Took My Heart"	—
1993	"Can U Feel"	—
1995	"Givin' Up"	—
1996	"Inspiration"	—
1997	"Déjame (Let Me Go)"	—
1998	"Love Will Come"	22
2010	"Love Is the Answer"	32
2011	"You Don't Know Me"	—
2019	"Don't Wanna Cry"	16
"—" denotes a release that did not chart.
