= Sally Bradshaw =

British high mezzo-soprano

- Born: Sally Bradshaw; London, England
- Genres: Pop, Classical
- Occupations: Operatic soprano, writer
- Years active: 1979–present
- Website: Songful.net

Sally Bradshaw is a British high mezzo-soprano who made a career principally as a Baroque specialist in opera and concerts. As a solo artist she has made a number of recordings and performed worldwide. She has also collaborated with many artists in classical and popular genres.

== Background and career ==
Bradshaw gained a Cambridge degree in English and then studied singing at the Guildhall, London, and in Paris with Régine Crespin. She sings the title role in the recording of Handel's Agrippina, a world premiere for Harmonia Mundi, which was Sunday Times Record of the Year and Opera Now! Record of the Month. She recorded the role with Nicholas McGegan during the Göttingen Festival production.

With the same conductor she has performed five other roles in performances in the USA and Europe. Bradshaw has made more than 20 appearances in Germany and Austria in opera, concerts and recordings. She sang Handel's Alcina at the Halle and Berlin Potsdam festivals, a live broadcast of Hasse's Piramo e Tisbe from the Musikverein, Vienna; the live recording of the world premiere of Cestiís Il Pomodoro at the Hofburg, (Royal Palace) Vienna; concerts and recordings for the International Haydn Festival at Eisenstadt and the premiere of Scarlatti's Gli Equivoci nel Sembiante for the Innsbruck Festival. Bradshaw performed with baroque groups from London Baroque, to The Parley of Instruments, Opera Restor’d, The Monteverdi Choir and Orchestra, Chiaroscuro, Les Musiciens du Louvre, Tafelmusik, Les Saqueboutiers de Toulouse and many other groups. Venues at which she appeared include The Royal Opera House, Covent Garden and the Concertgebouw, Amsterdam

Bradshaw has performed vocals for many popular bands, such as Pet Shop Boys, Art of Noise and Marc Almond, as well as on Mike Oldfield's Tubular Bells II. Sally opened the 1998 MTV Europe Music Awards ceremony in Milan with the band Faithless, and contributed a moment of relative sanity to the otherwise brilliantly bizarre The KLF's Fuck the Millennium comeback gig. Bradshaw also performed vocals for A. R. Rahman in a Bollywood film, Dil Se... Bradshaw won a drama award at the Edinburgh Festival for the musical play Maria Malibran, "Bright Star in a Dark Sky" which she co-wrote and starred in, singing Bellini and Rossini arias.

Bradshaw is a founding member of the group Words and Music which creates entertainments with readings on particular themes. Actors who have worked with her include Prunella Scales, Timothy and Samuel West, Eleanor Bron, John Julius Norwich, Rowan Williams and Alexander McCall Smith. The group has toured worldwide for the British Council doing three Far Eastern tours.

Bradshaw teaches regularly at Cambridge University where she is a senior member of Lucy Cavendish. She has run Vocal Summer schools in Malta for the International University there, and run master classes in Florence. She has taught at the Music Academy of the West in Montecito, USA and runs residential courses, notably in the Scottish Highlands and in South West France.

Bradshaw has often spoken on BBC Radio: as panellist in Wordly Wise, In Tune, Matters of Taste and on The Food Programme. She fronted a Channel 4 documentary on deceptions in the food advertising business. Throughout her singing career writing has gone alongside, and she has written a musical guidebook to Austria for the AA, and has published articles in all the main newspapers: The Independent, The Daily Mail, The Daily Telegraph, Sunday Times, The Times and Evening Standard, and contributed articles to The Singer as well as Harpers.

== Recordings ==
- Handel. Agrippina. (HWV 6, Venice 1709–10). Harmonia Mundi HMC 907063/65
- Delius. Irmelin – An Opera in three acts. (Voice in the air) BBC Recording 1984
- Amadis. Lully. (Oriane). BBC recording
- Okeanos Reflections
- Ancestral Voices KPM EMI
- Cesti. Il pomo d'oro, Vienna 1989
- Campra. L'Europe Galante. Versailles. 1993. Conducted by Marc Minkowski
- Scarlatti. Gli equivoci nel sembiante. 1988. Conducted by Charles Medlam.
- The Soul of Orpheus. Songful Records
- Mike Oldfield. Tubular Bells II. Vocals
- Pet Shop Boys. Introspective. Vocals
- Marc Almond. The Days of Pearly Spencer. Vocals
- Art of Noise. The Seduction of Claude Debussy. Vocals
- The KLF. Fuck the Millennium. Vocals
