= It's Alright (Pet Shop Boys song) =

1989 single by Pet Shop Boys

Single by Pet Shop Boys

from the album Introspective
- B-side: "One of the Crowd"; "Your Funny Uncle"
- Released: 26 June 1989
- Genre: House; synth-pop
- Length: 9:23 (album version); 4:18 (7-inch version); 4:47 (10-inch remix)
- Label: Parlophone
- Songwriters: Sterling Void; Marshall Jefferson (Note: Only Sterling Void is credited as a songwriter on original pressings of Introspective and "It's Alright". Starting in 2001, Pet Shop Boys releases featuring the song also credit Marshall Jefferson and Paris Brightledge for songwriting.); Paris Brightledge
- Producer: Trevor Horn

Pet Shop Boys singles chronology
"Left to My Own Devices" (1988)	"It's Alright" (1989)	"So Hard" (1990)

"It's All Right"

Single by Sterling Void and Paris Brightledge
- Released: 1987
- Genre: House; Chicago house; deep house; pop-soul
- Length: 6:50
- Label: D.J. International Records
- Songwriters: Sterling Void; Paris Brightledge
- Producers: Sterling Void; Marshall Jefferson

"It's Alright" is a song recorded by English synth-pop duo Pet Shop Boys, released on 26 June 1989 as the third and final single from their third studio album, Introspective (1988). It reached number five on the UK Singles Chart. Written and originally recorded by Sterling Void and Paris Brightledge, the song came to the attention of Pet Shop Boys on a compilation of house music from DJ International Records issued by FFRR Records in 1988.

The lyrics list a wide variety of serious political issues in the headlines at the time ("Dictation enforced in Afghanistan, revolution in South Africa taking a stand…"), and then offer the positive message of the title—that on its "timeless wavelength", "music is our life's foundation", it "shall last" and ultimately "succeed all the nations to come".

== Background and composition ==
Sterling Void worked on "It's All Right" (as it was originally spelled) with producer Marshall Jefferson. They brought in Paris Brightledge, who wrote the lyrics and also sang on the track. The song was recorded and mixed over two days at a Chicago recording studio. Record Mirror described their original version as "a deep house anthem of blissful quality, emotional singing from Paris Brightledge and an optimistic scenario of music as the vanquisher of war and oppression".

"It's All Right" was released as a single by DJ International Records in 1987. The track was also included on the compilation album The House Sound of Chicago: Vol. III – Acid Tracks, which was released in the UK by FFRR Records in January 1988. Pet Shop Boys purchased this compilation and "absolutely loved" the song "It's All Right". They suggested to producer Trevor Horn that he record it with the female a cappella group The Mint Juleps but subsequently decided to cover it themselves for their album Introspective.

== Versions ==
The Pet Shop Boys version on Introspective closely follows the original by Void and Brightledge, although Neil Tennant added the words "I hope" to the assertion "it's gonna be alright", based on discussions with producer Trevor Horn about the meaning of the song. Tennant observed, "My understanding is that the song goes from uncertainty to optimism". "It's Alright" is the last song on Introspective, and with a length of nine minutes and 26 seconds, it is the longest track on the album and is the Pet Shop Boys' longest track across all albums the band has released as of 2025. (Note: The non-album single "Cricket Wife" (2021) is their longest song at 9:59 as of 2025.)

The single version was significantly remixed by Horn, with additional keyboard work by George De Angelis. Tennant wrote a new second verse that expands the song's concerns beyond the purely political into environmental issues. The 10-inch single included an earlier version with the line "there's a boy standing by a river, there's a girl lying with her lover, there's a statesman standing at a crossroads, there's a soldier polishing his gun", which was removed from the main single because they decided it sounded pretentious. All three versions appear on the reissue Introspective: Further Listening 1988–1989.

== Release ==
Pet Shop Boys decided to release "It's Alright" as a single in June 1989 as a follow-up to their number four hit "Left to My Own Devices" from November of the previous year. EMI Records executives and the duo's manager Tom Watkins were opposed to the idea, but Chris Lowe persuaded them to agree because he felt strongly about the song. It was their seventh single to debut in the top ten, coming in at number five.

Sterling Void remixed the Pet Shop Boys recording on the second 12-inch single, titled the "DJ International Mixes".

=== Artwork ===
The single cover (pictured) shows Lowe wearing an ophthalmic trial frame, a device that holds corrective lenses during eye tests. A picture of Tennant (without glasses) was used on the back of the 7-inch and 12-inch singles. The photos were taken by Eric Watson, with make-up by Pierre LaRoche. Limited editions had a black bellyband with the title information in fluorescent lettering. The 10-inch cover was black with the same lettering and included a poster insert. The remix singles had a fluorescent pink front and a green back cover. Designer Mark Farrow chose the colours for an acid house look.

=== Additional releases ===
In January 1989, following the song's inclusion on Introspective but before its release as a single, Sterling Void's original version was re-issued as a B-side to his song "Runaway Girl" and reached number 53 on the UK singles chart.

Hercules and Love Affair covered the track on their 2011 album Blue Songs.

== Critical reception ==
Jerry Smith from Music Week wrote, "Seemingly always popping up in the right place at the right time, Tennant and Lowe comment on the world's ills with a perky disco beat and lush synth backing with yet another seductively memorable lyric. Wide exposure is assured". Robin Smith of Record Mirror described "It's Alright" as a "Technicoloured panorama" and "the sort of single you should wallow in on your headphones". Harriet Dell from Smash Hits commented, "'It's Alright' was originally recorded by a bloke called Sterling Void and was a largish club hit last year. It includes the tinkling piano, the P.S.B's famous synthesised string pluckings and Neil Tennant's plaintive voice. He "wails" on about how the trees and flowers are being destroyed, how people eventually have to die, but the music lasts forever. It's a really "big" arrangement but somehow the excitement of Sterling Void's original has been flattened out".

== Music video ==
The music video features the duo surrounded by numerous babies. Lowe came up with the idea to reflect the song's message about future generations. Director Eric Watson filmed the video in black and white, with lighting inspired by Robert Mapplethorpe, so that the babies appear to glow against the black background and leather jackets worn by the duo. There were 110 babies involved in the production, including Watson's son Eugene, who sat on Lowe's lap.

== Live performances ==
Pet Shop Boys played "It's Alright" on their 1989 tour at the time of the single's release. The song was performed on the Nightlife Tour (1999–2000) and was included in the concert film Montage. "It's Alright" also appears on the live album, Concrete (2006), with opera singer Sally Bradshaw reprising her vocals from the single, backed by the BBC Concert Orchestra. The hit song was included on the set list of the Dreamworld: The Greatest Hits Live tour that began in 2022.

== Track listings ==
- 7-inch and cassette single
1. "It's Alright" – 4:18
2. "One of the Crowd" – 3:54
3. "Your Funny Uncle" – 2:16
- 10-inch single

A. "It's Alright" (alternative mix) – 4:46
B. "It's Alright" (extended dance mix) – 10:34

- 12-inch single

A1. "It's Alright" (extended version) – 8:47
B1. "One of the Crowd" – 3:54
B2. "Your Funny Uncle" – 2:16

- 12-inch remix single
1. "It's Alright" (the Tyree mix) – 8:55
2. "It's Alright" (the Sterling Void mix) – 5:34
- CD single
1. "It's Alright" (seven-inch version) – 4:18
2. "One of the Crowd" – 3:54
3. "Your Funny Uncle" – 2:16
4. "It's Alright" (extended version) – 8:47

== Personnel ==
Personnel are adapted from the liner notes of Introspective: Further Listening 1988–1989.

Pet Shop Boys

- Chris Lowe
- Neil Tennant

=== Album version ===
Additional vocalists

- Judy Bennett
- Sharon Blackwell
- H. Robert Carr
- Mario Friendo
- Derek Green
- Michael Hoyte
- Herbie Joseph
- Paul Lee
- Gee Morris
- Dee Ricketts
- Iris Sutherland
- Yvonne White

Additional personnel

- Trevor Horn – production
- Stephen Lipson – production, engineering

=== 10-inch version ===
Additional vocalists

- Tessa Niles
- Sally Bradshaw

Additional personnel

- Trevor Horn – production
- Stephen Lipson – production, engineering
- Julian Mendelsohn – mixing, engineering
- Pet Shop Boys – production

=== 7-inch version ===
Additional vocalists

- Tessa Niles
- Sally Bradshaw

Additional personnel

- Trevor Horn – production
- Pete Schwier – engineering
- Steve Fitzmaurice – assistant engineer
- George De Angelis – keyboard programming

=== Artwork ===
- Mark Farrow – design
- Eric Watson – photography

== Charts ==
=== Weekly charts ===
Weekly chart performance for "It's Alright"
Chart (1989)	Peak position
Australia (ARIA)	70
Austria (Ö3 Austria Top 40)	27
Belgium (Ultratop 50 Flanders)	17
Europe (Eurochart Hot 100 Singles)	9
Finland (Suomen virallinen lista)	4
Ireland (IRMA)	2
Italy (Musica e dischi)	19
Italy Airplay (Music & Media)	10
Luxembourg (Radio Luxembourg)	2
Netherlands (Dutch Top 40 Tipparade)	9
Netherlands (Single Top 100)	41
Spain (AFYVE)	20
Switzerland (Schweizer Hitparade)	15
UK Singles (Official Charts)	5
West Germany (GfK)	3

=== Year-end charts ===
Year-end chart performance for "It's Alright"
Chart (1989)	Position
West Germany (Media Control)	52
