= Sterling Void =

American house musician (born 1964)

- Born: Duane Pelt; Chicago, Illinois, United States
- Genres: House, Chicago house
- Occupations: DJ, producer
- Instruments: Drum machine Synthesizer; Electronic keyboard Sequencer
- Years active: 1987–present

Sterling Void (born 1964) is an American house musician.

== Biography ==
Void was an early innovator in the Chicago house music scene. He is mostly known for his song with Paris Brightledge called "It's All Right" released in 1987 on D.J. International Records. In 1988, he released another successful track called "Runaway Girl".

In 1988, "It's All Right" gained greater exposure when it was covered by Pet Shop Boys on its Introspective album and released as a single. Sterling Void himself was tapped to do a remix of this production. Furthermore, the Pet Shop Boys version led to the original version by Sterling Void being re-issued, and it eventually reached number 53 in the UK singles chart.

In the 2010s, Sterling Void released new records. In 2012, he released a track featuring Questions called "Vibes" on Edit Records. The same year he produced a song called "Rise" with Layla on the vocals, and another track with Trevor Mako called "Hold On". In 2013, he released the song "Tell Me" with the vocalist Jérome.
