= So Hard =

1990 single by Pet Shop Boys

Single by Pet Shop Boys

from the album Behaviour
- B-side: "It Must Be Obvious"
- Released: 24 September 1990
- Studio: Red Deer (Munich, West Germany)
- Genre: Synth-pop; disco; orchestral pop
- Length: 3:56; 6:30 (extended mix)
- Label: Parlophone
- Songwriters: Chris Lowe; Neil Tennant
- Producers: Pet Shop Boys; Harold Faltermeyer

Pet Shop Boys singles chronology
"It's Alright" (1989)	"So Hard" (1990)	"Being Boring" (1990)

Music video
- "So Hard" on YouTube

"So Hard" is a song by English synth-pop duo Pet Shop Boys, released in September 1990 as the lead single from their fourth studio album, Behaviour (1990). The song is about "two people living together; they are totally unfaithful to each other but they both pretend they are faithful and then catch each other out". It peaked at No. 4 in the United Kingdom and reached the top three in at least seven European countries, including Finland, where it reached No. 1.

== Background ==
Chris Lowe said the original version of "So Hard" was "harping back to Giorgio Moroder with loads of all these retro instruments. Then David Morales took the chord progression from the middle section and made this classic pumping house track. It's quite funny, because we did this gig in Los Angeles and Frankie Knuckles played this track at the party afterwards. Neil came over and said, 'Why don't we make records like this?' I said, 'Neil, it is us.' So that's how much we know about dance music!"

== Critical reception ==
Larry Flick from Billboard felt that "So Hard" "maintains the fun and frothy disco melodrama of past efforts, while striking enough of a modern pop stance to encourage alternative and top 40 radio airplay." James Muretich from Calgary Herald said the song, "about a couple faithfully unfaithful to each other", "reflect a detached sadness set against a dreamy synthesizer background that barely sashays across the dancefloor." Liverpool Echo stated, "It might be called "So Hard" but the Pet Shop Boys make it all sound so easy. That's probably why people think they're too clever for their own good. But they do make excellent pop records. This is typical Pet Shop Boys despite the change of producer: Brash disco backing, dry sophisticated singing and a great tune."

Paul Lester from Melody Maker named it Single of the Week, writing, "Notwithstanding the radar signals, laser beams and acidic bleeps which squiggle at the start, "So Hard" is immediately, unmistakably Pet Shop Boys." Pan-European magazine Music & Media commented, "All radio formats unite! This commercial pop single - featuring that typically inescapable chorus - is the logical choice for any sensible programmer." Nick Robinson from Music Week said, "A welcome return, this time with Harold 'Axel F' Faltermeyer co-producing, and a typical semi-orchestral pop song with those familiar heavy dance beats and another catchy chorus." Roger Morton from NME wrote that "So Hard" is "familiar Pet Shoppies territory", with its "superior hit factory pulse, boys town keyboard slashes and darkly tainted love-lyric."

== Music video ==
The accompanying music video for the song was directed by Eric Watson and filmed in Newcastle and North Tyneside. Filming locations included the Bigg Market, Newcastle Quayside, Railway Terrace in Wallsend, Byker, Whitley Bay and the Tyne and Wear Metro. The black and white video co-stars Paul Gascoigne's sister Anna Gascoigne and features Dainton Connell. The video also shows people dancing and having fun on the streets with Tennant and Lowe in the background.

== Track listing ==
The single's B-side is "It Must Be Obvious", with the US release also featuring the remix of "Paninaro", which was originally released on Disco. Remixes were done by Julian Mendelsohn, the KLF and David Morales. The KLF remixed "So Hard" and "It Must Be Obvious", available on the "So Hard (The KLF vs Pet Shop Boys)" single.

- Standard 7-inch and cassette single
1. "So Hard" – 3:56
2. "It Must Be Obvious" – 4:21
- UK 12-inch single

A1. "So Hard" (extended dance mix) – 6:30
A2. "It Must Be Obvious" – 4:21
B1. "So Hard" (dub mix) – 7:30

- UK 12-inch single (The KLF vs Pet Shop Boys)

A. "So Hard" (The KLF vs. Pet Shop Boys) – 5:27
B. "It Must Be Obvious" (UFO mix) – 9:22

- UK CD single
1. "So Hard" – 3:56
2. "It Must Be Obvious" – 4:21
3. "So Hard" (extended dance mix) – 6:30
- German maxi-CD single
1. "So Hard" (12-inch remix) – 6:13
2. "So Hard" (radio mix) – 3:22
3. "So Hard" (Red Zone mix) – 6:45
4. "So Hard" (Eclipse mix) – 3:40
- US 12-inch and maxi-cassette single

A1. "So Hard" (extended dance mix) – 6:30
A2. "So Hard" (single) – 3:56
B1. "So Hard" (dub) – 7:30
B2. "It Must Be Obvious" – 4:21

- US maxi-CD single
1. "So Hard" (extended dance mix) – 6:30
2. "So Hard" (single) – 3:56
3. "So Hard" (dub) – 7:30
4. "It Must Be Obvious" – 4:21
5. "Paninaro" (12-inch remix) – 8:40

== Personnel ==
Credits are adapted from the liner notes of "So Hard" and from Pet Shop Boys Catalogue.

Pet Shop Boys

- Chris Lowe
- Neil Tennant

Additional personnel

- Harold Faltermeyer – production
- Julian Mendelsohn – mixing
- Brian Reeves – engineering
- Dominic Clarke – additional programming

Artwork

- Mark Farrow/3a and PSB – design
- Eric Watson – photography

== Charts ==
=== Weekly charts ===
Weekly chart performance for "So Hard"
Chart (1990–1991)	Peak position
Australia (ARIA)	27
Austria (Ö3 Austria Top 40)	14
Belgium (Ultratop 50 Flanders)	8
Canada (The Record)	18
Canada Top Singles (RPM)	77
Canada Dance/Urban (RPM)	9
Europe (Eurochart Hot 100 Singles)	3
Finland (Suomen virallinen lista)	1
Germany (GfK)	3
Ireland (IRMA)	3
Italy (Musica e dischi)	2
Luxembourg (Radio Luxembourg)	2
Netherlands (Dutch Top 40)	15
Netherlands (Single Top 100)	11
New Zealand (Recorded Music NZ)	24
Norway (VG-lista)	9
Portugal (UNEVA)	8
Quebec (ADISQ)	17
Spain (AFYVE)	2
Sweden (Sverigetopplistan)	3
Switzerland (Schweizer Hitparade)	2
UK Singles (Official Charts)	4
US Billboard Hot 100	62
US Alternative Airplay (Billboard)	17
US Dance Club Songs (Billboard)	4
US Dance Singles Sales (Billboard)	2
US Cash Box Top 100	66

=== Year-end charts ===
Year-end chart performance for "So Hard"
Chart (1990)	Position
Belgium (Ultratop 50 Flanders)	83
Europe (Eurochart Hot 100 Singles)	74
Germany (Media Control)	75
Netherlands (Single Top 100)	99
Sweden (Topplistan)	24

== Release history ==
Release dates and formats for "So Hard"
Region	Date	Format(s)	Label(s)	Ref(s).
United Kingdom	24 September 1990	7-inch vinyl; 12-inch vinyl; CD; cassette	Parlophone	
United Kingdom	8 October 1990	12-inch remix vinyl	Parlophone	
Japan	17 October 1990	Mini-CD	EMI	
Australia	22 October 1990	7-inch vinyl; cassette	Parlophone	
Australia	5 November 1990	12-inch vinyl	Parlophone	

== Cover versions ==
A cover version by Scottish musician Momus was included on the 2001 compilation Very Introspective, Actually: A Tribute to the Pet Shop Boys.
