= Introspective =

1988 Pet Shop Boys album

- One of several CD editions

Studio album by Pet Shop Boys
- Released: 10 October 1988
- Recorded: 1987–1988
- Studios: Advision (London); Sarm West (London)
- Genres: Synth-pop; dance-pop; disco; house
- Length: 48:03
- Label: Parlophone
- Producers: Trevor Horn; David Jacob; Stephen Lipson; Lewis A. Martineé; Julian Mendelsohn; Pet Shop Boys

Pet Shop Boys chronology
Actually (1987)	Introspective (1988)	Behaviour (1990)

Singles from Introspective
- 1. "Domino Dancing" Released: 12 September 1988; 2. "Left to My Own Devices" Released: 14 November 1988; 3. "It's Alright" Released: 26 June 1989

Alternative cover
- Vinyl cover

Professional ratings
Review scores
Source	Rating
AllMusic	4/5 stars
Los Angeles Times	3.5/4 stars
NME	"squillion"/10
Q	4/5 stars
Record Mirror	4/5
Rolling Stone	2/5 stars
The Rolling Stone Album Guide	4/5 stars
Spin Alternative Record Guide	10/10
Uncut	8/10
The Village Voice	A−

Introspective is the third studio album by English synth-pop duo Pet Shop Boys, released on 10 October 1988 by Parlophone. It received generally positive reviews from critics.

== Background ==
The album was unusual in that it reversed the typical process by which pop/dance acts released singles. Instead of releasing an album of regular-length (3–5-minute) songs, then releasing lengthy remixes of those songs on subsequent singles, Introspective was released as an LP consisting of songs that all lasted six minutes or more. Tracks released as singles like "Always on My Mind" and "Domino Dancing" had been issued as shorter, more radio-friendly mixes prior to the album. None was released as a radio single in the same form as it appeared on the album. It was also the case for the two other singles "Left to My Own Devices" and "It's Alright".

Of the six tracks on the album, only two were written specifically for the album—"Left to My Own Devices" and "Domino Dancing". "Always on My Mind" and "It's Alright" are cover versions, "I Want a Dog" is a song that previously appeared as B-side of the single "Rent", and "I'm Not Scared" is their own version of a song they had written for Patsy Kensit's pop group Eighth Wonder. "Always on My Mind" was re-recorded for this album and mixed with "In My House", a new acid-house track on the album which expanded the lyric.

Introspective was re-released in 2001 (as were the duo's first six albums) as Introspective/Further Listening 1988–1989. The re-released version was digitally remastered and came with a second disc of B-sides and previously unreleased material from around the time of the album's original release. Yet another re-release followed on 9 February 2009, under the title Introspective: Remastered. This version contains only the six tracks on the original. With the 2009 re-release, the 2001 two-disc re-release was discontinued. On 2 March 2018, the two-disc version of the album was re-released, this time featuring newly remastered versions of the tracks. It was also released as a digital download and on vinyl.

Neil Tennant, in a speech he gave to the Oxford Union, said he regretted releasing Introspective so soon after Actually as he felt the 12-inch nature of the songs may have put some fans off the band and this probably impacted on the sales of Behaviour, the subsequent album critically regarded as the Pet Shop Boys' finest album but commercially one of their least successful. Nevertheless, Introspective remains, according to Tennant, the best-selling Pet Shop Boys album internationally. It peaked at number two on the UK Albums Chart, behind U2's Rattle and Hum.

== Track listing ==
All tracks are written by Chris Lowe and Neil Tennant, except where noted.

No.	Title	Writer(s)	Producer(s)	Length
1.	"Left to My Own Devices"		Trevor Horn; Stephen Lipson	8:16
2.	"I Want a Dog"		Pet Shop Boys; Frankie Knuckles^{[b]}	6:15
3.	"Domino Dancing"		Lewis A. Martineé; Pet Shop Boys^{[c]}	7:40
4.	"I'm Not Scared"		Pet Shop Boys; David Jacob	7:23
5.	"Always on My Mind / In My House"	Wayne Carson Thompson; Mark James; Johnny Christopher	Julian Mendelsohn; Pet Shop Boys	9:05
6.	"It's Alright"	Sterling Void; Marshall Jefferson^{[a]}; Paris Brightledge^{[a]}	Horn; Lipson	9:24
Total length:				48:03

Further Listening 1988–1989 (bonus disc)
No.	Title	Writer(s)	Length
1.	"I Get Excited (You Get Excited Too)" (Twelve-inch mix)		5:35
2.	"Don Juan" (demo version) (previously unreleased on CD)		4:22
3.	"Domino Dancing" (demo version) (previously unreleased on CD)		4:47
4.	"Domino Dancing" (alternative version)		4:52
5.	"The Sound of the Atom Splitting" (extended version)	Tennant; Lowe; Lipson; Horn	5:13
6.	"What Keeps Mankind Alive?"	Bertolt Brecht; Kurt Weill	3:26
7.	"Don Juan" (disco mix)		7:35
8.	"Losing My Mind" (disco mix)	Stephen Sondheim	6:09
9.	"Nothing Has Been Proved" (demo for Dusty) (previously unreleased)		4:51
10.	"So Sorry, I Said" (demo for Liza) (previously unreleased)		3:26
11.	"Left to My Own Devices" (seven-inch mix)		4:47
12.	"It's Alright" (ten-inch version) (previously unreleased on CD)	Void; Jefferson; Brightledge	4:47
13.	"One of the Crowd"		3:56
14.	"It's Alright" (seven-inch version)	Void; Jefferson; Brightledge	4:20
15.	"Your Funny Uncle"		2:18

=== Notes ===
- ^{^[a]} Only Sterling Void is credited as a songwriter on original pressings of Introspective and the "It's Alright" single. Starting in 2001, Pet Shop Boys releases featuring "It's Alright" also credit Marshall Jefferson and Paris Brightledge for songwriting.
- ^{^[b]} signifies an additional producer
- ^{^[c]} signifies an associate producer

== Personnel ==
Credits adapted from the liner notes of Introspective.

=== Pet Shop Boys ===
- Neil Tennant
- Chris Lowe

=== Additional musicians ===
- Richard Niles – orchestra arrangement and conducting (track 1)
- Sally Bradshaw – additional vocals (track 1)
- Josh Milan – piano solo (track 2)
- Fro Sossa – additional keyboards (track 3)
- Mike Bakst – additional keyboards, brass score (track 3)
- Nestor Gomez – guitar (track 3)
- Tony Concepción – brass, trumpet solo (track 3)
- Kenneth William Faulk, Dana Tebor, Ed Calle – brass (track 3)
- Lewis A. Martineé – brass arrangements (track 3)
- The Voice in Fashion – backing vocals (track 3)
- Blue Weaver – Fairlight programming (track 4)
- Andy Richards, Gary Maughan – Fairlight programming (track 5)
- Judy Bennett, Sharon Blackwell, H. Robert Carr, Mario Friendo, Derek Green, Michael Hoyte, Herbie Joseph, Paul Lee, Gee Morris, Dee Ricketts, Iris Sutherland, Yvonne White – additional vocals (track 6)

=== Technical ===
- Trevor Horn – production (tracks 1, 6)
- Stephen Lipson – production, engineering (tracks 1, 6)
- Pet Shop Boys – production (tracks 2, 4, 5); associate production (track 3)
- David Jacob – engineering (tracks 2, 4); production (track 4)
- Mike Nielsen – engineering (track 2)
- Frankie Knuckles – mix, additional production (track 2)
- John Poppo – mix engineering (track 2)
- Lewis A. Martineé – production, engineering, mixing (track 3)
- Mike Couzzi – engineering (track 3)
- César Sogbe – engineering assistance (track 3)
- Julian Mendelsohn – production, engineering (track 5)
- Tim Young – 2001 & 2018 remastering

=== Artwork ===
- Mark Farrow – cover design
- Pet Shop Boys – cover design
- Eric Watson – photography

== Charts ==
=== Weekly charts ===
Weekly chart performance for Introspective
Chart (1988)	Peak position
Australian Albums (ARIA)	44
Austrian Albums (Ö3 Austria)	8
Canada Top Albums/CDs (RPM)	11
European Albums (Music & Media)	3
Finnish Albums (Suomen virallinen lista)	1
German Albums (Offizielle Top 100)	3
Icelandic Albums (Tónlist)	5
Italian Albums (Musica e dischi)	9
Japanese Albums (Oricon)	7
New Zealand Albums (RMNZ)	15
Norwegian Albums (VG-lista)	14
Spanish Albums (AFYVE)	3
Swedish Albums (Sverigetopplistan)	5
Swiss Albums (Schweizer Hitparade)	2
UK Albums (Official Charts)	2
US Billboard 200	34

2018 weekly chart performance for Introspective
Chart (2018)	Peak position
Hungarian Albums (MAHASZ)	38

=== Year-end charts ===
1988 year-end chart performance for Introspective
Chart (1988)	Position
Canada Top Albums/CDs (RPM)	80
European Albums (Music & Media)	65
UK Albums (Gallup)	24

1989 year-end chart performance for Introspective
Chart (1989)	Position
Canada Top Albums/CDs (RPM)	73
German Albums (Offizielle Top 100)	61

== Certifications and sales ==
Certifications and sales for Introspective
Region	Certification	Certified units/sales
Brazil	—	140,000
Canada (Music Canada)	Platinum	100,000^{^}
Finland	—	32,840
Germany (BVMI)	Gold	250,000^{^}
Spain (Promusicae)	Platinum	100,000^{^}
Sweden (GLF)	Gold	50,000^{^}
Switzerland (IFPI Switzerland)	Gold	25,000^{^}
United Kingdom (BPI)	2× Platinum	600,000^{^}
United States (RIAA)	Gold	500,000^{^}
Summaries
Europe	—	1,200,000
^{^} Shipments figures based on certification alone.
