= Being Boring =

1990 single by Pet Shop Boys

Single by Pet Shop Boys

from the album Behaviour
- B-side: "We All Feel Better in the Dark"
- Written: 1989–1990
- Released: 12 November 1990
- Recorded: 1990
- Studio: Red Deer (Munich); Sarm West (London)
- Genre: Synth-pop
- Length: 6:48 (album version); 4:50 (7-inch edit); 10:40 (extended version)
- Label: Parlophone
- Songwriters: Chris Lowe; Neil Tennant
- Producers: Pet Shop Boys; Harold Faltermeyer

Pet Shop Boys singles chronology
"So Hard" (1990)	"Being Boring" (1990)	"Where the Streets Have No Name (I Can't Take My Eyes Off You)" / "How Can You Expect to Be Taken Seriously?" (1991)

Music video
- "Being Boring" on YouTube

"Being Boring" is a song by English synth-pop duo Pet Shop Boys, released in November 1990 by Parlophone as the second single from their fourth studio album, Behaviour (1990). The song was written by Chris Lowe and Neil Tennant, and produced by them with German producer Harold Faltermeyer. It reached number 20 on the UK Singles Chart, marking the duo's first single to miss the top 10 since "Opportunities (Let's Make Lots of Money)" in 1986. Its music video was directed by fashion photographer Bruce Weber.

== Background and composition ==
"Being Boring" is concerned with the idea of growing up and how people's perceptions and values change as they grow older. The title originated from a Japanese review that accused the duo of being boring, in reference to their "famously deadpan presentation". The phrase reminded Neil Tennant of a 1922 quotation by Zelda Fitzgerald, "she refused to be bored chiefly because she wasn't boring", which had been paraphrased on a party invitation from his friend Christopher Dowell in the 1970s. As teenagers in Newcastle, they had agreed that they would not settle for boring lives.

In a 1993 interview, Tennant described "Being Boring" as "one of the best songs that we've written", and said that "For me it is a personal song because it's about a friend of mine who died of AIDS, and so it's about our lives when we were teenagers and how we moved to London, and I suppose me becoming successful and him becoming ill".

"Being Boring" was written between 1989 and 1990. The track was originally demoed in a studio in West Glasgow, where the music for "My October Symphony", "The End of the World" and the unreleased "Love and War" were also written. Chris Lowe decided that the music should emulate Stock Aitken Waterman by going up a semitone into the chorus, to give it an uplifting feeling. The verse ends on G and goes up to A-flat instead of C for the chorus.

The lyrics for the first verse, about the 1920s quote on the party invitation, and the second verse, about leaving Newcastle for London in the 1970s, had materialised by that point. Tennant wrote the final verse in 1990, in a rented room in Munich, wishing that his friend was still there. Tennant has called "Being Boring" an autobiographical elegy for his friend, Dowell, who died in 1989; the songs "It Couldn't Happen Here" (1987) and "Your Funny Uncle" (1989) deal with his illness and his funeral.

== Recording ==
The demo was presented to producer Harold Faltermeyer at Red Deer Studios, Munich, whose expertise in analog synthesizers came to the forefront in the song's production. The basis of the song was laid with Roland TR-808 and Roland TR-909 drum machines, plus a Roland TB-303 bass synthesizer. Synthesizers used included a Roland Jupiter-8 (which makes up the layered textures in the introduction and the melody line throughout), an Oberheim OB-8 (which was blended with the Jupiter-8 for the main melody) and a Synclavier (for the harp glissandos).

Further work was done at Sarm West Studios in London with Julian Mendelsohn; the "wakka-wakka" guitar line by J.J. Belle (influenced by Isaac Hayes's Theme from Shaft (1971)) was recorded there, among a few other parts.

== Release ==
"Being Boring" debuted on the UK Singles Chart at number 36 and peaked at number 20 the following week, ending a streak of 10 consecutive top 10 hits. At the time, it was the least successful Pet Shop Boys single in the period since "West End Girls" had become their first hit.

In the United States, "Being Boring" was not released as a standalone single but as a double A-side with "How Can You Expect to Be Taken Seriously?". It reached number ten on Billboard magazine's Dance Singles Sales chart.

In 2024, Pet Shop Boys released a new recording of "Being Boring" on Furthermore, the bonus EP with the two-disc version of their fifteenth album, Nonetheless. In the middle of the song, Tennant says the words that are written at the beginning of the music video (see Music video).

=== Artwork ===
The single cover (pictured) was designed by Mark Farrow with photographs by the Douglas Brothers. The layout is essentially the same as the album cover of Behaviour. The quote attributed to Zelda Fitzgerald was included on the back cover.

== Critical reception ==
Stephen Thomas Erlewine from AllMusic called the song "wistful". A reviewer from Music & Media commented, "Up-tempo, smooth and pushy pop from the Boys. The nervous groove is made out of a persistent rhythm guitar and a floating synth. A natural hit, produced by Pet Shop Boys and Harold Faltermeyer." Selina Webb from Music Week wrote, "Hardly boring, but certainly one of their most gently-handled tracks. The Scandal-style productions puts the emphasis on the charming lyrics which deliver the Tennant muse in oblique phrases, not unlike those found in a New Order song. As usual its appeal is enhanced with each airing and, equally, it will enjoy a sustained chart performance."

Roger Morton from NME described "Being Boring" as "a scrapbook flick through his journey from expectant Northern youth in the '70s to a doubting '90s adulthood, burdened by unease and a sense of loss (of close friends)." In their single review, a reviewer from the magazine wrote, "The only heart-thumping moment on "Being Boring" is when some synthetic harp sound appears from nowhere to add a bit of colour to the otherwise grey monotony of the song." Miranda Sawyer from Smash Hits said, "Title of the Fortnight without a doubt, but although "Being Boring" is fairly fabulous in an understated way, with Neil being all wistful over nice violins and a discreet tickety beat, it just doesn't have that swooshy drama or singalong chorus that great Pet Shop Boys singles are made of. An "album track" I believe it's called."

In 2023, The Guardian named "Being Boring" as the best Pet Shop Boys song.

== Cultural impact ==
Music journalist and LGBTQ cultural critic Barry Walters ranked "Being Boring" among his generation's saddest songs and called it "one of the era's greatest gay achievements".

He sums up the calamitous loss that came with AIDS in two terse lines: "All the people I was kissing/Some are here and some are missing". Not only is he hinting he's gay, the singer strongly suggests that his friends and former partners are already dead. This small statement broke a vast silence.

Alex Petridis of The Guardian called it "Not just one of the greatest songs about the Aids epidemic, but one of the greatest songs written about mortality and memory". George Michael selected "Being Boring" as one of his Desert Island Discs on the BBC Radio 4 programme, commending Tennant for writing beautiful lyrics that remembered and honoured friends lost to AIDS.

== Music video ==
The accompanying music video for "Being Boring", the first by fashion photographer Bruce Weber, was filmed in black and white, showing a house party on Long Island. It begins with a nude swimmer and a written message: "I came from Newcastle in the North of England. We used to have lots of parties where everyone got dressed up. And on one party invitation was the quote 'she was never bored because she was never boring'. The song is about growing up—the ideals that you have when you're young and how they turn out".

Due to some brief shots of full male nudity, the video was banned from MTV and relegated to airing on the Playboy Channel. The video was played in US dance clubs in support of a non-commercial 12-inch remix single of "Being Boring" and was credited by EMI for maintaining interest in the album and promoting sales.

== Live performances ==
"Being Boring" was not initially played on the 1991 Performance Tour, leading many fans, including Axl Rose of Guns N' Roses, to complain about its omission. As a result, it was added as an encore late in the tour, with the band commenting that it "invariably got the best reception of the night". Pet Shop Boys played a set that included "Being Boring" and "Go West" at the Stonewall Equality Show, supporting LGBTQ rights, at the Royal Albert Hall on 26 October 1997. "Being Boring" has been performed as an encore on other tours, including the 1994 Discovery Tour, released on CD and DVD as Discovery: Live in Rio 1994; the Pandemonium Tour in 2009–2010, featured on the live album and concert film Pandemonium; and on the Dreamworld: The Greatest Hits Live tour that began in 2022.

== B-side ==
The B-side, "We All Feel Better in the Dark" was written around a piece of music Chris Lowe had composed and features him as the lead vocalist. He said that "The idea came from a tape I bought from a health food shop round the corner from the studio: The Secrets of Sexual Attraction. The words are terrible. Awful. Embarrassing." Lowe performed the song during their Performance tour in 1991. The remix 12-inch includes two mixes of the track by Brothers in Rhythm.

== Track listings ==
- 7-inch, cassette, and mini-CD single
1. "Being Boring" – 4:50
2. "We All Feel Better in the Dark" – 4:00
- 12-inch single

A. "Being Boring" (extended mix) – 10:40
B. "We All Feel Better in the Dark" (extended mix) – 6:45

- 12-inch remix single

A1. "Being Boring" (Marshall Jefferson remix) – 9:01
B1. "We All Feel Better in the Dark" (After Hours Climax) – 5:29
B2. "We All Feel Better in the Dark" (Ambient) – 5:20

- CD single
1. "Being Boring" – 4:50
2. "We All Feel Better in the Dark" – 4:00
3. "Being Boring" (extended mix) – 10:40

== Personnel ==
Credits adapted from the liner notes for Behaviour: Further Listening 1990–1991 and "Being Boring".

Pet Shop Boys

- Neil Tennant
- Chris Lowe

Additional musicians

- J.J. Belle – guitar
- Dominic Clarke – plastic tube

Technical personnel

- Harold Faltermeyer – production
- Pet Shop Boys – production
- Julian Mendelsohn – mixing
- Brian Reeves – engineering
- Bob Kraushaar – engineering, vocals recording

Artwork

- Mark Farrow and Pet Shop Boys – design
- Douglas Brothers – photography

== Charts ==
=== Weekly charts ===
Weekly chart performance for "Being Boring"
Chart (1990–1991)	Peak position
Australia (ARIA)	82
Austria (Ö3 Austria Top 40)	30
Belgium (Ultratop 50 Flanders)	27
Canada Top Singles (RPM)	90
Europe (Eurochart Hot 100 Singles)	27
Finland (Suomen virallinen lista)	5
Germany (GfK)	13
Ireland (IRMA)	17
Italy (Musica e dischi)	5
Luxembourg (Radio Luxembourg)	14
Netherlands (Single Top 100)	66
Quebec (ADISQ)	22
Spain (AFYVE)	13
Sweden (Sverigetopplistan)	16
Switzerland (Schweizer Hitparade)	16
UK Singles (Official Charts)	20
UK Airplay (Music Week)	4
US Dance Singles Sales (Billboard) with "Seriously"	10

=== Year-end charts ===
Year-end chart performance for "Being Boring"
Chart (1991)	Position
Germany (Media Control)	91
Italy (Musica e dischi)	71

== Release history ==
Release dates and formats for "Being Boring"
Region	Date	Format(s)	Label(s)	Ref(s).
United Kingdom	12 November 1990	7-inch vinyl; 12-inch vinyl	Parlophone	
United Kingdom	19 November 1990	CD; cassette	Parlophone	
Australia	17 December 1990	12-inch vinyl	Parlophone	
Japan	11 January 1991	Mini-CD	EMI	
Australia	21 January 1991	7-inch vinyl; cassette	Parlophone	
