= Scott Davidson (musician) =

Scott Davidson (born March 1963) is an entrepreneur and former session musician who played keyboards with Bros and Pet Shop Boys, before founding the Trade-It free advert paper and becoming a director and then chairman of Bristol City FC from 1996–2001. In 1991, he accompanied Pet Shop Boys on their Performance Tour, playing keyboards and operating the sequencers. In 2003, Davidson was a co-founder of The Big Fundraiser, now known as The Invitation Book, a discount voucher annual which aims to raise money for charities, based on an American publication, Entertainment. He also has interests in software development, property, manufacturing and publishing in Ireland. He was a co-founder of vouchercloud.com, the digital voucher and discount platform which is responsible for the iPhone and Android app vouchercloud.
