= Fundamental Tour =

2006–07 concert tour by Pet Shop Boys

- Tour by Pet Shop Boys
- Promotional poster for tour
- Associated album: Fundamental
- Start date: 15 June 2006
- End date: 25 November 2007
- Legs: 6
- No. of shows: 64 in Europe; 24 in North America; 7 in South America; 6 in Australasia; 3 in Asia; 104 in total

Pet Shop Boys concert chronology
- Release Tour (2002); Fundamental Tour (2006–07); Pandemonium Tour (2009–10)

The Fundamental Tour (also known as Fundamental Live) was a concert tour by English synth-pop duo Pet Shop Boys. The tour supported the group's ninth studio album, Fundamental (2006). Beginning in June 2006, the trek played over 100 dates in Europe, the Americas, Australia and Asia. The tour lasted over 17 months.

== Background and itinerary ==
=== 2006 ===
The Fundamental Tour kicked off in June 2006 in Skien, Norway, for the first of three dates in Scandinavia, followed by a headline appearance before a crowd of 19,000 at the Santander Summer Festival in Spain. The first stop in the UK was at the Tower of London for two shows at an open-air music festival in the old moat. The tour visited a number of other festivals in Europe, including headline spots at Exit in Serbia, the Melt Festival in Germany, Creamfields Andalucia in Spain, and Bestival on the Isle of Wight, plus a performance in Thetford Forest in England as part of the Forest Live concert series.

In October and November 2006, the tour travelled to North America, with dates in Canada, the United States, and Mexico. The production was longer than the summer shows and was presented in two parts with an interval. The tour coincided with the US release of PopArt: The Hits, which had been available in the UK and elsewhere since 2003. The concert at the Auditorio Nacional in Mexico City was filmed and released on DVD in 2007 as Cubism.

On New Year's Eve, Pet Shop Boys were scheduled to perform at a Hogmanay celebration in Edinburgh, but the festivities were cancelled due to a severe storm.

=== 2007 ===
The first stop of the Fundamental Tour of 2007 was on 5 January at the Cee'd Winter Festival in Madrid, which also featured local electropop band Fangoria. In March, a new leg of the tour began in South America. The set design was streamlined for easier transport, replacing the original cube structure with a screen.

Travelling to New Zealand for the first time, the tour group's plane was nearly hit by meteorites, although they were unaware of it at the time. In Australia, they played in four locations for the V Festival and the Best of V Festival, plus an additional full-length performance in Sydney.

After a stop in Norway at the end of April for Bergenfest, the production toured Europe from May through August, covering the Baltics and playing multiple dates in Germany as well as the UK. Festival stops included the Garden Party in Ireland, the Eden Sessions in Cornwall, and Newmarket Nights at the Newmarket Racecourse. The tour also travelled to Asia for Singfest in Singapore and two dates in Japan for the Summer Sonic Festival. The only scheduled US date in 2007, at the Hollywood Bowl in Los Angeles, was cancelled, citing "logistical issues".

In October, Dainton Connell, long-time friend and colleague of Chris Lowe and Neil Tennant, died in a car crash in Moscow. A concert in Romania was rescheduled so the duo could attend his funeral, and a date in Moscow was also postponed but ended up cancelled due to elections in Russia. Other scheduled concerts went on as planned. They played back-to-back festivals in Spain at Fiestas del Pilar in Zaragoza and the Asics Music Festival in Barcelona, followed up by an appearance at the Greenspace Festival in Valencia. The Some Days Never End series at the Irish Museum of Modern Art focused on the connection between art and music. The last show of the Fundamental Tour was the rescheduled Romanian date on 25 November 2007.

== Production ==
=== Set and lighting ===
The Fundamental Tour was designed by Es Devlin, who had also designed the Pet Shop Boys' musical, Closer to Heaven (2001). The original set featured a large cube that could be divided into separate panels and rearranged into different configurations. Neon borders framed the cube sections. Interior compartments covered in semitransparent material were used by the performers; for example, on "Rent" (1987), Tennant sang in silhouette on the lower level with a dancer above.

A streamlined version of the set was created in 2007 due to the logistics of touring to South America, Australia, and New Zealand. The cube was replaced with a two-dimensional screen. Drapes and a framework of LED tubes were used to change the size and shape.

Lighting and projections enhanced the set. Lighting designer Carl Burnett created a theatrical, 1980s superclub look using overhead and floor lights as well as backlighting the screen. There was no spotlight on Lowe at his request. Imagery included net curtains for "Suburbia" (1986) and the funeral procession of Diana, Princess of Wales during "Dreaming of the Queen" (1993).

Giant cutouts of the duo's heads were brought onstage for "Always on My Mind" (1987), with dancers in different headdresses emerging from behind them in a routine that also featured a dancing top hat.

=== Costumes ===
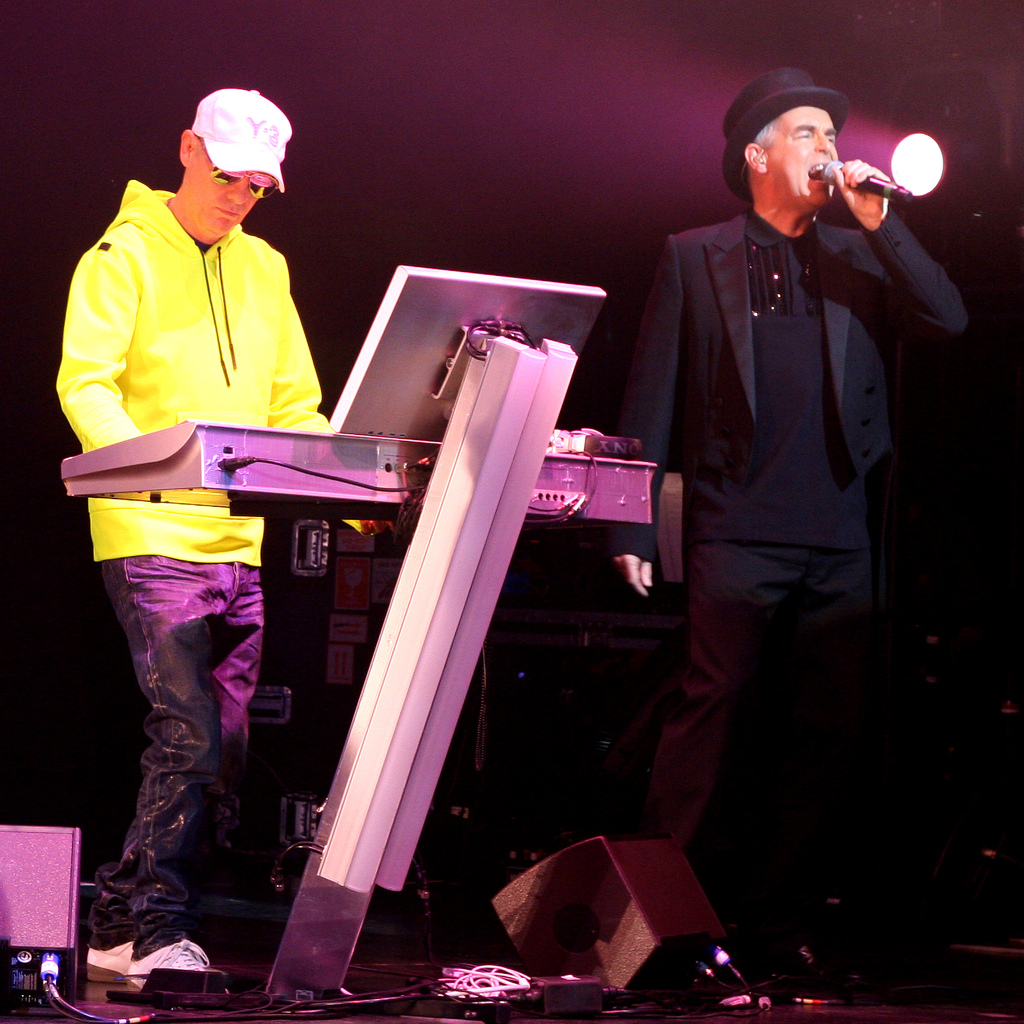
Chris Lowe (left) and Neil Tennant wearing jackets by Hedi Slimane on the Fundamental Tour

Pet Shop Boys' look for the Fundamental Tour was a "stylized version of normal". The duo's main wardrobe was by Hedi Slimane for Dior Homme. Lowe had a fluorescent yellow hoodie, and Tennant wore a black tailcoat, which he accessorised with a top hat.

During the opening number, "God Willing" (2006), two performers emerged from the cube, one in a yellow hoodie and the other in a tailcoat and top hat; they were followed by two more, also in identical clothes, before Lowe and Tennant made their entrance.

Throughout the show, the supporting players wore a variety of costumes to suit the music, including dark hoodies for "Suburbia", suits for "Shopping" (1987), and gold lamé cowboy outfits for "Where the Streets Have No Name (I Can't Take My Eyes Off You)" (1991). Performing "Domino Dancing" (1988), the dancers wore vintage basketball jerseys of 1980s Denver Nuggets player Alex English. For "The Sodom and Gomorrah Show" (2006), the cast wore military gear while Tennant wore a dress uniform with medals. Jeffrey Bryant was the tour's costume designer and wardrobe coordinator.

=== Music and performance ===
The performance featured two dancers—Ivan "Swan" Blackstock and Nathan Holliday—and a pair of backing singers—Nick Clow and Andy Love—along with frequent Pet Shop Boys guest vocalist Sylvia Mason-James. Hakeem Onibudo was the choreographer.

Tennant introduced the show as an evening of "electronic entertainment". The expanded performance that premiered in North America in the autumn of 2006 was around two hours long with a 20-minute intermission, which was announced with a recording by Ian McKellen.

Lowe's keyboard setup included a Korg Triton with a pair of Access Virus rackmount modules. Tennant used a Shure SM58 microphone with Ultimate E5 brand in-ear monitors. He played acoustic guitar on "Home and Dry" (2002). A bass player and drummer joined the duo onstage for "The Sodom and Gomorrah Show". The backing vocalists, featuring Sylvia Mason-James, performed "So Hard" (1990) to lead off the encore.

The set list featured song pairings by theme or style, such as "Minimal" (2006) and "Shopping", with their titles spelled out in the chorus as well as on the screens, and the Latin sound of "Se a vida é (That's the Way Life Is)" (1996) blending with "Domino Dancing". On the second year of the tour, some changes were made. A cover version of the self-referential "We're the Pet Shop Boys" (2003) replaced "Psychological" (2006) as the first song after the intro, and Lowe performed his solo number, "Paninaro" (1986). "Being Boring" (1990) appeared as an addition to the usual encore of "It's a Sin" (1987) and "Go West" (1993).

== Critical reception ==
Reviewing the May 2007 show at the Hammersmith Apollo in London, Richard Clayton of the Financial Times commented: "... Pet Shop Boys are a great British double-act. Their costumes may change but the dynamic remains the same: vocalist Neil Tennant's urbane sophisticate supported by the stage surliness of Chris Lowe, glowering behind his synthesizer. They realised long ago that this image is a kind of trademark, and it's the point of departure for all their visually vibrant performances".

Of the same show, Lisa Verrico of The Times wrote: "For their first British tour in five years, Neil Tennant and Chris Lowe returned to the camp costumes, daft dance moves and sheer silliness of their heyday and pulled off perhaps the slickest show of their two decade-plus career. Live, Pet Shop Boys' problem has always been their lack of activity on stage… This time… they had dancing doppelgangers to do the hard graft, a surreal sight in itself, and opted for a mix of musical theatre and disco".

Fixed seating presented an issue in some venues. At the Boston Opera House, Billy Callaghan of Edge Media Network observed: "Unlike the dancing which would have taken place at a club such as Avalon, at the Opera House the crowd seemed uncertain about what to do for most of the night. By the time the band ended their entertaining hour and 40-minute show with It’s a Sin, and the rousing anthem, Go West, any doubt had subsided and the crowd was on its feet dancing and singing along. At last!" Christopher Porter of The Washington Post noted a similar situation at the "posh venue" Constitution Hall, adding: "But far too few in the crowd seemed to know the songs from "Fundamental," and the tracks "Psychological" and "Minimal" kept the audience sitting on their hands. Whenever the classics came out, however, the crowd found its dancing shoes".

== Set list ==
2006

The following set list was performed on 13 October 2006. It is not representative of all concerts performed in 2006.

1. "Psycho" (Video Introduction)
2. "God Willing"
3. "Psychological"
4. "Left to My Own Devices"
5. "I'm with Stupid"
6. "Suburbia"
7. "Can You Forgive Her?"
8. "Minimal"
9. "Shopping"
10. "Rent"
11. "Dreaming of the Queen"
12. "Heart"
13. "Opportunities (Let's Make Lots of Money)"
14. "Integral"
15. "Numb"
16. "Se a vida é (That's the Way Life Is)"
17. "Domino Dancing"
18. "Flamboyant"
19. "Home and Dry"
20. "Always on My Mind"
21. "Where the Streets Have No Name (I Can't Take My Eyes Off You)"
22. "West End Girls"
23. "The Sodom and Gomorrah Show"

Encore

24. "So Hard"
25. "It's a Sin"
26. "Go West"
2007

The following set list was performed on 20 May 2007. It is not representative of all concerts performed in 2007.

1. "God Willing"
2. "We're the Pet Shop Boys"
3. "Left to My Own Devices"
4. "I'm with Stupid"
5. "Suburbia"
6. "Can You Forgive Her?"
7. "Minimal"
8. "Shopping"
9. "Rent"
10. "Dreaming of the Queen"
11. "Heart"
12. "Opportunities (Let's Make Lots of Money)"
13. "Integral"
14. "Paninaro"
15. "Numb"
16. "Se a vida é (That's the Way Life Is)"
17. "Domino Dancing"
18. "Flamboyant"
19. "Home and Dry"
20. "Always on My Mind"
21. "Where the Streets Have No Name (I Can't Take My Eyes Off You)"
22. "West End Girls"
23. "The Sodom and Gomorrah Show"

Encore

24. "So Hard"
25. "It's a Sin"
26. "Go West"
27. "Being Boring"

== Tour dates ==
List of 2006 concerts
Date (2006)	City	Country	Venue	Festival or series
15 June	Skien	Norway	Skienshallen	Sommerfestival
16 June	Stockholm	Sweden	Cirkus	
17 June	Copenhagen	Denmark	Parken Stadium	Zulu Rocks
24 June	Santander	Spain	Playa de Rostrío	Santander Summer Festival
28 June	London	England	Tower of London	Tower of London Music Festival
29 June	London	England	Tower of London	Tower of London Music Festival
2 July	Liverpool	England	Big Top Arena at Clarence Dock	Liverpool Summer Pops
8 July	Sopron	Hungary	Lővér Kemping	VOLT Fesztivál
9 July	Novi Sad	Serbia	Petrovaradin Fortress	Exit
14 July	Gräfenhainichen	Germany	Ferropolis	Melt! Festival
17 July	Bonn	Germany	Bonner Museumsplatz	
21 July	Brandon	England	Thetford Forest	Forest Live
23 July	Valencia	Spain	L'Àgora	Eclèctic Festival
1 August	Vigo	Spain	Auditorio do Parque de Castrelos	
11 August	Prague	Czech Republic	Výstaviště Praha-Holešovice	Love Planet Festival
12 August	Costa de Almería	Spain	Playa de Villaricos	Creamfields Andalucia
14 August	Leuven	Belgium	Oude Markt	Marktrock
2 September	Ludwigslust	Germany	Schloßgarten Ludwigslust	
3 September	Stradbally	Ireland	Stradbally Hall	Electric Picnic
5 September	Barcelona	Spain	Espacio Movistar	
7 September	Skopje	Macedonia	Macedonia Square	
9 September	Newport	England	Robin Hill Country Park	Bestival
10 September	Warsaw	Poland	Tor wyścigów konnych Służewiec	Summer of Music Festival
10 October	Montreal	Canada	Salle Wilfrid-Pelletier	
11 October	Toronto	Canada	Hummingbird Centre	
13 October	Boston	United States	Boston Opera House	
14 October	New York City	United States	Radio City Music Hall	
15 October	Washington, D.C.	United States	DAR Constitution Hall	
17 October	Miami Beach	United States	Jackie Gleason Theater	
18 October	Orlando	United States	Hard Rock Cafe	
19 October	Atlanta	United States	The Tabernacle	
21 October	Austin	United States	The Backyard	
22 October	Grand Prairie	United States	Nokia Live	
24 October	St. Louis	United States	The Pageant	
26 October	Detroit	United States	State Theatre	
27 October	Chicago	United States	Chicago Theatre	
28 October	Minneapolis	United States	Orpheum Theatre	
30 October	Denver	United States	Paramount Theatre	
1 November	Phoenix	United States	Arizona Veterans Memorial Coliseum	Arizona State Fair
3 November	West Valley City	United States	Ford Theatre	
5 November	Seattle	United States	Paramount Theatre	
7 November	San Francisco	United States	Bill Graham Civic Auditorium	
8 November	Los Angeles	United States	Wiltern LG Theatre	
9 November	Los Angeles	United States	Wiltern LG Theatre	
12 November	Guadalajara	Mexico	Teatro Diana	
14 November	Mexico City	Mexico	Auditorio Nacional	
16 November	Monterrey	Mexico	Arena Monterrey	

List of 2007 concerts
Date (2007)	City	Country	Venue	Festival or series
5 January	Madrid	Spain	Palacio de Deportes	Cee'd Winter Festival
14 March	Rio de Janeiro	Brazil	Citibank Hall	
16 March	São Paulo	Brazil	Credicard Hall	
17 March	São Paulo	Brazil	Credicard Hall	
18 March	Belo Horizonte	Brazil	Chevrolet Hall	
21 March	Porto Alegre	Brazil	Gigantinho	
23 March	Buenos Aires	Argentina	Luna Park	
25 March	Santiago	Chile	Estación Mapocho	
29 March	Auckland	New Zealand	St. James Theatre	
31 March	Sydney	Australia	Centennial Park	V Festival
1 April	Gold Coast	Australia	Avica Resort	V Festival
3 April	Melbourne	Australia	Sidney Myer Music Bowl	Best of V Festival
4 April	Adelaide	Australia	Adelaide Entertainment Centre	Best of V Festival
6 April	Sydney	Australia	Hordern Pavilion	
27 April	Bergen	Norway	Grieg Hall	Bergenfest
29 April	Oslo	Norway	Sentrum Scene	
2 May	Tallinn	Estonia	Saku Suurhall Arena	
3 May	Riga	Latvia	Arena Riga	
4 May	Vilnius	Lithuania	Siemens Arena	
7 May	Berlin	Germany	Tempodrom	
8 May	Frankfurt	Germany	Alte Oper	
9 May	Chemnitz	Germany	Stadthalle Chemnitz	
11 May	Düsseldorf	Germany	Philipshalle	
13 May	Wolfsburg	Germany	Volkswagen Arena	
14 May	Munich	Germany	Zenith die Kulturhalle	
15 May	Zürich	Switzerland	Volkshaus	
17 May	Hamburg	Germany	Stadtpark Freilichtbühne	
20 May	Stuttgart	Germany	Hegel-Saal	
21 May	Paris	France	Le Grand Rex	
22 May	Amsterdam	Netherlands	RAI Theatre	
24 May	Gateshead	England	The Sage Gateshead	
25 May	Wolverhampton	England	Wolverhampton Civic Hall	
27 May	London	England	Hammersmith Apollo	
28 May	Manchester	England	Manchester Carling Apollo	
30 May	Brighton	England	Brighton Centre	
1 June	Copenhagen	Denmark	Tivoli Gardens	Fredagsrock
2 June	Skive	Denmark	Strandtangen	Skive Beach Party
5 June	Nottingham	England	Nottingham Royal Concert Hall	
6 June	London	England	Hammersmith Apollo	
7 June	Swindon	England	Oasis Leisure Centre	
9 June	Clonmellon	Ireland	Ballinlough Castle	Garden Party
16 June	Hultsfred	Sweden	Hultsfreds Hembygdspark	Hultsfred Festival
30 June	Hoyos del Espino	Spain	La Finca Mesegosillo	Músicos en la Naturaleza
18 July	Castellazzo di Bollate	Italy	Villa Arconati	Festival di Villa Arconati
19 July	Montreux	Switzerland	Auditorium Stravinski	Montreux Jazz Festival
22 July	Cornwall	England	Eden Outdoor Stage	Eden Sessions
27 July	Newmarket	England	Newmarket Racecourse	Newmarket Nights
2 August	Málaga	Spain	Auditorio Municipal de Málaga	Freedom 2007
4 August	Lokeren	Belgium	Grote Kaai	Lokerse Feesten
8 August	Central Area	Singapore	Fort Canning	Singfest
11 August	Osaka	Japan	Maishima Sports Island	Summer Sonic Festival
12 August	Chiba	Japan	Makuhari Event Hall	Summer Sonic Festival
11 October	Zaragoza	Spain	Paseo de la Independencia	Fiestas del Pilar
12 October	Barcelona	Spain	Palau Sant Jordi	Asics Music Festival
25 October	Valencia	Spain	Sala Greenspace	Festival Heineken Greenspace
27 October	Dublin	Ireland	Irish Museum of Modern Art	Some Days Never End
25 November	Bucharest	Romania	Sala Palatului	

=== Cancellations and rescheduled shows ===
Date	City	Country	Venue	Reason
31 December 2006	Edinburgh	Scotland	West Princes Street Gardens	Hogmanay celebration cancelled due to bad weather.
4 April 2007	Adelaide	Australia	Memorial Drive Park	Moved to Adelaide Entertainment Centre.
16 August 2007	Bali	Indonesia	Bali International Convention Center	Cancelled
27 September 2007	Los Angeles	United States	Hollywood Bowl	Cancelled due to logistical issues.
19 October 2007	Bucharest	Romania	Sala Palatului	Rescheduled to 25 November 2007 due to Dainton Connell's funeral.
7 November 2007	Moscow	Russia	Khodynka Ice Palace	Rescheduled to 2 December 2007 due to Dainton Connell's death.
2 December 2007	Moscow	Russia	Khodynka Ice Palace	Cancelled due to Russian elections.

=== Box office score data ===
Venue	City	Tickets sold / available	Gross revenue
Salle Wilfrid-Pelletier	Montreal	1,971 / 2,500 (79%)	$103,850
Hummingbird Centre	Toronto	2,722 / 2,722 (100%)	$152,756
Boston Opera House	Boston	1,555 / 2,641 (59%)	$93,150
Radio City Music Hall	New York City	5,961 / 5,961 (100%)	$420,924
DAR Constitution Hall	Washington, D.C.	2,153 / 3,500 (61%)	$190,425
Jackie Gleason Theater	Miami Beach	2,286 / 2,286 (100%)	$133,566
The Tabernacle	Atlanta	2,143 / 2,549 (84%)	$101,244
Nokia Live at Grand Prairie	Grand Prairie	1,759 / 1,940 (91%)	$115,594
State Theatre	Detroit	1,096 / 2,700 (40%)	$47,911
Chicago Theatre	Chicago	3,242 / 3,543 (91%)	$219,044
Orpheum Theatre	Minneapolis	1,558 / 2,579 (60%)	$87,167
Paramount Theatre	Denver	903 / 1,861 (48%)	$44,881
Ford Theatre	West Valley City	2,526 / 4,930 (51%)	$88,184
Paramount Theatre	Seattle	2,399 / 2,688 (89%)	$132,670
Bill Graham Civic Auditorium	San Francisco	3,621 / 4,605 (79%)	$229,535
Wiltern LG Theatre	Los Angeles	4,468 / 4,468 (100%)	$293,473
Citibank Hall	Rio de Janeiro	3,004 / 8,432 (36%)	$154,291
Credicard Hall	São Paulo	10,856 / 13,492 (80%)	$508,787
Wolverhampton Civic Hall	Wolverhampton	2,769 / 2,769 (100%)	$145,751
Hammersmith Apollo	London	9,134 / 9,784 (93%)	$535,761
Manchester Carling Apollo	Manchester	3,415 / 3,415 (100%)	$179,562
Brighton Centre	Brighton	3,482 / 4,000 (87%)	$183,058
Nottingham Royal Concert Hall	Nottingham	1,809 / 1,809 (100%)	$95,212
Oasis Leisure Centre	Swindon	1,755 / 2,200 (80%)	$92,710
TOTAL		76,587 / 97,374 (79%)	$4,349,506

== Personnel ==
Adapted from the credits of Cubism (Rhino, 2007).

Pet Shop Boys

- Neil Tennant
- Chris Lowe

Dancers

- Nathan Holliday
- Ivan "Swan" Blackstock

Singers

- Sylvia Mason-James
- Nick Clow
- Andy Love

Creative and tour personnel

- Pete Gleadall – musical director
- Es Devlin – creative direction, set design
- Hakeem Onibudo – choreography
- Jeffrey Bryant – costume design, wardrobe
- Hedi Slimane (Dior Homme) – Pet Shop Boys' wardrobe
- Andy Crookston – tour manager
- Joe Sanchez – production manager
- Carl Burnett – lighting design
- Tom Fleming – lighting technician
- Dave Waldon – lighting technician
- Dan Curley – lighting board operator
- Julien Hogg – screens operator
- Colin Boland – theatre sound
- Seamus Fenton – stage monitors
- Ben Adams – MIDI tech
- Jim Webb – head set carpenter
- Tom Keane – set carpenter

== Concert film ==
The show was filmed at the Auditorio Nacional in Mexico on 14 November 2006, and was released on DVD format as Cubism in 2007.
