= Pet shop =

A pet shop or pet store is an essential services retailer which sells animals and pet care resources to the public.

Pet Shop may also refer to:

- Pet Shop (film), a 1994 American film
- Pet Shop (JoJo's Bizarre Adventure), a fictional character
- The Pet Shop, an American television program
- "Pet Shop" sketch, a Monty Python's Flying Circus sketch
- Pet Shop, the original name of the Canadian television series Pet Corner
- Pet Shop, the sixth set in the Lego Modular Buildings series

== See also ==
- Littlest Pet Shop, a toy franchise owned by Hasbro
  - Littlest Pet Shop (1995 TV series), an American animated television series
  - Littlest Pet Shop (video game), a 2008 video game
  - Littlest Pet Shop (2012 TV series), an American-Canadian animated television series
- Pet Shop Boys, an English synth-pop duo
  - Pet Shop Boys: A Life in Pop, a 2006 British documentary film
- Pet Shop of Horrors, a Japanese manga series
