= Zschornewitz =

- Ortsteil of Gräfenhainichen
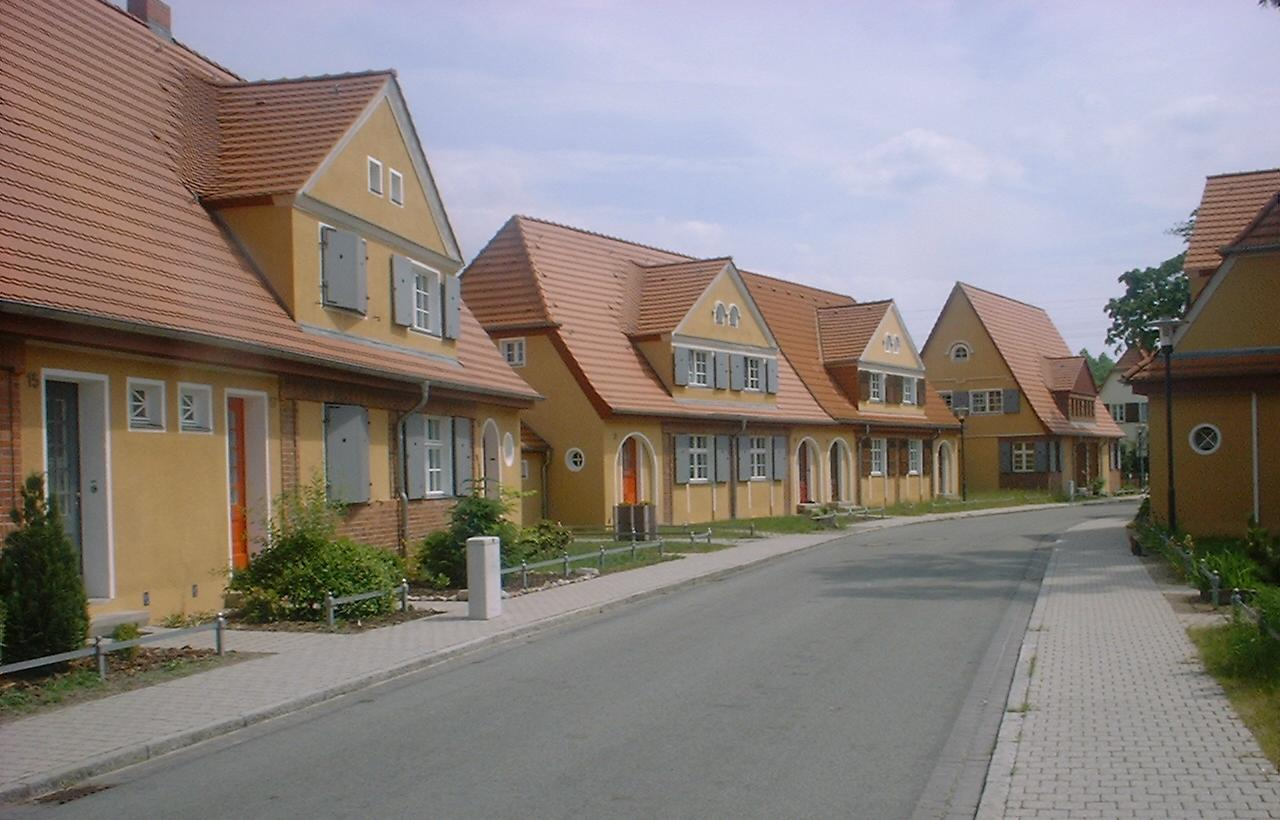
- Interactive map of Zschornewitz
- Location within Germany Location within Saxony-Anhalt
- Coordinates: 51°43′N 12°24′E
- Country: Germany
- State: Saxony-Anhalt
- District: Wittenberg
- Town: Gräfenhainichen

Area
  - Total: 13.04 km^{2} (5.03 sq mi)
- Elevation: 83 m (272 ft)

Population (2011)
  - Total: 2,710
  - Density: 208/km^{2} (538/sq mi)
- Time zone: UTC+01:00 (CET)
  - Summer (DST): UTC+02:00 (CEST)
- Postal codes: 06791
- Dialling codes: 034953
- Vehicle registration: WB
- Website: www.graefenhainichen.de

Zschornewitz (German pronunciation: [ˈtʃɔʁnəvɪts]) is a village and a former municipality on the southwestern edge of the Wittenberg district in Saxony-Anhalt, Germany. Since 1 January 2011, it is part of the town Gräfenhainichen. It was part of the administrative community (Verwaltungsgemeinschaft) of Tor zur Dübener Heide. It lies about 4 km west of the former district seat of Gräfenhainichen, right on the border with Saxony.

== Geography ==
The former municipalities of Jüdenberg, Möhlau, Burgkemnitz and Gröbern as well as the town of Gräfenhainichen border on the community of Zschornewitz.

=== Subdivisions ===
The municipality was divided into the historical centre of Kolonie, a neighbourhood to the east built for power station, and Pöplitz, about 2 km to the west.

== History ==
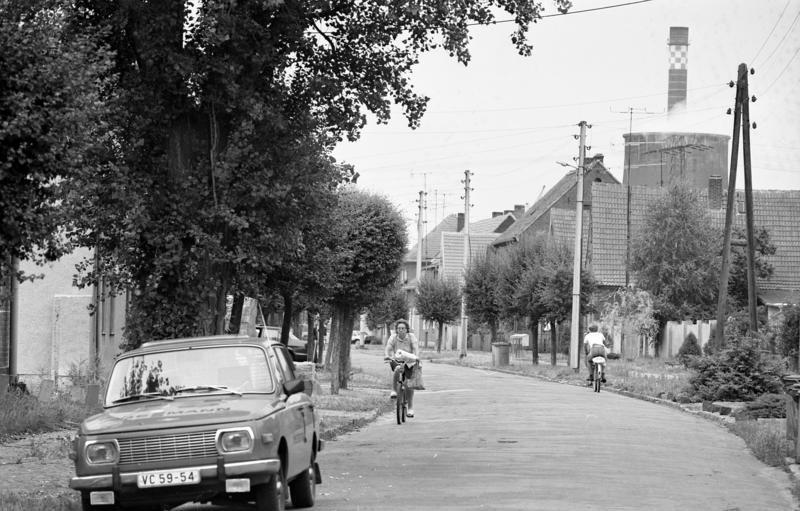
A Zschornewitz street in August 1991; one of the power station's cooling towers can be seen on the right

In the 19th century, there were hardly any more than 200 inhabitants in Zschornewitz.

In 1915, work began on the power station under architect Prof. Klingenberg's plans. At the same time the garden-city-like workers' community Kolonie was established. In 1916, eight turbines capable of 16 MW each were generating a total of 128 MW, making the Zschornewitz power plant the world's biggest brown-coal-fired power station.

In 1920–1921, the school in Kolonie was built.

In 1929, two 85 MW turbines were brought into service (at the time, Europe's biggest). Thirteen huge chimneys became for decades the community's backdrop. In 1945, however, the plant was partially dismantled by the Soviets as part of the war reparations that they exacted from Germany.

On 30 June 1992 came the power plant's final shutdown. The Kolonie and parts of the plant were granted protection as a memorial. In 1995, the preserved part of the old power plant became an industrial memorial. In 1996, the old workers' community Kolonie was included in the list of EXPO projects, undergoing widespread restorations in 1997–99.

On 13 May 2000, Zschornewitz celebrated its 800th anniversary of founding.

== Main sights ==
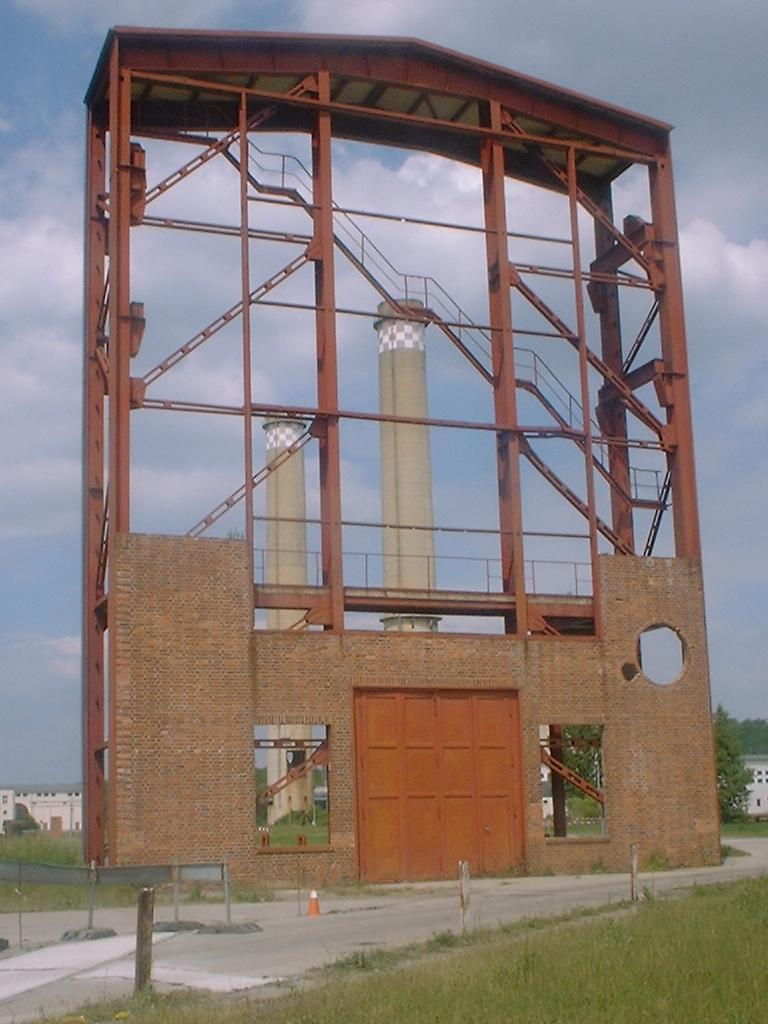
Industrial memorial – Zschornewitz Power Station.

The community's most prominent building is the former Zschornewitz Power Station. Since 1995 this plant has been open to the public as an energy museum.

== Economy and transportation ==
On the old Gröbern strip mine's waste dump south of Zschornewitz, a wind farm was built after the brown coal pit was shut down. It has eight wind turbines. The dump itself rises some 50 m above the surrounding area, making it an ideal place to make good use of wind energy.

Zschornewitz lies on state road (Landesstraße) L136 between Möhlau to Gräfenhainichen and on district road (Kreisstraße) K2037 to Burgkemnitz. Federal highway (Bundesstraße) B 107 in Gräfenhainichen is only about 2 km away.

The Dessau-Ost interchange on the A9 autobahn between Munich and Berlin is about 16 km away.

The nearest Deutsche Bahn railway stations are to be found in Gräfenhainichen and Burgkemnitz on the Wittenberg - Bitterfeld line about 4 km away.

== Population ==
Year	Inhabitants
1990	3,736
2000	3,072
2004	2,957
