= Matthei =

Matthei is a surname. Notable people with the surname include:

- Evelyn Matthei (born 1953), Chilean politician
- Fernando Matthei (1925–2017), Chilean Air Force general
- Niclas Matthei (born 2005 or 2006), better known as Anzeigenhauptmeister for making thousands of citizen-reports of parking violations
