= Jüdenberg =

- Ortsteil of Gräfenhainichen
- Interactive map of Jüdenberg
- Location within Germany Location within Saxony-Anhalt
- Coordinates: 51°45′N 12°25′E
- Country: Germany
- State: Saxony-Anhalt
- District: Wittenberg
- Town: Gräfenhainichen

Area
  - Total: 24.47 km^{2} (9.45 sq mi)
- Elevation: 79 m (259 ft)

Population (2011)
  - Total: 550
  - Density: 22/km^{2} (58/sq mi)
- Time zone: UTC+01:00 (CET)
  - Summer (DST): UTC+02:00 (CEST)
- Postal codes: 06773
- Dialling codes: 034953
- Vehicle registration: WB
- Website: Gemeinde Jüdenberg

Jüdenberg (German pronunciation: [ˈjyːdn̩ˌbɛʁk]) is a Ortsteil in Wittenberg district in Saxony-Anhalt, Germany. Since January 2007, it belongs to the municipality of Gräfenhainichen. Jüdenberg lies about 4 km northwest of Gräfenhainichen on the edge of the Biosphere Reserve Middle Elbe.

== Politics ==
The municipal council was made up of eight councillors.

- CDU 1 seat
- Marksmen's Club (citizens' coalition) 5 seats
- Fire Brigade (citizens' coalition) 3 seats
- Free Voters (citizens' coalition) 2 seats

(as of municipal election held on 5 September 2004)

The honorary mayor Heinz Powroznik was first elected on 15 December 2002.

== Transport ==
=== Road ===
Federal Highway (Bundesstraße) B 107 between Coswig and Bad Düben runs right through the community. The district road K2038 leads to Möhlau. The Dessau-Ost interchange with Autobahn A9 (Munich - Berlin) is about 11 km away.

=== Railway ===
The nearest railway station is about 4 km away in Gräfenhainichen lying on the Deutsche Bahn line between Wittenberg and Bitterfeld. Oranienbaum railway station on the Dessau-Wörlitzer Eisenbahn line is served only in the summer.

Brown coal haulage from the Golpa-Nord strip mine to Vockerode on the stretch of the mining railway running past the community ceased after the power station was shut down. It is still used for special trips to Ferropolis (an industrial museum), so the old signal box has been converted into a halt.
