= Cubism (video) =

- Region 2 DVD cover (Neil Tennant version)

Video by Pet Shop Boys
- Released: 21 May 2007 (UK); 24 July 2007 (US)
- Recorded: 14 November 2006
- Venue: Auditorio Nacional, Mexico City, Mexico
- Genre: Pop, dance
- Length: 114 minutes
- Label: Warner Music Vision (UK); Rhino (US)
- Director: David Barnard

Cubism is a 2007 DVD of a Pet Shop Boys concert from their Fundamental Tour. It was filmed on 14 November 2006 at the Auditorio Nacional in Mexico and was directed by David Barnard.

== Production ==
Pet Shop Boys play songs from their most recent album at the time, Fundamental (2006), as well as hits like "West End Girls" (1985), "It's a Sin" (1987), and "Go West" (1993). The production features two dancers and three backing vocalists, including Sylvia Mason-James, and the set is a cube structure that splits apart and is used as a performance space and projection surface. The title, Cubism, was inspired by the set design.

The concert was filmed from multiple vantage points in High Definition and displays in widescreen. The sound options are PCM Stereo, Dolby 5.1, and DTS.

== Special features ==
The DVD includes an audio commentary of the concert by Neil Tennant, Chris Lowe, and director David Barnard; a nine-minute documentary, Pet Shop Boys in Mexico, featuring interviews with the duo and with fans; and a photo gallery set to an edit of "Integral". A booklet accompanying the DVD has an essay by Pet Shop Boys chronicler Chris Heath. Two covers were made, one with a picture of Lowe and the other with Tennant (pictured).

== Critical reception ==
Keith Caulfield of Billboard commented, "even casual fans will enjoy the DVD, thanks to the hit-filled set list and the ace production of the show". Adam Besenyodi of PopMatters found the second half of the concert weak in comparison to the first half and the encore, and concluded: "The best compliment I can give the film — beyond the deserving technical praise — is that when I finished watching Cubism, I felt like I'd actually been to a Pet Shop Boys concert". Jamie S. Rich of DVD Talk highly recommended the DVD, calling it, "a buoyant document of the Pet Shop Boys' most recent tour. An excellent stage set and well-chosen songs are the backbone of it, but the film is put together well and the DVD technology taken full advantage of."

== Track listing ==
1. "Psycho Intro"
2. "God Willing"
3. "Psychological"
4. "Left to My Own Devices"
5. "I'm with Stupid"
6. "Suburbia"
7. "Can You Forgive Her?"
8. "Minimal"
9. "Shopping"
10. "Rent"
11. "Dreaming of the Queen"
12. "Heart"
13. "Opportunities (Let's Make Lots of Money)"
14. "Integral"
15. "Numb"
16. "Se a vida é (That's the Way Life Is)"
17. "Domino Dancing"
18. "Flamboyant"
19. "Home and Dry"
20. "Always on My Mind"
21. "Where the Streets Have No Name (I Can't Take My Eyes off You)"
22. "West End Girls"
23. "The Sodom and Gomorrah Show"
24. "So Hard"
25. "It's a Sin"
26. "Go West"

Special features

- Photo gallery montage
- Behind the scenes documentary called Pet Shop Boys in Mexico
- Audio commentary with Neil Tennant, Chris Lowe, and David Barnard
