= Integral (song) =

Single by Pet Shop Boys

from the album Disco 4
- Released: 8 October 2007
- Genre: Pop
- Length: 3:55 (on Fundamental); 7:23 (on Disco 4)
- Label: Parlophone
- Songwriters: Neil Tennant; Chris Lowe
- Producer: Trevor Horn

Pet Shop Boys singles chronology
"She's Madonna" (2007)	"Integral" (2007)	"Love Etc." (2009)

Music video
- "Integral" on YouTube

"Integral" is a song by English synth-pop duo Pet Shop Boys from their ninth studio album, Fundamental (2006). The lyrics address the Identity Cards Act 2006 in the UK, which the duo opposed.

A remixed version of the song was released on 8 October 2007 as a download-only single to promote the duo's fourth remix album, Disco 4 (2007). The single peaked at number 197 on the UK Singles Chart.

The artwork for the single is a QR code, which, when scanned, gives a link to the Pet Shop Boys' website. QR codes were also used in the music video, with links to information on identity cards and other topics on civil liberties.

== Background and composition ==
"Integral" was written for Fundamental, an album that explored the domestic effects of the war on terror, including government surveillance and databases. The song criticises the Identity Cards Act 2006. A statement from the band cited the issue as the reason that Neil Tennant ceased his well-publicized support of Tony Blair's Labour party. The lyrics are from the perspective of the Home Secretary making a case for identity cards, putting forth the argument, "If you've done nothing wrong, you've got nothing to fear", which had been used as a justification for the policy.

The words "sterile, immaculate, rational, perfect" are drawn from Yevgeny Zamyatin's dystopian novel We (1924). In the book, the inhabitants of the future One State try to build The Integral, a glass spaceship, in order to solve the cosmic equation and resolve all the problems in their One State.

The single version, titled "PSB Perfect Immaculate mix", was a major reworking of the song, with a new melody. It has the sound of a live version, with crowd noises and a singalong, inspired by performances of the song on the Fundamental Tour.

The download-only single was ranked at number three on 7digital's digital music sales for 2007.

== Music video ==
The music video for "Integral" was created by Tom Roope of The Rumpus Room, with input from long-time Pet Shop Boys designer Mark Farrow and comedian and activist Mark Thomas. Described as a "sinister mix of surveillance type footage and information technology", the black-and-white video incorporated over 100 QR codes that were subliminal when watched in real time. QR codes were widespread in Japan at the time, but were an emerging technology in the UK. Viewers could use the codes to access articles and websites on topics of civil liberties and identity cards, such as NO2ID and the Electronic Privacy Information Center. People were also able to make their own videos to upload to a YouTube group by using a frame-by-frame file of the "Integral" video and adding their own content.

The Rumpus Room won a Gold Lion for the "Integral" video at the 2008 Cannes International Advertising Festival.

== Critical reception ==
In a review of Fundamental for The Observer, Peter Robinson described "Integral" as "both political and angry, and also the album's most furious disco stomper". Popjustice called it "one of the best songs on the album", and, commenting on Trevor Horn's production, added: "'Integral' has amazing 'Two Tribes' orchestra bangs".

Reviewing the "Perfect Immaculate mix" on Disco 4, Anthony Strutt observed: "'Integral' … sounds like it has been recorded live in concert, and recalls Frankie Goes to Hollywood with its large grooves". Tom Hocknell noted that the new remix, "with its stripped down electronics and crowd noise, emerges with an even greater sense of foreboding and menace with the 'if you've done nothing wrong/you've got nothing fear' refrain".

== Live performances ==
A performance of "Integral" from the Fundamental Tour was included on the concert video, Cubism (2007). The song also appears on the live album Concrete (2006), recorded with the BBC Concert Orchestra conducted by Nick Ingman. Michael Hubbard of MusicOMH called this performance of the song, "little short of sensational ... with an impassioned orchestra perfectly aligned with Lowe's technical gizmo wizardry". "Integral" was also played on the Pandemonium Tour (2009–10) and the Electric Tour (2013–15) in arrangements by Stuart Price.

== Track listing ==
- Digital single
1. "Integral" (PSB Perfect Immaculate mix) – 7:16
2. "Integral" (Dave Spoon mix) – 7:10

== Personnel ==
Credits are adapted from the liner notes for Fundamental: Further Listening 2005–2007 and the single for "Integral".

Pet Shop Boys

- Chris Lowe
- Neil Tennant

Additional personnel (original version)

- Trevor Horn – production, electric guitar
- Tim Weidner – recording engineer
- Robert Orton – recording engineer, mix engineer
- Rob Smith – additional recording
- Nick Ingman – orchestral arrangement, conducting
- Debi Doss – backing vocals
- Tessa Niles – backing vocals
- Lucinda Barry – backing vocals
- Andy Caine – backing vocals
- Bruce Woolley – backing vocals
- Jamie Muhoberac – additional keyboards
- Lalo Creme – electric guitar
- Steve Lipson – electric guitar
- Earl Harvin – acoustic drums, electronic drums
- Frank Ricotti – percussion
- Cliff Hewitt – percussion
- Skaila Kanga – harp

Additional personnel (remix version)

- Pet Shop Boys – additional production, remix
- Pete Gleadall – mix engineer, programming, additional vocals
- Tom Stephan – additional vocals
- Miguel Mateo-Garcia – additional vocals
- Sam Taylor-Wood – additional vocals
- Mark Farrow – design

== Charts ==
Chart performance for "Integral"
Chart (2007)	Peak position
Romania (Romanian Top 100)	81
UK Singles (OCC)	197
