= Flamboyant (Pet Shop Boys song) =

2004 single by Pet Shop Boys

Single by Pet Shop Boys

from the album PopArt: The Hits
- B-side: "I Didn't Get Where I Am Today"
- Released: 29 March 2004
- Recorded: 2003
- Genre: Electropop; synth-pop; dance-pop
- Length: 3:50
- Label: Parlophone
- Songwriters: Neil Tennant; Chris Lowe
- Producers: Pet Shop Boys; Tomcraft; Felix J. Gauder; Stuart Crichton

Pet Shop Boys singles chronology
"Miracles" (2003)	"Flamboyant" (2004)	"I'm with Stupid" (2006)

Music video
- "Flamboyant" on YouTube

"Flamboyant" is a song by English synth-pop duo Pet Shop Boys from their greatest hits album, PopArt: The Hits (2003). It was released on 29 March 2004 as the album's second and final single, reaching number nine in Spain, number 12 in the United Kingdom, and number 13 in Denmark.

== Background and composition ==
"Flamboyant" was written for the purpose of being a new single for PopArt. It was included after the duo decided against using "Numb", which they had acquired from songwriter Diane Warren and instead saved for their next studio album, Fundamental (2006).

Lyricist Neil Tennant described "Flamboyant" as, "A celebration of a celebrity's determination to be noticed and in the public eye at all times". He mentioned Elton John, David Beckham, and Oscar Wilde as examples. The line, "Just crossing the street, well, it's almost heroic", refers to Philip Sallon, a club promoter and style innovator, wearing an "unbelievable outfit" in public.

== Release ==
The album version was produced with Tomcraft and Felix J. Gauder at Daylight Studios in Stuttgart in 2003. At the end of the year, the song was remixed for single release with Stuart Crichton, adding extra vocals and keyboards.

An extended mix of the original album version—dubbed the "Tomcraft Extended Mix"—was issued as one of the single's B-sides, along with a remix by Scissor Sisters and one by DJ Hell, who also contributed a remix of "West End Girls" (1985). Another B-side, "I Didn't Get Where I Am Today", features Johnny Marr on guitars, as well as a guitar sample from "Father's Name Is Dad" (1968) by Fire.

=== Artwork ===
The single cover art contains the song title and the duo's name in katakana: "Flamboyant Pet Shop Boys" (フランボヤント ペット・ショップ・ボーイズ, Furanboyanto Petto Shoppu Bōizu). The photos on the different versions were modified stills from the music video. Some featured Tennant and others showed Chris Lowe with long hair (pictured), which he sported for a short time.

== Music video ==
The music video for "Flamboyant" was directed by Nico Beyer. Heavily based on aspects of Japanese popular culture, it tells the story of a Japanese office worker who aspires to appear on the television variety show Kasou Taishou, where guests perform silly stunts. He envisions a billiards-based routine, where he and others portray living balls on an enormous pool table. In the beginning of the video, scenes are of his unsupportive environment; his wife is annoyed at him, his manager scolds him for reading a billiards magazine at work, and his coworkers tease him at lunch. At the end of the video, however, he and his team perform their routine successfully on the show and win top ranking. The story footage is intercut with fake Japanese-style television commercials where the Pet Shop Boys offer various products such as an automatic ironing machine and a car called Boxy (Nissan Micra).

The video was released on DVD on the documentary Pet Shop Boys: A Life in Pop (2006), although the disc does not mention the video's inclusion. DVDs in some territories, like Canada, did not feature the video.

== Critical reception ==
Anthony Smith of Drowned in Sound rated "Flamboyant" a 6 out of 10. Reflecting on the duo "at their zenith", he wrote: "Listening to 'Flamboyant', though, makes it all it seem such a long time ago … this is one single that's in distinct need of some silly hat treatment. A sombre, elegiac affair, its maudlin melody and glum resignation - damn, its sheer restraint - reeks of middle age".

Conversely, Simon Sadler of Emap TV told Music Week, "This is the best thing that they've done in eight or nine years. It's a real return to their old-fashioned, camp-pop form with an extremely funny video. It's one of those big, up-tempo things that they do so well".

== Live performances ==
In November 2003, Pet Shop Boys played "Flamboyant" and three other songs for their first live radio performance on XFM. It was also part of a charity gig at The Barfly in Camden in March 2004. A reviewer for The Guardian observed: "Stripped back to electronics, these songs sound sleeker and tougher. Flamboyant, the new single, and a retooled It's a Sin bite as hard as any electroclash track". A Top of the Pops appearance where the duo staged "Flamboyant" was later included on DVD with the compilation Ultimate (2010).

The song appeared on the Pet Shop Boys' set list for the next few years, including their first concert in Portugal in October 2004, followed by a brief tour of Latin America in November 2004, and on the Fundamental Tour from 2006–2007. A live performance from the latter is included on the DVD Cubism (2007).

== Track listings ==
- 2-track CD
1. "Flamboyant" (single mix)
2. "I Didn't Get Where I Am Today"
- Enhanced CD
1. "Flamboyant" (Tomcraft extended mix)
2. "Flamboyant" (Scissor Sisters silhouettes & shadows mix)
3. "Flamboyant" (DJ Hell remix)
4. "Flamboyant" (demo version)
5. "Flamboyant" (Enhanced video)
- 12-inch vinyl
1. "Flamboyant" (DJ Hell remix)
2. "Flamboyant" (Scissor Sisters silhouettes & shadows mix)
3. "West End Girls" (DJ Hell remix)

== Personnel ==
Credits adapted from the liner notes of PopArt: The Hits and "Flamboyant".

Pet Shop Boys

- Chris Lowe
- Neil Tennant

Technical personnel

- Pet Shop Boys – production
- Tomcraft – production, remix
- Felix J. Gauder – production, remix
- Stuart Crichton – production, mixing (single mix)
- Pete Craigie – mixing (single mix)
- Pete Gleadall – engineering, original programming

Artwork

- Farrow Design/PSB – design, art direction
- Gary Stillwell – still images treated by

== Charts ==
Chart performance for "Flamboyant"
Chart (2004)	Peak position
Belgium (Ultratip Bubbling Under Flanders)	13
Denmark (Tracklisten)	13
France (SNEP)	81
Germany (GfK)	43
Hungary (Single Top 40)	5
Ireland (IRMA)	33
Ireland Dance (IRMA)	3
Romania (Romanian Top 100)	83
Scotland Singles (OCC)	13
Spain (Promusicae)	9
Sweden (Sverigetopplistan)	43
UK Singles (OCC)	12
