= Schköna =

- Ortsteil of Gräfenhainichen
- Interactive map of Schköna
- Location within Germany Location within Saxony-Anhalt
- Coordinates: 51°41′N 12°32′E
- Country: Germany
- State: Saxony-Anhalt
- District: Wittenberg
- Town: Gräfenhainichen

Area
  - Total: 29.15 km^{2} (11.25 sq mi)
- Elevation: 160 m (520 ft)

Population (2009-12-31)
  - Total: 744
  - Density: 25.5/km^{2} (66.1/sq mi)
- Time zone: UTC+01:00 (CET)
  - Summer (DST): UTC+02:00 (CEST)
- Postal codes: 06773
- Dialling codes: 034955
- Vehicle registration: WB
- Website: www.schkoena.de

Schköna (German pronunciation: [ˈʃkøːnaː]) is a village and a former municipality in Wittenberg district in Saxony-Anhalt, Germany. Since January 1, 2011, it is part of the town Gräfenhainichen. It was part of the administrative community (Verwaltungsgemeinschaft) of Tor zur Dübener Heide since January 1, 2005.

== Geography and transport ==
Schköna lies about 9 km southeast of Gräfenhainichen and about 13 km from Bad Düben, in the middle of the Düben Heath, putting the community within the Düben Heath Nature Park. Through the community runs Federal Highway (Bundesstraße) B 107.

== History ==
Schköna had its first documentary mention in the Meißen Bishopric Register of 1346 under the name Skogen. This placename, Skogen, is of Slavic origin, but its meaning is unknown. In the Thirty Years' War, Schköna was utterly destroyed by the Swedes, as were many places in the region. The church was only built anew in 1670.

In 1950, nearby Hohenlubast was amalgamated with Schköna.

== Subdivisions ==
Schköna has one of these: Hohenlubast.

== Sightseeing ==
- Church in Hohenlubast
- Stately home in Schköna
- Wilhemsgrube, a small, former strip mine where brown coal was mined.
