= Disco 4 =

Remix album by Pet Shop Boys
- Released: 8 October 2007
- Recorded: 2003–2007
- Length: 56:28
- Label: Parlophone
- Producers: David Bowie; Brian Eno; Jacob Hellner; Trevor Horn; Madonna; Pet Shop Boys; Stuart Price; Rammstein

Pet Shop Boys chronology
Concrete (2006)	Disco 4 (2007)	Story: 25 Years of Hits (2009)

Singles from Disco 4
- 1. "Integral" Released: 8 October 2007

Disco 4 (also known as Disco Four: Remixed by Pet Shop Boys) is the fourth remix album by English synth-pop duo Pet Shop Boys, released on 8 October 2007 by Parlophone on CD and vinyl. It was not made available as a digital download, due to licensing difficulties for each track.

The album is mainly a compilation of Pet Shop Boys remixes of songs by other artists, a first among any of their releases to date. It also includes a previously unreleased mix of "Integral" and the maxi-mix of "I'm with Stupid", previously released on the Japanese edition of Fundamental.

Since the album consists mostly of songs by other artists, it was ineligible for the UK Albums Chart. Instead, the album reached number 15 on the UK Compilation Chart and number three on the UK Dance Albums Chart.

To promote Disco Four, the PSB Perfect Immaculate mix of "Integral" had a limited service to club and selected radio DJs with a music video released on the duo's official website and YouTube.

== Artwork ==
The album cover art, designed by Mark Farrow, features the numeral 4 made with four white fluorescent tubes, in the style of artist Dan Flavin. The neon art was a continuation of a theme that had begun with Fundamental (2006). On the four inner sleeves of the LP, lights on the fixture were turned off sequentially, so the number of darkened bulbs corresponded to the album side number. A limited-edition CD had a cardboard slipcase showing the lights disassembled.

== Critical reception ==
Professional ratings
Review scores
Source	Rating
AllMusic	3/5 stars
NME	6/10
Record Collector	4/5 stars
Virgin Media	4/5 stars
The Word	Favourable

In a four-star review for Virgin Media, Matt O'Leary remarked on the duo's continuing success and observed: "Disco 4's highlights – David Bowie's excellent Hallo Spaceboy, Yoko Ono's superb Walking On Thin Ice, their own I'm With Stupid – succeed best because of the lack of gimmickry, proving that while the formula is undeniably a bit clichéd, it's their own, and one which works. Simply put, this is good, addictive pop music for fans and new listeners alike".

David Jeffries of AllMusic described some of the remixes: "Here they turn the Killers' "Read My Mind" into a dance anthem and Yoko Ono's "Walking on Thin Ice" into a Euro-trash track that would mix well with any given Fischerspooner song, while Madonna's "Sorry" turns into something that could have fallen off PSB's 1987 album, Actually ... and the cuts are all mixed together to create a nonstop journey". Rating the album three stars, he concluded, "at the very least Disco 4 offers hardcore fans more new experiences than previous volume".

Rebecca Nicholson of NME rated Disco 4 six out of ten, commending the duo's staying power and ability to attract big-name artists but noting, "their ubiquitous synth-drenched sound can't pull this motley crew together, and what's left is a nauseating concoction of the good (Madonna's 'Sorry' gets a thudding rave injection, and Bowie's 'Hello Spaceboy' sounds like a meeting of minds), the bad (have we mentioned Rammstein?) and the pointless (a Maxi Mix of their own 'I'm With Stupid'?)".

== Track listing ==
No.	Title	Writer(s)	Producer(s)	Length
1.	"Read My Mind" (Pet Shop Boys 'Stars Are Blazing' mix) (performed by the Killers)	Brandon Flowers; Mark Stoermer; Dave Keuning	Pet Shop Boys^{[a]}	7:20
2.	"Hallo Spaceboy" (Pet Shop Boys extended mix) (performed by David Bowie with Pet Shop Boys)	Bowie (lyrics and music); Brian Eno (music)	Pet Shop Boys; Bowie^{[b]}; Eno^{[b]}	6:34
3.	"Integral" (Perfect Immaculate mix) (performed by Pet Shop Boys)	Neil Tennant; Chris Lowe	Pet Shop Boys^{[c]}; Trevor Horn^{[b]}	7:23
4.	"Walking on Thin Ice" (Pet Shop Boys electro mix) (performed by Yoko Ono)	Ono	Pet Shop Boys^{[c]}	6:28
5.	"Sorry" (Pet Shop Boys Maxi-Mix) (performed by Madonna)	Madonna; Stuart Price	Pet Shop Boys^{[c]}; Madonna^{[b]}; Price^{[b]}	8:27
6.	"Hooked on Radiation" (Pet Shop Boys Orange Alert mix) (performed by Atomizer)	Atomizer	Pet Shop Boys^{[c]}	5:44
7.	"Mein Teil" (PSB There Are No Guitars on This mix) (performed by Rammstein)	Rammstein	Jacob Hellner; Rammstein; Pet Shop Boys^{[c]}	7:08
8.	"I'm with Stupid" (Pet Shop Boys Maxi-Mix) (performed by Pet Shop Boys)	Tennant; Lowe	Pet Shop Boys^{[c]}; Horn^{[b]}	8:13

=== Notes ===
- ^{^[a]} signifies a remix producer
- ^{^[b]} signifies an original producer
- ^{^[c]} signifies a remixer and additional producer

== Personnel ==
Credits adapted from the liner notes of Disco 4.

=== Pet Shop Boys ===
- Neil Tennant – additional vocals (tracks 1, 5)
- Chris Lowe – additional vocals (track 1)

=== Additional musicians ===
- Pete Gleadall – programming (all tracks); additional vocals (track 3)
- Tom Stephan – additional vocals (track 3)
- Miguel Mateo-Garcia – additional vocals (track 3)
- Sam Taylor-Wood – additional vocals (track 3)

=== Technical ===
- Pet Shop Boys – remix production (track 1); production (track 2); remix, additional production (tracks 3–8)
- Pete Gleadall – remix engineering (track 1); mix engineering (tracks 3, 8); engineering (track 6)
- David Bowie – original production (track 2)
- Brian Eno – original production (track 2)
- Bob Kraushaar – mix engineering (tracks 2, 4); remix engineering (track 7)
- Trevor Horn – original production (tracks 3, 8)
- Goetz Botzenhardt – mix engineering (track 5)

=== Artwork ===
- Mark Farrow – design, art direction
- Pet Shop Boys – design, art direction
- John Ross – photography

== Charts ==
Chart performance for Disco 4
Chart (2007)	Peak position
Spanish Albums (Promusicae)	71
UK Compilation Albums (Official Charts)	15
UK Dance Albums (Official Charts)	3
