= Melt Festival =

German music festival (1997–2024)

Melt! Festival
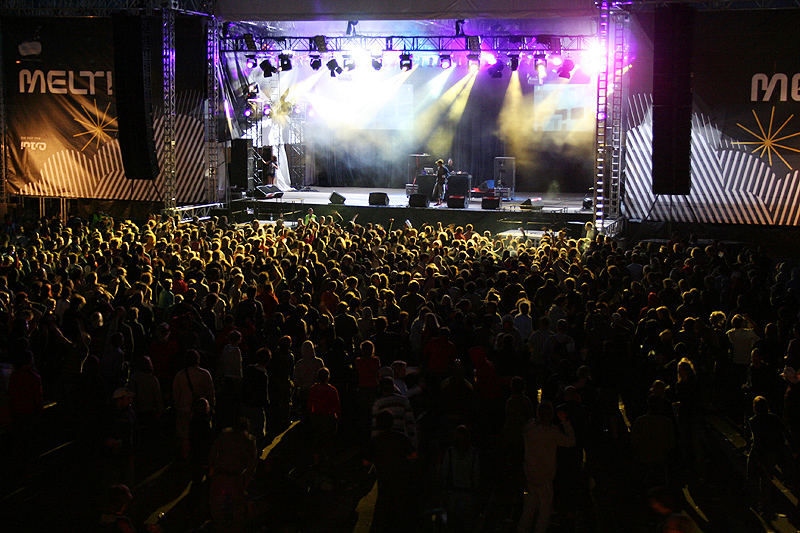
- Genre: Electronic music
- Dates: 3rd weekend of July
- Location(s): Gräfenhainichen, Germany
- Years active: 1997–2024
- Attendance: 20,000
- Capacity: 20,000
- Website: www.meltfestival.de

The Melt Festival (formerly known as the Melt! Festival, and later MELT) was one of the biggest open-air electronic music festivals in Germany. The festival took place at the Ferropolis open-air museum, near Gräfenhainichen. It was held from 1997 to 2024.

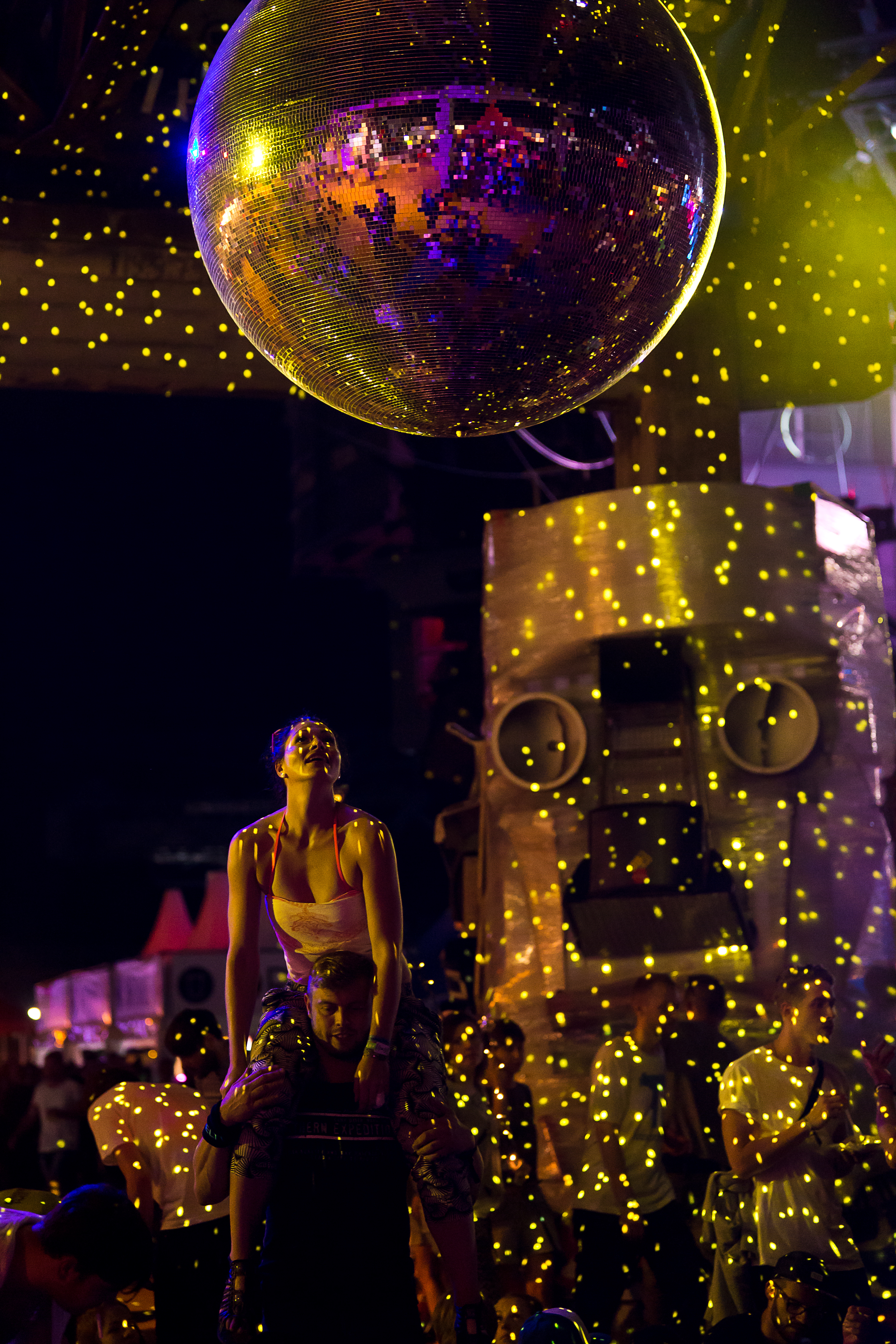
Installation at Melt! 2015

In May 2024, it was that announced that the July 11–13, 2024 festival would be the last.

== Awards and mentions ==
- #2 in Resident Advisor's Top 10 festivals for July 2013.
- #3 in Resident Advisor's Top 10 festivals for July 2014.
- #2 in Resident Advisor's Top 10 festivals for July 2015.
- 2024 Helga festival award in the category "Most beautiful ones and zeros."
- 2024 Helga festival award in the category "Best conscience."

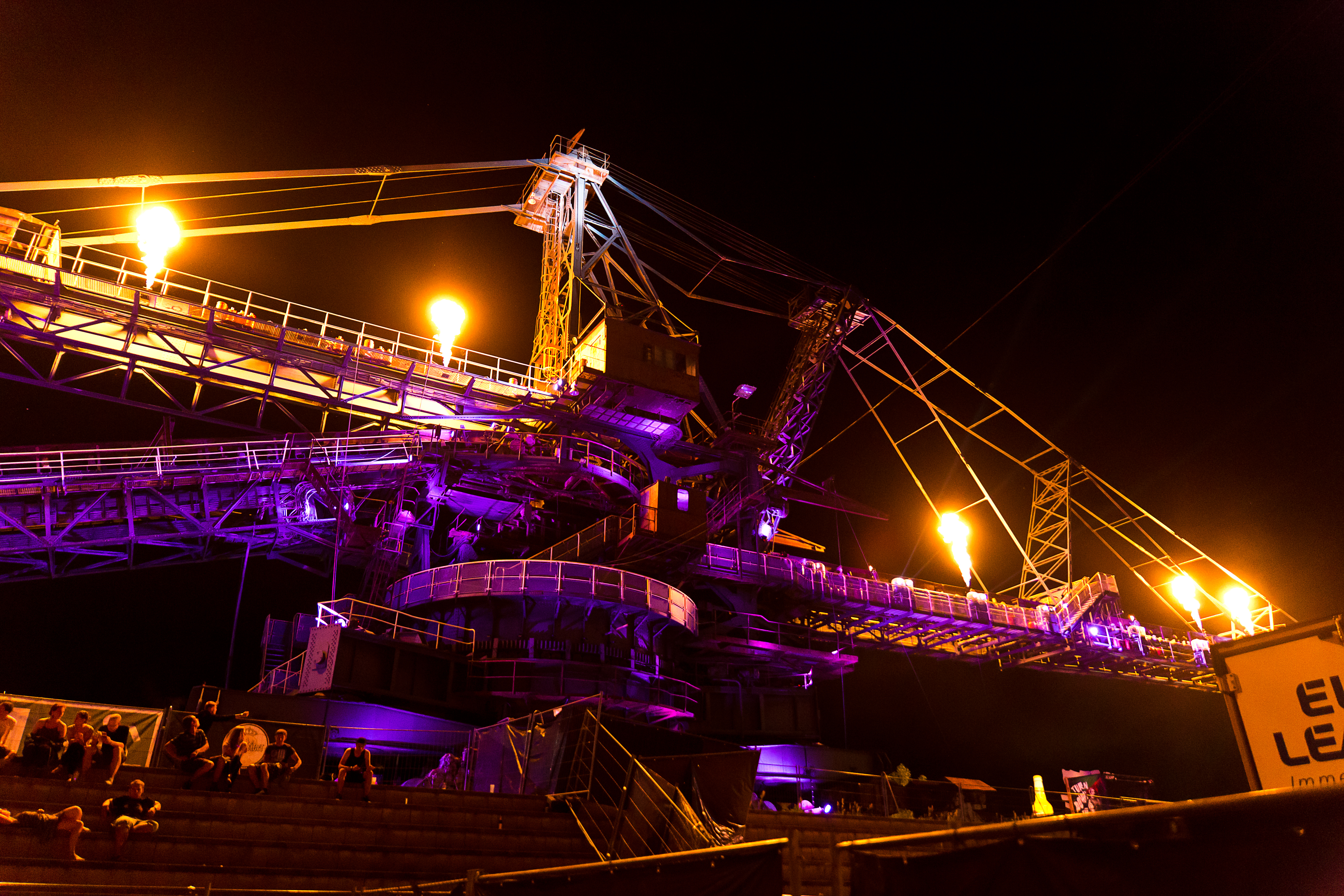
Fire show on a Bucket-wheel excavator at Melt! 2015

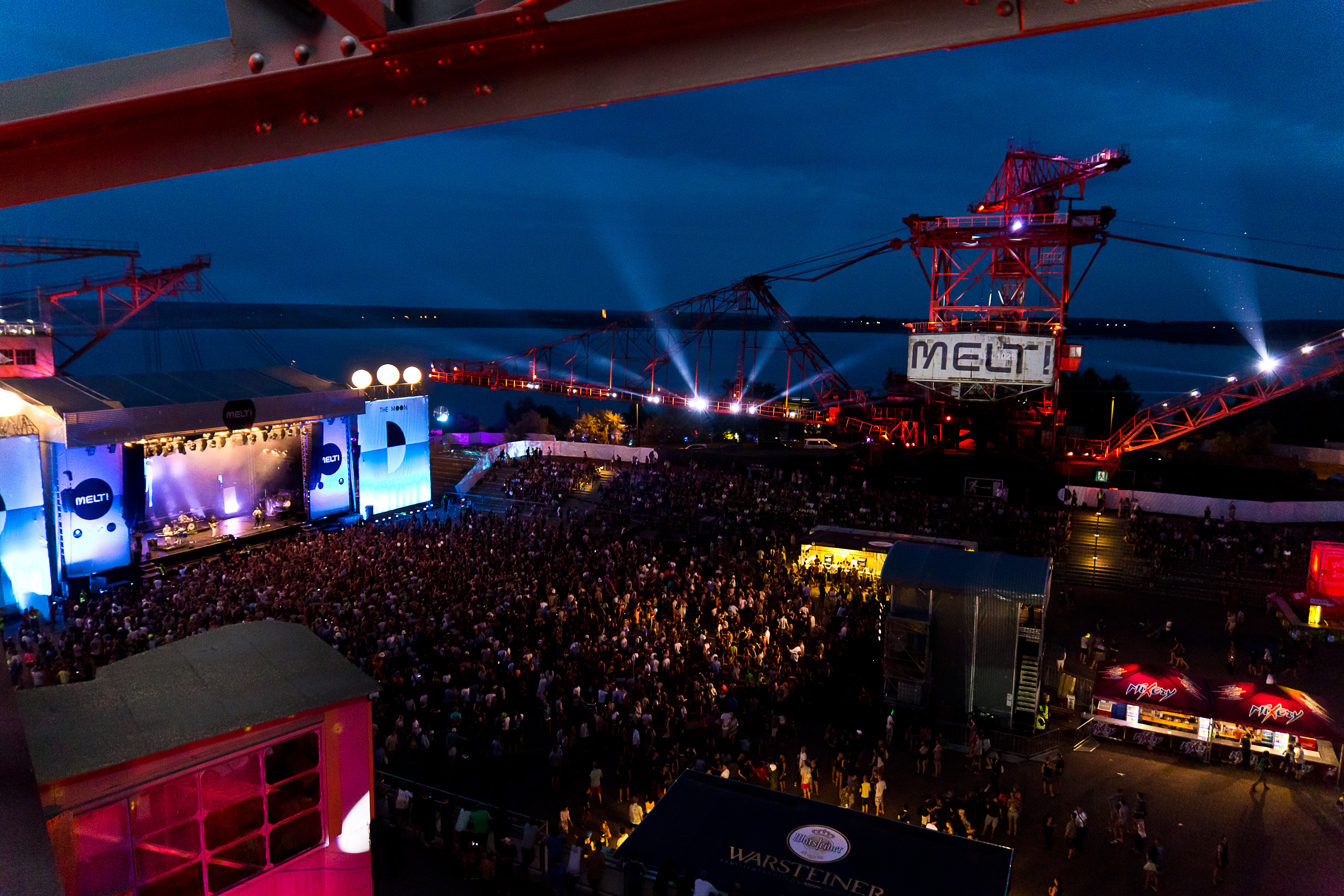
Main Stage and Bucket-wheel excavator at Melt! 2015

== 2012–2014 lineups ==
2014

Portishead, Röyksopp & Robyn, The Notwist, Moderat, Fritz Kalkbrenner, Metronomy, WhoMadeWho ...

2013

The Knife, Trentemøller, Woodkid, Babyshambles ...

2012

M83, Gossip, Whitest Boy Alive, Justice, Two Door Cinema Club, Modeselektor, Bloc Party, Caribou, The Bloody Beetroots ...

== See also ==
- List of electronic music festivals
