= Tornau, Wittenberg =

Tornau
- Ortsteil of Gräfenhainichen
- Interactive map of Tornau
- Location within Germany Location within Saxony-Anhalt
- Coordinates: 51°38′N 12°36′E
- Country: Germany
- State: Saxony-Anhalt
- District: Wittenberg
- Town: Gräfenhainichen

Area
  - Total: 25.81 km^{2} (9.97 sq mi)
- Elevation: 118 m (387 ft)

Population (2009-12-31)
  - Total: 559
  - Density: 21.7/km^{2} (56.1/sq mi)
- Time zone: UTC+01:00 (CET)
  - Summer (DST): UTC+02:00 (CEST)
- Postal codes: 06774
- Dialling codes: 034243
- Vehicle registration: WB
- Website: www.tornau-heidedorf.de

Tornau (German pronunciation: [ˈtɔʁnaʊ]) is a village and a former municipality in Wittenberg district in Saxony-Anhalt, Germany. Since 1 January 2011, it is part of the town Gräfenhainichen. It was part of the administrative community (Verwaltungsgemeinschaft) of Tor zur Dübener Heide.

== Geography ==
=== Location ===
Tornau lies about 5 km north of Bad Düben in the Düben Heath Nature Park.

=== Neighbouring municipalities ===
- Söllichau (Wittenberg district)
- Bad Düben (Delitzsch district, Saxony)
- Schwemsal (Anhalt-Bitterfeld district)
- Schköna (Wittenberg district)

== Economy and transportation ==
Federal Highway (Bundesstraße) B 2 between Leipzig and Wittenberg runs straight through the municipality, while State Highway (Landesstraße) 130, which connects to the B 2 and the B 183/107, crosses the municipal area.
