= Tor zur Dübener Heide =

Administrative community in Saxony-Anhalt, Germany

Coordinates: 51°43′N 12°26′E

Tor zur Dübener Heide (German pronunciation: [ˈtoːɐ̯ tsuːɐ̯ ˈdyːbənɐ ˈhaɪdə], "Gateway to the Düben Heath") was a Verwaltungsgemeinschaft ("administrative community") in the district of Wittenberg, in Saxony-Anhalt, Germany. It was situated southwest of Wittenberg. The seat of the Verwaltungsgemeinschaft was in Gräfenhainichen. It was disbanded in January 2011.

The Verwaltungsgemeinschaft Tor zur Dübener Heide consisted of the following municipalities (population in 2005 in brackets):

- Gräfenhainichen * (7,817)
- Möhlau (2,125)
- Schköna (810)
- Tornau (597)
- Zschornewitz (2,943)
