= Singfest =

Music festival held in Singapore

SINGfest
- Genre: Rock
- Dates: early August (2 days)
- Location: Singapore
- Years active: 2007-Present

SINGfest is one of the major music festivals held in Singapore, which features international acts from diverse genres. The largest live contemporary music event in Southeast Asia, it is usually held in early August for two consecutive days and is currently in its third year running after taking a break in 2009 due to alleged financial troubles. The festival is organized by Midas Promotions and All The Worlds.

== History ==
The first SingFest held in 2007 attracted around 8,500 people. The second SingFest doubled its attendance with 17,000 people.

In 2009, SingFest was postponed despite Midas Promotions promised in 2008 to hold a third festival in 2009. The 2009 festival was postponed partly due to co-organiser, All The Worlds, concentrating on the debut of another music festival, F1 Rocks, which is launched in a similar period.

In 2010, SingFest was expanded to three nights and was held from the 3 to 5 August. Acts include Thirty Seconds to Mars, Kanye West, Katy Perry, The Smashing Pumpkins, Orianthi and Wonder Girls.
