= Pet Corner =

- Also known as: Pet Shop
- Presented by: Rick Campbell
- Country of origin: Canada
- Original language: English
- No. of seasons: 1

Production
- Producers: Peggy Nairn; Joanne Hughes
- Production location: Toronto

Original release
- Network: CBC Television
- Release: 22 October 1953 – 1 July 1954

Pet Corner, originally Pet Shop, is a Canadian children's informational television program that aired on CBC Television from 1953 to 1954.

== Premise ==
This children's program was hosted by Rick Campbell. Campbell interviewed guests about their pets. The original program title was Pet Shop, but was changed to Pet Corner by 3 December 1953. The production involved the Toronto Humane Society.

== Scheduling ==
15-minute episodes were broadcast from 22 October 1953 to 1 July 1954 at 5:15 p.m. each Thursday.
