= Pet Shop Boys: A Life in Pop =

- Directed by: George Scott
- Starring: Pet Shop Boys; Robbie Williams; Brandon Flowers; Peter Robinson; Tim Rice-Oxley; West End Girls; Jake Shears; Bruce Weber
- Country of origin: United Kingdom
- Original language: English

Production
- Producer: Nick de Grunwald
- Running time: 48 minutes (TV version); 140 minutes (DVD version)

Original release
- Release: 24 May 2006

Pet Shop Boys: A Life in Pop is a 2006 documentary about English synth-pop duo Pet Shop Boys. It was originally broadcast on Channel 4 on 24 May 2006, and an expanded version followed on DVD on 23 October 2006. The televised version was 48 minutes long, and the full-length release was 140 minutes.

The documentary was directed by George Scott and produced by Nick de Grunwald. Contributors included Robbie Williams, Brandon Flowers, Peter Robinson, Tim Rice-Oxley, Isabelle Erkendal of West End Girls, Jake Shears, and Bruce Weber.

Pet Shop Boys were interviewed together at the Tate Modern in London as well as individually in their hometowns—Chris Lowe in Blackpool and Neil Tennant in Newcastle upon Tyne. In addition to reminiscing about his early years, Lowe played "It's a Sin" on the Wurlitzer organ in the Blackpool Tower Ballroom. Tennant visited the Literary and Philosophical Society, where he had been a member as a teenager.

The DVD debuted at number seven on the UK Music Video chart on 11 November 2006. Extras included the music videos for "Miracles", "Flamboyant", (Note: "Flamboyant" was not listed on the DVD cover due to an artwork error.) "I'm with Stupid", "Minimal", and "Numb", as well as three notable live performances: their first television appearance in 1984, playing "West End Girls" on the Belgian programme Hit des Clubs; "What Have I Done to Deserve This?" in a duet with Dusty Springfield at the 1988 Brit Awards; and a rendition of "Go West" with a choir of miners at the 1994 Brit Awards.

== Critical reception ==
Pet Shop Boys: A Life in Pop
Review scores
Source	Rating
NOW Magazine	4/5 stars
Soundi	4/5 stars

In a review of the DVD, Cam Lindsay of Exclaim! wrote: "Running through each phase of their career, it's a meticulous storyline — from their break when Tennant was flown to NYC to interview the Police for Smash Hits and international chart domination to their elaborate motifs and constant, unique realignment of pop music ... It's a hefty, exhaustive story (over two hours long) that succeeds on all levels — most importantly in getting the press shy Lowe to actually talk for once".

A reviewer for NOW Magazine commented: "The pacing is good, bouncing between archival footage, recent interviews and segments with other musicians discussing how they were influenced by the Boys, but it never gets bogged down in too much fawning and self-congratulation. What makes it work is that it flows as a story, so you don't have to be a die-hard fan to get something out of it".

In a four-star review for the Finnish magazine Soundi, Jarmo Vähähaka wrote:

Herrojen tarinointi on tietenkin täynnä teräviä huomioita ja kuivaa huumoria. On ilo seurata, miten he selvästikin yhä viihtyvät toistensa seurassa. Kuten monessa muussakin dokumentissa, niin myös tässä vierailevat puhuvat päät ovat suurelta osalta turhia. On ilmeisen vaikea löytää kommentoijaksi jotakuta, jolla olisi oikeasti näkemyksellistä sanottavaa. Onneksi Pet Shop Boysit osaavat tämän itse.

[The gentlemen's storytelling is of course full of sharp observations and dry humour. It's a pleasure to watch how they clearly still enjoy each other's company. As in many other documentaries, the talking heads that appear here are largely useless. It's obviously difficult to find someone as a commentator who has something truly insightful to say. Fortunately, the Pet Shop Boys know how to do this themselves.]

— Jarmo Vähähaka, "Pet Shop Boys: A Life In Pop DVD" (2007)

The original television broadcast was recommended viewing by Chris Riley of The Telegraph, calling it "a cut above most music hagiographies".
