= Anzeigenhauptmeister =

German man who reports road traffic offences

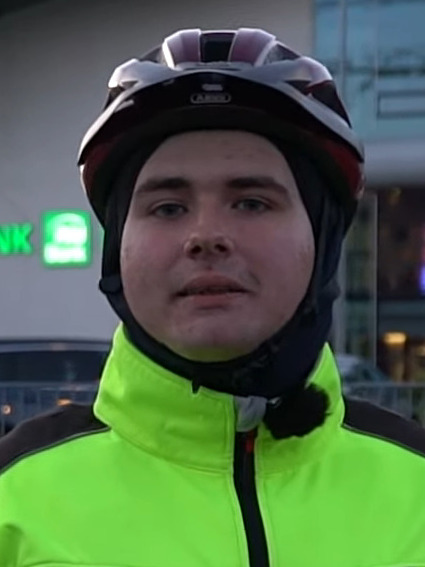
- Anzeigenhauptmeister with his typical clothing in 2024
- Born: 2000s
- Occupation: Activist
- Website: deutscher-anzeigenhauptmeister.eu

Niclas Matthei (born 2005 or 2006), better known as Anzeigenhauptmeister (invented job title similar to "Chief Reporting Officer"), is a German man from Gräfenhainichen in Saxony-Anhalt who became widely known in Germany in 2024 for making thousands of citizen-reports of parking violations usually executed by municipal bylaw enforcement officers.

== Origin ==
Matthei dubbed himself the "Anzeigenhauptmeister" and systematically reports illegally parked cars to the regulatory authorities, Ordnungsbehörde, which handle low-level offences. He uses the website "weg.li" to document violations, and filed over 4,000 reports in 2023. He has also announced a goal to report at least one illegal parker in every city in Germany. He is known for wearing full-body yellow safety clothing while riding a bicycle to find offenders, and he temporarily used the name/symbol "POLIZFI", a play on the German word for police, Polizei.

He came to national attention in Germany in January 2024, and was featured on the Spiegel TV news show in February 2024. Some in the media have criticized the media exposure for coverage of his "hobby" and thus exposing him to public ridicule.

== Reactions ==
Reactions in Germany have been mixed. Some praise his commitment to the enforcement of traffic laws, while others criticize him. When the city of Neumünster called on their residents to report parking violations in the spirit of Matthei, this sparked a debate about citizen participation in government versus surveillance concerns. German rapper Finch released the song "Der Anzeigenhauptmeister" about him, and was in turn reported by Matthei for publishing an unauthorized photo of himself.
