= Möhlau =

- Ortsteil of Gräfenhainichen
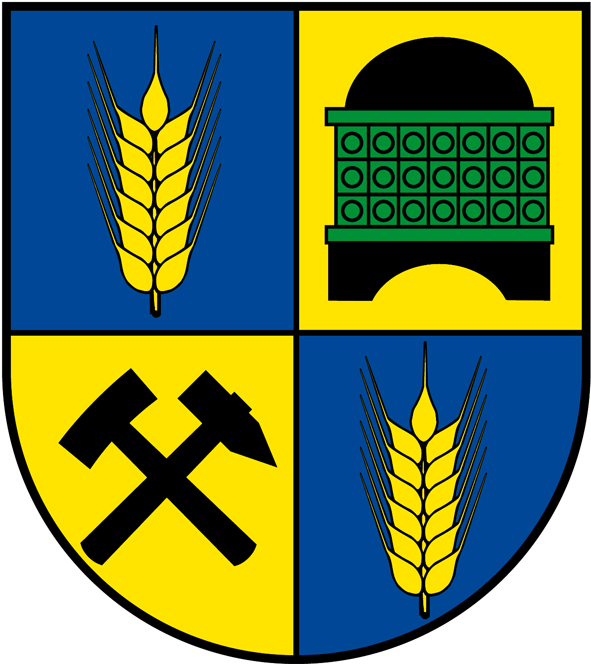
- Coat of arms
- Interactive map of Möhlau
- Location within Germany Location within Saxony-Anhalt
- Coordinates: 51°44′N 12°21′E
- Country: Germany
- State: Saxony-Anhalt
- District: Wittenberg
- Town: Gräfenhainichen

Area
  - Total: 24.77 km^{2} (9.56 sq mi)
- Elevation: 83 m (272 ft)

Population (2009-12-31)
  - Total: 1,961
  - Density: 79.17/km^{2} (205.0/sq mi)
- Time zone: UTC+01:00 (CET)
  - Summer (DST): UTC+02:00 (CEST)
- Postal codes: 06772
- Dialling codes: 034953
- Vehicle registration: WB
- Website: www.graefenhainichen.de

Möhlau (German pronunciation: [ˈmøːlaʊ]) is a village and a former municipality in Wittenberg district in Saxony-Anhalt, Germany. Since 1 January 2011, it is part of the town Gräfenhainichen. It was part of the administrative community (Verwaltungsgemeinschaft) of Tor zur Dübener Heide.

== Geography ==
The community lies on the southern edge of Wittenberg district about 9 km west of the former district seat of Gräfenhainichen and about 18 km southeast of Dessau, right on the border with Saxony.

== Geology ==
The municipal area is strongly marked by brown coal strip mining. Most of the old pits have flooded since they were shut down and are now used as bathing ponds.

== Subdivisions ==
Möhlau consists of the subdivisions of Golpa, Rothehaus, Großmöhlau, and Kleinmöhlau.

== History ==
Möhlau is said to have been settled originally by Slavs. It had its first documentary mention on 12 December 1200 when a church was consecrated in Wörlitz, about 25 km away.
