= Gräfenhainichen =

- Town
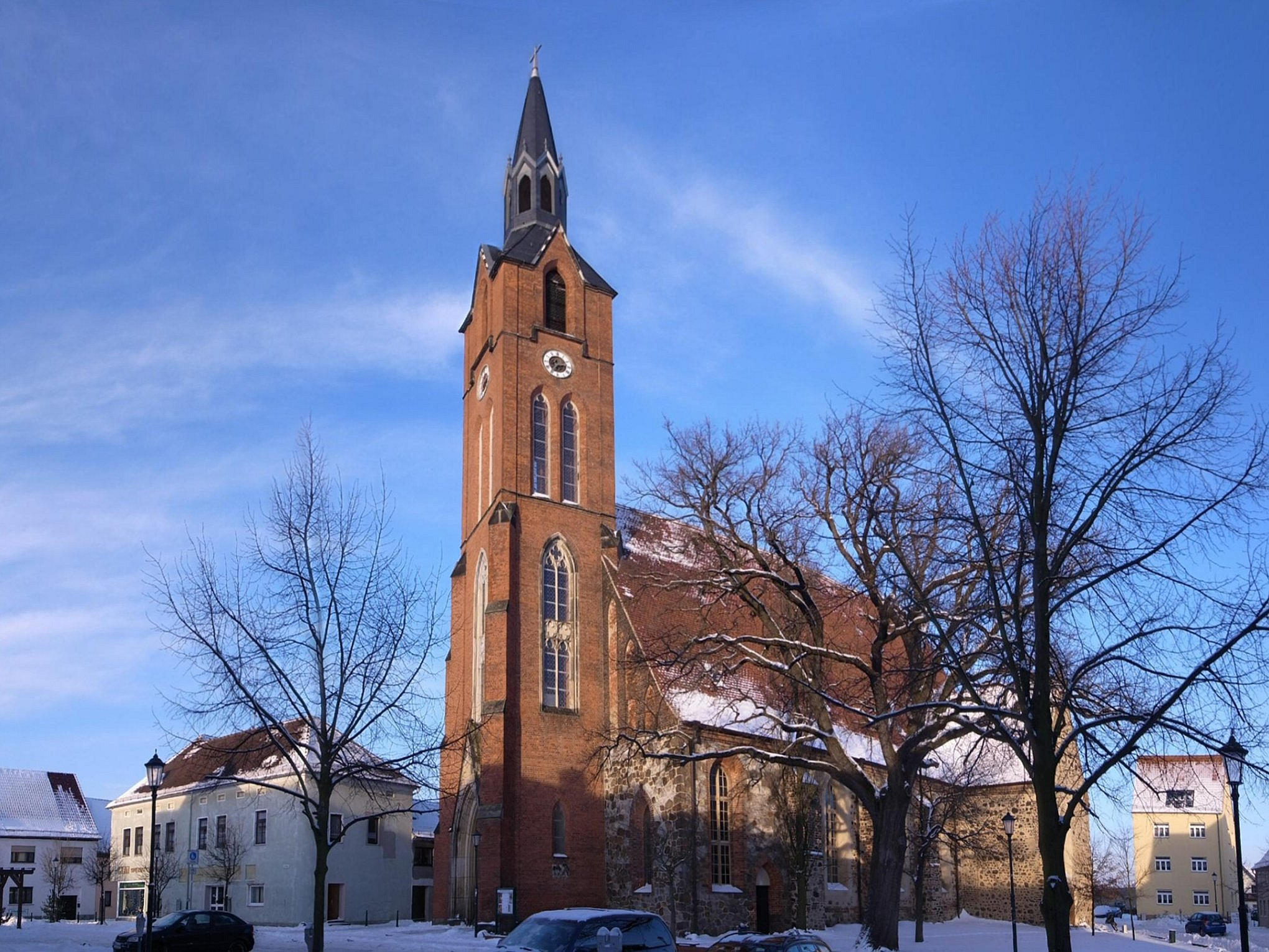
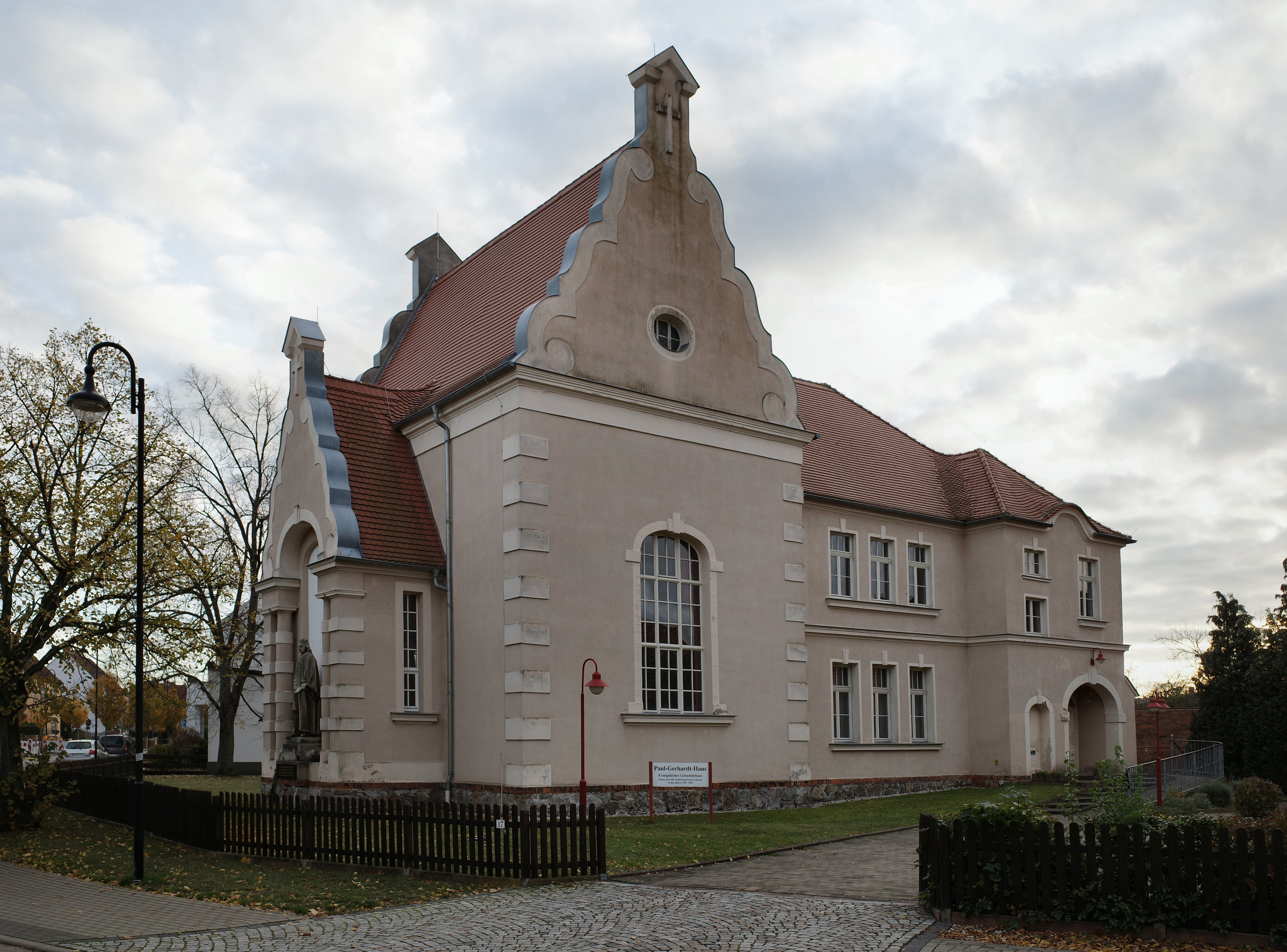
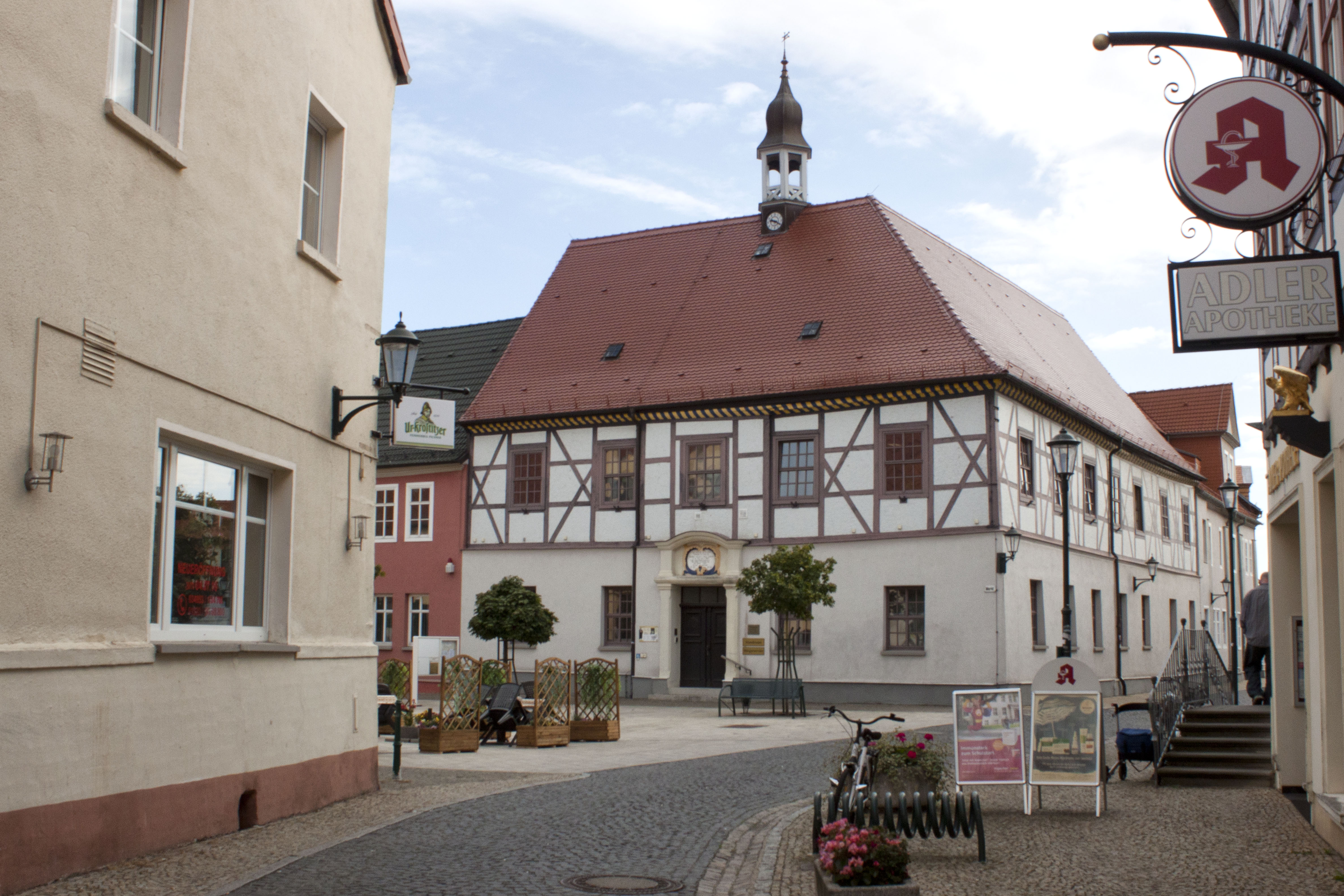
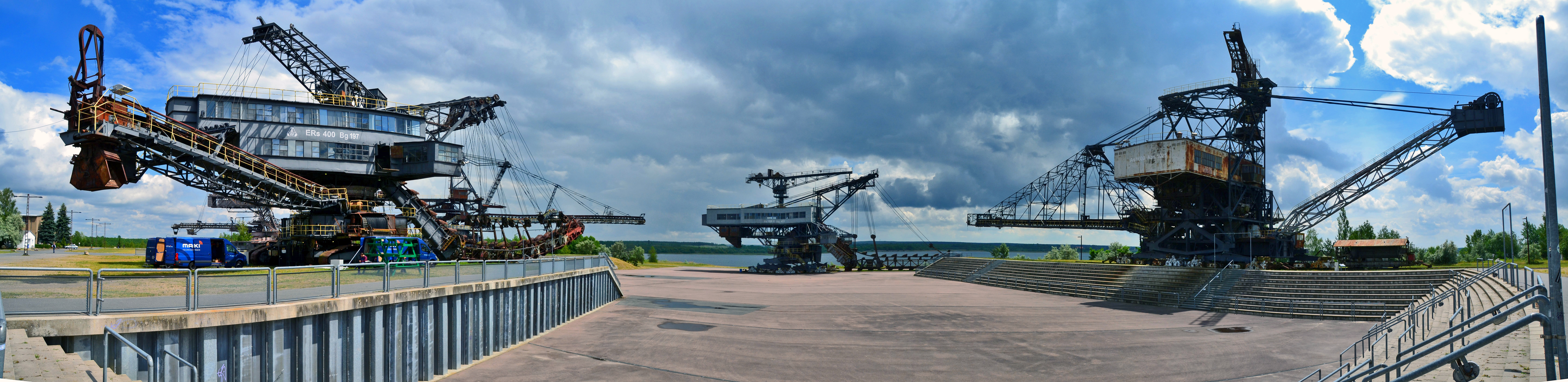
- St. Marien church Paul Gerhardt house Townhall Ferropolis

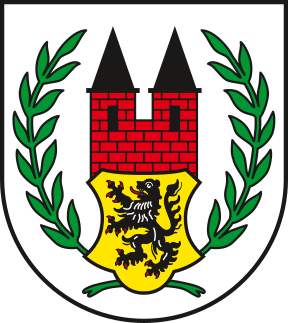
- Coat of arms

- Location of Gräfenhainichen within Wittenberg district
- Interactive map of Gräfenhainichen
- Location within Germany Location within Saxony-Anhalt
- Coordinates: 51°43′N 12°26′E
- Country: Germany
- State: Saxony-Anhalt
- District: Wittenberg

Government
  - Mayor (2022–29): Enrico Schilling

Area
  - Total: 158.94 km^{2} (61.37 sq mi)
- Elevation: 90 m (300 ft)

Population (2025-12-31)
  - Total: 10,990
  - Density: 69.15/km^{2} (179.1/sq mi)
- Time zone: UTC+01:00 (CET)
  - Summer (DST): UTC+02:00 (CEST)
- Postal codes: 06773
- Dialling codes: 034953
- Vehicle registration: WB, GHC, JE
- Website: www.graefenhainichen.de

Gräfenhainichen (German pronunciation: [ɡʁɛːfn̩ˈhaɪnɪçn̩]) is a town in the Wittenberg district in Saxony-Anhalt, Germany.

== Geography ==
The town was the seat of the offices of the administrative community (Verwaltungsgemeinschaft) of Tor zur Dübener Heide until it was disbanded in January 2011. It lies about 25 km southwest of Lutherstadt Wittenberg, southeast of Dessau and northeast of Bitterfeld on the edge of the Düben Heath.

Nearby lies the Gremminer See, a lake created as a result of the redevelopment of the former brown coal strip mine of Golpa-Nord, and on whose shore is found the Ferropolis ("Iron Town") industrial memorial, currently a museum dedicated to "industrial culture".

The town Gräfenhainichen consists of the following Ortschaften or municipal divisions:

- Gräfenhainichen
- Jüdenberg
- Möhlau
- Schköna
- Tornau
- Zschornewitz

== History ==
Gräfenhainichen was first mentioned in writing in 1254. In 1454, Gräfenhainichen had its town rights reconfirmed after the old documents by which these were granted had been destroyed in a fire. In 1637, during the Thirty Years' War, the town was almost completely destroyed by the Swedes. The year 1859 saw the dedication of the new railway line between Wittenberg and Bitterfeld. The town's advantageous location allowed industry to move into town. The first printing shop was set up in 1874; until 1990, there were still as many as four printing shops in Gräfenhainichen. By 1890, brown coal was being mined in Gräfenhainichen, first underground, and then in strip mines. In 1954, at which time the town was in East Germany, Gräfenhainichen became a district seat (Kreisstadt) for three towns and 27 communities. This lasted until 1994, four years after Reunification.

== Coat of arms ==
The town's current civic arms were granted on 17 December 1993. The town's oldest known seal dates from 1477, and the current arms are based on this. The tower stands for the old fortified city and the inescutcheon with the lion rampant, being Meißen's arms, recalls that in 1377, the Counts of Meißen became the local overlords. Until 1993, Gräfenhainichen's coat of arms was of a similar design, but with the heraldic elements arranged slightly differently, and with different colours. The old arms were predominantly red.

=== Mayors ===
- 2001-2015: Harry Rüßbült (The Left)
- Since 2015: Enrico Schilling (CDU).

=== Town partnerships ===
Gräfenhainichen maintains partnerships with the following towns:

- (Germany) Laubach, Hesse, since 1992
- Élancourt, France, since 2003
- Zoersel, Belgium, since August 2005

== Transportation ==
Gräfenhainichen lies on the Bundesstraße federal highway, B 107, running from Bad Düben to Coswig, on the B 100 from Wittenberg to Bitterfeld, and on the Landesstraße (state road) L136 to Zschornewitz.

The Dessau-Ost interchange with the A9 autobahn (Munich - Berlin) is about 17 km away.

Gräfenhainichen's railway station lies on the Deutsche Bahn line between Wittenberg and Bitterfeld.

== Notable people ==
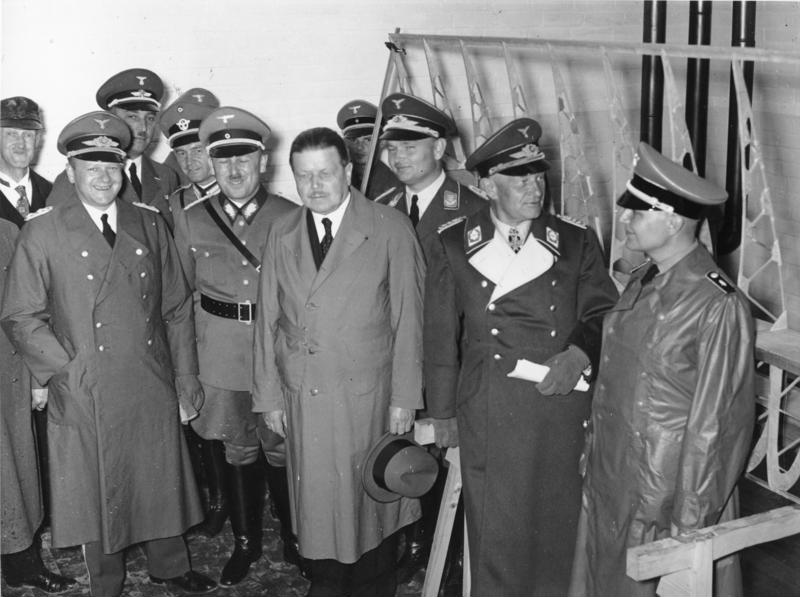
Wilhelm Ohnesorge 1937 mid, with hat in his hand

- Joachim Gottlob Am Ende, theologian and teacher
- Paul Gerhardt, (1607-1676), theologian and hymn writer
- Johann Gottfried Galle, (1812-1910), astronomer
- Hugo Winckler, (1863-1913), archaeologist and linguist
- Wilhelm Ohnesorge (1872-1962), politician (NSDAP), Reichspostminister (minister for mail)
- Niclas Matthei, known as Anzeigenhauptmeister

== Clubs ==
- Anglerverein Gräfenhainichen e.V. von 1959 (angling club)
- dashrecords e.V.
- Deutscher Amateur-Radio-Club e.V.
- Ferropolis Bergbau- u. Erlebnisbahn e.V Gräfenhainichen (Ferropolis Mining and Adventure Railway)
- Ferropolis-Schule Gräfenhainichen Förderverein e.V. (Ferropolis School of Gräfenhainichen Development Club)
- Gräfenhainicher Carneval Club e.V. von 1973

== Miscellaneous ==
Nationwide attention was drawn to Gräfenhainichen in February 2024 due to Niclas Matthei, who, as a self-proclaimed "Anzeigenhauptmeister" (English: Chief Reporting Officer), had reported nearly 10% of the residents in his hometown in 2023, primarily for violations of the Road Traffic Regulations (StVO). Additionally, he bombarded members of the volunteer fire department of Gräfenhainichen with complaints about their conduct. With the aim of having reported at least one corresponding person in every city and municipality in Germany, he also expanded his reporting activities to various cities and municipalities across the country, which regional media extensively covered. Meanwhile, according to Mayor Enrico Schilling, the city of Gräfenhainichen is examining legal measures to stop Matthei's actions. The case has also been reported internationally. In an interview, Matthei stated that, in response to hostility towards him, he routinely filed complaints for defamation and bodily harm, which he could "cash in" on.
