= Ferropolis =

Open-air industrial museum in Germany

Coordinates: 51°45′42″N 12°26′56″E

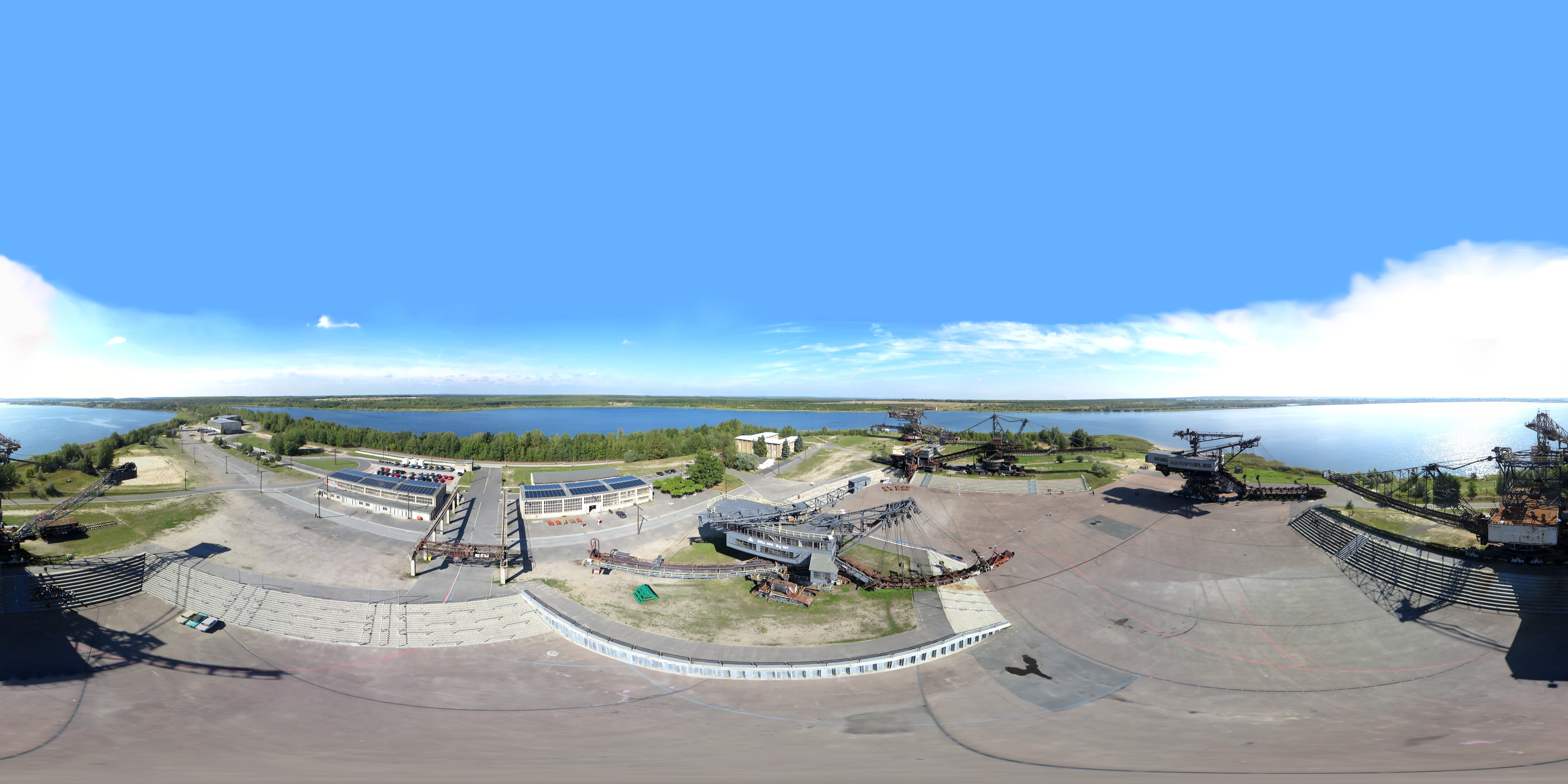
Panorama view over Ferropolis

Ferropolis, "the city of iron", is an open-air museum of huge mid-20th century industrial machines in Gräfenhainichen, a city between Wittenberg and Dessau, Germany. These can measure up to 30 meters high and 120 meters long and weigh up to 1,980 tons. The area is also used for several events such as opera performances or music festivals, including the Splash! Festival, Melt! Festival, and the "Ferropolis in Flammen" ("Ferropolis in flames") festival, as well as some drifting events such as Drift Masters.

== History ==
The museum is located on the site of a former strip mining operation. The minister of finance of the Saxony-Anhalt formally created the project on 14 December 1995. In December 2005, the museum was integrated into the "European Route of Industrial Heritage".

== Gallery ==
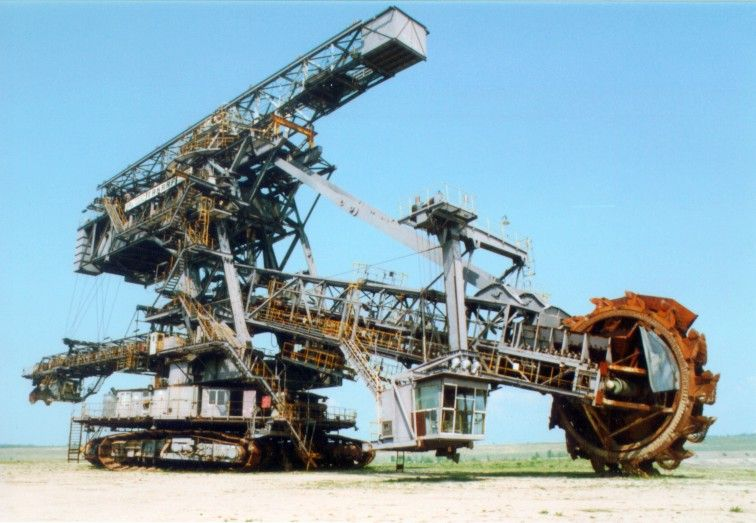
Bucket-wheel excavator

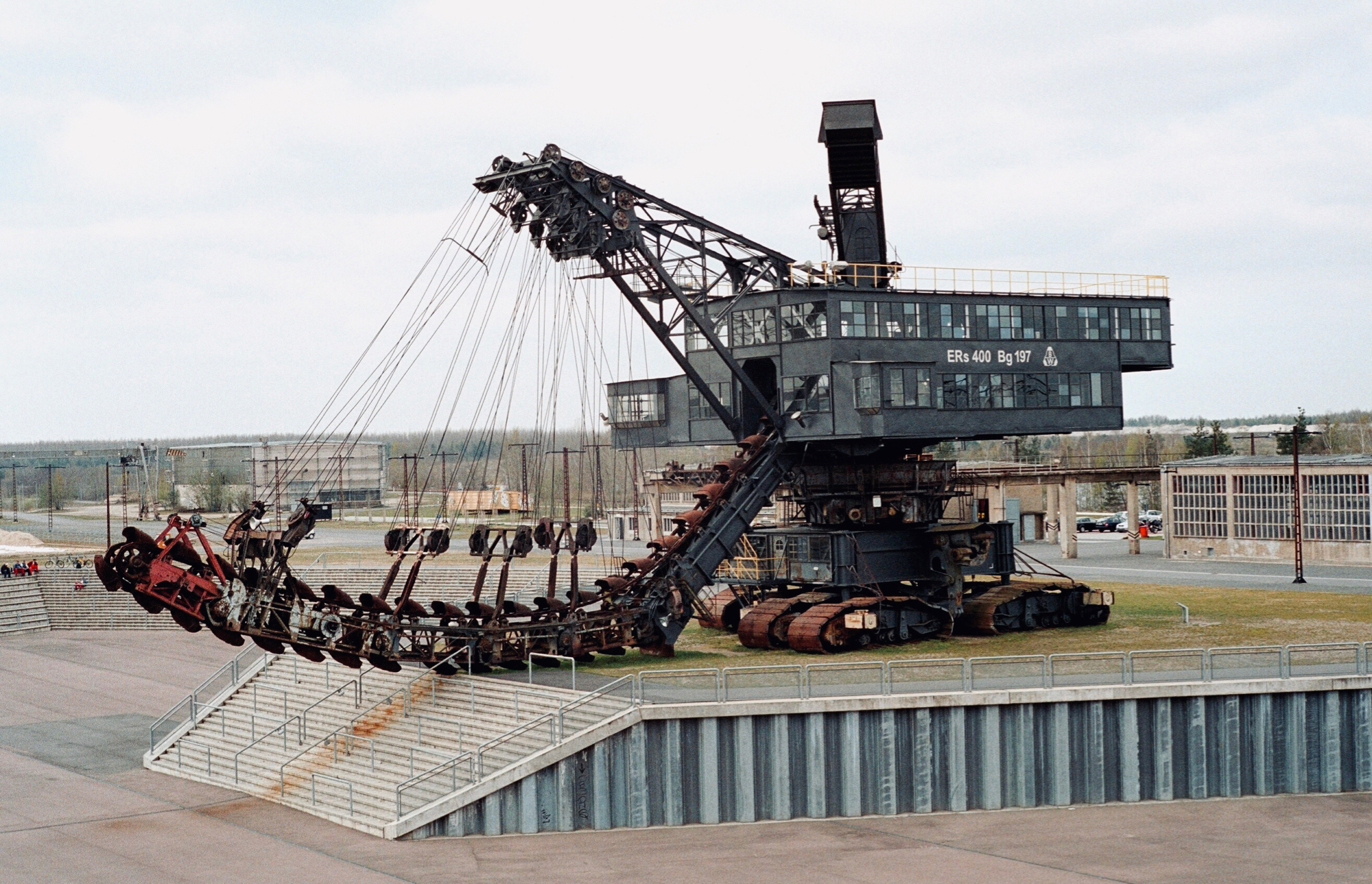
A huge machine on display at Ferropolis

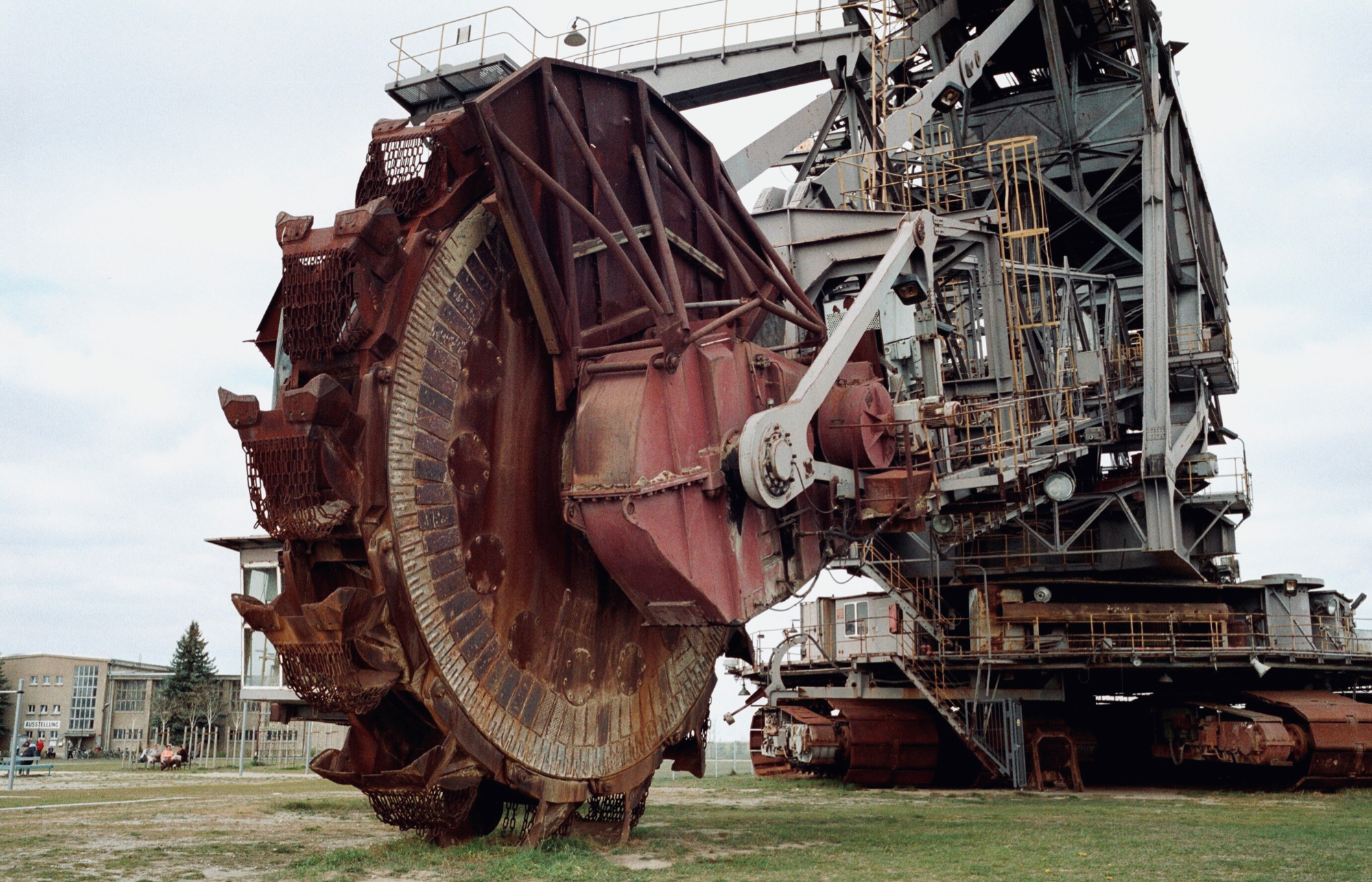
A machine on display at Ferropolis
