= List of songs recorded by Pet Shop Boys =

This is a comprehensive list of songs recorded by English synth-pop duo Pet Shop Boys (Neil Tennant and Chris Lowe). The list includes officially released songs that have been performed by the band. Remixes and live recordings are not listed, unless the song has only been released in one of those formats. Tracks are listed as having been released on their respective albums, unless a single has no associated album. Where a song has appeared on multiple albums, the first appearance is listed. The year is the date of the first release of the song performed by Pet Shop Boys.

== Songs ==
Title	Year	Album	Author(s)	Notes
"Absolutely Fabulous"	1994	Very: Further Listening 1992–1994	Tennant, Lowe, Jennifer Saunders, Joanna Lumley	Released as a single for Comic Relief under the name Absolutely Fabulous, featuring soundbites from the TV show.
"Adrenaline"	2024	Nonetheless Expanded Edition	Tennant, Lowe	Bonus track on the expanded edition of Nonetheless.
"After the Event"	2009	Fundamental: Further Listening 2005–2007	Tennant, Lowe	Bonus track on the single "Did You See Me Coming?" from Yes.
"All Over the World"	2009	Yes	Tennant, Lowe	
"All the Young Dudes"	2024	Nonetheless Expanded Edition	David Bowie	Bonus track on the expanded edition of Nonetheless. Also a double A-side single with "New London Boy" and in a medley with "West End Girls".
"Alone Again (Naturally)"	2005	Release: Further Listening 2001–2004	Gilbert O'Sullivan	Featuring Elton John. First released on a Gilbert O'Sullivan promo in 2005.
"Always"	2002	Release: Further Listening 2001–2004	Tennant, Lowe	Bonus track on CD1 single "Home and Dry" from Release.
"Always on My Mind"	1987	Introspective	Wayne Carson, Johnny Christopher, Mark James	Released as a non-album single in 1987. A re-recorded version "Always on My Mind/In My House" is on the album Introspective.
"Angelic Thug"	2020	My Beautiful Laundrette	Tennant, Lowe	Recorded for the stage play My Beautiful Laundrette.
"Answer the Phone"	2017	Fundamental: Further Listening 2005–2007	Tennant, Lowe	20-second ringtone.
"At Rock Bottom"	2020		Tennant, Lowe	Bonus track on the single "Monkey Business" from Hotspot.
"Axis"	2013	Electric	Tennant, Lowe	First single from the album.
"Baby"	2012	Release: Further Listening 2001–2004	Tennant, Lowe	Bonus track on the single "Leaving" from Elysium. Written in 2003; included in part in the ballet The Most Incredible Thing (2011).
"Beautiful Laundrette"	2020	My Beautiful Laundrette	Tennant, Lowe	Recorded for the stage play My Beautiful Laundrette.
"Beautiful People"	2009	Yes	Tennant, Lowe	Third single from the album.
"Beauty Has Laid Siege to the City"	2024		Tennant, Lowe	Bonus track on the single "New London Boy/All the Young Dudes" from Nonetheless.
"Before"	1996	Bilingual	Tennant, Lowe	First single from the album.
"Being Boring"	1990	Behaviour	Tennant, Lowe	Second single from the album.
"Believe/Song for Guy"	1997	Nightlife: Further Listening 1996–2000	Elton John, Bernie Taupin; arr. Pet Shop Boys	Featuring Elton John. Medley created for the 1997 TV programme An Audience with Elton John.
"Bet She's Not Your Girlfriend"	1990	Alternative	Tennant, Lowe	B-side of "Where the Streets Have No Name (I Can't Take My Eyes Off You)." Also a bonus track on the Japanese version of Behaviour and on Behaviour: Further Listening 1990–1991.
"Betrayed"	1996	Bilingual: Further Listening 1995–1997	Tennant, Lowe	Bonus track on the CD1 single "Se a vida é."
"Between Two Islands"	2002	Release: Further Listening 2001–2004	Tennant, Lowe, Leon Ware, Arthur "T-Boy" Ross	Bonus track on CD1 single "I Get Along" from Release. Contains an excerpt from "I Want You" by Ware and Ross.
"Birthday Boy"	2002	Release	Tennant, Lowe	Includes a sample of "In the Bleak Midwinter" by Christina Rossetti and Harold Darke performed by the Choir and Orchestra of Clare College, Cambridge
"Blue on Blue"	2006	Release: Further Listening 2001–2004	Tennant, Lowe	Bonus track on the single "Minimal" from Fundamental.
"Bolshy"	2013	Electric	Tennant, Lowe	
"Boy Strange"	1999	Nightlife	Tennant, Lowe	
"The Boy Who Couldn't Keep His Clothes On"	1997	Bilingual: Further Listening 1995–1997	Tennant, Lowe	Bonus track on CD1 single "A Red Letter Day."
"Break 4 Love"	2002		Vaughan Mason	Bonus track on CD2 single "Home and Dry" from Release. Cover of song by Raze.
"Breathing Space"	2012	Elysium	Tennant, Lowe	
"Bright Young Things"	2006	Release: Further Listening 2001–2004	Tennant, Lowe	Written but not used for the movie Bright Young Things. Bonus track on the CD single "Numb" from Fundamental.
"Building a Wall"	2009	Yes	Tennant, Lowe	
"Bullet for Narcissus"	2024	Nonetheless	Tennant, Lowe	
"Burn"	2016	Super	Tennant, Lowe	
"Burning the Heather"	2019	Hotspot	Tennant, Lowe	Second single from the album.
"Call Me Old-Fashioned"	2017	Nightlife: Further Listening 1996–2000	Tennant, Lowe	Demo of a song for the musical Closer to Heaven.
"The Calm Before the Storm"	1996	Bilingual: Further Listening 1995–1997	Tennant, Lowe	Bonus track on CD1 single "Single-Bilingual."
"Can You Forgive Her?"	1993	Very	Tennant, Lowe	First single from the album.
"Casanova in Hell"	2006	Fundamental	Tennant, Lowe	
"Casting a Shadow"	1999	Nightlife: Further Listening 1996–2000	Tennant, Lowe	Written for a BBC Radio One programme on a solar eclipse in 1999. Bonus track on CD2 single "New York City Boy."
"A Certain 'Je Ne Sais Quoi'"	2012	Fundamental: Further Listening 2005–2007	Tennant, Lowe	Bonus track on the single "Winner" from Elysium.
"Clean Air Hybrid Electric Bus"	2024	Nonetheless: Furthermore (Japan)	Tennant, Lowe	Bonus track on the Japanese edition of the Furthermore EP. Also a bonus track on the remixes single of "New London Boy/All the Young Dudes".
"Closer to Heaven"	1999	Nightlife	Tennant, Lowe	
"A Cloud in a Box"	2016		Tennant, Lowe	Bonus track on the single "Say It to Me" from Super.
"Confidential"	1996	Very: Further Listening 1992–1994	Tennant, Lowe	Demo of a song written for Tina Turner. Included as a bonus track on CD2 single "Single-Bilingual" from Bilingual.
"Cricket Wife"	2021		Tennant, Lowe	Released as a fan club single with the 2021 edition of "Annually" and as a digital download.
"Dancing in the Dusk"	2017	Fundamental: Further Listening 2005–2007	Sondre Lerche	
"Dancing Star"	2024	Nonetheless	Tennant, Lowe	Second single from the album.
"The Dark End of the Street"	2024	Nonetheless Expanded Edition	James Carr	Bonus track on the expanded edition of Nonetheless.
"The Dead Can Dance"	2016		Tennant, Lowe	Bonus track on the single "Say It to Me" from Super.
"Decadence"	1994	Alternative	Tennant, Lowe	B-side of "Liberation." Also on Very: Further Listening 1992–1994.
"Decide"	2019		Tennant, Lowe	Bonus track on the single "Burning the Heather" from Hotspot.
"Delusions of Grandeur"	1997	Bilingual: Further Listening 1995–1997	Tennant, Lowe	Bonus track on CD1 single "A Red Letter Day."
"The Dictator Decides"	2016	Super	Tennant, Lowe	
"Did You See Me Coming?"	2009	Yes	Tennant, Lowe	Second single from the album.
"A Different Point of View"	1993	Very	Tennant, Lowe	
"Disco Potential"	1997	Bilingual: Further Listening 1995–1997	Tennant, Lowe	Bonus track on CD2 of "Somewhere."
"Discoteca"	1996	Bilingual	Tennant, Lowe	
"DJ Culture"	1991	Discography: The Complete Singles Collection	Tennant, Lowe	Also on Behaviour: Further Listening 1990–1991.
"Do I Have To?"	1987	Alternative	Tennant, Lowe	B-side of "Always on My Mind." Also on Actually: Further Listening 1987–1988.
"Domino Dancing"	1988	Introspective	Tennant, Lowe	First single from the album.
"Don Juan"	1988	Alternative	Tennant, Lowe	B-side of "Domino Dancing." Also on Introspective: Further Listening 1988–1989.
"Dreaming of the Queen"	1993	Very	Tennant, Lowe	
"Dreamland"	2019	Hotspot	Tennant, Lowe, Olly Alexander	First single from Hotspot. Features Years and Years.
"The Dumpling Song"	2017	Yes: Further Listening 2008–2010	Tennant, Lowe, David Almond	Written for a children's play of My Dad's a Birdman.
"Ego Music"	2012	Elysium	Tennant, Lowe	
"Electricity"	1996	Bilingual	Tennant, Lowe	
"E-Mail"	2002	Release	Tennant, Lowe	
"The End of the World"	1990	Behaviour	Tennant, Lowe	
"Entschuldigung!"	2013		Tennant, Lowe	Bonus track on the single "Love Is a Bourgeois Construct" from Electric.
"Euroboy"	1994	Alternative	Tennant, Lowe	Bonus track on the single "Yesterday, When I Was Mad." Included on Very: Further Listening 1992–1994.
"Everybody Will Dance"	2024		Tennant, Lowe	Bonus track on the single "Feel" from Nonetheless.
"Everything Means Something"	2012	Elysium	Tennant, Lowe	
"A Face Like That"	2012	Elysium	Tennant, Lowe	
"Falling"	2001	Bilingual: Further Listening 1995–1997	Tennant, Lowe	Demo of a song written for Kylie Minogue.
"Feel"	2024	Nonetheless	Tennant, Lowe	Fourth single from the album.
"Flamboyant"	2003	PopArt: The Hits	Tennant, Lowe	Written as a single for the PopArt compilation. Two versions are on Release: Further Listening 2001–2004.
"Fluorescent"	2013	Electric	Tennant, Lowe	
"Footsteps"	1999	Nightlife	Tennant, Lowe	
"For All of Us"	2017	Nightlife: Further Listening 1996–2000	Tennant, Lowe	Demo of a song for the musical Closer to Heaven. Two versions are included on Nightlife: Further Listening 1996–2000.
"For Your Own Good"	1999	Nightlife	Tennant, Lowe	
"Forever in Love"	1993	Very Relentless	Tennant, Lowe	Appears on bonus disc Relentless.
"The Forgotten Child"	2019	Agenda (EP)	Tennant, Lowe	Released on CD with the 2019 edition of "Annually" and as a digital download.
"The Former Enfant Terrible"	2009	Fundamental: Further Listening 2005–2007	Tennant, Lowe	Bonus track on the single "Did You See Me Coming?" from Yes.
"Friendly Fire"	2002	Nightlife: Further Listening 1996–2000	Tennant, Lowe	Written for the musical Closer to Heaven. Included as a bonus track on the single "I Get Along" from Release.
"Fugitive"	2006	Fundamental: Further Listening 2005–2007	Tennant, Lowe	Also on a limited edition of Fundamental including the bonus CD Fundamentalism.
"Generic Jingle"	1991	Behaviour: Further Listening 1990–1991	Tennant, Lowe	Recorded for the Simon Bates show on BBC Radio One.
"Get It Online"	2013		Tennant, Lowe	Bonus track on the single "Love Is a Bourgeois Construct" from Electric.
"The Ghost of Myself"	1999	Nightlife: Further Listening 1996–2000	Tennant, Lowe	Bonus track on CD1 single "New York City Boy."
"Gin and Jag"	2009	Yes: Further Listening 2008–2010	Tennant, Lowe	Bonus track on the single "Love Etc."
"Girls and Boys"	1995	Very: Further Listening 1992–1994	Blur	Live version performed in Rio on the Discovery Tour. B-side of "Paninaro '95."
"Girls Don't Cry"	2006	Fundamental: Further Listening 2005–2007	Tennant, Lowe	Bonus track on the single "I'm with Stupid."
"Give It a Go"	2012	Elysium	Tennant, Lowe	
"Give Stupidity a Chance"	2019	Agenda (EP)	Tennant, Lowe	Released on CD with the 2019 edition of "Annually" and as a digital download.
"Glad All Over"	2010	Yes: Further Listening 2008–2010	Dave Clark, Mike Smith	Cover of the song by The Dave Clark Five. Bonus track on the single "Together" from Ultimate.
"Go West"	1993	Very	Tennant, Lowe, Jacques Morali, Henri Belolo, Victor Willis	Second single from the album. Cover of The Village People 1979 single.
"God Willing"	2006	Fundamental	Tennant, Lowe	
"Groovy"	2016	Super	Tennant, Lowe	
"Happiness"	2016	Super	Tennant, Lowe	
"Happiness Is an Option"	1999	Nightlife	Tennant, Lowe, George Clinton, Rachmaninoff	Music based on Vocalise by Rachmaninoff; contains a recreated sample from the George Clinton Mixman Soundisc MIXSD-001.
"Happy People"	2020	Hotspot	Tennant, Lowe	
"Heart"	1987	Actually	Tennant, Lowe	Fourth single from the album.
"Hell"	2012	Elysium: Further Listening 2011–2012	Tennant, Lowe	Bonus track on the single "Leaving."
"Here"	2002	Release	Tennant, Lowe	
"Hey, Headmaster"	1993	Alternative	Tennant, Lowe	B-side of "Can You Forgive Her?" Also on Very: Further Listening 1992–1994.
"Hit and Miss"	1996	Bilingual: Further Listening 1995–1997	Tennant, Lowe	Bonus track on CD1 single "Before."
"Hit Music"	1987	Actually	Tennant, Lowe	
"Hold On"	2012	Elysium	Tennant, Lowe, Handel	Music based on Eternal Source of Light Divine by Handel.
"Home and Dry"	2002	Release	Tennant, Lowe	First single from the album.
"Hoping for a Miracle"	2020	Hotspot	Tennant, Lowe	
"How Can You Expect to Be Taken Seriously?"	1990	Behaviour	Tennant, Lowe	Third single from the album.
"How I Learned to Hate Rock 'n' Roll"	1996	Bilingual: Further Listening 1995–1997	Tennant, Lowe	Bonus track on the CD1 single "Se a vida é."
"Hymn (In memoriam Alexei Navalny)"	2025		Tennant, Lowe	Released on Youtube on 20 February 2025
"I Cried for Us"	2010	Yes: Further Listening 2008–2010	Kate McGarrigle; arr. Lowe	Arrangement for a performance at a memorial for the songwriter. Bonus track on the single "Together" from Ultimate.
"I Didn't Get Where I Am Today"	2004	Release: Further Listening 2001–2004	Tennant, Lowe, Dave Lambert	Includes a guitar sample from "Father's Name Is Dad" by Fire. Bonus track on the CD single "Flamboyant."
"I Don't Know What You Want But I Can't Give It Any More"	1999	Nightlife	Tennant, Lowe	First single from the album.
"I Don't Wanna"	2020	Hotspot	Tennant, Lowe	Fourth single from the album.
"I Get Along"	2002	Release	Tennant, Lowe	Second single from the album.
"I Get Excited (You Get Excited Too)"	1988	Alternative	Tennant, Lowe	B-side of "Heart." Also on Introspective: Further Listening 1988–1989.
"I Made My Excuses and Left"	2006	Fundamental	Tennant, Lowe	
"I Started a Joke"	2012	Elysium: Further Listening 2011–2012	Barry Gibb, Maurice Gibb, Robin Gibb	Bonus track on the single "Winner."
"I Want a Dog"	1988	Introspective	Tennant, Lowe	Original version was the B-side of "Rent" and is on Actually: Further Listening 1987-1988. Remix by Frankie Knuckles is on Introspective.
"I Want a Lover"	1986	Please	Tennant, Lowe	
"I Want To Wake Up"	1987	Actually	Tennant, Lowe	
"I Will Fall"	2023	Lost (EP)	Tennant, Lowe	Released on CD with the 2023 edition of "Annually" and as a digital download.
"I Wouldn't Normally Do This Kind of Thing"	1993	Very	Tennant, Lowe	Third single from the album.
"If Jesus Had a Sister"	2024		Tennant, Lowe	Bonus track on the single "Dancing Star" from Nonetheless.
"If Looks Could Kill"	2002	Disco 3	Tennant, Lowe	Also recorded for a John Peel session in 2002. Both versions are on Release: Further Listening 2001–2004.
"If Love Were All"	1994	Alternative	Noël Coward	Bonus track on the single "Yesterday, When I Was Mad." Included on Very: Further Listening 1992–1994.
"I'm Not Scared"	1988	Introspective	Tennant, Lowe	Originally recorded by Eighth Wonder.
"I'm With Stupid"	2006	Fundamental	Tennant, Lowe	First single from the album.
"In Bits"	2016		Tennant, Lowe	Bonus track on the single "The Pop Kids" from Super.
"In Denial"	1999	Nightlife	Tennant, Lowe	Duet with Kylie Minogue.
"In His Imagination"	2012	Elysium: Further Listening 2011–2012	Tennant, Lowe	Bonus track on the single "Leaving."
"In My House"	1988	Introspective	Tennant, Lowe	Part of medley with "Always on My Mind".
"In Private"	2006	Release: Further Listening 2001–2004	Tennant, Lowe	Featuring Elton John. Also on the Fundamentalism bonus disc of Fundamental. Originally written for Dusty Springfield.
"In Slow Motion"	2017	Elysium: Further Listening 2011–2012	Tennant, Lowe	
"In the Night"	1985	Disco	Tennant, Lowe	Original version with lyrics was the B-side of the 1985 single "Opportunities." An instrumental version was the theme for The Clothes Show starting in 1987; it was re-recorded in 1995 and included as a bonus track on the singles "Paninaro '95" and "Before".
"Indefinite Leave to Remain"	2006	Fundamental	Tennant, Lowe	
"Inner Sanctum"	2016	Super	Tennant, Lowe	Third single from the album.
"Inside"	2012	Elysium: Further Listening 2011–2012	Tennant, Lowe	Bonus track on the single "Memory of the Future."
"Inside a Dream"	2013	Electric	Tennant, Lowe	
"Integral"	2006	Fundamental	Tennant, Lowe	
"Into Thin Air"	2016	Super	Tennant, Lowe	
"Invisible"	2012	Elysium	Tennant, Lowe	
"It Always Comes as a Surprise"	1996	Bilingual	Tennant, Lowe	
"It Couldn't Happen Here"	1987	Actually	Tennant, Lowe, Ennio Morricone	
"It Doesn't Often Snow at Christmas"	1997	Christmas (EP)	Tennant, Lowe	Originally issued as a fan club single in 1997; also on Nightlife: Further Listening 1996–2000. A re-recorded version is on the 2009 Christmas EP and on Yes: Further Listening 2008–2010.
"It Must Be Obvious"	1990	Alternative	Tennant, Lowe	B-side of "So Hard." Also on Behaviour: Further Listening 1990–1991.
"It's Alright"	1988	Introspective	Sterling Void, Marshall Jefferson, Paris Brightledge	Third single from the album.
"It's a Sin"	1987	Actually	Tennant, Lowe	First single from the album.
"It's Not a Crime"	2024		Tennant, Lowe	Bonus track on the single "A New Bohemia" from Nonetheless.
"I've Got Plans (Involving You)"	2024		Tennant, Lowe	Bonus track on the single "A New Bohemia" from Nonetheless.
"Jack and Jill Party"	2004	Release: Further Listening 2001–2004	Tennant, Lowe	Recorded as a single with Pete Burns and later included on the Dead or Alive boxset Sophisticated Boom Box MMXVI. The Pet Shop Boys-only demo is on Release: Further Listening 2001-2004.
"Jack the Lad"	1986	Alternative	Tennant, Lowe	B-side of "Suburbia." Also on Please: Further Listening 1984–1986.
"Je t'aime... moi non plus"	1999		Serge Gainsbourg	Bonus track on CD2 single "I Don't Know What You Want But I Can't Give It Any More". Features Sam Taylor-Wood on vocals.
"Jealousy"	1990	Behaviour	Tennant, Lowe	Fourth single from the album.
"Johnny’s Dark Side"	2020	My Beautiful Laundrette	Tennant, Lowe	Recorded for the stage play My Beautiful Laundrette.
"Johnny’s Theme"	2020	My Beautiful Laundrette	Tennant, Lowe	Recorded for the stage play My Beautiful Laundrette.
"Kaputnik"	2023	Lost (EP)	Tennant, Lowe	Released on CD with the 2023 edition of "Annually" and as a digital download.
"Kazak"	2017	Release: Further Listening 2001–2004	Tennant, Lowe	
"KDX 125"	1993	Very Relentless	Tennant, Lowe	Appears on bonus disc Relentless.
"King of Rome"	2009	Yes	Tennant, Lowe	
"King's Cross"	1987	Actually	Tennant, Lowe	
"The Last to Die"	2013	Electric	Bruce Springsteen	
"Later Tonight"	1986	Please	Tennant, Lowe	
"Leaving"	2012	Elysium	Tennant, Lowe	Second single from the album.
"Left to My Own Devices"	1988	Introspective	Tennant, Lowe	Second single from the album.
"Legacy"	2009	Yes	Tennant, Lowe	
"Liberation"	1993	Very	Tennant, Lowe	Fourth single from the album.
"Lies"	1999	Nightlife: Further Listening 1996–2000	Tennant, Lowe	Bonus track on CD1 single "You Only Tell Me You Love Me When You're Drunk".
"Listening"	2012	Elysium: Further Listening 2011–2012	Tennant, Lowe	Bonus track on the single "Memory of the Future."
"Living in the Past"	2023	Lost (EP)	Tennant, Lowe	Bonus track on the digital download of Lost.
"London"	2002	Release	Tennant, Lowe, Chris Zippel	Third single from the album.
"Loneliness"	2024	Nonetheless	Tennant, Lowe	First single from the album.
"Losing My Mind"	1991	Alternative	Stephen Sondheim	Demo made for Liza Minnelli. Included as a B-side of "Jealousy" (1991) and on Introspective: Further Listening 1988–1989.
"The Lost Room"	2023	Lost (EP)	Tennant, Lowe	Released on CD with the 2023 edition of "Annually" and as a digital download.
"Love Comes Quickly"	1986	Please	Tennant, Lowe, Stephen Hague	Second single from the album.
"Love Etc."	2009	Yes	Tennant, Lowe, Brian Higgins, Miranda Cooper, Tim Powell, Owen Parker	First single from the album.
"Love Is a Bourgeois Construct"	2013	Electric	Tennant, Lowe, Henry Purcell, Michael Nyman	Third single from the album. Music inspired by Michael Nyman's "Chasing Sheep Is Best Left to Shepherds" which is based on the Prelude to Act III scene 2 from Purcell's King Arthur.
"Love Is a Catastrophe"	2002	Release	Tennant, Lowe	
"Love Is the Law"	2024	Nonetheless	Tennant, Lowe	
"Love Life"	2010	Release: Further Listening 2001–2004	Tennant, Lowe	Non-album single for Record Store Day.
"The Loving Kind"	2017	Yes: Further Listening 2008–2010	Tennant, Lowe, Cooper, Higgins, Powell	First released by Girls Aloud in 2008.
"Luna Park"	2006	Fundamental	Tennant, Lowe	
"A Man Could Get Arrested"	1985	Alternative	Tennant, Lowe	B-side of the 1985 single "West End Girls." Also on Please: Further Listening 1984–1986.
"The Man Who Has Everything"	1993	Very Relentless	Tennant, Lowe	Appears on bonus disc Relentless.
"Memory of the Future"	2012	Elysium	Tennant, Lowe	Third single from the album.
"Metamorphosis"	1996	Bilingual	Tennant, Lowe	
"Minimal"	2006	Fundamental	Tennant, Lowe	Second single from the album.
"Miracles"	2003	PopArt: The Hits	Tennant, Lowe, Adam F, DJ Fresh	Also on Release: Further Listening 2001–2004.
"Miserablism"	1990	Alternative	Tennant, Lowe	B-side of "Was It Worth It?" Also a bonus track on the Japanese version of Behaviour and on Behaviour: Further Listening 1990–1991.
"Miserere"	2024	Nonetheless Expanded Edition	Gregorio Allegri	Bonus track on the expanded edition of Nonetheless.
"Monkey Business"	2020	Hotspot	Tennant, Lowe, Stuart Price	Third single from the album.
"More Than a Dream"	2009	Yes	Tennant, Lowe, Cooper, Higgins, Jason Resch, Kieran Jones	
"Motoring"	2017	Release: Further Listening 2001–2004	Tennant, Lowe	
"Music for Boys"	1991	Alternative	Tennant, Lowe	B-side of "DJ Culture." Also on Behaviour: Further Listening 1990–1991.
"My Girl"	2009	Christmas (EP)	Mike Barson	Cover of a Madness song played at a fundraiser for the family of the late Dainton Connell. Also on Yes: Further Listening 2008–2010.
"My Head Is Spinning"	1993	Very Relentless	Tennant, Lowe	Appears on bonus disc Relentless.
"My October Symphony"	1990	Behaviour	Tennant, Lowe	
"Nervously"	1990	Behaviour	Tennant, Lowe	
"A New Bohemia"	2024	Nonetheless	Tennant, Lowe	Third single from the album.
"New Boy"	2020		Tennant, Lowe	Bonus track on the single "I Don't Wanna" from Hotspot.
"A New Life"	1987	Alternative	Tennant, Lowe, Helena Springs	B-side of "What Have I Done to Deserve This?" from Actually. Also on Actually: Further Listening 1987–1988.
"New London Boy"	2024	Nonetheless	Tennant, Lowe	Fifth single from the album.
"New York City Boy"	1999	Nightlife	Tennant, Lowe, David Morales	Second single from the album. A French language version titled "Paris City Boy" with lyrics by Jérôme Soligny is included on Nightlife: Further Listening 1996–2000.
"The Night I Fell in Love"	2002	Release	Tennant, Lowe	
"The Night Is a Time to Explore Who You Are"	2017	Release: Further Listening 2001–2004	Tennant, Lowe	Demo of a song originally intended but not used for the musical Closer to Heaven.
"Night Sings (Popa's Theme)"	2020	My Beautiful Laundrette	Tennant, Lowe	Recorded for the stage play My Beautiful Laundrette.
"Night Song"	2010	Yes: Further Listening 2008–2010	Tennant, Lowe, Almond	Written for a children's play of My Dad's a Birdman. Released as a fan club download in 2010.
"Nightlife"	2002	Nightlife: Further Listening 1996–2000	Tennant, Lowe	Demo of a song originally intended but not used for the musical Closer to Heaven. Included as a bonus track on the single "Home and Dry" from Release.
"No Boundaries"	2020	My Beautiful Laundrette	Tennant, Lowe	Recorded for the stage play My Beautiful Laundrette. Bonus track on the single "Dreamland" from Hotspot.
"No Excuse"	2017	Release: Further Listening 2001–2004	Tennant, Lowe	
"No More Ballads"	2013		Tennant, Lowe	Bonus track on the single "Thursday" from Electric.
"No Time for Tears"	2005	Battleship Potemkin	Tennant, Lowe	Orchestral mix is on Fundamental: Further Listening 2005–2007.
"Nothing Has Been Proved"	2001	Introspective: Further Listening 1988–1989	Tennant, Lowe	Demo of a song written for Dusty Springfield for the 1989 film Scandal.
"Numb"	2006	Fundamental	Diane Warren	Third single from the album.
"Odd Man Out"	2013		Tennant, Lowe	Bonus track on the single "Thursday" from Electric. Includes a spoken-word sample by Charles Lloyd-Pack from the 1961 film Victim
"Omar's Theme"	2020	My Beautiful Laundrette	Tennant, Lowe	Recorded for the stage play My Beautiful Laundrette.
"On Social Media"	2019	Agenda (EP)	Tennant, Lowe	Released on CD with the 2019 edition of "Annually" and as a digital download.
"One and One Make Five"	1993	Very	Tennant, Lowe	
"One-hit Wonder"	2016		Tennant, Lowe	Bonus track on the single "The Pop Kids" from Super. Originally written in 1981.
"One in a Million"	1993	Very	Tennant, Lowe	
"One More Chance"	1984	Actually	Tennant, Lowe, Bobby Orlando	Original version made with Bobby Orlando released as a single in 1984. Re-written with additional input from Chris Lowe and re-recorded for Actually.
"One Night"	2012	Fundamental: Further Listening 2005–2007	Tennant, Lowe	Bonus track on the single "Memory of the Future" from Elysium.
"One of the Crowd"	1988	Alternative	Tennant, Lowe	B-side of "It's Alright." Also on Introspective: Further Listening.
"One Thing Leads to Another"	1993	Very Relentless	Tennant, Lowe	Appears on bonus disc Relentless.
"One-Way Street"	2017	Fundamental: Further Listening 2005–2007	Tennant, Lowe	
"The Only One"	1999	Nightlife	Tennant, Lowe	
"Only the Dark"	2020	Hotspot	Tennant, Lowe	
"Only the Wind"	1990	Behaviour	Tennant, Lowe	
"An Open Mind"	2019		Tennant, Lowe	Bonus track on the single "Dreamland" from Hotspot.
"Opportunities (Let's Make Lots of Money)"	1985	Please	Tennant, Lowe	Originally released as a single in 1985; re-recorded for the album and released as the third single from Please in 1986.
"Pandemonium"	2009	Yes	Tennant, Lowe	
"Paninaro"	1986	Disco	Tennant, Lowe	Originally released in 1986 as the B-side of "Suburbia" and as a 12" single in Italy featuring the "Italian remix." A new version titled "Paninaro '95" was released in 1995.
"Party in the Blitz"	2024		Tennant, Lowe	Bonus track on the single "Loneliness" from Nonetheless.
"Party Song"	2006	Release: Further Listening 2001–2004	Tennant, Lowe	Bonus track on the CD single "Numb."
"Pazzo!"	2016	Super	Tennant, Lowe	
"The Performance of My Life"	2017	Fundamental: Further Listening 2005–2007	Tennant, Lowe	Demo of a song recorded by Shirley Bassey.
"Pet Shop Boys"	1984		Tennant, Lowe, Orlando	B-side of the original 1984 single of "West End Girls."
"Playing in the Streets"	2017	Nightlife: Further Listening 1996–2000	Tennant, Lowe	
"The Pop Kids"	2016	Super	Tennant, Lowe	First single from the album.
"Positive Role Model"	2002	Disco 3	Tennant, Lowe, Barry White, Tony Sepe, Peter Radcliffe	Bonus track on CD1 single "London" from Release. A version of the song was used in the musical Closer to Heaven. Includes a sample from the Barry White song "You're the First, the Last, My Everything."
"Postscript"	1993	Very	Tennant, Lowe	Hidden track after "Go West."
"A Powerful Friend"	2002	Release: Further Listening 2001–2004	Tennant, Lowe	Recorded for a John Peel session in 2002. Re-recorded and later included as the B-side of "Love Life" for Record Store Day in 2010.
"Psychological"	2006	Fundamental	Tennant, Lowe	
"Radiophonic"	1999	Nightlife	Tennant, Lowe	
"A Red Letter Day"	1996	Bilingual	Tennant, Lowe	Fourth single from the album.
"Rent"	1987	Actually	Tennant, Lowe	Third single from the album.
"Requiem in Denim and Leopardskin"	2012	Elysium	Tennant, Lowe	
"The Resurrectionist"	2006	Fundamental: Further Listening 2005–2007	Tennant, Lowe	Bonus track on the single "I'm with Stupid."
"Reunion"	2017	Release: Further Listening 2001–2004	Tennant, Lowe, Hermansen, Eriksen	
"Ring Road"	2017	Fundamental: Further Listening 2005–2007	Tennant, Lowe	
"Run, Girl, Run"	2001	Release: Further Listening 2001–2004	Tennant, Lowe	Demo of a song written for the musical Closer to Heaven.
"Sad Robot World"	2016	Super	Tennant, Lowe	
"Sail Away"	1999	Nightlife: Further Listening 1996–2000	Noël Coward	Bonus track on CD2 single "You Only Tell Me You Love Me When You're Drunk."
"The Samurai in Autumn"	2002	Release	Tennant, Lowe	
"Saturday Night Forever"	1996	Bilingual	Tennant, Lowe	
"Say It to Me"	2016	Super	Tennant, Lowe, Price	Fourth single from the album.
"The Schlager Hit Parade"	2024	Nonetheless	Tennant, Lowe	A German language version sung by Chris Lowe was released on the single "Feel"
"Screaming"	1998	Nightlife: Further Listening 1996–2000	Tennant, Lowe	Written for the soundtrack of the 1998 version of Psycho Also included as a bonus track on CD1 single "I Don't Know What You Want But I Can't Give It Any More."
"Se a vida é (That's the Way Life Is)"	1996	Bilingual	Tennant, Lowe, Ademario, Wellington Epiderme Negra, Nego do Barbalho	Second single from the album. Based on "Estrada Da Paixão" by African-Brazilian band Olodum.
"Searching for the Face of Jesus"	2002	Release: Further Listening 2001–2004	Tennant, Lowe	Bonus track on CD1 single "I Get Along."
"The Secret of Happiness"	2024	Nonetheless	Tennant, Lowe	
"Sense of Time"	2024		Tennant, Lowe	Bonus track on the single "Dancing Star" from Nonetheless.
"Sexy Northerner"	2002	Release: Further Listening 2001–2004	Tennant, Lowe	Bonus track on CD1 single "Home and Dry."
"Shameless"	1993	Alternative	Tennant, Lowe	B-Side of "Go West." Also on Very: Further Listening 1992–1994.
"She Pops"	2017	Elysium: Further Listening 2011–2012	Tennant, Lowe	
"Shopping"	1987	Actually	Tennant, Lowe	
"Shouting in the Evening"	2013	Electric	Tennant, Lowe	
"Silver Age"	1999	Nightlife: Further Listening 1996–2000	Tennant, Lowe	Bonus track on CD1 single "I Don't Know What You Want But I Can't Give It Any More."
"Single"	1996	Bilingual	Tennant, Lowe	Third single from the album; titled "Single-Bilingual" for the single release.
"Skeletons in the Closet"	2023	Lost (EP)	Tennant, Lowe	Released on CD with the 2023 edition of "Annually" and as a digital download.
"So Hard"	1990	Behaviour	Tennant, Lowe	First single from the album.
"So Sorry, I Said"	2001	Introspective: Further Listening 1988–1989	Tennant, Lowe	Demo of a song written for Liza Minnelli.
"The Sodom and Gomorrah Show"	2006	Fundamental	Tennant, Lowe	
"Some Speculation"	1994	Alternative	Tennant, Lowe	Bonus track on the single "Yesterday, When I Was Mad." Also on Very: Further Listening 1992–1994.
"Somebody Else's Business"	2003	Disco 3	Tennant, Lowe	Also on Nightlife: Further Listening 1996–2000.
"Somewhere"	1997	PopArt: The Hits	Leonard Bernstein, Stephen Sondheim	Released as single for the duo's 3-week residency at the Savoy Theatre. Extended mix included on Bilingual: Further Listening 1995–1997.
"The Sound of the Atom Splitting"	1988	Alternative	Tennant, Lowe, Stephen Lipson, Trevor Horn	B-side of "Left to My Own Devices". Also on Introspective: Further Listening 1988–1989.
"Suburbia"	1986	Please	Tennant, Lowe	Fourth single from the album. Remixed for Disco.
"The Survivors"	1996	Bilingual	Tennant, Lowe	
"Tall Thin Men"	2017	Nightlife: Further Listening 1996–2000	Tennant, Lowe	Demo of a song originally intended but not used for the musical Closer to Heaven.
"That's My Impression"	1986	Alternative	Tennant, Lowe	B-side of "Love Comes Quickly." Also on Please: Further Listening 1984–1986.
"The Theatre"	1993	Very	Tennant, Lowe	
"This Must Be the Place I Waited Years to Leave"	1990	Behaviour	Tennant, Lowe	
"This Used to Be the Future"	2009	Yes: Etc.	Tennant, Lowe	On the limited 2-disc edition of Yes and on Yes: Further Listening 2008-2010. Features Philip Oakey on vocals.
"Through You"	2024		Tennant, Lowe	Bonus track on the single "Loneliness" from Nonetheless.
"Thursday"	2013	Electric	Tennant, Lowe, Elliot Gleave	Featuring Example. Fourth single from the album.
"Time on My Hands"	2003	Disco 3	Tennant, Lowe	Also on Release: Further Listening 2001–2004.
"To Face the Truth"	1990	Behaviour	Tennant, Lowe	
"To Speak Is a Sin"	1993	Very	Tennant, Lowe	
"To Step Aside"	1996	Bilingual	Tennant, Lowe	
"Together"	2010	Ultimate	Tennant, Lowe, Powell	Single written for the compilation album Ultimate. Also on Yes: Further Listening 2008–2010.
"Tonight Is Forever"	1986	Please	Tennant, Lowe	
"Too Many People"	1993	Alternative	Tennant, Lowe	B-side of "I Wouldn't Normally Do This Kind of Thing." Also on Very: Further Listening 1992–1994.
"A Top Secret Washing Machine"	2026		Tennant, Lowe	Released on Youtube on 18 September 2026.
"Transfer"	2007	Fundamental: Further Listening 2005–2007	Tennant, Lowe	Originally appeared on a limited edition vinyl record for Visionaire.
"Transparent"	2003	Release: Further Listening 2001–2004	Tennant, Lowe	Bonus track on the single "Miracles."
"The Truck Driver and His Mate"	1996	Bilingual: Further Listening 1995–1997	Tennant, Lowe	Bonus track on CD1 single "Before."
"Try It (I'm in Love with a Married Man)"	2003	Disco 3	Bobby Orlando	Also on Release: Further Listening 2001-2004.
"Twentieth Century"	2006	Fundamental	Tennant, Lowe	
"Twenty-something"	2016	Super	Tennant, Lowe	Second single from the album.
"Two Divided by Zero"	1986	Please	Tennant, Orlando	
"Undertow"	2016	Super	Tennant, Lowe	Fifth single from the album.
"Up Against It"	1996	Bilingual	Tennant, Lowe	
"Up and Down"	2009	Yes: Further Listening 2008–2010	Tennant, Lowe	Bonus track on the single "Did You See Me Coming?"
"Vampires"	1999	Nightlife	Tennant, Lowe	
"The View from Your Balcony"	1997	Bilingual: Further Listening 1995–1997	Tennant, Lowe	Bonus track on CD1 single "Somewhere."
"Violence"	1986	Please	Tennant, Lowe	
"Viva la Vida/Domino Dancing"	2009	Christmas (EP)	Coldplay (first song); Tennant, Lowe (second song)	Also on Yes: Further Listening 2008–2010.
"Vocal"	2013	Electric	Tennant, Lowe	Second single from the album.
"Vulnerable"	2009	Yes	Tennant, Lowe	
"Was It Worth It?"	1991	Discography: The Complete Singles Collection	Tennant, Lowe	Also on Behaviour: Further Listening 1990–1991.
"Was That What It Was?"	1986	Alternative	Tennant, Lowe	B-side of the 1986 single "Opportunities (Let's Make Lots of Money)." Also on Please: Further Listening 1984–1986.
"Water"	2017	Fundamental: Further Listening 2005–2007	Tennant, Lowe	20-second ringtone.
"The Way It Used to Be"	2009	Yes	Tennant, Lowe, Cooper, Higgins, Nick Coler	
"The Way Through the Woods"	2012	Elysium: Further Listening 2011–2012	Tennant, Lowe (music); Rudyard Kipling (words)	Bonus track on the single "Winner". Shorter version is on the Japanese edition of Elysium.
"We All Feel Better in the Dark"	1990	Alternative	Tennant, Lowe	B-side of "Being Boring." Extended mix is on Behaviour: Further Listening 1990–1991.
"We Came from Outer Space"	1993	Very Relentless	Tennant, Lowe	Appears on bonus disc Relentless.
"Wedding in Berlin"	2020	Hotspot	Tennant, Lowe	
"We're All Criminals Now"	2009	Yes: Further Listening 2008–2010	Tennant, Lowe	Bonus track on the single "Love Etc."
"We're the Pet Shop Boys"	2003	Release: Further Listening 2001–2004	My Robot Friend	Bonus track on the CD single "Miracles."
"West End Girls"	1984	Please	Tennant, Lowe	Original version recorded with Bobby Orlando released as a single in 1984. Re-recorded with Stephen Hague and reissued as a single in 1985 and on the album Please in 1986.
"What Are We Going to Do About the Rich?"	2019	Agenda (EP)	Tennant, Lowe	Released on CD with the 2019 edition of "Annually" and as a digital download.
"What Have I Done to Deserve This?"	1987	Actually	Tennant, Lowe, Allee Willis	Features Dusty Springfield on vocals. Second single from the album.
"What Keeps Mankind Alive?"	1988	Alternative	Bertolt Brecht, Kurt Weill	Recorded for a BBC Radio One programme on The Threepenny Opera. Bonus track on CD2 single "Can You Forgive Her?" Also on Introspective: Further Listening 1988–1989.
"Where Are You?"	2017	Fundamental: Further Listening 2005–2007	Tennant, Lowe	20-second ringtone.
"Where the Streets Have No Name (I Can't Take My Eyes Off You)"	1991	Discography: The Complete Singles Collection	U2 (first song); Bob Crewe, Bob Gaudio (second song)	Double A-side with "How Can You Expect to Be Taken Seriously" from Behaviour. Also on Behaviour: Further Listening 1990–1991.
"The White Dress"	2016		Tennant, Lowe	Bonus track on the single "Twenty-something" from Super.
"Why Am I Dancing?"	2024	Nonetheless	Tennant, Lowe	
"Why Don't We Live Together?"	1986	Please	Tennant, Lowe	
"Wiedersehen"	2016		Tennant, Lowe	Bonus track on the single "Twenty-something" from Super.
"Will-o-the-Wisp"	2020	Hotspot	Tennant, Lowe	
"Wings and Faith"	2017	Yes: Further Listening 2008–2010	Tennant, Lowe	Written for a children's play of My Dad's a Birdman.
"Winner"	2012	Elysium	Tennant, Lowe	First single from the album.
"Yesterday, When I Was Mad"	1993	Very	Tennant, Lowe	Fifth single from the album.
"You Are The One"	2020	Hotspot	Tennant, Lowe	
"You Choose"	2002	Release	Tennant, Lowe	
"You Know Where You Went Wrong"	1987	Alternative	Tennant, Lowe	B-side of "It's a Sin." Also on Actually: Further Listening 1987-1988.
"You Only Tell Me You Love Me When You're Drunk"	1999	Nightlife	Tennant, Lowe	Third single from the album.
"Young Offender"	1993	Very	Tennant, Lowe	
"Your Early Stuff"	2012	Elysium	Tennant, Lowe	
"Your Funny Uncle"	1988	Alternative	Tennant, Lowe	B-side of "It's Alright." Also on Introspective: Further Listening 1988–1989.
