= Disco 3 =

Remix album by Pet Shop Boys
- Released: 3 February 2003
- Studio: Sony (London) (Note: Tracks 1 and 7; vocals on track 10); Chillout (Berlin) (Note: Tracks 2, 5 and 10); Hoedown City (London) (Note: Tracks 2 and 3; remix on track 6; engineering on track 8); Clashbackk/602 (Note: Track 4); Spacedust (Düsseldorf) (Note: Remix on track 9); Bob Music (Berlin) (Note: Track 10)
- Length: 51:54
- Label: Parlophone
- Producer: Pet Shop Boys; Chris Zippel

Pet Shop Boys chronology
Release (2002)	Disco 3 (2003)	PopArt: The Hits (2003)

Disco 3 is the third remix album by English synth-pop duo Pet Shop Boys, released on 3 February 2003 by Parlophone. The album consists of five remixes of songs and B-sides from their previous album, Release; three new tracks; a new recording of "Positive Role Model" from their 2001 musical Closer to Heaven; and a cover version of "Try It (I'm in Love with a Married Man)", originally by Oh Romeo, the band of former Pet Shop Boys producer Bobby Orlando. Disco 3 reached number one on Billboard magazine's Top Electronic Albums chart in the US.

== Background and compilation ==
Disco 3 was the third in a series of remix albums of that name. The duo originally chose the title London/Berlin for the album, but cover photographer Wolfgang Tillmans suggested they use the Disco name to make the theme clear.

The dance-focused remix album followed within a year of the downbeat, guitar-driven Release (2002), which had received a muted response from some critics and fans; Neil Tennant called the decision "damage limitation mode". Several of the songs appearing on Disco 3 had been written in the three-year period leading up to Release, including the album tracks "London", "Here", and "Home and Dry", along with its B-side, "Sexy Northerner", and the outtake "Time on My Hands". "Somebody Else's Business" and "Positive Role Model" were recorded in Berlin in March 2000 at the same time as "London"; "Positive Role Model" also appeared as a B-side on the Germany-only single of "London" in 2002. The cover "Try It (I'm in Love with a Married Man)" and Pet Shop Boys' own "If Looks Could Kill" both originated in 1983 and had been debuted by the duo during a 2002 Peel Session.

== Release ==
Disco 3 was released by Parlophone on LP, cassette, and CD on 3 February 2003. It debuted at number 36 on the UK Albums Chart and at number two on the UK Dance Albums chart.

In the United States, the album came out the next day, 4 February, on the Sanctuary Records label. It entered the Billboard 200 at 188, and it topped the magazine's Electronic Albums chart. As of May 2006, the album had sold 42,000 copies in the United States.

The album cover photo (pictured) was taken by Wolfgang Tillmans, depicting the London skyline at night.

== Critical reception ==
Professional ratings
Review scores
Source	Rating
AllMusic	3/5 stars
Drowned in Sound	8/10
NME	4.5/5 stars
PlayLouder	4/5 stars
Release Magazine	9/10

Niklas Forsberg of Release Magazine described Disco 3 as "One part remix album and one part kick-ass-new-dance tracks album ... a journey through realms of synthpop, techno and club ventures". Tim DiGravina of AllMusic observed: "Disco 3 isn't geared toward casual listeners or casual Pet Shop Boys fans, for that matter; these songs target nightclubs and perhaps listeners who crave high-tech musical sheen for speeding down European motorways. Par for the course on Disco 3 are punchy bass beats, snippets of Neil Tennant's vocals, standard but classy house effects, and massive dollops of New Order inspiration". Mark Reed of Drowned in Sound commented: "... from the glorious remixing of tracks from their latest album (the wry 'Release') and five new songs, 'Disco 3' is an album that, shorn of the very concept of hit-singles and of chart positions, just does a fine job of presenting what Kraftwerk called "the man machine" — the glorious place where soul meets steel, where circuits meet comfort, and where technology meets temptation. It shows that you can glean beauty from the beats, and presents the very best things about both the Pet Shop Boys and their genre".

Jane Stevenson of Jam! assessed the song selections: "Some are duds, like the plodding opener Time On My Hands, while others are revelations, such as the fun and frothy Positive Role Model — recorded in Berlin with producer/programmer Chris Zippel, who also handled another standout, Somebody Else's Business. Other highlights feature two of Release's best songs: Home And Dry, which is turned into a fast-paced disco number without sacrificing the song's lovely sentiment, and a stripped-down, slower-paced piano version of London". David Medsker of the Chicago-based music website PopMatters noted that the word "disco" had a negative connotation in the US, unlike the UK, where Pet Shop Boys epitomised "thinking man's disco". Describing the state of dance music at the time as "sterile" and "homogenized", Medsker observed, "It is therefore very telling that for Disco 3, the Pet Shop Boys chose to put more emphasis on new material than to remix the new standards". He characterised "Positive Role Model" as "a sunny raver" and "Time on My Hands" as "one of the friskiest songs the Boys have done in ages, an icy slice of robotic synth pop the likes of which Gary Numan can only dream of making anymore"; whereas Felix Da Housecat's remix of "London", while "quite good" as a dance cut, "has absolutely nothing to do with the original song".

Several reviewers compared Disco 3 to its predecessor, Release. Iain Moffat of Playlouder wrote: "Now this is more like it. Not that 'Release' wasn't a great album — au contraire, it actually housed some of the sweetest songs to ever come with a Tennant/Lowe credit — but, unusually, the fact that they were embracing their more, shall we say, organic side just as the rest of the world was toppling into ever more sparkling electronic frippery suggested that perhaps their eyes had left the ball somewhat. Well, so much for that. 'Disco 3', as well as being a useful companion piece to its two predecessors, is a shameless bid to not only make up lost ground but also show their spiritual offspring exactly how it's done…" Writing for NME, Peter Robinson called it "the duo's best album in ten years", adding: "If 'Release' was guitars 'n' woolly jumpers, 'Disco 3' is about getting back to core values of warm synth manoeuvres and frequent, overriding lyrical gloom".

== Track listing ==
No.	Title	Writer(s)	Producer(s)	Length
1.	"Time on My Hands"	Neil Tennant; Chris Lowe	Pet Shop Boys	3:53
2.	"Positive Role Model"	Tennant; Lowe; Barry White; Anthony Sepe; Peter Sterling Radcliffe	Pet Shop Boys; Chris Zippel	4:02
3.	"Try It (I'm in Love with a Married Man)"	Bobby Orlando	Pet Shop Boys	4:47
4.	"London" (Thee Radikal Blaklite edit)	Tennant; Lowe; Zippel	Felix da Housecat^{[a]}; Zippel^{[b]}	5:44
5.	"Somebody Else's Business"	Tennant; Lowe	Zippel; Pet Shop Boys	3:28
6.	"Here" (PSB new extended mix)	Tennant; Lowe	Pet Shop Boys^{[c]}	6:13
7.	"If Looks Could Kill"	Tennant; Lowe	Pet Shop Boys	4:11
8.	"Sexy Northerner" (Superchumbo mix)	Tennant; Lowe	Tom Stephan^{[a]}; Pet Shop Boys^{[b]}	8:36
9.	"Home and Dry" (Blank & Jones remix)	Tennant; Lowe	Piet Blank^{[a]}; Jaspa Jones^{[a]}; Andy Kaufhold^{[a]}; Pet Shop Boys^{[b]}	6:36
10.	"London" (Genuine Piano mix)	Tennant; Lowe; Zippel	Zippel	4:16

=== Notes ===
- ^{^[a]} signifies a remixer and additional producer
- ^{^[b]} signifies an original producer
- ^{^[c]} signifies a main producer and remixer

=== Sample credits ===
- "Positive Role Model" includes a sample of "You're the First, the Last, My Everything" by Barry White.

== Personnel ==
Credits adapted from the liner notes of Disco 3.

=== Pet Shop Boys ===
- Neil Tennant
- Chris Lowe

=== Additional musicians ===
- Pete Gleadall – programming (tracks 1–3, 5–7, 9)
- Chris Zippel – programming (tracks 2, 5); additional keyboards (track 2)
- Christian Hayes – guitars (track 7)
- Mark Refoy – guitars (track 7)
- Robert Matt – Steinway piano (track 10)

=== Technical ===
- Pet Shop Boys – production (tracks 1–3, 5–7); remix (track 6); original production (tracks 8, 9)
- Bob Kraushaar – mixing, engineering (tracks 1, 7)
- Pete Gleadall – engineering (tracks 1, 3, 6, 8, 9); mixing (tracks 3, 4); vocal recording (track 10)
- Chris Zippel – production, engineering (tracks 2, 5, 10); original production, original engineering (track 4); mixing (tracks 5, 10)
- Florian Richter – mixing (track 2)
- Kai Diener – mixing (track 2)
- Felix da Housecat – remix, additional production (track 4)
- Tom Stephan – remix, additional production (track 8)
- Piet Blank – remix, additional production (track 9)
- Jaspa Jones – remix, additional production (track 9)
- Andy Kaufhold – remix, additional production (track 9)

=== Artwork ===
- Scott King – sleeve art direction, design
- Wolfgang Tillmans – photography

== Charts ==
Chart performance for Disco 3
Chart (2003)	Peak position
Australian Albums (ARIA)	153
Australian Dance Albums (ARIA)	17
Danish Albums (Hitlisten)	24
European Albums (Music & Media)	59
German Albums (Offizielle Top 100)	33
Japanese Albums (Oricon)	196
Scottish Albums (OCC)	57
Swedish Albums (Sverigetopplistan)	43
UK Albums (OCC)	36
US Billboard 200	188
US Top Dance Albums (Billboard)	1
