= London (Pet Shop Boys song) =

- CD2 single cover

Single by Pet Shop Boys

from the album Release
- B-side: "Positive Role Model"
- Released: 14 October 2002
- Recorded: March 2000
- Studio: Studio Chillout (Berlin)
- Genre: Synth-pop
- Length: 3:52
- Label: Parlophone
- Songwriter(s): Neil Tennant; Chris Lowe; Chris Zippel
- Producer(s): Chris Zippel

Pet Shop Boys singles chronology
"I Get Along" (2002)	"London" (2002)	"Miracles" (2003)

Music video
- "London" on YouTube

"London" is a song by English synth-pop duo Pet Shop Boys, released on 14 October 2002 as the third and final single from their eighth studio album, Release (2002). It was released exclusively in Germany and Europe and as a promotional-only release in the United Kingdom.

== Background and composition ==
"London" was written in 2000. Neil Tennant wrote the chorus first on piano. He and Chris Lowe went to Berlin in March 2000 to record "Positive Role Model" and "Somebody Else's Business" with producer Chris Zippel. Zippel had written a piece of music that became the verse of "London". The lyrics are about two young Russian men coming to London looking for work. The narrator's father was killed in the Soviet–Afghan War. Tennant described "London" as a pro-immigration song.

"Positive Role Model" became the B-side to the single and was later included on the duo's remix album Disco 3 (2003).

== Artwork ==
The single cover features a pigeon, as a reference to the city of London itself. The CD1 single has Pet Shop Boys in pink text and the CD2 single has green text, using the same typography as "Home and Dry" (2002). It was designed by Scott King, with photography by Jonathan de Villiers.

== Music video ==
The music video for "London" was directed by Martin Parr, in the style of his observational photography. It features two young Russian men, as described in the song, wandering in the city of London. Tennant and Lowe are also seen busking on the streets and in the Underground. One of the men is played by Alexei Akinfiev.

== Live performances ==
"London" was performed during the Release Tour in 2002.

== Track listings ==
All tracks written by Tennant, Lowe, and Zippel, except where noted.

- German CD maxi single 1
1. "London" (Berlin radio mix) – 3:52 (mixed by Chris Zippel and Kai Diener)
2. "Positive Role Model" (Note: Contains a sample from "You're the First, the Last, My Everything" by Barry White) – 4:05 (Tennant, Lowe, Barry White, Peter Radcliffe, Tony Sepe)
3. "London" (Genuine Piano mix) – 4:16 (mixed by Chris Zippel)
- German CD maxi single 2
1. "London" (Westbam In Berlin mix) – 5:43 (remixed by Klaus Jankuhn and Westbam)
2. "London" (Thee Radikal Blaklite mix) – 8:31 (remixed by Felix da Housecat)
3. "London" (Thee Radikal dub) – 8:17 (remixed by Felix da Housecat)
- UK promotional CD single
1. "London" (Berlin radio mix) – 3:52 (mixed by Chris Zippel and Kai Diener)
2. "London" (Genuine Piano mix) – 4:16 (mixed by Chris Zippel)
- German promotional 12-inch single
1. "London" (Westbam In Berlin mix) – 5:43 (remixed by Klaus Jankuhn and Westbam)
2. "London" (Thee Radikal Blaklite mix) – 8:31 (remixed by Felix da Housecat)

== Personnel ==
Pet Shop Boys

- Chris Lowe
- Neil Tennant

Additional musicians

- "Little Mike" – guitars, bass
- Chris Zippel – keyboards

Technical personnel

- Chris Zippel – production, engineering
- Michael Brauer – mixing
- Rick Chavarria – mix assistant
- Kai Diener – premix
- Florian Richter – premix

Artwork

- Scott King – design
- Jonathan de Villiers – photography

== Charts ==
Chart performance for "London"
Chart (2002)	Peak position
Denmark (Tracklisten)	14
Germany (GfK)	39
Hungary (Single Top 40)	19
Spain (PROMUSICAE)	8
UK Singles (OCC)	118
