= I Get Along (Pet Shop Boys song) =

2002 single by Pet Shop Boys

Single by Pet Shop Boys

from the album Release
- B-side: "Searching for the Face of Jesus"; "Between Two Islands"; "Friendly Fire"
- Released: 15 July 2002
- Studio: Studio PSB (Durham, UK); Sony Music (London)
- Genre: Pop
- Length: 5:50 (album full version); 4:11 (radio edit)
- Label: Parlophone
- Songwriters: Neil Tennant; Chris Lowe
- Producer: Pet Shop Boys

Pet Shop Boys singles chronology
"Home and Dry" (2002)	"I Get Along" (2002)	"London" (2002)

Music video
- "I Get Along" on YouTube

"I Get Along" is a song by English synth-pop duo Pet Shop Boys, released on 15 July 2002 as the second single from their eighth studio album, Release (2002). It peaked at number 18 on the UK Singles Chart.

== Background and composition ==
Written as a love song, Neil Tennant has stated that "I Get Along" is also a commentary on the then fraught relationship between British prime minister Tony Blair and New Labour architect Peter Mandelson after the latter had to resign again from the British Cabinet when he was involved in a second major scandal. It is the first in a trilogy of songs about Blair, followed by "I'm with Stupid" (2006) and "Legacy" (2009). The phrase "rock royalty" was inspired by t-shirts worn by Stella McCartney and Liv Tyler at the 1999 Met Gala, and the line, "The big boys are back and we need them", came from an interview with Richard Ashcroft in NME.

The song, like its parent album, also stands in contrast to the Pet Shop Boys' predominantly electronic catalogue of songs. It opens with a piano and features a rock-style guitar, played by Johnny Marr, with percussion by Jody Linscott and bass guitar by Steve Walters. There are only sparse actual synthesised sounds in the song.

Tennant described the song as having "Britpop overtones". He called it "our Oasis song" and also compared it to The Beatles. Chris Lowe wrote the chorus in the style of a 1970s terrace anthem.

== Release ==
The UK single releases followed the pattern set by "Home and Dry" previously, with two CD singles and a DVD single. The CD1 single was an enhanced CD and included the music video for the song. CD2 had a live version of "I Get Along" and two other songs from the Release Tour. The DVD had the extended video of "I Get Along" and "E-mail".

The radio edit of "I Get Along" omits the third verse of the song, which partially reprises the first verse. "I Get Along" has no remixes, and a promotional 12-inch single was not released. In the Pet Shop Boys' fanclub magazine, it was said that David Bowie and Marilyn Manson were both approached to do remixes, but there was not enough time for them to be done.

In 2012, the Pet Shop Boys wrote the song "Listening" on Norwegian pop singer Morten Harket's solo album Out of My Hands. The song reuses certain elements of the melody and the outro of "I Get Along".

=== Artwork ===
The cover of each single displays a pie chart, labeled "Fig. 01", "Fig. 02", and "Fig. 03" respectively. As a non-sequitur, the sectors of the charts are captioned with the personal thoughts of one or more unidentified people. They were designed by Scott King, based on his work, Self-Portrait as a Catholic Pie Chart (4 Parts) (2002).

=== Promotion ===
"I Get Along" was A-listed to the primary BBC Radio 2 playlist. In April 2002, a special edition of Top of the Pops was dedicated to Pet Shop Boys, airing performances from "West End Girls" (1986) to "I Get Along", and featuring commentary with the duo.

== Music video ==
The music video was directed by Bruce Weber, who had worked with the band before, most notably on the video for the 1990 single "Being Boring". It does not draw on the song's political subtext, instead portraying a photoshoot of young models, including Natalia Vodianova, in a New York City artist's studio. Tennant and Lowe are shown taking photos with Polaroid cameras, and an artist's portrait of the duo is displayed. The recent events of September 11, 2001 were alluded to with a view out the window to where the World Trade Center had stood and a cardboard building representing the Twin Towers falling over in the studio.

The video opens with a quote from "Youth" (1898) by Joseph Conrad: "Only a moment; a moment of strength, of romance, of glamour—of youth... A flick of sunshine upon a strange shore, the time to remember, the time for a sigh, and—good-bye!" It ends with a 1942 quote from Zelda Fitzgerald, "Nobody has ever measured, even poets, how much a heart can hold", and then segues into a short video for another album track, "E-mail", also directed by Weber.

== Critical reception ==
Music Week called "I Get Along", "a great song, containing all the downbeat lyricism and pop nous expected from a Pet Shop Boys single". A review in The Guardian noted the song's "magnificent terrace-chant chorus".

== Live performances ==
"I Get Along" was performed on the University Tour portion of the Release Tour in 2002, with Tennant on acoustic guitar. It was also one of the songs from Release performed by Pet Shop Boys that year at Roskilde, where the set list was mainly their hits. Lowe noted, "When you're performing at a festival, it's important to play songs that people know. It's not the place to present the weird songs from the new album".

== Track listings ==
All tracks written by Tennant, Lowe unless noted.

- UK CD single 1 (CDRS 6581)
1. "I Get Along" (radio edit)
2. "Searching for the Face of Jesus"
3. "Between Two Islands" (Note: Contains an excerpt from the Marvin Gaye song "I Want You" by Leon Ware and Arthur "T-Boy" Ross) (Tennant, Lowe, Ware, Ross)
4. "I Get Along" (music video)
- UK CD single 2 (CDR 6581)
1. "I Get Along" (live)
2. "A Red Letter Day" (live)
3. "Love Comes Quickly" (live) (Tennant, Lowe, Hague)
- UK DVD single (DVDR 6581)
1. "I Get Along/E-Mail" (music video)
2. "Friendly Fire"
3. "Home and Dry" (Blank & Jones vocal)

== Personnel ==
Credits adapted from the liner notes of Release: Further Listening 2001–2004 and "I Get Along".

Pet Shop Boys

- Chris Lowe
- Neil Tennant

Additional musicians

- Johnny Marr – guitars
- Steve Walters – bass guitar
- Jody Linscott – percussion

Technical personnel

- Pet Shop Boys – production
- Pete Gleadall – engineering, programming
- Michael Brauer – mixing
- Rick Chavarria – mixing assistant

Artwork

- Scott King – sleeve image, words, design

== Charts ==
Chart performance for "I Get Along"
Chart (2002)	Peak position
Canada (Nielsen SoundScan)	25
Denmark (Tracklisten)	9
Europe (Eurochart Hot 100 Singles)	41
Germany (GfK)	31
Hungary (Single Top 40)	20
Italy (FIMI)	35
Netherlands (Single Top 100)	81
Romania (Romanian Top 100)	62
Scotland Singles (OCC)	24
UK Singles (OCC)	18
