= Release (Pet Shop Boys album) =

Studio album by Pet Shop Boys
- Released: 1 April 2002
- Recorded: September 2000 – November 2001
- Studio: Studio PSB (Durham); Sony Music (London) (Note: Additional recording); Chillout (Berlin) (Note: "London")
- Genre: Pop
- Length: 44:53
- Label: Parlophone/EMI
- Producer: Pet Shop Boys; Chris Zippel

Pet Shop Boys chronology
Nightlife (1999)	Release (2002)	Disco 3 (2003)

Singles from Release
- 1. "Home and Dry" Released: 18 March 2002; 2. "I Get Along" Released: 15 July 2002; 3. "London" Released: 14 October 2002

Release is the eighth studio album by English synth-pop duo Pet Shop Boys, released on 1 April 2002 by Parlophone/EMI. It was recorded between 2000 and 2001, primarily written and produced by the duo, with the exception of the song "London", which was co-written and produced by Chris Zippel. The album produced three singles: "Home and Dry", "I Get Along", and "London", the latter of which was only released in continental Europe. Release reached number seven on the UK Albums Chart and number three in Germany, and it received mixed-to-positive reviews from critics.

== Background and recording ==
After their previous studio album, Nightlife (1999), Pet Shop Boys originally planned to release a greatest hits collection in the autumn of 2000 with two new tracks, "Positive Role Model" and "Somebody Else's Business". "London" was also recorded at this time, with producer Chris Zippel in Berlin in March 2000. Over the summer, they decided to produce a full-length studio album instead.

Work on the album began in September 2000 at Neil Tennant's home studio in County Durham. Most of the album was recorded there over the next year. Chris Lowe commented that the album reflects the North East of England:

I don't think we'd have made this album in London. We were very remote — it's on the edge of the moors, the weather's more extreme, you're more isolated and you're contemplative. I think that all comes across in the music.

The album marked a significant departure from their previous work, being guitar-driven rather than dance-oriented, at Lowe's suggestion. However, Release was made like their previous albums, with most tracks mainly programmed on computers, using sampled or synthesised guitars and drum sounds chosen to sound realistic. On "Love Is a Catastrophe", for instance, the part that sounds like a guitar solo was played on a keyboard, while ex-Smiths guitarist Johnny Marr played along with a keyboard arpeggio.

Marr was brought in to play electric and acoustic guitar on seven of the album's ten tracks later on in the sessions, both in Durham and at Sony Music Studios in London, where additional recording was done in September and October 2001. Two session musicians were also brought in, percussionist Jody Linscott and bass guitarist Steve Walters. Pet Shop Boys decided not to use an outside producer. They commissioned Michael Brauer to mix the album at Olympic Studios in London from October to November 2001.

The original version of the album had eleven tracks, but "I Didn't Get Where I Am Today" was removed from the album before release and later became a bonus track on the 2004 single "Flamboyant". Other tracks recorded during the sessions for the album which ended up as B-sides are "Between Two Islands", "Searching for the Face of Jesus", "Sexy Northerner", and "Always".

Partly in response to the modest commercial success of this album, and partly because of the habit of distancing themselves musically from their most recent work, Pet Shop Boys returned to their dance roots one year later with Disco 3 (2003), which included remixes of some of the songs from Release along with material that they had worked on at the same time, such as "Time on My Hands", "Positive Role Model", and "Somebody Else's Business".

== Release ==
The album title was suggested by Wolfgang Tillmans, director of the "Home and Dry" video, in place of the duo's initial thought to name it Home as a contrast to Nightlife. Release refers to both a record release and an emotional release.

Release came out in the UK on 1 April 2002, selling 18,000 copies its first week. Debuting at number seven, it was the duo's tenth consecutive Top 10 album. Release entered the European Top 100 Albums chart at number five, reaching the Top 10 in Germany at number three and Denmark at number nine.

In the United States, the album was released by Sanctuary Records on 23 April 2002. It opened at number one on Billboard magazine's Top Electronic Albums chart, and it peaked at number 73 on the Billboard 200 as the duo's twelfth chart entry in a span of nearly 16 years. It also reached number nine on their Internet Album Sales chart. As of 2006, Release had sold 73,000 copies in the US.

In 2017, the album was reissued as Release: Further Listening 2001–2004. The new version was digitally remastered and came with two bonus discs of B-sides and previously unreleased material from around the time of the album's original release. Release re-entered the UK Albums Chart at number 30 in August 2017 following the reissue. In the US, Release: Further Listening placed at number 15 on the Billboard Top Dance/Electronic Albums chart and reentered the Internet Albums chart at number 19, selling around 2,000 copies the week of its release, with half of those purchased online.

=== Artwork ===
On its first release, a limited run of CDs in foil-effect, debossed slipcases were available in a choice of four colours, each featuring a different flower in the style of an old botanical print: grey poppy, turquoise daisy, pink rose, and red iris. The vinyl LP came with the grey cover and a full-colour version on the inner sleeve, and the Japanese CD had the full-colour poppy as its cover. The limited edition CD was also released in the US, with a bonus disc including remixes and new tracks. The artwork was designed by Greg Foley of the New York design group and magazine publisher Visionaire and was nominated for a Grammy Award for Best Recording Package.

== Music videos ==
The directors for all three music videos for the album's singles are photographers by trade: Wolfgang Tillmans directed "Home and Dry", Bruce Weber directed "I Get Along" (following his previous work on the "Being Boring" and "Se a vida é" videos), and Martin Parr directed "London". The "Home and Dry" video consisted almost entirely of footage of mice filmed at Tottenham Court Road station in the London Underground and was deemed unplayable by MTV and other music video channels, although it was given high rotation on VIVA Plus in Germany. The video was considered by some to have significantly undermined the commercial potential of the lead single.

== Critical reception ==
Professional ratings
Aggregate scores
Source	Rating
Metacritic	77/100
Review scores
Source	Rating
AllMusic	4/5 stars
Robert Christgau	B+
Drowned in Sound	6/10
Hour	3.5/5
NME	4/10
Now	2/5 stars
Playlouder	4/5
Rolling Stone	3.5/5 stars

Release received generally favourable reviews according to Metacritic, which gave it a weighted average score of 77 out of 100 based on 13 reviews.

Music Week named it their "Album of the Week", stating: "This seventh studio album from Pet Shop Boys sees a dramatic change in style without compromising their much-loved signature sound". Michael Paoletta of Billboard called the album, "a career highpoint" that "couldn't be more lovely if it tried".

Dennis Lim of The Village Voice observed, "Release sounds at once like a last gasp and a reinvention, which makes it all the more moving". Paul Schrodt of Slant Magazine wrote: "with all due respect to the Boys's fabulous '80s output, it's Release that deserves the most attention, because it's both their most underrated masterpiece and an unflinching evocation of post-9/11 heartache". Keith Phipps of The A.V. Club felt, "the album features some of Tennant and Chris Lowe's subtlest, most affecting work, detailing a culture in which the gulf between people, whether heartbroken lovers or the ... immigrants of "London," can deepen even as their world shrinks".

Peter Robinson of NME called Release "their worst album to date". The BBC Music review by Jacqueline Hodges noted: "With an established career spanning so long, taking such a change of direction and become an ageing rock band is bound to be a gamble but this is one that failed to pay off". Graham Reed of Drowned in Sound rated it 6 out of 10, concluding: "Ultimately, 'Release' is the most disappointing Pet Shop Boys album in a long long time, and is their least consistent, least rewarding album yet; a badly judged commercial and artistic step sideways, if not backwards".

== Concert tour ==
Release was supported by the University Tour and the Release Tour in 2002. Pet Shop Boys previewed the album with a short tour of British universities from 8–13 February, visiting the University of Bristol, Keele University, the University of East Anglia, Teesside University, and De Montfort University, followed by a headline appearance at a show celebrating the 50th anniversary of NME at the London Astoria on Valentine's Day and a concert in Cologne, Germany, on 16 February.

Pet Shop Boys played two concerts for broadcast: one for BBC Radio 2 that aired on 6 April during the week of the album's release, and another at Gruenspan in Hamburg, Germany, shown on the Arte television channel on 7 May. The Release Tour ran from 14 May to 2 August. It started in Miami and covered North America and Europe, with additional dates in the UK, and ended in Asia.

The University Tour was inspired by the 1972 Wings University Tour by Paul McCartney and Wings. The intimate venues were a change from the arenas on the previous Nightlife Tour (1999–2000). The performers were in close proximity to the audience, and backlighting allowed them to see the crowd. Carl Burnett, who later worked on the Fundamental Tour (2006–07), designed the lighting and the set, which featured horizontal blinds as a backdrop.

The performances were lowkey in contrast to the duo's usual elaborate stage productions. Tennant commented: "We've always presented ourselves within a visual context on stage, which has been what we've become well-known for, and all of a sudden we thought it would be quite interesting to present ourselves as musicians". Additional musicians came on tour, including guitarists Bic Hayes and Mark Refoy. Tennant also played acoustic guitar, while Lowe played live keyboards. Jody Linscott, who played percussion on the album, was on the University Tour, while Dawne Adams was percussionist on the Release Tour. Pet Shop Boys programmer Pete Gleadall was also part of the ensemble.

The set list featured a number of songs from Release: the three singles—"Home and Dry", "I Get Along", and "London"—as well as "Birthday Boy", "Love Is a Catastrophe", "You Choose", and B-side "Sexy Northerner". They also played a range of hits like "West End Girls" (1985), "Love Comes Quickly" (1986), "Always On My Mind" (1987), "Being Boring" (1990), "Go West" (1993), "A Red Letter Day" (1996), "New York City Boy" (1999), and "You Only Tell Me You Love Me When You're Drunk" (1999). Occasional cover versions included "Do Anything You Wanna Do" (1977) by Eddie and the Hot Rods and "Philadelphia" (1994) by Neil Young.

As with the album, the new direction of the Pet Shop Boys' performance met with mixed reviews. Dorian Lynskey of The Guardian observed: "The only reason this incarnation doesn't qualify as back to basics is because they have never actually tried the basics before, and it is perhaps their boldest move yet". Gavin Martin of The Independent commented: "Previous live shows were costume-changing carnivals, alive with mischief and tongue-in-cheek theatrics; the present spectacle is an altogether more sombre and mature affair". Samuel Baker of Houston Music Review noticed a number of fans leaving early: "It was a shame to see the audience unwilling to accept the duo's venture into a more creative and artistic realm, but sometimes you cannot push your audience too far without receiving a backlash". Ernesto Lechner of Variety felt, "The new songs proved that, if anything, the duo's ability to use the genre's conventions to their advantage has only increased with time".

== Track listing ==
All tracks are written by Neil Tennant and Chris Lowe, except where noted. All tracks are produced by Pet Shop Boys, except where noted.

No.	Title	Writer(s)	Producer(s)	Length
1.	"Home and Dry"			4:21
2.	"I Get Along"			5:49
3.	"Birthday Boy"			6:26
4.	"London"	Tennant; Lowe; Chris Zippel	Zippel	3:46
5.	"E-Mail"			3:55
6.	"The Samurai in Autumn"			4:17
7.	"Love Is a Catastrophe"			4:50
8.	"Here"			3:15
9.	"The Night I Fell in Love"			5:04
10.	"You Choose"			3:10

US limited edition bonus disc
No.	Title	Writer(s)	Producer(s)	Length
1.	"Home and Dry" (ambient mix)			5:29
2.	"Sexy Northerner"			3:40
3.	"Always"			5:06
4.	"Closer to Heaven" (slow version)			6:30
5.	"Nightlife"		Pet Shop Boys; David Morales	3:56
6.	"Friendly Fire"		Pet Shop Boys; Craig Armstrong	3:26
7.	"Break 4 Love" (US Radio Edit) (Pet Shop Boys + Peter Rauhofer = The Collaboration)	Vaughan Mason	Rauhofer	3:28
8.	"Home and Dry" (Blank & Jones mix)		Pet Shop Boys; Piet Blank^{[a]}^{[b]}; Jaspa Jones^{[a]}^{[b]}	6:38
9.	"Home and Dry" (music video)

Further Listening 2001–2004 (disc two)
No.	Title	Writer(s)	Producer(s)	Length
1.	"Between Two Islands"	Tennant; Lowe; Leon Ware; T-Boy Ross		5:10
2.	"Searching for the Face of Jesus"			3:25
3.	"Time on My Hands"			3:52
4.	"Motoring" (demo)			4:02
5.	"Love Life"			3:44
6.	"Transparent"			3:51
7.	"Sexy Northerner"			3:39
8.	"The Night Is a Time to Explore Who You Are" (demo)			3:52
9.	"Closer to Heaven" (slow version)			6:27
10.	"Run, Girl, Run" (demo)			3:48
11.	"I Didn't Get Where I Am Today"	Tennant; Lowe; Dave Lambert		3:37
12.	"Always"			5:02
13.	"Home and Dry" (ambient mix)			5:29
14.	"Bright Young Things" (demo)			4:26
15.	"Kazak" (demo)			2:48
16.	"A Powerful Friend" (John Peel version)		Miti Adhikari	3:16
17.	"If Looks Could Kill" (John Peel version)		Adhikari	4:24
Total length:				71:15

Further Listening 2001–2004 (disc three)
No.	Title	Writer(s)	Producer(s)	Length
1.	"Try It (I'm in Love with a Married Man)"	Bobby Orlando		4:04
2.	"Here" (PSB New Extended Mix)			6:17
3.	"If Looks Could Kill"			4:10
4.	"A Powerful Friend"			3:22
5.	"Party Song"			3:40
6.	"No Excuse" (demo)			3:34
7.	"Blue on Blue"			3:10
8.	"Jack and Jill Party" (demo)			3:42
9.	"Baby" (demo)			3:43
10.	"Flamboyant" (original demo)			4:23
11.	"Miracles"	Adam F; Tennant; Lowe; Dan Fresh Stein	Adam F; Dan Fresh Stein; Stuart Crichton^{[b]}	3:55
12.	"Flamboyant" (7″ mix)		Pet Shop Boys; Tomcraft; Felix J. Gauder; Crichton	3:37
13.	"Numb" (demo)	Diane Warren		3:38
14.	"In Private" (featuring Elton John)		Pet Shop Boys; Crichton	4:10
15.	"Alone Again, Naturally" (featuring Elton John)	Gilbert O'Sullivan	Stargate; Pet Shop Boys	3:24
16.	"Reunion" (electro mix)		Stargate; Pet Shop Boys	4:29
17.	"Bright Young Things"		Zippel; Pet Shop Boys	4:55
18.	"We're the Pet Shop Boys"	My Robot Friend	Zippel; Pet Shop Boys	4:55
19.	"It's a Sin" (Barfly version)			3:58
Total length:				77:06

=== Notes ===
- ^{^[a]} signifies a remixer
- ^{^[b]} signifies an additional producer

=== Sample credits ===
- "Birthday Boy" features a sample from the Choir of Clare College, Cambridge performing "In the Bleak Midwinter", written by Harold Darke and Christina Rossetti.
- "Between Two Islands" contains an excerpt of "I Want You", written by Leon Ware and T-Boy Ross.
- "I Didn't Get Where I Am Today" includes a sample from "Father's Name Is Dad", written by Dave Lambert and performed by Fire.

== Personnel ==
Credits adapted from the liner notes of Release.

=== Pet Shop Boys ===
- Neil Tennant – vocals, guitar, keyboards
- Chris Lowe – keyboards, drum programming

=== Additional musicians ===
- Pete Gleadall – programming (tracks 1–3, 5–10)
- Johnny Marr – guitars (tracks 1–3, 5, 7, 9, 10)
- Jody Linscott – percussion (tracks 1–3, 5, 7–10)
- Steve Walters – bass guitar (tracks 2, 3, 9)
- Chris Zippel – keyboards (track 4); spoken idea (track 5)
- "Little Mike" – guitar, bass (track 4)
- Richard Niles – string arrangement, string conducting (track 5)

=== Technical ===
- Pet Shop Boys – production (tracks 1–3, 5–10)
- Pete Gleadall – engineering (tracks 1–3, 5–10)
- Michael Brauer – mixing (Note: Mixed at Olympic Studios (London))
- Rick Chavarria – mix assistance
- Chris Zippel – production, engineering (track 4)
- Kai Diener – premix (track 4)
- Florian Richter – premix (track 4)
- Mike Ross – string recording (track 5)
- Andrew Nichols – recording assistance at Sony Music Studios
- Philippe Rose – mixing assistance
- Greg Calbi – mastering (Note: Mastered at Sterling Sound (New York City))
- Steve Fallone – mastering assistance
- Tim Young – 2017 remastering

=== Artwork ===
- Dan Forbes – photography
- Pennie Smith – portrait
- Greg Foley – art direction
- Jake McCabe – design production
- Tatiana Gaz – design associate

== Charts ==
=== Weekly charts ===
Weekly chart performance for Release
Chart (2002)	Peak position
Australian Albums (ARIA)	62
Austrian Albums (Ö3 Austria)	15
Belgian Albums (Ultratop Wallonia)	21
Czech Albums (ČNS IFPI)	19
Danish Albums (Hitlisten)	9
Dutch Albums (Album Top 100)	71
European Albums (Music & Media)	5
Finnish Albums (Suomen virallinen lista)	22
French Albums (SNEP)	53
German Albums (Offizielle Top 100)	3
Hungarian Albums (MAHASZ)	29
Irish Albums (IRMA)	58
Italian Albums (FIMI)	27
Japanese Albums (Oricon)	26
Norwegian Albums (VG-lista)	33
Scottish Albums (OCC)	15
Spanish Albums (AFYVE)	16
Swedish Albums (Sverigetopplistan)	12
Swiss Albums (Schweizer Hitparade)	13
UK Albums (OCC)	7
US Billboard 200	73
US Top Dance Albums (Billboard)	1

Chart (2026)	Peak position
Croatian International Albums (HDU)	22

=== Year-end charts ===
Year-end chart performance for Release
Chart (2002)	Position
German Albums (Offizielle Top 100)	94

== Certifications and sales ==
Certifications and sales for Release
Region	Certification	Certified units/sales
United Kingdom (BPI)	Silver	60,000^{^}
United States	—	73,000
^{^} Shipments figures based on certification alone.
