= The Night I Fell in Love =

The Night I Fell in Love may refer to:

- The Night I Fell in Love (album), a 1985 album by Luther Vandross.
- "The Night I Fell in Love" (song), a 2002 song by the Pet Shop Boys.
