= Home and Dry =

2002 single by Pet Shop Boys

Single by Pet Shop Boys

from the album Release
- B-side: "Sexy Northerner"; "Always"; "Nightlife"
- Released: 18 March 2002
- Studio: Studio PSB (Durham, UK); Sony Music (London)
- Genre: Synth-pop
- Length: 4:21
- Label: Parlophone
- Songwriters: Neil Tennant; Chris Lowe
- Producer: Pet Shop Boys

Pet Shop Boys singles chronology
"Break 4 Love" (2001)	"Home and Dry" (2002)	"I Get Along" (2002)

Music video
- "Home and Dry" on YouTube

"Home and Dry" is a song by English synth-pop duo Pet Shop Boys, released on 18 March 2002 by Parlophone as the first single from their eighth studio album, Release (2002). It reached number 14 on the UK Singles Chart and number 44 on the US Hot Dance Club Play chart.

== Background and composition ==
The music, composed by Chris Lowe, is based around a single riff that carries through the verse, bridge, and chorus. Neil Tennant added four different vocal melodies; Auto-Tune was used on his voice in the bridge. Johnny Marr played a guitar solo on the track, and Jody Linscott added percussion. The line spoken by Lowe, "We're going home", is a reference to same words sung by Paul McCartney on the Beatles song "Two of Us" (1969).

The lyrics describe waiting anxiously for a loved one to return safely home from abroad. The line "those dark and frantic transatlantic miles" conveys a fear of flying and the lonely feeling of being in a plane over the ocean at night. The September 11 attacks occurred while they were working on the album, and although the lyrics had been written earlier, mix engineer Michael Brauer commented, "This song is about that now".

== Release ==
Three versions of the single were released, two on CD and one on DVD. A slipcase to hold all three was sent to the 32,000 people on the Pet Shop Boys mailing list as a promotion to encourage sales. CD1 included new B-sides "Sexy Northerner" and "Always". The lead track on CD2 was an ambient mix of "Home and Dry", and it also featured the previously released "Break 4 Love" (2001). The music video for the song was on the DVD, with another new B-side, "Nightlife", and an alternate mix of "Break 4 Love".

In the United States, "Home and Dry" was released by Sanctuary Records as a noncommercial single. The track was sent to Hot Adult Contemporary radio stations on 5 April 2002. A remix by German trance duo Blank & Jones was distributed to Club DJs on 12 April; it spent five weeks on Billboard's Hot Dance Club Play chart, peaking at 44 in July. The remix was included on a bonus disc with the US edition of Release, along with the ambient mix and the music video. AOL offered MP3 downloads of the song and streams of the video.

A remix of one of the B-sides, "Sexy Northerner", was included on Disco 3 and was released as a promotional single in the United States in 2003; it peaked at number 15 on the Dance Club Play chart.

=== Artwork ===
The single packaging was designed by Scott King. It features the name Pet Shop Boys in large letters on different coloured sleeves. CD1 (pictured) has a yellow background, CD2 is orange, and the DVD is red. The look was a departure from the small lettering commonly used on their covers.

== Music video ==
The unusual music video, directed by Wolfgang Tillmans, primarily consists of footage of mice running across tracks and eating discarded food at Tottenham Court Road Underground station. There are occasional shots of the duo performing the song in the empty nightclub, Heaven. The video was deemed unsuitable for broadcast by MTV. However, the German music television channel VIVA Plus played the video in heavy rotation in March 2002.

== Critical reception ==
Music Week called the single "fairly unexciting". Andy Thomas of Drowned in Sound rated it 7 out of 10, commenting: "Home and Dry features a dry drum rhythm, a drifting inoffensive vocal, and a radio friendly chorus. Just a shame they use a vocoda on the vocal, the effect being more dated than their trademark synths".

In an album review of Release, Dennis Lim of The Village Voice wrote: "The first song, "Home and Dry," instantly conjures an expectant mood, as Neil sings of waiting for a frequent-flyer boyfriend to return. The sentiments are benign, banal even ("So my baby's on the road"), but there's a trace of dread in his voice, underscored by the crystalline synth motif that repeats itself in a pitiless loop, as insistent as the arpeggios on "Every Breath You Take." You can practically see him fogging up the window pane".

== Live performances ==
"Home and Dry" was the show opener on the Release Tour in 2002. The song was performed on the Fundamental Tour (2006–07) with Tennant on acoustic guitar. The ambient version of "Home and Dry" was played on the Super Tour (2016–19).

== Track listings ==
- UK CD single 1
1. "Home and Dry"
2. "Sexy Northerner"
3. "Always"
- UK CD single 2
1. "Home and Dry" (Ambient Mix)
2. "Break 4 Love" (UK Radio edit)
3. "Break 4 Love" (Friburn & Urik Hi Pass Mix)
- UK DVD single
1. "Home and Dry" (video)
2. "Nightlife"
3. "Break 4 Love" (USA Club Mix)

== Personnel ==
Credits adapted from the liner notes of Release: Further Listening 2001–2004 and "Home and Dry".

Pet Shop Boys

- Chris Lowe
- Neil Tennant

Additional musicians

- Johnny Marr – guitars
- Jody Linscott – percussion

Technical personnel

- Pet Shop Boys – production
- Pete Gleadall – engineering, programming
- Michael Brauer – mixing
- Rick Chavarria – mixing assistant

Artwork

- Scott King – design
- Patrick Duffy – design assistant
- Wolfgang Tillmans – video stills

== Charts ==
=== Weekly charts ===
Weekly chart performance for "Home and Dry"
Chart (2002)	Peak position
Austria (Ö3 Austria Top 40)	47
Belgium (Ultratip Bubbling Under Flanders)	4
Belgium (Ultratip Bubbling Under Wallonia)	5
Canada (Nielsen SoundScan)	17
Denmark (Tracklisten)	4
Europe (Eurochart Hot 100 Singles)	18
Finland (Suomen virallinen lista)	13
France (SNEP)	96
Germany (GfK)	12
Ireland (IRMA)	33
Italy (FIMI)	9
Netherlands (Single Top 100)	51
Quebec (ADISQ)	50
Romania (Romanian Top 100)	8
Scottish Singles Sales (Official Charts)	14
Spain (Promusicae)	6
Sweden (Sverigetopplistan)	44
Switzerland (Schweizer Hitparade)	37
UK Singles (Official Charts)	14
US Dance Club Songs (Billboard) Blank & Jones remixes	44

=== Year-end charts ===
Year-end chart performance for "Home and Dry"
Chart (2002)	Position
Canada (Nielsen SoundScan)	152
Europe (European Radio Top 100)	29
