= Miracles (Pet Shop Boys song) =

Single by Pet Shop Boys

from the album PopArt: The Hits
- B-side: "We're the Pet Shop Boys"; "Transparent"
- Released: 17 November 2003
- Genre: Electro
- Length: 3:57
- Label: Parlophone
- Songwriter(s): Neil Tennant; Chris Lowe; Adam F; Dan Fresh Stein
- Producer(s): Adam F; Dan Fresh Stein; Stuart Crichton

Pet Shop Boys singles chronology
"London" (2002)	"Miracles" (2003)	"Flamboyant" (2004)

Music video
- "Miracles" on YouTube

"Miracles" is a song by English synth-pop duo Pet Shop Boys from their greatest hits album, PopArt: The Hits (2003). It was released on 17 November 2003 as the album's lead single. The song was co-written with drum and bass musicians Adam F and DJ Fresh. "Miracles" peaked at number 10 on the UK Singles Chart.

== Background and composition ==
Pet Shop Boys' concept for the song was to work with a hip-hop producer to combine electroclash with hip-hop beats. The duo were introduced to Adam F by their mutual manager, Merck Mercuriadis. Adam F and DJ Fresh had already written part of the song, which originally had a more drum and bass sound. Producer Stuart Crichton was brought in to do additional work on the track and gave it a four on the floor feel. Orchestration was arranged and conducted by Anne Dudley, with whom Pet Shop Boys had worked on Very (1993). The lyrics use nature as a conceit to convey the notion that a loved one makes the world seem miraculous. Neil Tennant was inspired by a book of Elizabethan metaphysical poetry.

== Release ==
"Miracles" achieved moderate airplay on the radio, with BBC Radio 2 accounting for the majority of its audience. The single debuted at number 10 in the UK, making it their 35th top 40 hit and their 19th to reach the top 10. It also topped the UK Dance Singles Chart.

Remixes were produced by Lemon Jelly and Eric Prydz. The B-side track "We're the Pet Shop Boys" is a cover of a 2002 song recorded by New York band My Robot Friend, in tribute to the Pet Shop Boys themselves; one part of the lyrics is an extended sequence of Pet Shop Boys song titles. It was covered again by Robbie Williams, with production by the Pet Shop Boys, on his 2006 album Rudebox.

=== Artwork ===
The 12-inch white vinyl had an elaborate design by Mark Farrow. The outer sleeve had die-cut silhouettes of Lowe and Tennant on either side, with a photo of cherry blossoms on the inner sleeve showing through. The floral design was also on the inside of both the inner and outer sleeves and on the label. The cherry blossoms were inspired by the nature imagery of the song. The CD1 single (pictured) featured Lowe's floral silhouette and came with a blue disc, and the CD2 single had Tennant and a pink disc. Promotional copies were scented with lavender, but EMI balked at the cost of using scent on the copies for sale.

== Music video ==
The music video was directed by Howard Greenhalgh. It primarily shows human figures interacting with cascades of water and milk, captured in intricate detail by the slow-motion footage. The buildings on the background include Calatrava's Gare do Oriente and others from the Nations' Park area in Lisbon.

== Live performances ==
Pet Shop Boys performed "Miracles" at the World Award ceremony in Hamburg in October 2003, where they were honoured for their contribution to music and their charitable work. In December 2012, Pet Shop Boys played a concert with the BBC Philharmonic for Radio 2, accompanied by the Manchester Chamber Choir, who "brought ethereal beauty" to "Miracles", according to Tennant. The song was part of the set list on the Electric Tour from 2013–2014. "Miracles" was also performed at a concert in support of the Teenage Cancer Trust with the Royal Philharmonic Orchestra at Royal Albert Hall in 2017.

== Track listings ==
All tracks are written by Neil Tennant and Chris Lowe except where noted.

- UK CD single 1
1. "Miracles" – 3:57
2. "We're the Pet Shop Boys" (My Robot Friend) – 4:39
- UK CD single 2
1. "Miracles" (extended mix) – 5:46
2. "Miracles" (Lemon Jelly remix) – 6:19
3. "Transparent" – 3:53
- Japanese CD maxi single
1. "Miracles" (radio edit) – 3:57
2. "We're the Pet Shop Boys" (My Robot Friend) – 4:39
3. "Miracles" (Lemon Jelly remix) – 6:19
4. "Transparent" – 3:53
5. "Miracles" (Eric Prydz remix) – 7:34
6. "Miracles" (12″ version) – 5:46
- UK 12-inch single

A. "Miracles" (Lemon Jelly remix) – 6:19
B1. "Miracles" (Eric Prydz remix) – 7:34
B2. "Miracles" (extended mix) – 5:46

== Personnel ==
Credits adapted from the liner notes of PopArt: The Hits and "Miracles".

Pet Shop Boys

- Chris Lowe
- Neil Tennant

Additional musicians

- Stuart Crichton – additional keyboards

Technical personnel

- Adam F – production, engineering, mixing
- Dan Fresh Stein – production, engineering, mixing
- Stuart Crichton – additional production, mixing
- Pete Craigie – additional mixing
- Anne Dudley – orchestra arrangement, conducting

Artwork

- Farrow Design/PSB – design, art direction

== Charts ==
Chart performance for "Miracles"
Chart (2003–2004)	Peak position
Australia (ARIA)	76
Belgium (Ultratip Bubbling Under Flanders)	17
Denmark (Tracklisten)	5
Europe (European Hot 100 Singles)	19
France (SNEP)	81
Germany (GfK)	20
Italy (FIMI)	47
Japan (Oricon)	196
Romania (Romanian Top 100)	39
Scotland (OCC)	14
Spain (PROMUSICAE)	4
Sweden (Sverigetopplistan)	34
Switzerland (Schweizer Hitparade)	97
UK Singles (OCC)	10
UK Dance (OCC)	1
