= The Night I Fell in Love (song) =

Song by Pet Shop Boys

from the album Release
- Released: 1 April 2002
- Recorded: 2001
- Genre: Synth-pop
- Length: 5:04
- Label: Parlophone
- Songwriters: Neil Tennant; Chris Lowe
- Producer: Pet Shop Boys

"The Night I Fell in Love" is a song by English synth-pop duo Pet Shop Boys on their 2002 album, Release. The lyrics were written by Neil Tennant and the music was co-written with Chris Lowe. The song describes a sexual encounter between a gay fan and his rap music idol, who is modeled after Eminem.

== Background and composition ==
"The Night I Fell in Love" was written in 2001, using music from an unreleased song composed in 1993. Tennant and Lowe were fans of Eminem, and the song was a response to accusations of homophobia against the American rapper. Discussing the song's inspiration, Tennant said:

Eminem's defence of the homophobic lyrics on his albums has always been that he's not speaking as himself, he's speaking as a character, and he's representing homophobia in America... I thought it would be quite interesting to take that method and just to imagine a scene where a boy meets a famous rap star backstage at his concert and is surprised to discover he's gay and ends up sleeping with him. Just to present rap in this homosexual context. I mean, there obviously are gay rap stars.

The song was written as a fantasy between two characters and was not intended to imply that Eminem himself is gay. Tennant specified that the fan character, described as school-age in the song, was 18 years old.

Pet Shop Boys decided not to name the rapper. The original title was changed from "The Night I Met Eminem", and the line "I'd met Eminem" became "I'd fallen in love". However, references in the lyrics to Dr. Dre and homophobia in rap music make it possible to identify him. The most obvious reference is when the rapper refers to Eminem's song "Stan":

Then he joked
"Hey, man!
Your name isn't Stan, is it?
We should be together!"

== Response ==
MTV News played "The Night I Fell in Love" to Dr. Dre, who is named in the song, and he responded: "They just gave us a concept. Oh my God. I hope they can stand the backlash. That's funny as hell."

Eminem answered the song in "Can-I-Bitch", which appeared on the bootleg album Straight from the Lab in 2003. The song is mainly a diss track about the rapper Canibus, but it features a moment in which Eminem and Dr. Dre run over the Pet Shop Boys with their car: The sound of four tire impacts is followed by the line:

"What was that?"
"Pet Shop Boys"

Lowe said of the response, "He does it very humorously!"

== Critical reception ==
The song was mentioned in a number of album reviews of Release. Robert Christgau wrote: "The Eminem track is ... wondrous, transcendent, a blow against rap homophobia, a great work of art. If buying this album is the only way you can hear it, don't hesitate." Betty Clarke of The Guardian commented: "The Night I Fell in Love, in which a schoolboy's passion for a homophobic rapper is rewarded with some backstage shenanigans, is both beautifully observed and surprisingly sweet. Even Eminem would smile".

Keith Phipps of The A.V. Club observed: "Essentially rewriting "Stan" as an ode to a meaningful one-night stand, Tennant makes the subject more poignant than pointed: "When I asked why have I heard so much / about him being charged with homophobia and stuff / he just shrugged." The same unspoken understanding that life doesn't always fall into neat patterns, or live up to expectations good or bad, can be found throughout Release".

In CMJ New Music Monthly, Kevin John wrote: "And if you swallow Eminem's homophobia along with his non-pareil rage, then "The Night I Fell In Love" should break your heart. Simultaneously outrageous and touching, it recounts a young man's bittersweet one-night love affair with the real Slim Shady after a concert and, for once, the rhetoric of "keeping it real" gets jammed with sweet, queer frequencies".

== Live performances ==
Pet Shop Boys performed "The Night I Fell in Love" on certain dates of the Release Tour in 2002, including shows in Los Angeles and New York, where Tennant introduced the song saying, "It's about a young rap fan who goes to see his hero, and something very surprising happens to him".

== Personnel ==
Credits adapted from the liner notes of Release: Further Listening 2001–2004.

Pet Shop Boys

- Chris Lowe
- Neil Tennant

Additional musicians

- Johnny Marr – guitar
- Steve Walters – bass guitar
- Jody Linscott – percussion

Technical personnel

- Pet Shop Boys – production
- Pete Gleadall – engineering, programming
- Michael Brauer – mixing
- Rick Chavarria – mixing assistant
