= Break 4 Love =

1988 single by Raze and David Vendetta

Single by Raze
- Released: December 1987
- Recorded: 1987
- Genre: House
- Label: Grove Street; Columbia/CBS
- Songwriters: Vaughan Mason; Keith Thompson
- Producer: Vaughan Mason

Raze singles chronology
"Caught U Cheatin'" (1987)	"Break 4 Love" (1987)	"Let It Roll" (1989)

"All 4 Love (Break 4 Love 1990)"

Single by Raze
- Released: January 27, 1990
- Recorded: 1989
- Genre: Electronic dance; house
- Label: Grove Street; Champion
- Songwriters: Erique Dial; Robert Gordon; J Grant; Vaughan Mason
- Producers: Erique Dial; Vaughan Mason

Raze singles chronology
"Let It Roll" (1990)	"All 4 Love (Break 4 Love 1990)" (1990)	"Can You Feel It" (1990)

"Break 4 Love" is a song written, produced, and recorded by Vaughan Mason, the principal member of American house-music group Raze, the song's original credited performer. The song, the group's only significant US hit, featured vocals by Keith Thompson and Vaughan Mason, as well as sexual sound samples by Erique Dial. The single peaked at number 28 on the UK Singles Chart and topped the US Billboard Hot Dance Club Play chart in 1988.

The song interpolates "Today, Tomorrow and Forever" (1987) by the Castle Beat.

== Commercial performance and reissues ==
"Break 4 Love" reached number 28 on the UK Singles Chart in January 1989. It has since been remixed, re-recorded and reissued on several different independent dance music labels, the most significant of which, "All 4 Love (Break 4 Love 1990)" which featured Lady J and The Secretary of Entertainment and produced and co-written by Erique Dial climbed to number 30 in the UK in early 1990. Further releases of "Break 4 Love" remixes were released in the UK in 1994 and 2003. The 1994 release reached number 44 on the UK Singles Chart and number one on the UK Dance Singles Chart, and the 2003 release at number 64 on the singles chart.

== Critical reception ==
Andy Beevers from Music Week gave the 1994 remix four out of five, writing, "It is no surprise to find this 1988 house classic back again with an inevitable array of remixes. A relatively reverential update from Our Tribe leads the way and has provided the single with a brief spell at the top of the Club Chart. Expect strong specialist demand and a possible crossover."

== Impact ==
British drum and bass DJ and producer Fabio chose "Break 4 Love" as one of his top 10 tracks in 1996, saying, "This was one of the first breakbeat tracks. It used the break to roll the track along. A really sexy track, it always gets people going mad—it's got energy."

== Track listing ==
- Original Grove Street 12-inch single
1. "Break 4 Love" (Drop the Panties)
2. "Break 4 Love" (instrumental)
3. "Break 4 Love" (Spanish Fly)
4. "Break 4 Love" (radio vocals)

== Versions ==
=== Original 1988–1989 versions ===
- "Break 4 Love" (Drop the Panties) – a.k.a. Caught in the Act Mix – spoken vocals by Vaughan Mason
- "Break 4 Love" (Radio Vocals) – a.k.a. English Mix, English Version, Vaughan Mason 12" Mix – sung vocals by Keith Thompson
- "Break 4 Love" (Instrumental)
- "Break 4 Love" (Spanish Fly) – spoken vocals by Jeanette Fraginals
- "Break 4 Love" (Spanish Mix) – similar to Spanish Fly, but no break
- "Break 4 Love" (French Mix)
- "Break 4 Love" (Italian Mix)

All of these versions run approximately 5:25.

A 3:18 edit of the English Mix was used as the 7" single version.

== Charts ==
=== Weekly charts ===
1988–1989 Weekly chart performance for "Break 4 Love"
Chart (1988–1989)	Peak position
UK Singles (Official Charts)	28
US Dance Club Songs (Billboard)	1
US Dance Singles Sales (Billboard)	1
US Hot R&B/Hip-Hop Songs (Billboard)	24

1990 Weekly chart performance for "All 4 Love (Break 4 Love 1990)"
Chart (1990)	Peak position
UK Singles (Official Charts)	30

1994 Weekly chart performance for "Break 4 Love"
Chart (1994)	Peak position
UK Singles (Official Charts)	44
UK Dance (Official Charts)	1
UK Club Chart (Music Week)	1

2003 Weekly chart performance for "Break 4 Love"
Chart (2003)	Peak position
UK Singles (Official Charts)	64

=== Year-end charts ===
1994 Year-end chart performance for "Break 4 Love"
Chart (1994)	Position
UK Club Chart (Music Week)	59

== The Collaboration version ==
"Break 4 Love"

Single by Peter Rauhofer + Pet Shop Boys = The Collaboration
- B-side: "Remixes"
- Released: November 20, 2001
- Recorded: 2001
- Genre: Dance
- Label: Star 69
- Songwriter: Vaughan Mason
- Producers: Peter Rauhofer; Pet Shop Boys

Peter Rauhofer singles chronology
"Do It Properly" (1999)	"Break 4 Love" (2001)

Pet Shop Boys singles chronology
"You Only Tell Me You Love Me When You're Drunk" (2000)	"Break 4 Love" (2001)	"Home and Dry" (2002)

"Break 4 Love" was covered by Peter Rauhofer and Pet Shop Boys, released under the name "Peter Rauhofer + Pet Shop Boys = The Collaboration". The single was not released in the United Kingdom and did not chart there. The song can be found on the US bonus disc of the Pet Shop Boys album Release and as a B-side of CD2 of its single "Home and Dry".

The single did not chart on the US Billboard Hot 100, but it peaked at number one on the Hot Dance Club Play chart, and peaked at number 51 on the US Hot Singles Sales chart.

=== Track listings ===
- US 12-inch single: Star 69
1. "Break 4 Love" (USA club mix)
2. "Break 4 Love" (Friburn and Urik Tribal mix)
3. "Break 4 Love" (Mike Monday's Kit Kat dub)
4. "Break 4 Love" (the classic mix)
- US CD single part 1: Star 69 (CD12172)
1. "Break 4 Love" (UK radio mix)
2. "Break 4 Love" (US radio mix)
3. "Break 4 Love" (classic radio mix)
4. "Break 4 Love" (Friburn and Urik Tribal mix)
5. "Break 4 Love" (USA club mix)
6. "Break 4 Love" (Mike Monday Kit Kat dub)
7. "Break 4 Love" (classic club mix)
8. "Break 4 Love" (Ralphie's Dub for Love)
- US CD single part 2: Star 69 (CD12192)
1. "Break 4 Love" (Laroz and Amdursky mix)
2. "Break 4 Love" (Friburn and Urik Hi-Pass mix)
3. "Break 4 Love" (Michael Moog club mix)
4. "Break 4 Love" (Richard Morel's Pink Noize club mix)
5. "Break 4 Love" (Sunshi Moriwaki's 2 Step remix)
6. "Break 4 Love" (Michael Moog dub)

=== Charts ===
Chart performance for "Break 4 Love"
Chart (2001)	Peak position
US Dance Club Songs (Billboard)	1
US Dance Singles Sales (Billboard)	6
US Hot Singles Sales (Billboard)	51
