= Raze (house-music group) =

American electronic dance music group

- Origin: United States
- Genre: House
- Years active: 1986–1992
- Labels: Grove Street Records; Champion Records; Columbia/CBS Records
- Past members: Vaughan Mason; Erique Dial; Keith Thompson

Raze was an American electronic dance music group formed in 1986 by multi-instrumentalist and producer Vaughan Mason. Raze also included producer Erique Dial, vocalists Keith Thompson, Wanda Sykes, Bobby Coleman, and DJ Stephon Johnson.

== Biography ==
Early releases included "Jack the Groove" and "Let the Music Move U", both in 1986. "Jack the Groove" was one of the first house music hits in the UK, entering the top 20 of the UK Singles Chart in January 1987. Along with Steve "Silk" Hurley's "Jack Your Body", a UK No. 1 the same month, it presaged the popularity of the genre in the UK in the late 1980s.

Raze hit No. 1 on the US Hot Dance Club Play chart in 1988 with "Break 4 Love" which also crossed over to urban radio stations, where it became a moderate hit. "Break 4 Love" hit No. 1 on the US dance chart again in 2001, when it was covered by Peter Rauhofer and the Pet Shop Boys, under the name the Collaboration. In 2025 the track was called a "seminal house music track of the late 1980s" by the BBC in an article about the recreation of '80s raves using virtual reality.

In October 2004, "Break 4 Love" appeared in the popular video game Grand Theft Auto: San Andreas, playing on the house music radio station SF-UR.

== Discography ==
=== Albums ===
Year	Title
1988	Album 88
1991	All 4 Love

=== Singles ===
Year	Title	Chart positions			
Year	Title	US R&B	US Dance	UK	UK Dance
1986	"Jack the Groove"	—	—	20	—
1987	"Let the Music Move U"	—	—	57	—
1987	"Caught U Cheatin'"	—	—	77	—
1988	"Break 4 Love"	24	1	28	—
1989	"Let It Roll"†	—	1	27	—
1990	"All 4 Love (Break 4 Love 1990)"‡	—	—	30	—
1990	"Can You Feel It"¶	—	—	62	—
1991	"Let It Move U"^	—	—	—	—
1991	"Bass Power"	—	16	—	—
1994	"Break 4 Love" (Our Tribe Club Mix)	—	—	44	1
2003	"Break 4 Love" (David Vendetta Mix)	—	—	64	—
"—" denotes releases that did not chart.

† – Raze presents Doug Lazy
‡ – Raze featuring Lady J and Secretary of Entertainment
¶ – Raze/The Legend (montage of six Raze tracks, Champion Records UK)
^ – Raze presents ESTB
