= Oh Romeo =

Concept group that plays Hi-NRG music

- Origin: New York City, New York, United States
- Genres: Hi-NRG
- Years active: 1982–1991
- Labels: "O" Records, Bobcat Records, Oh My! Records, Memo Records, Hot Productions
- Past members: Bobby Orlando

Oh Romeo was a Hi-NRG concept group created by the Hi-NRG mogul Bobby "O" Orlando in 1982.

== Composition ==
Besides Bobby Orlando, who figured in all releases of the group, there were different session singers and models used for each release.

Throughout its existence, Oh Romeo was managed by Joseph Lodato and Lee Borden, who worked in labels associated with Bobby Orlando.

== Lyrics ==
Bobby Orlando was responsible for writing the lyrics of the group. While some of the lyrics were published under his name, others were published under the Orlando pseudonym "C. Shore". C. Chase (Clifton "Jiggs" Chase) cowrote "Saving Myself for the One that I Love" with Bobby Orlando.

== Reception ==
During its active years, Oh Romeo toured the US and Latin America, enjoying significant popularity in Latin America, specially in Chile and Mexico.

During the same period, Orlando created other projects, such as The Beat Box Boys, Hotline, Banana Republic, The New York Models, Hippies with Haircuts, SpoogeBoy, Girly, Barbie & the Kens and other projects.

=== Discography ===
Year	Song title	Label
1983	Try It (I'm in Love with a Married Man) / Lookin' Out	Bobcat Records
1983	These Memories	Bobcat Records
1984	Once Is Not Enough / Light of Love	Oh My! Records
1985	One More Shot	Memo Records
1987	Living Out A Fantasy	Bobby O Music

- The song "One More Shot" was also featured on the 1994 Avex Trax album Super Eurobeat Presents Hi-NRG '80s.
- In 1991 the Hot Productions label released their greatest hits album, These Memories: The Best of Oh Romeo.
