= Scott King (artist) =

English artist (born 1969)

Scott King (born 1969, Goole, England) is a graphic designer and visual artist.

His work is in the collection of the Museum of Modern Art and the Tate.

Past experiences include Art Director of i-D and Creative Director of Sleazenation magazines, for which he was awarded 'Best Cover' and 'Best Designed Feature of the Year' prizes. King occasionally produces work under the banner 'CRASH!' with writer and historian Matt Worley. King's work has been exhibited widely in European and American galleries, including the Institute of Contemporary Arts in London, Kunst-Werke in Berlin, Portikus in Frankfurt, White Columns in New York, Kunstverein Munich and the Museum of Modern Art in New York.

Scott's graphic design work, which often includes political phrases or images, resembles cut-and-paste style posters. He also makes tea towels and flags which are embroidered with wording. His typographic design work has been compared to Barbara Kruger.
