= Chris Lowe =

English musician and songwriter (born 1959)

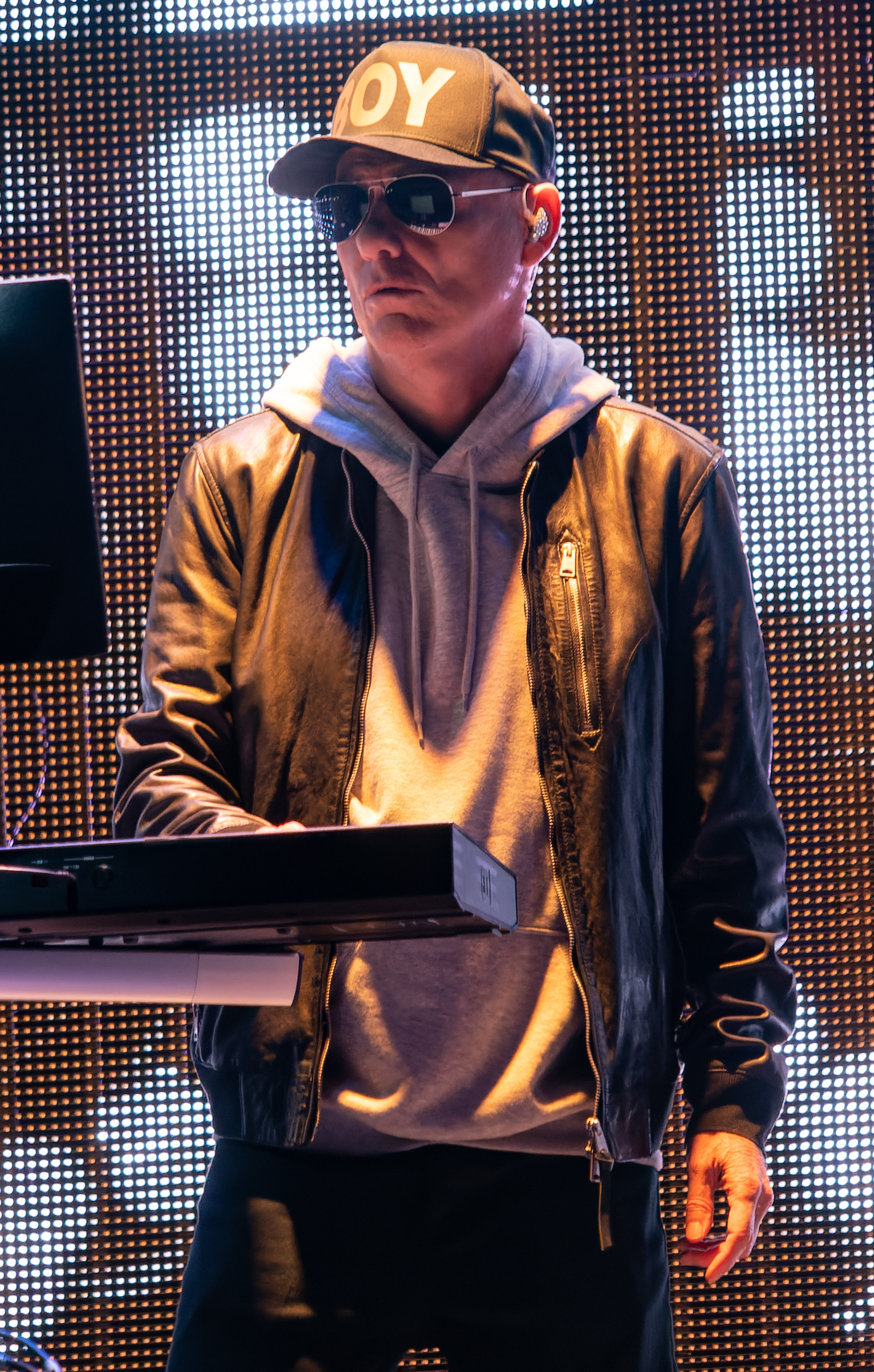
- Lowe performing at Glastonbury Festival 2022

Background information
- Born: Christopher Sean Lowe; 4 October 1959 (age 67); Blackpool, Lancashire, England
- Genres: Synth-pop; electropop; dance; IDM; electronic
- Occupations: Musician; songwriter; producer
- Instruments: Keyboards; synthesizers; piano; vocals; trombone
- Years active: 1981–present
- Labels: Parlophone; Spaghetti; x2
- Member of: Pet Shop Boys
- Website: petshopboys.co.uk

Christopher Sean Lowe (born 4 October 1959) is an English musician and songwriter who formed the synth-pop duo Pet Shop Boys with Neil Tennant. He is primarily the keyboardist and occasionally a vocalist, and he is the co-author of the catalogue of Pet Shop Boys songs. Lowe is known for his impassive stage persona, standing still behind a keyboard, wearing a hat and dark glasses.

Growing up in a musical environment in Blackpool with a grandfather who was a professional trombonist, Lowe learned trombone and piano and performed in several orchestras and bands in his youth. At dance clubs in the late 1970s, his taste in music became focused on disco. In 1981, he met Tennant while working in London, and the pair began writing songs together, influenced by Lowe's passion for electronic dance music. Lowe planned to become an architect, and he earned a BA and a BArch at the University of Liverpool before quitting the course to embark on a music career in 1985.

Lowe's ear for music trends has been a factor in the duo's success. Pet Shop Boys had 31 top-10 entries on Billboard magazine's Dance Club Songs chart—the most of any duo or group—and they are the most successful duo in UK music history, with 44 top 40 hits. As a member of Pet Shop Boys, Lowe has been recognised for his outstanding contribution to music by both the Ivor Novello Awards and the Brit Awards.

== Early life, family and education ==
Christopher Sean Lowe was born and raised in Blackpool, Lancashire. He is the oldest of four siblings. His grandfather, Syd Flood, was a trombonist and a member of the comedy jazz troupe The Nitwits. His mother was a dancer, and his father—a sales representative for the gas board—could play piano by ear. Lowe learned to play trombone and piano as a child. He attended Thames Primary School and then Arnold School, where he played in the school orchestra and dance band and studied music as an A-level subject.

Lowe played trombone in One Under the Eight, a semi-professional seven-piece dance band that performed favourites like "Hello Dolly", "La Bamba" and "Moon River", and he joined the Musicians' Union with them. He was also in a local brass band, the Norman Memorial Youth Band, and briefly played keyboards with a school rock band called Stallion.

One of the first records Lowe had as a child was "Baby Love" (1964) by Diana Ross and The Supremes. Entering his teenage years, he preferred listening to artists his grandparents enjoyed, like Dorothy Squires, Frank Sinatra, and Tom Jones, rather than the music that was popular with his peers at the time. Lowe became a fan of disco at the height of its popularity, around the time of Saturday Night Fever (1977). He worked as a glass collector at the Dixieland Showbar on Blackpool's Central Pier, where being part of the crowd during dance floor-fillers like "Oops Up Side Your Head" (1979) by the Gap Band made a strong impression on him.

Lowe was encouraged by his family to pursue a career in music, but he was concerned about job security and decided to become an architect instead, starting a course at the University of Liverpool in 1978. He had developed an interest in the subject as a child, designing imaginary houses during his family's frequent moves. He played trombone in the university orchestra for a term but did not enjoy it. In 1981, he completed the first part of his course and received a Bachelor of Arts with Honours. During a work placement that year at Michael Aukett Associates architectural practice in London, he designed a staircase for an industrial estate in Milton Keynes. It was at this time that he met Neil Tennant in Chelsea Record Centre, a hi-fi shop on King's Road in London. As their music career developed, Lowe continued his architecture course and earned a Bachelor of Architecture, but did not complete the final work requirement to qualify as an architect before he and Tennant committed full time to the Pet Shop Boys in 1985.

== Musical career ==
=== Pet Shop Boys ===
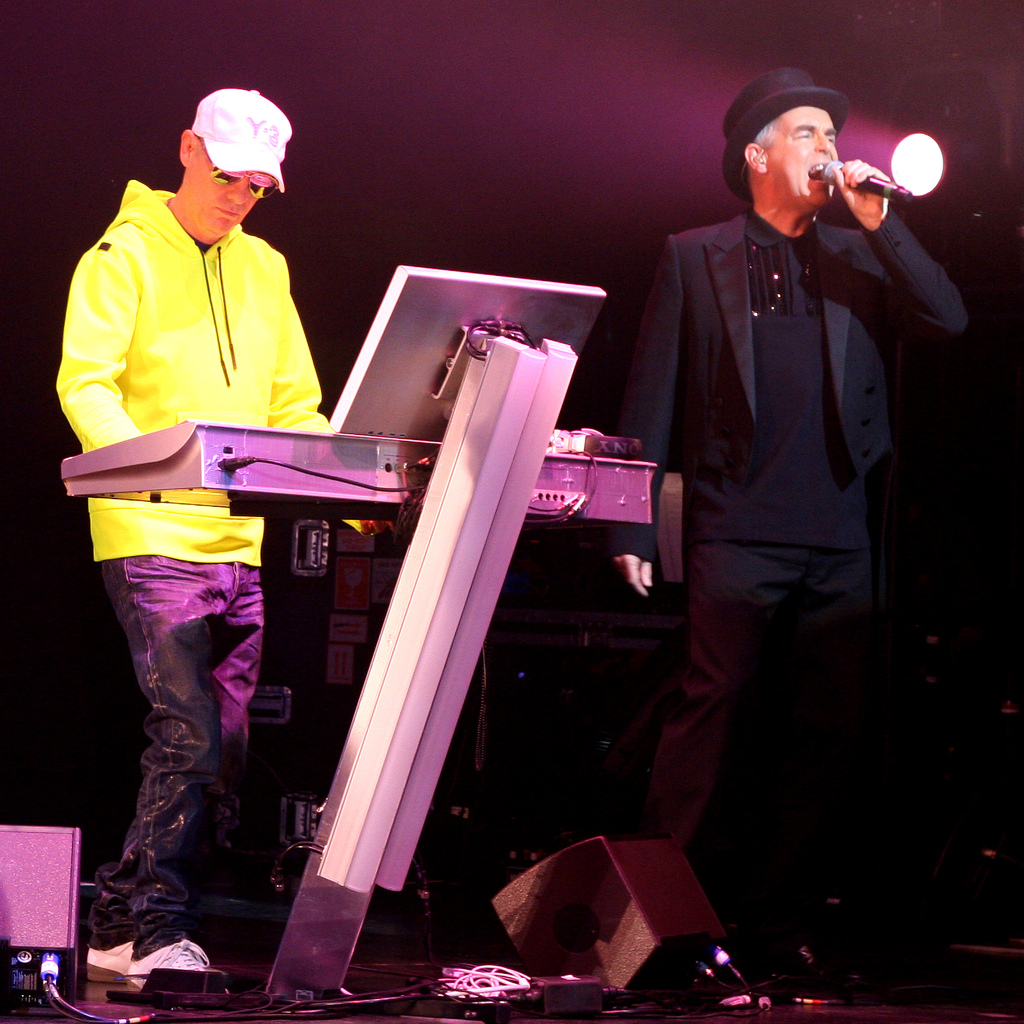
Lowe (left) with Neil Tennant in a Pet Shop Boys concert, Boston, 2006

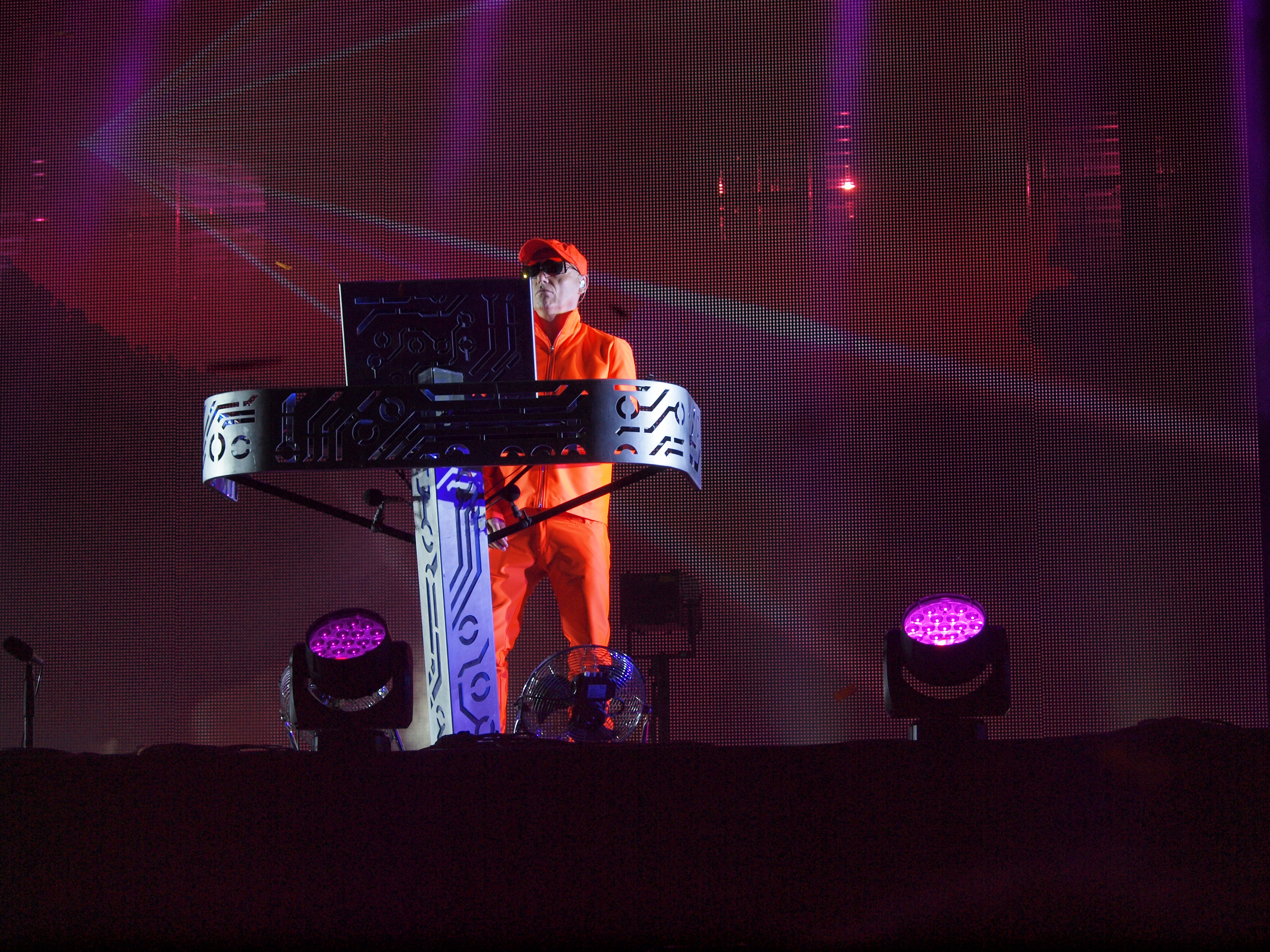
Lowe performing at Pori Jazz 2014 in Pori, Finland

Lowe and Tennant began writing music together shortly after their first meeting in August 1981. During their early sessions, Lowe played a Korg MS-10 monophonic synthesizer belonging to Tennant. Lowe had musical training and fluency, while Tennant was largely self-taught and had been writing his own songs for a decade. In 1982, Lowe wrote a piece of music on the piano at his family home in Blackpool and gave a cassette recording to Tennant to write lyrics. The song, "Jealousy", was later released on their fourth studio album, Behaviour (1990). Lowe called it "probably the first time I'd ever constructed a song".

Lowe has strong views about his taste in music, as he expressed in a 1986 interview with Entertainment Tonight:

I don't like country and western. I don't like rock music... I don't like rockabilly or rock and roll particularly. I don't like much really, do I? But what I do like, I love passionately.

Lowe's affinity for dance music influenced the direction of the duo's songwriting. In London, he discovered new music being played in underground and gay clubs; his reaction at the time was, "Everything I've heard before is redundant now, this is all I like". A particular favourite of his was "Passion" by The Flirts, written and produced by Bobby Orlando in 1982. The following year, Pet Shop Boys started working with Orlando on some of their songs, including an early version of "West End Girls".

Over the years, Lowe kept up with music trends at clubs in the UK as well as places like Ibiza and Berlin. Steve Harnell, editor of Classic Pop magazine, credited Lowe for "the way that he's kept the duo's music sounding fresh and relevant to a new generation of fans". Lowe described his continuing sources of inspiration in a 2013 interview with Stereogum:

I'm always very inspired by sounds. Whether it be Brazilian music or the Spanglish radio stations in LA — or even hearing dubstep for the first time — I'm always intrigued by interesting new sounds and the way they filter through popular music … or by how different cultures do their own take on what is "dance" music or "electronic" music.

Lowe was also the motivating force behind two of Pet Shop Boys' more downbeat albums — the guitar-driven Release (2002) and the moody Elysium (2012). He has a knack for selecting cover versions, according to Tennant, including the Elvis Presley tribute "Always on My Mind" (1987) and the Village People anthem "Go West" (1993).

Producer Julian Mendelsohn noticed Lowe's ability to compose keyboard lines in a matter of minutes during the recording of Pet Shop Boys' second album Actually (1987). According to programmer Pete Gleadall: "People often don't realise Chris' input to the whole process. He basically writes the bulk of the backing to most of the songs, and quite often the melody lines as well, which Neil embellishes and develops". The duo's songwriting process involves working on songs together as well as coming up with their parts separately and sharing them with each other, particularly since the COVID-19 lockdown. In a 2024 interview with La Nación, Lowe remarked that he enjoys figuring out the right music for Tennant's lyrics, calling it an exercise in finding the chords and sounds that best match the melody.

=== Instruments and equipment ===
==== Keyboard setups ====
Since starting out with Tennant's Korg MS-10, Lowe has used other models of the brand, including the Korg M1 and the Korg Triton. Early on, Pet Shop Boys made use of samples from an Emulator. Lowe used a Fairlight CMI to compose songs through the early 1990s. He began using a PowerBook with Notator Logic, along with a Roland Sound Canvas SC-88 and a PC-200 keyboard to write at home. In the 2020s, he has used a similar setup of a laptop and keyboard for composing songs.

Lowe's equipment for live performances has varied over the years. On the Performance Tour in 1991, Lowe had a keyboard setup with a Korg M1 synthesizer and an Akai S1000 sampler, and he also used a Lync LN-1000 portable keyboard, although at times during the elaborate production he appeared onstage without any instrument. He used a Roland JD-800 on the 2002 Release Tour, a stripped-down production where he played live keyboards more than usual. He told The Washington Post:

I find it a lot more rewarding. Before, I could never actually rationalize the point of playing anything live because I could always put it in the computer and the computer could play it better. But this time I'm playing a lot of piano, which is really enjoyable, and I'm getting a lot more out of it.

On the Fundamental Tour (2006–07), Lowe's keyboard setup included a Korg Triton with a pair of Access Virus rackmount modules. For the Pandemonium Tour (2009–10), he used a master keyboard and a Moog synthesizer, a Kaoss Pad to add effects, and a small set of electronic drums as "a change from playing the keyboards". On Dreamworld: The Greatest Hits Live (2022–25), Pet Shop Boys' long-time FOH engineer Holger Schwark explained:

A lot of what Neil and Chris play is very similar to the original releases – they sample themselves from the original multitrack records, so we hear audio that sometimes has been programmed and put together 20 to 30 years ago. There's a lot of audio history on this show with a blend of old and new material. […] Keyboard sounds are split between Chris, Clare Uchima and multitrack.

A monitor on Lowe's keyboard setup displays a musical score, lyrics, and cues.

==== Vocals ====
Lowe contributes occasional backing vocals and has taken the lead on a few songs, including "Paninaro", for which he also wrote the lyrics. His vocals are often spoken rather than sung, sometimes in the form of a list, such as reciting days of the week on "Thursday". When he does sing, as on "This Used to Be the Future" (2009), he prefers to have his voice treated with pitch correction software like Melodyne. He has stated that he dislikes the sound of his voice. Lowe has performed "Paninaro" on tours, including Dreamworld: The Greatest Hits Live. On the Performance Tour, another of his lead vocal B-sides, "We All Feel Better in the Dark", was staged with Lowe stripping down to his underwear.

==== Other instruments ====
Lowe played trombone on the song "I Want a Lover" on the first Pet Shop Boys album, Please (1986), (Note: In the notes to the album Please, Tennant and Lowe commented: "T: Chris brought his trombone into the studio. He wasn't very keen on doing it." L: "[Producer] Blue Weaver insisted. I learned the trombone when I was about ten. My grandfather played the trombone".) and he appeared with his trombone in the video for the song "What Have I Done to Deserve This?" in 1987. The song "Later Tonight" from Please was recorded live in the studio with Lowe on piano. He played "It's a Sin" on the Wurlitzer organ in the Blackpool Tower Ballroom for the 2006 documentary Pet Shop Boys: A Life in Pop.

=== Solo appearances ===
In 1993, Lowe wrote and produced the track "Do the Right Thing" for footballer Ian Wright, who played for Lowe's favourite team, Arsenal. The song featured backing vocals by long-time Pet Shop Boys backing singer Sylvia Mason-James, and the single featured remixes by Rollo.

Two years later, Lowe had a cameo in the Australian soap opera Neighbours. His appearance was filmed while Pet Shop Boys were touring Australia in 1994.

In 2004, he was commissioned to do music for an advertisement for the sunscreen brand Blockhead. The song ended up in a remixed version on a "Café Mambo" compilation.

Lowe wrote the music for the song "Streets of Berlin", featured in the 2006 revival of Bent at the Trafalgar Studios in Whitehall.

In 2011, Lowe appeared as featured vocalist on Stop Modernists' cover version of the New Order song "Subculture". It was the first time he had appeared as a vocalist on a non-Pet Shop Boys project.

== Public image ==
Lowe adopts an understated public presence, often wearing sportswear and with his eyes hidden behind sunglasses, and usually wearing headwear of some sort (a baseball cap inscribed with the word "BOY" being his most iconic) – although in the duo's early years his face was shown fully unobscured. In Pet Shop Boys videos and photoshoots, he is often seen as a spectator standing slightly behind Tennant. For the duo's 1988 musical film It Couldn't Happen Here, he spoke very little dialogue compared to Tennant. In live performances he rarely interacts with the audience and often stands still while playing keyboards. In 1995, The Guardian wrote that he was "possibly more famous for not doing anything than almost anyone else in the history of popular entertainment."

A Guardian profile of the group from 1993 noted that Lowe's image of "silent Chris walking two steps behind singing Neil" was an intentional choice, developed in discussion with photographer and music video director Eric Watson; Watson has said that "Chris didn't want to be seen playing keyboards or anything. We realised there was something about somebody singing and somebody else doing nothing – just looking, then looking away – that adds a hideous tension."
