= Neil Tennant =

English singer and songwriter (born 1954)

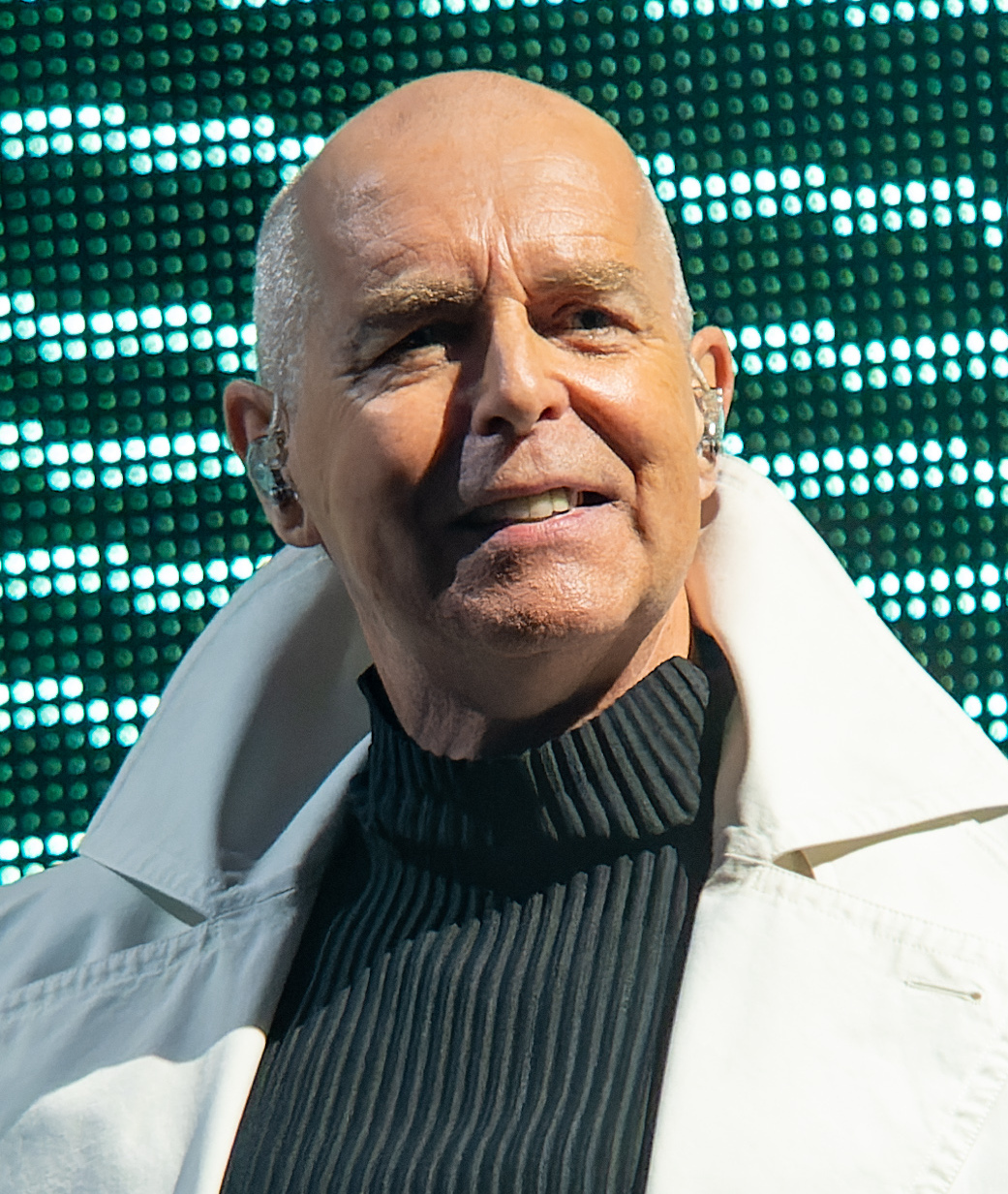
- Tennant performing with Pet Shop Boys in 2022

Background information
- Born: Neil Francis Tennant; 10 July 1954 (age 72); North Shields, Northumberland, England
- Origin: Newcastle upon Tyne, England
- Genres: Synth-pop; electropop; dance; disco; alternative dance
- Occupations: Singer; songwriter; music journalist
- Instruments: Vocals; keyboards; synthesizer; guitar
- Years active: 1970–present
- Labels: Parlophone; Spaghetti; x2
- Member of: Pet Shop Boys
- Website: petshopboys.co.uk

Neil Francis Tennant (born 10 July 1954) is an English singer and songwriter. He is the lead singer and lyricist of the synth-pop duo Pet Shop Boys, which he formed with Chris Lowe in 1981. He is known for his distinctive vocal style with occasional speak-singing and for his eloquent lyrics set to dance music.

Tennant grew up in Newcastle, where he joined the Young People's Theatre. He taught himself guitar and formed a short-lived folk group with friends. His unhappy experiences at St Cuthbert's Catholic Grammar School motivated him to dream of pop stardom and later inspired such songs as "It's a Sin".

After moving to London for university in the early 1970s, Tennant had a career in publishing, including a stint as an editor at Marvel UK, and he became a music journalist for Smash Hits, where he served as assistant editor in the early 1980s. He wrote songs in a singer-songwriter style but did not succeed in launching a music career until he began collaborating with Lowe as Pet Shop Boys. In 1985, he left Smash Hits and within a year, the duo had entered their imperial phase—a phrase coined by Tennant to describe the period in which a musical artist is regarded to be at their commercial and creative peak—with four number one hits by 1988.

As a member of Pet Shop Boys, Tennant has been recognised for his outstanding contribution to music by both the Ivor Novello Awards and the Brit Awards. Individually, he received an honorary Doctor of Letters from Durham University.

== Early life ==
Neil Francis Tennant was born in the town of North Shields, approximately 8 miles east of Newcastle upon Tyne, to William W. Tennant (1923–2009) and Sheila M. (Watson) Tennant (1923–2008). His mother was of Irish heritage, and his father's family had Scottish roots. He has an older sister, Susan, and two younger brothers, Simon and Philip. William Tennant was a sales manager for a rubber company. The family moved to Greenfield Road (opposite the corner of South Bend), Brunton Park, Gosforth shortly after Neil was born.

Tennant was raised as a Roman Catholic, and he served as an altar boy. He attended St Oswald's Catholic Primary School, where he was happy, followed by St Cuthbert's Catholic Grammar School, where he did not fit in with the school's football culture and strict moralizing. His songs "This Must Be the Place I Waited Years to Leave" and "It's a Sin" refer to his time there. Tennant developed an aloof attitude towards his classmates as a "survival persona" and dreamed of leaving Newcastle behind and becoming a pop star.

In 1965, Tennant joined the Young People's Theatre, where he learned about stage performance and became interested in writing music for theatre. When Women in Love (1969) was filmed in Newcastle, Tennant was an uncredited extra and used his earnings to buy the Beatles' White Album. As a teenager, he joined the Literary and Philosophical Society of Newcastle upon Tyne, which was both a library and a social gathering place.

Tennant taught himself to play guitar at the age of 12, using the tutorials Play in a Day by Bert Weedon and Hold Down a Chord by John Pearse. He started writing his own songs based around the chords he learned. He used his guitar studies to learn how to play the piano in his family home, and he also played cello in school.

In 1970, Tennant started a folk music group named Dust with Christopher Dowell, a friend from the Young People's Theatre. They were heavily influenced by The Incredible String Band. The group, which also featured two female friends, recorded a session of five songs that were broadcast on BBC Radio Newcastle in 1971. Tennant wrote several of their songs including "Can You Hear the Dawn Break?", which he regards as his first "proper" song. The folk group broke up due to creative differences as Tennant became more influenced by the music of David Bowie.

== Early career ==
Tennant left Newcastle in 1972 to study history at North London Polytechnic (now part of London Metropolitan University). During the summers of 1973 and 1974, he worked as an assistant in the manuscripts department of the British Museum. He completed an honours degree in 1975 and then worked for two years as the production editor for Marvel UK, an imprint of Marvel Comics. His job entailed compiling American comics into a weekly publication, anglicising the dialogue to suit British readers, and ensuring that risqué characters like Red Sonja were redrawn with more modest clothing to make them suitable for the general audience of the weeklies. He also wrote occasional features for the comics, including interviews with pop stars Marc Bolan and Alex Harvey.

In 1977, Tennant moved to Macdonald Educational publishing, where he edited The Dairy Book of Home Management (1980) and various illustrated books about cookery, playing the guitar and other home interests. He next worked at ITV Books, where he edited TV tie-in books, including one of Mary Berry's cookbooks.

Tennant became acquainted with the staff of Smash Hits when he commissioned the magazine's designer, Steve Bush, to design a book about the 1981 Madness film Take It or Leave It. Smash Hits editor David Hepworth offered Tennant a job editing The Smash Hits Yearbook and also named him news editor of the magazine when he started work there in June 1982. Tennant wrote features and reviews for the teen pop magazine and also edited the yearbook from 1982 to 1985. He set up the American version, Star Hits, in New York in 1983, and he interviewed then up-and-coming singer Madonna. Tennant became assistant editor of Smash Hits, and was offered the position of editor before his departure in 1985.

During this period, Tennant continued to write music in a singer-songwriter style. He auditioned for Rocket Records in 1973, and in 1981 he submitted a demo to other record companies without success. Some of his early songs were later released, including "Nothing Has Been Proved" (1989), performed by Dusty Springfield, and "Nervously" (1990) and "Hey, Headmaster" (1993) by Pet Shop Boys.

== Music career ==
=== Pet Shop Boys ===
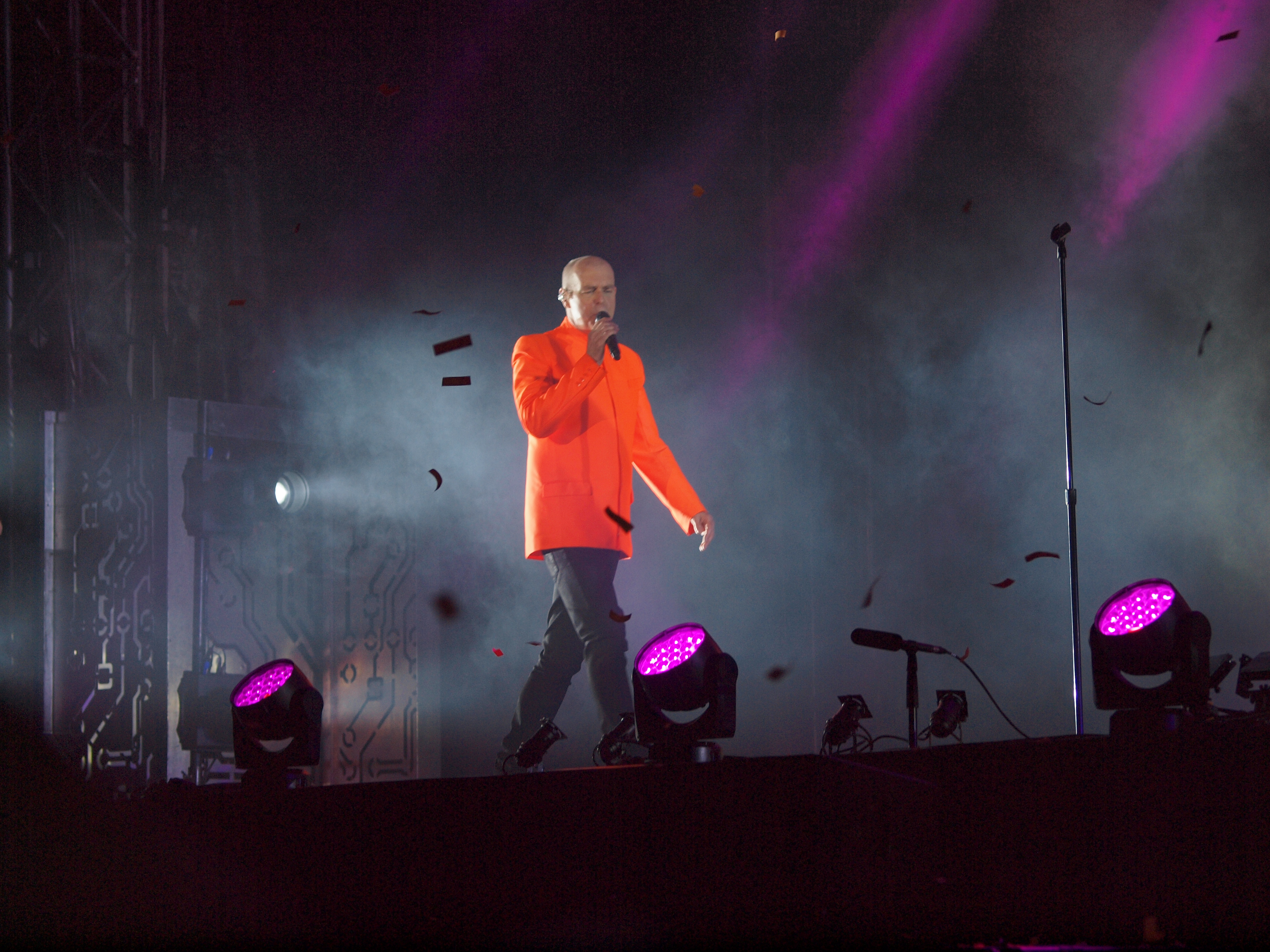
Tennant performing at Pori Jazz 2014 in Pori, Finland

Tennant met Chris Lowe in August 1981 and they began their songwriting partnership shortly afterwards. Describing their early sessions, Tennant recalled:

I'm playing acoustic guitar and he's playing these bass lines on a monophonic synthesizer. He's an experienced musician and can play the keyboard very fluently. Remember, at this point I'm 27, 28 years old...bass lines had never even occurred to me. We sort of released something in each other. There was immediately something there.

Tennant was used to singing his own songs but initially had reservations about being a lead singer. He started singing lessons after turning professional in 1985. At Lowe's suggestion, he tried to make his lyrics more "sexy", writing about nightlife in the West End of London where they spent time.

In 1983, an opportunity arose for Tennant to go to New York to interview The Police for Smash Hits. While there, he arranged to meet Bobby Orlando, a producer whom he and Lowe admired. Tennant mentioned he was writing songs in his spare time, and Orlando agreed to record some tracks with him and Lowe at a later date. Orlando produced the Pet Shop Boys' first single, an early version of "West End Girls", in 1984. Pet Shop Boys signed a deal with Parlophone Records in March 1985, and Tennant left Smash Hits the following month as he and Lowe, who was two-thirds of the way through an architecture degree, committed full time to a music career.

=== Musical style ===
==== Lyrics and composition ====
Tennant writes the lyrics for the majority of Pet Shop Boys songs. Cultural critic Olivia Laing described the songs as "instantly recognizable for their knack of making oddly formal language flow seamlessly into pop music". In his oration for Tennant's honorary Doctor of Letters at Durham University, Professor Stephen Mumford called his lyrics "Full of literary, political and historical allusions ... layered with multiple meanings that can be read lightly and superficially or deeply and philosophically".

In his book One Hundred Lyrics and a Poem: 1979–2016, Tennant discussed his sources of inspiration. He often uses common expressions such as "Left to My Own Devices" and "I Wouldn't Normally Do This Kind of Thing", as well as literary references like "Can You Forgive Her?" from the work of the same name by Anthony Trollope. He has written songs using different personas, including a kept woman in "Rent", and he has drawn on his own formative experiences, as in "It's a Sin". He wrote a trio of songs about Christopher Dowell, his friend from Newcastle, who died from AIDS in 1989: "It Couldn't Happen Here" alludes to their early complacency about the disease, "Being Boring" is about their friendship, and "Your Funny Uncle" describes his funeral.

Tennant has praised the group The Specials and singer-songwriter Elvis Costello, highlighting "Ghost Town" and "Shipbuilding" as protest songs successfully putting politics into pop music. In his own songs, Tennant says he conveys "political through personal"; for example: ""King's Cross" is a song about [Margaret] Thatcher. I think it's quite a strong song about Thatcher. You don't have to say, "Step down Margaret," though. I don't think many directly political songs work, actually. I think you infiltrate through pop music".

The duo's songwriting process includes working together and separately on songs. Tennant comes up with words for music that Lowe has composed, and he also writes lyrics to be set to music. He composes music himself on piano or guitar. During the COVID-19 lockdowns, he learned to use GarageBand to collaborate on songs for the album Nonetheless.

==== Vocals ====
Tennant has a tenor voice with a natural sibilance. He had a tendency to sing through his nose, making his voice sound thin, and was taught by his vocal coach, Eve Cohen, to sing from the throat for a fuller sound. He cites David Bowie along with three women—Nina Simone, Billie Holiday, and Dusty Springfield—as his main influences as a singer. Lowe compares his partner's singing style to Julie Andrews.

Richard Cromelin of the Los Angeles Times observed: "Tennant's deadpan tone can seem inexpressive, but when it's set in the rich-sounding, sweeping instrumental arrangements, it takes on the ironic stance that defines the Pet Shop Boys' music. His detachment has a plaintive quality, a kind of Every-lad wistfulness that brings a humanity to the microchip music". Tennant himself has said: "I think there's something in my voice that has a distancing quality, it doesn't throw itself into emotion, it seems to stand back a bit ... to me it makes it sound more romantic, because there's this kind of small, high voice against this big background, and there's a massive musical contrast there, which is quite moving."

Tennant uses a sprechgesang, or speak-singing, style on some songs, notably "Left to My Own Devices". He wrote "West End Girls" as a rap, influenced by Grandmaster Flash. More recently, "New London Boy" from the 2024 album Nonetheless included a rap passage; producer James Ford commented: "Neil's style is quite groundbreaking. He has such a distinctive style".

Tennant prefers his vocals to be double tracked. Samples of his voice are also used. For the 2006 album Fundamental, producer Trevor Horn recorded Tennant singing every note and semitone across three octaves so they could be played on a keyboard in a process referred to as the "Neilotron". During the recording of Nonetheless, samples of Tennant's voice were used to recreate the Miserere.

=== Solo appearances ===
In addition to his work with Chris Lowe as Pet Shop Boys, Tennant has worked on several side projects.

- In 1989, Tennant worked with Electronic, singing backing vocals on their first single "Getting Away with It" and taking lead vocals on the 1992 single "Disappointed". Along with Lowe, he wrote and appeared on the Electronic album track "The Patience of a Saint", on which he shared lead vocals with Bernard Sumner.
- In 1992, Tennant's backing vocals featured prominently on the Boy George single "The Crying Game" and on the Cicero single "Love Is Everywhere". Both reached the UK Top 40 singles chart.
- In August 1997, Tennant's vocals were featured on two live recordings by the British group Suede that were released as b-sides to their single "Filmstar". One track was a cover of the Pet Shop Boys track "Rent", and the second was a duet with Suede singer Brett Anderson on the Suede song "Saturday Night".
- In 1998, Tennant coordinated a charity album Twentieth-Century Blues: The Songs of Noël Coward raising money for Red Hot Organization. The album featured cover versions of songs composed by Noël Coward. In addition to the track "Sail Away" contributed by Pet Shop Boys, Tennant co-produced "There Are Bad Times Just Around the Corner" contributed by Robbie Williams and sang backing vocals on "Twentieth Century Blues" contributed by Elton John.
- In 1998, along with Neil Hannon of The Divine Comedy, Tennant sang backing vocals on the Robbie Williams' single "No Regrets".
- In 2005, Tennant provided lyrics and sang on the track "Tranquilizer" by DJ Tom Stephan (a.k.a. Superchumbo), who had previously remixed a number of Pet Shop Boys tracks.
- In June 2006, Tennant provided backing vocals on "Throw" by DJ Fresh.
- In 2007, Tennant co-produced Rufus Wainwright's album Release the Stars.
- In 2008, Tennant's vocals featured in The Killers' Christmas song "Joseph, Better You Than Me".
- In 2014, Tennant provided vocals on "Were You There" by Diamond Version.
- In 2017, Tennant sang a duet with Chrissie Hynde on "Let's Get Lost", which originally appeared on the 2016 album Alone by The Pretenders.
- In 2023, Tennant provided vocals on "Skydive" by UK rapper Casisdead.
- In June 2024, Tennant appeared on the Michael Berkeley album Collaborations, singing "Zero Hour", a song about Ukraine for which Tennant also wrote the lyrics.
- In August 2024, Tennant recited spoken-word lyrics of the song "Why?" by Bronski Beat on a remix by Superchumbo for the 40th anniversary edition of The Age of Consent.
- In April 2025, a collaboration between Tennant and composer Mark Springer titled Sleep of Reason was released. Tennant wrote the lyrics for a quintet for voice and strings, which he sang with the Sacconi Quartet.
- In July 2025, Tennant provided vocals on the track "Sunshine on Catford" on Kae Tempest's fifth studio album Self Titled.

=== Books ===
- One Hundred Lyrics and a Poem (2018) – a collection of Pet Shop Boys' lyrics and song-by-song commentaries.

== Personal life ==
Tennant came out as gay in a 1994 interview in Attitude magazine. Otherwise he remains quiet about his personal and romantic life, preferring to be a "man of mystery", as he states it. He maintains a house in London. He owned a house in Weardale, County Durham, but has since sold it. He and Lowe also have an apartment in Berlin.

Tennant has been a patron of the Elton John AIDS Foundation. In 1998, Tennant was named in a list of the biggest private financial donors to the Labour Party. However, in the 2005 general election he voted for the Liberal Democrats, citing disillusionment with Labour's ID card scheme. The Pet Shop Boys agreed to personal appeals by then-Mayor of London Boris Johnson and then-Prime Minister David Cameron, both prominent Conservative Party politicians, for the group to play at the "winners' parade" taking place shortly after the 2012 Summer Olympics closing ceremony. Enjoying the event's atmosphere and how their stage presence turned into a well-received performance, Tennant subsequently texted Cameron's staff urging Cameron to use gay scientist Alan Turing's centenary year as impetus for the UK Government to formally pardon Turing. The formal pardon was issued on 24 December 2013, with the related official paperwork signed by Queen Elizabeth II.

Tennant has criticised ageism in the music industry, stating in 2013 that radio professionals would tell him that they want to play Pet Shop Boys songs on air, but will not because the duo, then in their 50s, were considered to be "too old".

Tennant is an art collector with interests ranging from Victorian art to queer art, including artists such as Walter Crane, Edwin Long, Simeon Solomon, Keith Vaughan, Paul P., Elijah Burgher, and Pablo Bronstein. He was on the jury for the Turner Prize in 1998.

In 2022, Tennant received an honorary Doctor of Letters from Durham University.

== See also ==
- Notable alumni of St Cuthbert's High School
