= Format (album) =

Compilation album by Pet Shop Boys
- Released: 6 February 2012
- Recorded: 1996–2009
- Genre: Synth-pop
- Length: 156:27
- Label: Parlophone
- Producer: Pet Shop Boys, various

Pet Shop Boys chronology
The Most Incredible Thing (2011)	Format (2012)	Elysium (2012)

Format is a double-disc compilation album by English synth-pop duo Pet Shop Boys released in February 2012. The album consists of B-sides from various singles released from 1996 to 2009 (Bilingual to Yes, or "Before" to "Did You See Me Coming?"). It is their second B-sides album after Alternative (1995), which collected B-sides from their first version of "Opportunities (Let's Make Lots of Money)" (1985) to "Yesterday, When I Was Mad" (1994).

== Release and promotion ==
The album was initially announced by Pet Shop Boys in an interview with the Cambridge University newspaper Varsity in November 2011. It was offered for pre-order on 19 December 2011 through the Pet Shop Boys' official website. Those who ordered the album by the end of February 2012 were entered in a prize drawing for jackets worn during the Fundamental Tour.

The release date was 6 February 2012 in the UK, but it came out earlier in various territories worldwide, including Australia, where it was released on 3 February. Format debuted at number 26 on the UK Albums Chart, selling 5,909 copies in its first week.

A microsite for Format featured exclusive interviews and song information and extracts. In a video interview, Neil Tennant and Chris Lowe discussed how songs end up as B-sides and mentioned some of their favourites. The album liner notes included an interview with the duo conducted by music journalist Jon Savage, sharing details on each of the songs.

The album title refers to the many different formats of singles over the years: from 7-inch vinyl and cassette singles; to CDs, enhanced CDs, and DVD singles; to digital downloads and bundles. The liner notes list the single formats released for each of the included B-sides.

=== Artwork ===
The cover art of Format consists of groupings of coloured lines of different lengths and widths. The lines represent the spines of the singles for each B-side in their original formats: CD, cassette, 7-inch vinyl, and 12-inch vinyl. Downloadable formats were not shown. The colours generally match the look of the original singles. For the boxset edition of Format, the sleeve for each disc had the lines corresponding to the songs it contained.

== Critical reception ==
Professional ratings
Aggregate scores
Source	Rating
Album of the Year	70
Metacritic	64
Review scores
Source	Rating
AllMusic	3.5/5 stars
Daily Express	4/5 stars
Drowned in Sound	7/10
Mixmag	4/5 stars
MusicOMH	4/5 stars

Format received generally favourable reviews from critics. The review aggregator Metacritic gave it an average score of 64 out of 100 based on five reviews, while the Album of the Year site rated it 70 based on six reviews.

According to Tom Hocknell of BBC Music: "Pet Shop Boys played a vital role in establishing the (once) standard of original, non-album flipsides with West End Girls, and continue to deliver all-new material to back their single releases. And it is here, relieved of the pressure to write hits or adhere to any album themes, that they regularly stretch their experimental wings". John Murphy of MusicOMH noted, "over a career of almost 30 years, Pet Shop Boys have always treated the noble concept of the B-side with particular love and attention", and he called Format "a fine overview of nearly 15 years worth of clever, intelligent pop music that's far too good to be consigned to B-side status".

Arwa Haider of Metro wrote: "It's true that the Pet Shop Boys' commercial power waned in the 1990s and Format feels less strident than Alternative; it's even arguable that some of these later tracks have dated more quickly... Yet the many high points are genuinely dazzling; they might not be lead singles, but they're stand-out songs and proven concert favourites". Thomas H. Green of Mixmag observed: "This is PSB at play, and, while uneven, it's jammed with delights, from the Beatles-ish 'I Didn't Get Where I Am Today' and mellow d'n'b ballad 'Betrayed', to sassy Hispanic groove 'Between Two Islands' and the self-referencing aceness of 'We're The Pet Shop Boys'". Len Lukowski of Drowned in Sound concluded, "there's no denying Format was made by pop geniuses; maybe pop geniuses being slightly hit and miss, but that's still pretty good".

Simon Gage of the Daily Express stated, "If more artistes' A-sides were half as good as Pet Shop Boys' B-sides the world would be a much more interesting place". Dorian Lynskey of The Guardian commented, "Is Format patchy? Of course. It has to be. But it's patchy in a joyous, liberated way, because it's OK to make mistakes on a B-side. Nobody will hold it against you. And when you get it right it feels like a gesture of supreme confidence. You threw away a song this good on a B-side? Wow".

== Track listing ==
All tracks are written by Neil Tennant and Chris Lowe, except "We're the Pet Shop Boys", written by My Robot Friend, and "Screaming", written by Chris Lowe, Neil Tennant, and Tom Stephan.

Disc one: 1996–2002
No.	Title	A-side	Length
1.	"The Truck-Driver and His Mate"	"Before" (Note: Also included on Bilingual: Further Listening 1995–1997)	3:34
2.	"Hit and Miss"	"Before"	4:07
3.	"In the Night (1995)"	"Before"	4:16
4.	"Betrayed"	"Se a vida é (That's the Way Life Is)"	5:19
5.	"How I Learned to Hate Rock-and-Roll"	"Se a vida é (That's the Way Life Is)"	4:38
6.	"Discoteca" (new version)	"Single-Bilingual"	3:43
7.	"The Calm Before the Storm"	"Single-Bilingual"	2:46
8.	"Confidential" (demo for Tina Turner)	"Single-Bilingual" (Note: Also included on Very: Further Listening 1992–1994)	4:47
9.	"The Boy Who Couldn't Keep His Clothes On" (International Club Mix)	"A Red Letter Day" (Note: Also included on Bilingual: Special Edition)	6:05
10.	"Delusions of Grandeur"	"A Red Letter Day"	5:04
11.	"The View from Your Balcony"	"Somewhere"	3:45
12.	"Disco Potential"	"Somewhere"	4:07
13.	"Silver Age"	"I Don't Know What You Want But I Can't Give It Any More" (Note: Also included on Nightlife: Further Listening 1996–2000) (Note: Also included on Nightlife Extra (US))	3:33
14.	"Screaming"	"I Don't Know What You Want But I Can't Give It Any More"	4:56
15.	"The Ghost of Myself"	"New York City Boy"	4:03
16.	"Casting a Shadow"	"New York City Boy"	4:37
17.	"Lies"	"You Only Tell Me You Love Me When You're Drunk"	4:39
18.	"Sexy Northerner"	"Home and Dry" (Note: Also included on Release: Further Listening 2001–2004) (Note: Also included on Release bonus disc (US))	3:42
Total length:			77:41

Disc two: 2002–2009
No.	Title	A-side	Length
1.	"Always"	"Home and Dry"	5:03
2.	"Nightlife"	"Home and Dry"	3:53
3.	"Searching for the Face of Jesus"	"I Get Along"	3:27
4.	"Between Two Islands"	"I Get Along"	5:06
5.	"Friendly Fire"	"I Get Along"	3:23
6.	"We're the Pet Shop Boys"	"Miracles"	4:55
7.	"Transparent"	"Miracles"	3:51
8.	"I Didn't Get Where I Am Today"	"Flamboyant"	3:37
9.	"The Resurrectionist"	"I'm with Stupid" (Note: Also included on Fundamental: Further Listening 2005–2007)	3:10
10.	"Girls Don't Cry"	"I'm with Stupid"	2:34
11.	"In Private" (7-inch mix; duet with Elton John)	"Minimal"	4:11
12.	"Blue on Blue"	"Minimal"	3:12
13.	"No Time for Tears" (7-inch mix)	"Minimal" (Note: Original included on Battleship Potemkin)	3:35
14.	"Bright Young Things"	"Numb"	4:55
15.	"Party Song"	"Numb"	3:40
16.	"We're All Criminals Now"	"Love etc." (Note: Also included on Yes: Further Listening 2008–2010)	3:55
17.	"Gin and Jag"	"Love etc."	4:29
18.	"After the Event"	"Did You See Me Coming?"	5:16
19.	"The Former Enfant Terrible"	"Did You See Me Coming?"	2:51
20.	"Up and Down"	"Did You See Me Coming?"	3:43
Total length:			78:46

== Personnel ==
- Neil Tennant
- Chris Lowe

Producers

- Pet Shop Boys – all tracks
- Danny Tenaglia – disc 1: track 9
- David Morales – disc 2: track 2
- Craig Armstrong – disc 2: track 5
- Chris Zippel – disc 2: tracks 6 and 14
- Stuart Crichton – disc 2: track 11
- Sven Helbig – disc 2: track 13

Guest musicians

- Pete Gleadall – programming on all tracks except disc 1: tracks 7 and 9; disc 2: tracks 6, 14, 16–20; additional programming and vocals on disc 2: track 18
- Sylvia Mason-James – additional vocals on disc 1: tracks 1 and 3
- Katie Kissoon, Davide Giovannini, Joseph De Jesus, Weston Foster and Lino Rocha – additional vocals on disc 1: track 6
- Peter Daou – keyboards on disc 1: track 9
- Louie "Balo" Guzman and Danny Tenaglia – drum programming on disc 1: track 9
- Vanessa Ichak – banji girl vocals on disc 1: track 9
- Tom Stephan – additional keyboards on disc 1: track 14
- Mark Bates – piano on disc 1: track 14
- Jody Linscott – percussion on disc 2: tracks 1, 3, 4 & 8
- Joey Mosk – programming on disc 2: track 2
- Johnny Marr – guitars on disc 2: tracks 3, 4 and 8
- Craig Armstrong – orchestral arrangement on disc 2: track 5
- Steve Walters – bass swoops on disc 2: track 8
- Elton John – guest vocals on disc 2: track 11
- Torsten Rasch – orchestration on disc 2: track 13
- Dave Clayton – additional keyboards and programming on disc 2: track 13
- Chris Zippel – programming on disc 2: track 14

Artwork

- Mark Farrow – design, art direction

== Charts ==
Chart (2012)	Peak position
Austrian Albums (Ö3 Austria)	73
Belgian Heatseekers Albums (Ultratop Flanders)	9
Belgian Heatseekers Albums (Ultratop Wallonia)	1
Croatian International Albums (HDU)	19
Czech Albums (ČNS IFPI)	24
Dutch Albums (Album Top 100)	82
German Albums (Offizielle Top 100)	31
Irish Albums (IRMA)	67
Italian Albums (FIMI)	93
Scottish Albums (OCC)	38
Spanish Albums (Promusicae)	43
Swedish Albums (Sverigetopplistan)	33
Swiss Albums (Schweizer Hitparade)	52
UK Albums (OCC)	26
