= A Red Letter Day =

1997 single by Pet Shop Boys

Single by Pet Shop Boys

from the album Bilingual
- B-side: "The Boy Who Couldn't Keep His Clothes On"; "Delusions of Grandeur"
- Released: 17 March 1997
- Studio: State House of Broadcasting and Sound Recording (Moscow) (Note: Choir recording)
- Genre: Eurodance
- Length: 5:09 (album version); 4:34 (single mix)
- Label: Parlophone
- Songwriters: Neil Tennant; Chris Lowe
- Producer: Pet Shop Boys

Pet Shop Boys singles chronology
"Single-Bilingual" (1996)	"A Red Letter Day" (1997)	"Somewhere" (1997)

Music video
- "A Red Letter Day" on YouTube

"A Red Letter Day" is a song by English synth-pop duo Pet Shop Boys, released on 17 March 1997 as the fourth single from their sixth studio album, Bilingual (1996). It debuted at number nine on the UK Singles Chart but fell straight out of the top 40 to number 42 the following week. At the time, it was the highest-charting single to last only one week in the top 40. (Note: The following year the single "My Weakness Is None of Your Business" (1998) from Embrace fell from number 9 to 44 in one week.)

== Background and composition ==
"A Red Letter Day" originated as an experiment to write a song using the chord progression from Beethoven's "Ode to Joy". The single's B-side "Delusions of Grandeur" is similarly based on Moonlight Sonata.

In keeping with the international theme of Bilingual, Neil Tennant traveled to Russia to record a choir from the Choral Academy of Moscow for the track. The choir was supplemented using the Hallelujah sample library from Best Service to give it a bigger sound. Barbara Tucker, Karen Bernod, and Carole Sylvan also provided backing vocals.

A red letter day is a term for a special day, derived from the use of red ink to mark important dates on calendars. In the song, the red letter day is when someone says, "I love you".

Pet Shop Boys decided to work with Steve Rodway, known as Motiv 8, after they had enjoyed Gina G's hit single "Ooh Aah... Just a Little Bit" (1996), which he co-wrote and produced. Motiv 8 did a remix of "A Red Letter Day" and also reworked the song for the single by making the bassline follow the chords and adding a synth line that he had used in his remix.

== Release ==
"A Red Letter Day" was the last single from Bilingual, released on 17 March 1997. It was the duo's 30th hit in the UK, entering the chart at number nine. Music Week chart analyst Alan Jones described the single falling "dramatically" to number 42 the following week as part of "The constant 'revolving door' that is the top end of the singles chart … consigning most of one week's high new entries to become the following week's big droppers". He attributed this trend to large retailers like Woolworths and Asda offering discounted prices for the first week of release, whereas previously only independent and specialty stores had done so.

To promote the single, Pet Shop Boys appeared on the ITV programme This Morning on 12 March for an interview with hosts Richard and Judy. The duo also made an appearance on Top of the Pops at the end of the month.

In the United States, "A Red Letter Day" was released as a double A-side with the Pet Shop Boys version of "Somewhere" from West Side Story, which had been a non-album single in the UK. The US maxi-single, issued by Atlantic Records, entered the Maxi-Singles Sales chart at number 10 on 15 November 1997 and peaked at number eight the following week.

=== Artwork ===
The Parlophone single was released in two CD versions and on 12-inch red vinyl. CD2 came in a slipcase that could hold both singles. The slipcase and the vinyl outer sleeve were solid red embossed with red lettering. The inner sleeves and the CD1 cover (pictured) featured photos of the duo on All Saints Road near Sarm West Studios taken by Pennie Smith.

The Atlantic double A-side single uses elements of the UK "Somewhere" single, including a typeface created by Mark Farrow based on the Princeton font, and photos of the duo, taken by Andy Earl, in a layout showing half their faces.

== Critical reception ==
Dominic Pride from Music & Media wrote, "The fourth single from the Bilingual album is more of a by-numbers affair than previous singles Bilingual and Se A Vida E, which relied on epic off-beat percussion for their appeal. It's a formula which has resulted in continent-wide hits for Tennant & Lowe before—their understated use of strings and simple club rhythms has been the defining sound of Europe for much of the last decade. Strangely, the hook comes on the first part of the chorus, leading many to think this is called All I Want."

== Music video ==
One of the queues in the video

The video shows the duo and numerous extras in long queues, referencing the refrain "I'm always waiting", which are shown to variously end at a phone box, ice cream van, sunbed and finally Beachy Head cliff. It was directed by Howard Greenhalgh and filmed on the South Bank in London and in Hackney Marshes. Chris Lowe called it "the worst video of our career".

== Live performances ==
Pet Shop Boys staged a performance of the song on Top of the Pops on 28 March 1997, which was later included on the DVD with their compilation album Ultimate (2010). The song was performed on the Release Tour in 2002.

== Track listings ==
- UK and European CD1
1. "A Red Letter Day" – 4:33
2. "The Boy Who Couldn't Keep His Clothes On" – 5:44
3. "Delusions of Grandeur" – 5:02
4. "A Red Letter Day" (Moscow mix) – 5:38
- UK and European CD2
1. "A Red Letter Day" (Trouser Autoerotic Decapitation mix) – 10:04
2. "A Red Letter Day" (Motiv 8 twelve-inch Master mix) – 6:58
3. "A Red Letter Day" (Basement Jaxx vocal mix) – 6:50
4. "A Red Letter Day" (PSB extended edit) – 5:38
5. "A Red Letter Day" (Trouser Enthusiasts Congo Dongo Dubstramental) – 8:06
- UK 12-inch single

A1. "A Red Letter Day" (Basement Jaxx Nite dub) – 6:07
A2. "A Red Letter Day" (Trouser Enthusiasts Congo Dongo Dubstramental) – 8:06
B1. "The Boy Who Couldn't Keep His Clothes On" (the Far Away dub) – 8:56

- Australian CD single
1. "A Red Letter Day" – 4:33
2. "The Boy Who Couldn't Keep His Clothes On" – 5:44
3. "Delusions of Grandeur" – 5:02
4. "A Red Letter Day" (Trouser Autoerotic Decapitation mix) – 10:04
5. "A Red Letter Day" (Motiv 8 twelve-inch Master mix) – 6:58

== Personnel ==
Personnel are adapted from the Bilingual: Further Listening 1995–1997 liner notes and Catalogue (2006).

Pet Shop Boys

- Chris Lowe
- Neil Tennant

Additional musicians

- The Choral Academy of Moscow – choir
- Victor Popov – choir director
- Alyosha Zolotukhin – choir arrangement
- Barbara Tucker – backing vocals
- Karen Bernod – backing vocals
- Carole Sylvan – backing vocals
- Pete Gleadall – programming

Technical personnel

- Pet Shop Boys – production
- Steve Rodway/Motiv 8 – additional production (single version)
- Bob Kraushaar – engineering, mixing (album version)
- Mike "Spike" Drake – mixing (single version)
- Tatyana Vinnitskaya – choir recording
- Graeme Perkins – choir coordination

Artwork

- Farrow Design – design
- Pennie Smith – photography
- Flavio Cecchetto – photography
- Andy Earl – photography (US version)

== Charts ==
Weekly chart performance for "A Red Letter Day"
Chart (1997)	Peak position
Australia (ARIA)	57
Belgium (Ultratip Bubbling Under Flanders)	13
Czech Republic (IFPI ČR)	5
Europe (Eurochart Hot 100 Singles)	56
Europe Airplay (European Hit Radio)	9
Finland (Suomen virallinen lista)	18
Germany (GfK)	55
Scotland Singles (Official Charts)	11
Sweden (Sverigetopplistan)	30
UK Singles (Official Charts)	9
US Dance Singles Sales (Billboard) with "Somewhere"	8
