= Before (song) =

1996 single by Pet Shop Boys

Single by Pet Shop Boys

from the album Bilingual
- B-side: "The Truck-Driver and His Mate"; "Hit and Miss"; "In the Night '95"
- Written: June 1995
- Released: 22 April 1996
- Recorded: June 1995
- Studio: Bass Hit, Axis (New York City)
- Genre: Disco; house; electropop; synth-pop
- Length: 4:32
- Label: Parlophone; Atlantic
- Songwriters: Neil Tennant; Chris Lowe
- Producers: Pet Shop Boys; Danny Tenaglia

Pet Shop Boys singles chronology
"Paninaro '95" (1995)	"Before" (1996)	"Se a vida é (That's the Way Life Is)" (1996)

Music video
- "Before" on YouTube

"Before" is a song by English synth-pop duo Pet Shop Boys, released on 22 April 1996 by Parlophone and Atlantic Records as the lead single from their sixth studio album, Bilingual (1996). Upon its release, the single peaked at number seven on the UK Singles Chart, number two in Israel, number four in Finland, and number one in Hungary. In the United States, it topped the Billboard Dance Club Play chart. The accompanying music video was directed by Howard Greenhalgh.

== Background and recording ==
"Before" was written and recorded in New York City in June 1995. Pet Shop Boys' intention was to make a song for the American market. Their original plan was to work with David Morales, but he canceled after the studio had been booked. (Note: Pet Shop Boys eventually worked with Morales on "New York City Boy" (1999).) Danny Tenaglia agreed to produce the track on short notice. Barbara Tucker, Karen Bernod, and Carole Sylvan sang backing vocals, and Peter Daou played keyboards.

Lyricist Neil Tennant described "Before" as a love song and "a song of encouragement". He compared it to "Love Comes Quickly" (1986), addressed to someone who had experienced romantic disappointment.

== Release ==
"Before" preceded the album's September release, issued on 22 April 1996 by Parlophone. It was Pet Shop Boys' 26th hit single, debuting at number seven on the UK Singles Chart the week of 4 May. The song was in rotation on 67 radio stations in 19 countries across Europe in May, and it reached number five on the Airplay 100 chart in the UK.

The CD1 single featured two new songs, "The Truck-Driver and His Mate" and "Hit and Miss", as well as a new instrumental version of the 1985 song "In the Night", remixed for use as the theme song of the BBC One programme The Clothes Show. (Note: "In the Night '95" had also been a B-side to "Paninaro '95" the previous year.) A second CD single featured five remixes of "Before": the Classic Paradise mix and the Aphrodisiac mix by Love to Infinity; the Hed Boys mix and the extended mix by Dave Lee (aka Joey Negro) and Andrew Livingstone; and a remix by the song's producer, Danny Tenaglia.

In the United States, a different set of remixes was released on 12-inch double vinyl on 17 June and as a CD maxi-single in July. An enhanced CD contained bonus multimedia content, including the music video, song lyrics, and photos.

"Before" was Pet Shop Boys' debut on their new American label, Atlantic Records. At the time, Pet Shop Boys continued to perform well on the dance charts, but radio airplay had declined in the US. Atlantic launched a marketing campaign to promote the single through both club and radio play. In July, the radio edit of "Before" was sent to contemporary hit radio, alternative, and campus radio stations. The college stations also received a recorded interview of Tennant conducted by Stephin Merritt.

In May, Atlantic's gay marketing division promoted "Before" with launch parties at gay nightclubs paired with local advertising in Minneapolis, Houston, New York, San Francisco, and Chicago, where Pet Shop Boys had previous commercial success. Prior to the US release, 300 import copies of the 12-inch single were sent to club DJs, with a third of them going to gay clubs. "Before" reached number one on Billboard magazine's Dance Club Play chart. It also peaked at number seven on both the Maxi-Singles Sales and the Bubbling Under Hot 100 charts.

=== Artwork ===
The photos of the duo on the single sleeves were done by Brad Branson, using a solarization technique. Designer Mark Farrow applied spot varnish to enhance the effect. CD1 (pictured) showed Neil Tennant and CD2 featured Chris Lowe.

The sleeve of the UK promotional 12-inch vinyl of "Before" used a photo showing male nudity from a book by artist Richard Prince. It was intended as a humorous representation of "before arousal". The image was used in duplicate on promotional copies of "The Truck-Driver and His Mate".

== Critical reception ==
Larry Flick from Billboard magazine described the song as "a tasteful blend of electro-pop and retro-disco", and a "vigorous and appealing house shuffler". He also noted that it "rides the act's familiar flair for clever lyrics and smooth melodies". Victoria Segal of Melody Maker called it "steeped in standard Petties loser-in-love-and-therefore-in-life melancholy, all panpipes and high-pitched female vocals, a sort of thick sadness curdling Neil Tennant's voice". She noted that the B-side "The Truck-Driver and His Mate" was the "killer track", with its "filthiest beat", "synthesised sighs" and Tennant's "voice all over it". James Hamilton from Music Week's RM Dance Update noted its "gentle cooing".

== Music video ==
The music video for "Before" was directed by British director Howard Greenhalgh.

== Track listings ==
- UK CD1 and Australian CD single
1. "Before" – 4:05
2. "The Truck-Driver and His Mate" – 3:33
3. "Hit and Miss" – 4:05
4. "In the Night 1995" – 4:17
- UK CD2
1. "Before" (Classic Paradise mix) – 7:56
2. "Before" (Aphrodisiac mix) – 7:27
3. "Before" (Hed Boys mix) – 7:33
4. "Before" (extended mix) – 8:47
5. "Before" (Danny Tenaglia mix) – 7:17
- UK and Australian cassette single; European CD single
1. "Before" – 4:05
2. "The Truck-Driver and His Mate" – 3:33
- UK 3×12-inch single

A1. "Before" (Underground mix) – 7:17
A2. "Before" (bonus dub) – 4:03
B1. "Before" (Underground instrumental) – 7:17
B2. "Before" (bonus beats) – 4:03
C1. "Before" (Classic Paradise mix) – 7:56
D1. "Before" (Aphrodisiac mix) – 7:27
E1. "Before" (Hed Boys mix) – 7:33
E2. "Before" (Hed Boys dub) – 4:55
F1. "Before" (Joey Negro extended mix) – 8:47

- US CD single
1. "Before" (album version) – 4:05
2. "The Truck-Driver and His Mate" – 3:33
3. "Hit and Miss" – 4:05
4. "Before" (video)
- US maxi-CD single
1. "Before" (album version) – 4:05
2. "Before" (D.T.'s After mix) – 8:46
3. "Before" (Classic Paradise mix—Love to Infinity) – 7:56
4. "Before" (Joey Negro's Hed Boys mix) – 7:35
5. "Before" (Joey Negro's Before dub) – 4:55
6. "Before" (Tenaglia's Underground mix) – 7:17
7. "Before" (Tenaglia's bonus beats) – 4:03
8. "Before" (D.T.'s Twilo dub) – 8:57
9. "Before" (Tenaglia's Bonus dub) – 4:03
- US 2×12-inch single

A1. "Before" (D.T.'s After mix) – 8:46
A2. "Before" (Tenaglia's Bonus dub) – 4:03
B1. "Before" (Classic Paradise mix—Love to Infinity) – 7:56
B2. "Before" (Tenaglia's bonus beats) – 4:03
C1. "Before" (Joey Negro's Hed Boys mix) – 7:35
C2. "Before" (Joey Negro's Before dub) – 4:55
D1. "Before" (Tenaglia's Underground mix) – 7:17
D2. "Before" (D.T.'s Twilo dub) – 8:57

- US cassette single
1. "Before" (album version) – 4:05
2. "The Truck-Driver and His Mate" – 3:33
3. "Hit and Miss" – 4:05

== Personnel ==
Personnel are adapted from the liner notes of Bilingual: Further Listening 1995–1997 and Before.

Pet Shop Boys

- Chris Lowe
- Neil Tennant

Additional musicians

- Danny Tenaglia – drum programming
- Louie 'Balo' Guzman – drum programming
- Peter Daou – keyboards
- Phil Pagano – programming
- Barbara Tucker – backing vocals
- Karen Bernod – backing vocals
- Carole Sylvan – backing vocals

Technical personnel

- Pet Shop Boys – production
- Danny Tenaglia – production
- Dana Vlcek – recording and mix engineer
- Rob Rives – assistant engineer

Artwork

- Farrow Design – design
- Brad Branson – photography

== Charts ==
=== Weekly charts ===
Weekly chart performance for "Before"
Chart (1996)	Peak position
Australia (ARIA)	25
Austria (Ö3 Austria Top 40)	38
Canada Top Singles (RPM)	79
Canada Dance/Urban (RPM)	19
Europe (Eurochart Hot 100 Singles)	29
Finland (Suomen virallinen lista)	4
Germany (GfK)	45
Hungary (MAHASZ)	1
Iceland (Íslenski Listinn Topp 40)	38
Israel (Israeli Singles Chart)	2
Italy (Musica e dischi)	16
Netherlands (Dutch Top 40 Tipparade)	2
Netherlands (Single Top 100 Tipparade)	4
Scottish Singles Sales (Official Charts)	8
Sweden (Sverigetopplistan)	10
Switzerland (Schweizer Hitparade)	31
UK Singles (Official Charts)	7
US Bubbling Under Hot 100 (Billboard)	7
US Dance Club Songs (Billboard)	1
US Dance Singles Sales (Billboard)	7

=== Year-end charts ===
Year-end chart performance for "Before"
Chart (1996)	Position
US Dance Club Play (Billboard)	37

== Release history ==
Release dates and formats for "Before"
Region	Date	Format(s)	Label(s)	Ref.
United Kingdom	22 April 1996	CD; cassette	Parlophone	
United Kingdom	20 May 1996	3×12-inch vinyl	Parlophone	
United States	17 June 1996	12-inch vinyl	Atlantic	
United States	17 July 1996	Enhanced CD	Atlantic	
United States	23 July 1996	Rhythmic contemporary; contemporary hit radio	Atlantic	
