= Nightlife (Pet Shop Boys album) =

Studio album by Pet Shop Boys
- Released: 8 October 1999
- Recorded: 1998–1999
- Studios: Swanyard (London) (Note: Tracks 1, 7 and 9); AIR (London) (Note: Strings on tracks 2, 5, 6, 8, 10 and 12); Sarm West (London) (Note: Tracks 2, 5, 6, 8, 10 and 12); Quad (New York City) (Note: Tracks 3 and 11); Metropolis (London) (Note: Track 4)
- Genres: Synth-pop; dance-pop; trance; disco
- Length: 52:02
- Label: Parlophone
- Producers: Craig Armstrong; David Morales; Pet Shop Boys; Rollo

Pet Shop Boys chronology
Essential (1998)	Nightlife (1999)	Release (2002)

Singles from Nightlife
- 1. "I Don't Know What You Want but I Can't Give It Any More" Released: 19 July 1999; 2. "New York City Boy" Released: 22 September 1999; 3. "You Only Tell Me You Love Me When You're Drunk" Released: 3 January 2000

Nightlife is the seventh studio album by English synth-pop duo Pet Shop Boys, released on 8 October 1999 by EMI in Germany and Japan and on 11 October 1999 by Parlophone in the UK. After the release and promotion of their previous album, Bilingual (1996), Pet Shop Boys started work with playwright Jonathan Harvey on the stage musical that eventually became Closer to Heaven; at one stage during the writing process, the musical was given the name Nightlife. Pet Shop Boys soon had an album's worth of tracks and decided to release the album Nightlife as a concept album and in order to showcase some of the songs that would eventually make it into the musical.

The album incorporates a variety of musical influences, including trance on the Rollo-produced "For Your Own Good" and "Radiophonic"; dance-pop on "Closer to Heaven" and "I Don't Know What You Want but I Can't Give It Any More"; disco pastiche on "New York City Boy"; and country music on "You Only Tell Me You Love Me When You're Drunk". The track "Happiness Is an Option" is based on Sergei Rachmaninoff's classical piece Vocalise, Op. 34, No. 14.

As of May 2001, the album had sold 1.2 million copies worldwide. It reached number seven on the UK Albums Chart (their first studio album not to reach the top five) and spent three weeks on the chart at the time, later re-entering at number 29 following the album's Further Listening 1996–2000 reissue in 2017. It also became the duo's lowest-charting studio album in the United States up to that point, reaching number 84 on the Billboard 200.

== Background and composition ==
Written in conjunction with Closer to Heaven, Nightlife features three songs that are also in the musical: the title song, "Closer to Heaven"; "Vampires"; and "In Denial", a duet between a gay father and his daughter, performed on the album by Neil Tennant and Kylie Minogue. Album tracks that were considered but not used for the musical are "For Your Own Good", "The Only One", and "You Only Tell Me You Love Me When You're Drunk". A song called "Nightlife" was originally intended for both the musical and the album but was not released until 2002 as a bonus track to the single "Home and Dry" from Pet Shop Boys' next album, Release. The remaining songs on Nightlife are unrelated to the musical.

The album explores "the good and bad things about nightlife. The excitement, the fantasy, the thrill, but also the abuse, the exploitation", according to Tennant. He compared the theme to that of Frank Sinatra's 1955 album In the Wee Small Hours, which Tennant described as having songs that deal with relationship dramas happening at night when perceptions are altered or exaggerated. On Nightlife, the opening track, "For Your Own Good", is sung from the perspective of a woman whose lover goes out clubbing every night, and by the closing track, "Footsteps", he has not returned. In between are songs touching on other aspects of nightlife, like vampires and disco.

== Recording ==
Pet Shop Boys initially approached Brian Eno to produce the album, but after a trial run nothing came of it. The duo then decided to use three different producers on Nightlife. The recording process began in April 1998.

Craig Armstrong produced six tracks: "Closer to Heaven", "You Only Tell Me You Love Me When You're Drunk", "Vampires", "The Only One", "In Denial", and "Footsteps". They worked on the songs at Armstrong's studio in Glasgow, with recording done at Sarm West in London. Armstrong was chosen in part for his background as a composer to work particularly on the tracks associated with the musical. He wrote orchestrations for all six songs, performed by The London Session Orchestra at AIR studios. The Metro Voices choir sang on "In Denial" and "Footsteps", and B. J. Cole played pedal steel guitar on the country-flavoured "You Only Tell Me You Love Me When You're Drunk".

Rollo was selected to add a club music vibe to the album. He produced three tracks—"For Your Own Good", "Radiophonic", and "Boy Strange"—at Swanyard Studios in London. Pet Shop Boys went to New York City to work with American DJ David Morales on the singles "I Don't Know What You Want but I Can't Give It Any More" and "New York City Boy" at Quad Studios.

Pet Shop Boys produced "Happiness Is an Option" themselves at Metropolis in London. They added the song late in the process in an attempt to write a single for their new American label, Sire Records, though it was not used as such in the end. Kate St John played oboe and Sylvia Mason-James sang backing vocals on the song, which is based on Rachmaninoff's Vocalise.

== Release ==
In June 1999, Tennant and Lowe conducted over 130 media interviews with local and international press during a week of promotion for Nightlife at St Pancras Chambers in London; and in August, they attended a launch party for their album and the Nightlife Tour at the Popkomm music industry trade show in Cologne, Germany. The album was preceded by two singles, "I Don't Know What You Want but I Can't Give It Any More" in July and "New York City Boy" in September. Both reached the top 20 at number 15 and number 14, respectively.

Nightlife sold 17,000 copies in the UK the first week after its release on 11 October 1999, debuting at number seven on the UK Albums Chart. Music Week chart analyst Alan Jones called the album's performance "significantly lower than could have been expected" given the relative success of the singles and that of Pet Shop Boys' previous album, Bilingual (1996), which had charted at number four. Nightlife placed 288th in the 1999 album rankings, with fewer than 38,000 sales. The album received a gold BPI certification signifying 100,000 sales the following year.

Internationally, Nightlife achieved its best chart position in Germany, where it debuted at number two, and it was certified gold by BVMI with sales of at least 150,000. It was a top ten album in Sweden, Denmark, Spain, and Switzerland, and it reached number three on the European Top 100 Albums chart. Nightlife charted at number 11 in Canada and at number 12 in Japan, where it earned a gold certification with at least 100,000 sales.

In the lead-up to Nightlife, Pet Shop Boys were dropped by their American label, Atlantic Records, and were subsequently signed to Sire Records by Seymour Stein. On the US charts, Nightlife peaked at number 84 on the Billboard 200, and it reached number 13 on the Top Internet Album Sales chart. US sales had totaled 139,000 as of 2006.

A limited-edition two-CD set of Nightlife was released in the United States. The bonus disc, titled Nightlife Extra, contained all the B-sides from the UK releases of the singles "I Don't Know What You Want but I Can't Give It Any More" and "New York City Boy", as well as remixes of these singles, some of which were only available in the US on promotional releases.

In 2017, the album was reissued as Nightlife: Further Listening 1996–2000. The new version was digitally remastered and came with two bonus discs of B-sides and previously unreleased material from around the time of the album's original release, including demos of a number of songs associated with the musical, Closer to Heaven. The reissue reentered the UK Albums Chart for one week at number 29. In the US, Nightlife: Further Listening placed at number 17 on the Billboard Top Dance/Electronic Albums chart and reentered the Internet Albums chart at number 20, selling around 2,000 copies the week of its release, with half of those purchased online.

== Visuals ==
For the promotion of the album, the band adopted a stark new appearance, designed in consultation with theatre designer Ian MacNeil. Now, the duo ubiquitously appeared wearing thick, dark eyebrows, inspired by Kabuki theatre; yellow or orange wigs in a variety of hairstyles, inspired by the punk subculture (especially several spiked wigs); and black sunglasses. This was supported by a series of outfits in dark, muted colours, the most deviant of which incorporated culottes, inspired by the attire of samurai, instead of trousers. Photographs involving the costumes were often set in urban environments; the former Midland Grand Hotel in Kings Cross, London was used as the setting to debut the look. The album cover image (pictured) was taken by American photographer Alexei Hay on the New York City Subway, with the duo's heads blurred, giving an impression of motion. The costumes were also used for promotional photographs, the album liner notes, all the single covers, as well as the Nightlife Tour.

The music video for "I Don't Know What You Want But I Can't Give It Any More" showed Tennant and Lowe being transformed into their new appearances, though in a fantastical manner: they are operated on by medical laboratory machines, then covered in talcum powder and dressed by monks in a ritual-like manner. Finally, they are given dogs on leashes and released into a "different world", where everyone else is also dressed in exactly the same way. Conceptualised among the band members, MacNeil, and director Pedro Romhanyi, the video was created to showcase the costumes. It was visually influenced by the films THX 1138 (1971) in the initial transformation sequence (copying many of its shots and props precisely); Ridicule (1996), in the ritualistic dressing-up scene; 2001: A Space Odyssey (1968), in the decor of the living room with an illuminated floor; and A Clockwork Orange (1971), in the outdoor urban setting.

According to Tennant, the costumes helped him to distance himself from the songs, adding to the impersonal nature of Nightlife. In other interviews, he explained that they played into his belief in the need for pop stars to have "bigger than life" public images, and were a reaction against the "naturalistic" look of the 1990s.

== Critical reception ==
Professional ratings
Review scores
Source	Rating
AllMusic	3/5 stars
Entertainment Weekly	B+
The Guardian	3/5 stars
NME	2/5 stars
Pitchfork	3.2/10
Release Magazine	8/10
Rolling Stone	3/5 stars
Spin	8/10
The Village Voice	A−

Nightlife received mixed reviews from critics. Stephen Thomas Erlewine of AllMusic called the album "...a clever, skillful updating of classic disco, highlighted by small contemporary dance flourishes, and infused with a true sense of wit, sophistication, and intelligence. Pet Shop Boys do this music better than anyone else ever has, and they're at the top of their form here, but it's hard to shake the initial impression that they've done this before". Music Week likewise commented, "The presence of Faithless's Rollo may have upped the dance factor, but otherwise this is very much business as usual for the PSBs... All good stuff, but seven studio albums in, it may take something more daring to reawaken the wider public's interest". In a 3-star review for The Guardian, Adam Sweeting noted: "There are signs here that the Boys are finally outgrowing their clubland roots. While the Kraftwerk-esque Radiophonic demands robotic treatment, several songs have a melodic and harmonic sophistication which cries out to be cut loose from the tyranny of drum machine and sequencer, especially the exquisite You Only Tell Me You Love Me…"

In a review for BBC News, Chris Charles suggested that Pet Shop Boys "were, by the turn of the century, a spent force" and said of the album, "Sure, there are sprinklings of magic dust within Nightlife that briefly raise expectations. [...] You only have to hear the singles for the broader, inferior picture". Paul Cooper of Pitchfork described the album as "a mush of half-arsed trance, lyrics worthy of a late-middle-aged romance authoress and misguided R&B". NME called Nightlife "the sound of the sun plummeting on the musical magic of the greatest melancholic-disco duo this country's ever known; trying too hard and not trying hard enough, bereft of their wit, insight and energy, beyond a parody's parody into complete insignificance, flailing in the quicksand of 'Will this do?'"

Rob Bolton of Exclaim! called Nightlife "one of their best efforts to date". In a review for Salon.com, Charles Taylor observed, "There's real poignancy in Pet Shop Boys' juxtaposition of music that calls up a youthful past with an adult state of mind". Rating Nightlife 8 out of 10, Barry Walters of Spin wrote: "These Pet Shop men are the rare career act able to turn DJ aesthetics into consistently fruitful pop. [...] the dancey bits here are clubbier, and the nocturnal ballads grander than ever". Tom Lanham from Entertainment Weekly gave the album a B+, elaborating: "Neil Tennant and Chris Lowe serve sumptuous techno-pop ditties as if they were flutes full of decadent absinthe. And they do so with grace, poise, and cabaret camp". Ron Rogers of RPM wrote: "The Boys have always been among the best when it comes to slapping a catchy pop hook atop a danceable beat, and this new release confirms that fact. From the opening track, For Your Own Good, with its throbbing bassline and evocative chorus, this album just bounces along through its dozen tracks, rarely letting up for Messers Tennant and Lowe to take a breath".

Looking back at the album for the 2017 reissue, Nightlife: Further Listening 1996–2000, Ross Semple of Attitude reflected: "Notable for the Kylie duet In Denial and the camp classic New York City Boy, it's an album that's heavy on electronics and was written in tandem with the Closer To Heaven musical so it has a bit of a schizophrenic feel – veering from the thundering disco opener For Your Own Good to the beautiful melancholy of You Only Tell Me You Love Me When You're Drunk – but the play on darkness and light is really interesting".

== Concert tour ==
The Nightlife Tour in 1999–2000 was Pet Shop Boys' first world tour with shows in the UK since the Performance Tour eight years earlier. While the tour was in rehearsals, promoter Harvey Goldsmith's company went into receivership, and Pet Shop Boys lost their advance of £750,000. They decided to carry on at a loss and ended up playing in partially empty venues; during one such concert at Sheffield Arena, they briefly considered disbanding.

The tour opened in Miami on 20 October 1999 and covered North America through mid-November before returning to Europe. Pet Shop Boys played arenas in the UK in December 1999, culminating at Wembley. Tour dates in Europe included five stops in Spain and 13 total in Germany, ending in Mannheim on 12 February 2000. A summer tour in June and July 2000 included elements of the Nightlife Tour updated to suit festivals. The duo made their first appearance at the Glastonbury Festival on 24 June, playing "a showstopping set to a hugely enthusiastic crowd" according to BBC News. At Roskilde, Pet Shop Boys and Oasis refused to perform when the organisers carried on with the festival despite the deaths of nine people in a crowd crush during Pearl Jam's set.

The sets for the Nightlife Tour were designed by deconstructivist architect Zaha Hadid. The stage was modular, and could fit in differently-sized venues and be rearranged by the backing singers throughout each concert. Ian MacNeil designed the staging and costumes, featuring the wigged look he created for the album promotion.

The original backing vocalists from the single "New York City Boy"—Steve Abram, Billy Cliff, Keith Fluitt, and John James—joined the tour, along with singer Sylvia Mason-James and percussionist Danny Cummings. Tennant played acoustic guitar on "You Only Tell Me You Love Me When You're Drunk". The music director for the tour was Peter Schwartz, who had worked on the album. Describing the setlist, Jon Pareles noted: "Most of the concert versions were club-style remixes, with a booming beat and magnified sound effects". In addition to the singles from Nightlife, Pet Shop Boys played the album tracks "Happiness Is an Option", "Closer to Heaven", "Vampires", and "Footsteps".

=== Concert film ===
Montage: The Nightlife Tour was released in November 2001 on VHS and DVD by Parlophone in the UK and Europe and by Sanctuary Records in the US. The primary concert film and audio was recorded at Westfalenhallen in Dortmund, Germany, on 10 February 2000, with additional footage from concerts in Atlanta and New York. Webcasts and background scenes from the Nightlife and summer tours were also included, superimposed in a montage over the main video.

== Track listing ==
All tracks are written by Neil Tennant and Chris Lowe, except where noted.

No.	Title	Writer(s)	Producer(s)	Length
1.	"For Your Own Good"		Rollo; Pet Shop Boys	5:13
2.	"Closer to Heaven"		Craig Armstrong; Pet Shop Boys	4:06
3.	"I Don't Know What You Want but I Can't Give It Any More"		David Morales; Pet Shop Boys	5:09
4.	"Happiness Is an Option"	Tennant; Lowe; George Clinton; Sergei Rachmaninoff	Pet Shop Boys	3:48
5.	"You Only Tell Me You Love Me When You're Drunk"		Armstrong; Pet Shop Boys	3:11
6.	"Vampires"		Armstrong; Pet Shop Boys	4:43
7.	"Radiophonic"		Rollo; Pet Shop Boys	3:31
8.	"The Only One"		Armstrong; Pet Shop Boys	4:21
9.	"Boy Strange"		Rollo; Pet Shop Boys	5:09
10.	"In Denial" (duet with Kylie Minogue)		Armstrong; Pet Shop Boys	3:20
11.	"New York City Boy"	Tennant; Lowe; Morales	Morales; Pet Shop Boys	5:15
12.	"Footsteps"		Armstrong; Pet Shop Boys	4:16

=== US limited edition bonus CD ===
Nightlife Extra
No.	Title	Writer(s)	Length
1.	"The Ghost of Myself"		4:04
2.	"Casting a Shadow"		4:38
3.	"Je t'aime... moi non plus" (with Sam Taylor-Wood)	Serge Gainsbourg	4:11
4.	"Silver Age"		3:33
5.	"Screaming"	Tennant; Lowe; Tom Stephan	4:55
6.	"I Don't Know What You Want but I Can't Give It Any More" (The Morales Remix)		7:46
7.	"I Don't Know What You Want but I Can't Give It Any More" (Thee Maddkatt Courtship 80 Witness Mix)		7:38
8.	"New York City Boy" (The Superchumbo Uptown Mix)	Tennant; Lowe; Morales	9:44
9.	"New York City Boy" (The Almighty Definitive Mix)	Tennant; Lowe; Morales	6:31
10.	"New York City Boy" (The Thunderpuss 2000 Club Mix)	Tennant; Lowe; Morales	10:55
11.	"New York City Boy" (The Lange Mix)	Tennant; Lowe; Morales	7:06

=== Further Listening 1996–2000 ===
Disc two
No.	Title	Writer(s)	Length
1.	"Vampires" (demo)		4:02
2.	"For All of Us" (demo)		4:20
3.	"Call Me Old-Fashioned" (demo)		3:58
4.	"Friendly Fire"		3:23
5.	"Believe/Song for Guy" (featuring Elton John)	Elton John; Bernie Taupin	2:59
6.	"Sail Away"	Noël Coward	4:33
7.	"It Doesn't Often Snow at Christmas" (fan club mix)		3:56
8.	"Nightlife"		3:54
9.	"Playing in the Streets"		3:23
10.	"Tall Thin Men"		2:14
11.	"Radiophonic" (demo)		5:15
Total length:			41:57

Disc three
No.	Title	Writer(s)	Length
1.	"Somebody Else's Business"		3:30
2.	"Silver Age"		3:32
3.	"Screaming"		4:54
4.	"For All of Us"		4:23
5.	"The Ghost of Myself"		4:03
6.	"Casting a Shadow"		4:37
7.	"I Don't Know What You Want but I Can't Give It Any More" (The PSB Extension)		8:39
8.	"Was It Worth It?" (live)		3:05
9.	"Lies"		4:42
10.	"Paris City Boy" (Full French)	Tennant; Lowe; Morales	5:17
11.	"Positive Role Model"	Tennant; Lowe; Barry White; Anthony Sepe; Peter Sterling Radcliffe	4:03
12.	"Somebody Else's Business" (extended mix)		5:33
Total length:			56:18

== Personnel ==
Credits adapted from the liner notes of Nightlife.

- Pet Shop Boys – arrangement (tracks 2, 5, 6, 8, 10, 12)

=== Additional musicians ===
- Pete Gleadall – programming (tracks 1, 4, 7, 9); additional programming (track 3)
- Mark Bates – additional keyboards (tracks 1, 7, 9)
- Pauline Taylor – additional vocals (track 1)
- Craig Armstrong – arrangement, orchestration (tracks 2, 5, 6, 8, 10, 12); additional keyboards (tracks 2, 5, 6, 10); piano (tracks 5, 6, 8, 10); vocoder (track 8); choir arrangement (tracks 10, 12); additional piano (track 12)
- Stephen Hilton – programming, additional keyboards (tracks 2, 5, 6, 8, 10, 12)
- Richard T. Norris – programming, additional keyboards (tracks 2, 6, 12)
- Pete Lockett – percussion (tracks 2, 6, 8, 12)
- Ali MacLeod – guitar (tracks 2, 5, 6, 12)
- Peter "Ski" Schwartz – additional keyboards (tracks 2, 12); keyboards, programming, string arrangements (track 3)
- Audrey Wheeler – additional vocals (track 3)
- Sylvia Mason-James – additional vocals (track 4)
- Kate St John – oboe (track 4)
- B. J. Cole – pedal steel guitar (track 5)
- Scott J. Fraser – bass guitar (tracks 5, 6, 8, 12)
- JB Henry – additional vocals (tracks 6, 8, 12)
- Tessa Niles – additional vocals (tracks 6, 12)
- Carol Kenyon – additional vocals (tracks 6, 12)
- Malcom Hyde-Smith – percussion (track 9)
- Paul Herman – guitar (track 9)
- Andy Gangadeen – drums (track 9)
- Kylie Minogue – vocals (track 10)
- Joey Mosk – keyboard programming (track 11)
- Vincent Montana Jr. – string arrangements, horn arrangements, string conducting, horn conducting (track 11)
- Gene Perez – bass guitar (track 11)
- Carlos Gomez – percussion (track 11)
- Danny Madden – backing vocals arrangement, backing vocals conducting (track 11)
- Steve Abram – backing vocals (track 11)
- Billy Cliff – backing vocals (track 11)
- Keith Fluitt – backing vocals (track 11)
- John James – backing vocals (track 11)
- The London Session Orchestra – orchestra (tracks 2, 5, 6, 10, 12)
- Gavyn Wright – orchestra leader (tracks 2, 5, 6, 10, 12)
- Metro Voices – choir (tracks 10, 12)
- Jenny O'Grady – choir master (tracks 10, 12)
- Matt Dunkley – choir conducting (tracks 10, 12)

=== Technical ===
- Rollo – production, mixing (tracks 1, 7, 9)
- Pet Shop Boys – production (all tracks); mixing (track 11)
- Goetz – engineering (tracks 1, 7, 9); mixing (tracks 3–5, 10, 11)
- Craig Armstrong – production (tracks 2, 5, 6, 8, 10, 12)
- Andy Bradfield – engineering (tracks 2, 5, 6, 8, 10, 12)
- Mark "Spike" Stent – mixing (tracks 2, 6, 8, 12)
- Geoff Foster – strings recording (tracks 2, 5, 6, 8, 10, 12)
- David Morales – production (tracks 3, 11)
- Steven Barkan – engineering (tracks 3, 11)
- Bill Importico Jr. – engineering assistance (tracks 3, 11)
- Hugo Dwyer – strings engineering (track 3)
- Richard Lowe – engineering (track 4)
- Jon Smeltz – string and horn engineering (track 11)
- Tim Young – mastering

=== Artwork ===
- Alexei Hay – cover photography
- Eric Watson – inside photography
- Farrow Design – design
- Pet Shop Boys – design

== Charts ==
=== Weekly charts ===
Weekly chart performance for Nightlife
Chart (1999)	Peak position
Australian Albums (ARIA)	25
Austrian Albums (Ö3 Austria)	16
Belgian Albums (Ultratop Flanders)	29
Belgian Albums (Ultratop Wallonia)	41
Canada Top Albums/CDs (RPM)	11
Czech Albums (ČNS IFPI)	19
Danish Albums (Hitlisten)	9
Dutch Albums (Album Top 100)	61
European Albums (Music & Media)	3
Finnish Albums (Suomen virallinen lista)	18
French Albums (SNEP)	36
German Albums (Offizielle Top 100)	2
Hungarian Albums (MAHASZ)	22
Italian Albums (Musica e dischi)	36
Japanese Albums (Oricon)	12
Norwegian Albums (VG-lista)	16
Scottish Albums (Official Charts)	15
Spanish Albums (AFYVE)	9
Swedish Albums (Sverigetopplistan)	4
Swiss Albums (Schweizer Hitparade)	9
UK Albums (Official Charts)	7
US Billboard 200	84

Chart (2026)	Peak position
Croatian International Albums (HDU)	11

=== Year-end charts ===
Year-end chart performance for Nightlife
Chart (1999)	Position
German Albums (Offizielle Top 100)	99

== Certifications and sales ==
Certifications and sales for Nightlife
Region	Certification	Certified units/sales
Germany (BVMI)	Gold	150,000^{^}
Japan (RIAJ)	Gold	100,000^{^}
Spain (Promusicae)	Gold	50,000^{^}
United Kingdom (BPI)	Gold	100,000^{^}
United States	—	139,000
^{^} Shipments figures based on certification alone.

== Release history ==
Release history for Nightlife
Region	Date	Label	Edition	Ref.
Germany	8 October 1999	EMI	Standard	
Japan	8 October 1999	EMI	Standard	
United Kingdom	11 October 1999	Parlophone	Standard	
Canada	12 October 1999	EMI Music Canada	Standard	
United States	2 November 1999	Sire	Standard	
United States	16 November 1999	Sire	Limited	
