= You Only Tell Me You Love Me When You're Drunk =

2000 single by Pet Shop Boys

Single by Pet Shop Boys

from the album Nightlife
- B-side: "Lies"; "Sail Away"
- Released: 3 January 2000
- Studio: Sarm West (London, England); AIR (London, England) (Note: Strings recording)
- Genre: Synth-pop; electro; country
- Length: 3:09
- Label: Parlophone
- Songwriters: Neil Tennant; Chris Lowe
- Producers: Craig Armstrong; Pet Shop Boys

Pet Shop Boys singles chronology
"New York City Boy" (1999)	"You Only Tell Me You Love Me When You're Drunk" (2000)	"Break 4 Love" (2001)

Music video
- "You Only Tell Me You Love Me When You're Drunk" on YouTube

"You Only Tell Me You Love Me When You're Drunk" is a song by English synth-pop duo Pet Shop Boys, released on 3 January 2000 as the third and final single from their seventh studio album, Nightlife (1999). It reached number eight on the UK Singles Chart and was the highest charting single from the album.

== Background and composition ==
"You Only Tell Me You Love Me When You're Drunk" was written in 1994 and was originally demoed in 1995 during sessions for Bilingual (1996). The title was inspired by Neil Tennant's personal experience in a relationship; he thought it was too soon to record the song for release at the time.

Pet Shop Boys worked on the song for Nightlife in Glasgow with producer and composer Craig Armstrong, who wrote the orchestral arrangement. Armstrong described the song as having a country and western sound. B. J. Cole played pedal steel guitar on the track.

The duo considered fitting the song into their musical, Closer to Heaven (2001), which they were working on at the same time, but they decided against it. The song was offered by their music publisher as a potential cover version for other artists, but nothing came of it.

== Release ==
Released on 3 January 2000, "You Only Tell Me You Love Me When You're Drunk" reached the Top 10 in the UK, peaking at number eight. It charted higher than the two previous singles from Nightlife but sold fewer copies its first week, with sales of 16,700. Lead single "I Don't Know What You Want but I Can't Give It Any More" debuted at number 15 with 26,300 copies sold, and "New York City Boy" opened at number 14 selling 22,700. Alan Jones of Music Week explained it as a sign of low sales overall in the post-Christmas period.

The single was used to promote the Nightlife Tour, which had started in 1999 and continued into 2000. There were three CD singles which also came as a boxset. CD1 was an enhanced CD that included the music video along with two new B-sides: "Lies", with Chris Lowe on lead vocals, and "Sail Away" by Noël Coward, which Pet Shop Boys recorded for the tribute album Twentieth-Century Blues: The Songs of Noël Coward (1998). CD2 had three remixes of "You Only Tell Me You Love Me When You're Drunk", and CD3 had a live version recorded on the Nightlife Tour, along "Always on My Mind" and "Being Boring" from the same concert. There was also a 12-inch double vinyl with four remixes.

=== Artwork ===
The CD1 single (pictured) showcased Tennant and Lowe's Nightlife look, wearing orange wigs, dark glasses, and prominent fake eyebrows. CD2 and CD3 showed them in costume during a Nightlife Tour concert, with the former featuring Lowe on the cover and the latter with Tennant. The 12-inch vinyl had a solid orange cover, matching the wigs, with individual photos of Tennant and Lowe similar to CD1 on the inner sleeves. The promotional copies were labeled "Drunk" instead of the full song title at designer Mark Farrow's suggestion.

== Critical reception ==
Music Week described the Pet Shop Boys' single as "Drenched in their typical brand of pathos and soul". Alexis Petridis of The Guardian ranked it at number 13 on his list of "Pet Shop Boys' 30 greatest songs" in 2023. He cited the "unexpected sound of pedal steel guitar" and concluded, "The effect is heartfelt and genuinely touching, the lush strings bolstering its romantic misery".

== Music video ==
The video was directed by Pedro Romhanyi, who had also directed "I Don't Know What You Want but I Can't Give It Any More". It was filmed at Shepperton Studios in London before the start of the Nightlife Tour in October 1999. It opens with a shot from above of a group of people lying on the ground and entwined in each other's arms in the aftermath of a party, with multiple versions of Tennant and Lowe among them. The partiers get up to dance in the middle of the song and then fall back to the floor asleep. The video was filmed in black and white, using a speeded up recording process for a slowed down presentation.

== Live performances ==
"You Only Tell Me You Love Me When You're Drunk" was performed on the Nightlife Tour (1999–2000) and the Release Tour (2002). It was also on the set list for the Dreamworld: The Greatest Hits Live tour in 2022–23. The song was performed with the BBC Concert Orchestra at the Mermaid Theatre in May 2006 and appears on the live album Concrete (2006).

== Track listings ==
All tracks are written by Neil Tennant and Chris Lowe except where noted. All live tracks were recorded at the Aerial Theater in Houston, Texas, on 25 October 1999.

- UK CD1
1. "You Only Tell Me You Love Me When You're Drunk" – 3:16
2. "Lies" – 4:42
3. "Sail Away" (Note: Includes a sample from the film In Which We Serve (1942)) (Noël Coward) – 4:37
4. "You Only Tell Me You Love Me When You're Drunk" (music video)
- UK CD2
1. "You Only Tell Me You Love Me When You're Drunk" (The T-Total mix edit) – 5:00
2. "You Only Tell Me You Love Me When You're Drunk" (Brother Brown's Newt mix) – 10:00
3. "You Only Tell Me You Love Me When You're Drunk" (Attaboy Still Love You When We're Sober mix) – 4:57
- UK CD3
1. "You Only Tell Me You Love Me When You're Drunk" (live) – 2:34
2. "Always on My Mind" (live) – 4:02
3. "Being Boring" (live) – 6:46
- UK 2×12-inch single

A. "You Only Tell Me You Love Me When You're Drunk" (Brother Brown's Newt mix) – 10:00
B. "You Only Tell Me You Love Me When You're Drunk" (Attaboy Still Love You When We're Sober mix) – 8:00
C. "You Only Tell Me You Love Me When You're Drunk" (The T-Total mix) – 8:14
D. "You Only Tell Me You Love Me When You're Drunk" (Brother Brown's Newt dub) – 7:41

- European CD single
1. "You Only Tell Me You Love Me When You're Drunk" (live) – 2:34
2. "Always on My Mind" (live) – 4:02

== Personnel ==
Personnel are adapted from the liner notes of Nightlife: Further Listening 1996–2000 and "You Only Tell Me You Love Me When You're Drunk".

Pet Shop Boys

- Chris Lowe
- Neil Tennant

Additional musicians

- Pete Lockett – percussion
- Stephen Hilton – programming, additional keyboards
- Craig Armstrong – piano, additional keyboards
- Ali MacLeod – guitar
- B. J. Cole – pedal steel guitar
- Scott J. Fraser – bass guitar
- The London Session Orchestra – strings
- Gavyn Wright – orchestra leader

Technical personnel

- Craig Armstrong – production, arrangement, orchestration
- Pet Shop Boys – production, arrangement
- Andy Bradfield – engineering
- Goetz – mixing
- Isobel Griffiths Ltd. – orchestra contractor
- Geoff Foster – strings recording

Artwork

- Farrow Design – design
- Harry Borden – photography (CD1)
- Lester Cohen – photography (CD2, CD3)
- Ian MacNeil – costume design

== Charts ==
Weekly chart performance for "You Only Tell Me You Love Me When You're Drunk"
Chart (2000)	Peak position
Belgium (Ultratip Bubbling Under Flanders)	14
Europe (Eurochart Hot 100 Singles)	48
Germany (GfK)	29
Hungary (MAHASZ)	5
Ireland (IRMA)	38
Netherlands (Single Top 100)	42
Scotland Singles (OCC)	18
Spain (Promusicae)	5
Sweden (Sverigetopplistan)	45
Switzerland (Schweizer Hitparade)	74
UK Singles (OCC)	8
