= Single-Bilingual =

1996 single by Pet Shop Boys

Single by Pet Shop Boys

from the album Bilingual
- B-side: "Discoteca"; "The Calm Before the Storm"; "Confidential"
- Released: 11 November 1996
- Genre: Latin; samba
- Length: 3:30; 3:48 (8:24 with "Discoteca" album version)
- Label: Parlophone
- Songwriters: Neil Tennant; Chris Lowe
- Producer: Pet Shop Boys

Pet Shop Boys singles chronology
"Se a vida é (That's the Way Life Is)" (1996)	"Single-Bilingual" (1996)	"A Red Letter Day" (1997)

Music video
- "Single-Bilingual" on YouTube

"Single-Bilingual" is a song by English synth-pop duo Pet Shop Boys, released on 11 November 1996 as the third single from their sixth studio album, Bilingual (1996). The track peaked at number 14 on the UK Singles Chart. The song is named "Single" on the album version but was retitled "Single-Bilingual" because Everything but the Girl also had a song named "Single", which had been released the previous May. The album version cross-fades with the previous track, "Discoteca", of which both the album and single versions feature an interpolation at the end.

== Background and composition ==
"Single-Bilingual" was written during the composition of "Discoteca", as a new song at the end of that track. The songs were on one mastertape, linked together by drums, which were performed by the Scottish women's drumming ensemble, SheBoom. The idea was to open the album with a sad song leading into a comedic, satirical song.

"Single-Bilingual" is about a business traveller in Europe. The title was originally "Latino", and the lyrics by Neil Tennant include several Spanish phrases. "Perdóneme me llamo Neil" (Excuse me, my name is Neil) was a nod to Martin Fry saying his own name in "The Look of Love" (1982). The refrain from "Discoteca", "Hay una discoteca por aquí?" (Is there a disco near here?), is reprised at the end.

== Release ==
The single was released on two different CDs and on cassette, with promotional copies on 12-inch vinyl. A new version of "Discoteca", which had been considered as its own single, was included as a B-side; it featured singer Katie Kissoon and additional vocals in Spanish by Davide Giovannini, Joseph De Jesus, Weston Foster, and Lino Rocha.

The B-side "The Calm Before the Storm" was written by Tennant about waiting for the news of where Bilingual would place on the UK Albums Chart. Another B-side was the Pet Shop Boys' demo of "Confidential", a song they wrote for Tina Turner on her album Wildest Dreams (1996).

=== Artwork ===
The single covers designed by Mark Farrow were solid colours, yellow and green, with no image for the first time since the 1986 release of "Opportunities (Let's Make Lots of Money)". The text was overlaid in a style similar to the Bilingual album cover. The promotional copies displayed the overlapping phrases, "¿Hay una discoteca por acqui [sic]?" and "Is there a disco near here?"

== Critical reception ==
A reviewer from Music Week rated the song three out of five, adding, "The album has fallen from the Top 75, but this class single — devastatingly detailing the life of an upwardly-mobile Euro-executive — should return it to the forefront." Simon Price of Melody Maker was critical of the song, commenting that the use of "hundreds of real drums all over a Pet Shop Boys record" is "like ants on a chocolate bar and just as unwelcome". He continued, "I try hard to think Fleetwood Mac's 'Tusk' and not think Paul Simon's Graceland, but there's no avoiding it: this sucks."

== Music video ==
The accompanying music video was directed by Howard Greenhalgh, in the style of an advertisement, and was filmed at London Stansted Airport. It features Neil Tennant as a glib businessman travelling across Europe and trying to pick up a woman in a bar. Towards the end, the visuals feature military aircraft suggesting that he is in fact an arms trader.

Chris Lowe commented, "I think Neil gives one of the best performances ever in a video... It's really funny. It brings out Neil's true humour".

== Live performances ==
Pet Shop Boys promoted the single with a semi-live performance on the Channel 4 television programme TFI Friday on 1 November 1996. "Single-Bilingual" was performed on the Dreamworld: The Greatest Hits Live tour (2022–24), paired with "Se a vida é (That's the Way Life Is)", and appears on the concert film recorded in 2023.

== Track listings ==
All tracks are written by Neil Tennant and Chris Lowe.

- UK CD1
1. "Single-Bilingual"
2. "Discoteca" (new version)
3. "The Calm Before the Storm"
4. "Discoteca" (Trouser Enthusiast's Adventures Beyond the Stellar Empire mix)
- UK CD2
1. "Discoteca" (PSB extended mix)
2. "Confidential" (1992 demo for Tina Turner)
3. "Single-Bilingual" (Baby Doc mix)
4. "Discoteca" (Baby Doc mix)
- UK cassette single and European CD single
1. "Single-Bilingual"
2. "Discoteca" (new version)

== Personnel ==
Personnel are adapted from the Bilingual: Further Listening 1995–1997 liner notes.

Pet Shop Boys

- Chris Lowe
- Neil Tennant

Additional musicians

- SheBoom – drums, percussion
- Pete Gleadall – programming

Technical personnel

- Pet Shop Boys – production
- Bob Kraushaar – engineering, mixing

Artwork

- Farrow Design – design

== Charts ==
Weekly chart performance for "Single-Bilingual"
Chart (1996–1997)	Peak position
Belgium (Ultratip Bubbling Under Flanders)	13
Canada Dance/Urban (RPM)	22
Europe (Eurochart Hot 100 Singles)	84
Finland (Suomen virallinen lista)	17
Germany (GfK)	77
Scottish Singles Sales (Official Charts)	19
Sweden (Sverigetopplistan)	39
UK Singles (Official Charts)	14
