= I Don't Know What You Want but I Can't Give It Any More =

1999 single by Pet Shop Boys

Single by Pet Shop Boys

from the album Nightlife
- B-side: "Silver Age"; "Screaming"; "Je t'aime... moi non plus"
- Released: 19 July 1999
- Studio: Quad (New York City); Sarm West (London) (Note: Mixing)
- Genre: Electronica
- Length: 5:09 (album version); 4:29 (edit)
- Label: Parlophone
- Songwriters: Neil Tennant; Chris Lowe
- Producers: David Morales; Pet Shop Boys

Pet Shop Boys singles chronology
"Somewhere" (1997)	"I Don't Know What You Want but I Can't Give It Any More" (1999)	"New York City Boy" (1999)

Music video
- "I Don't Know What You Want but I Can't Give It Any More" on YouTube

"I Don't Know What You Want but I Can't Give It Any More" is a song by English synth-pop duo Pet Shop Boys from their seventh studio album, Nightlife (1999). Released on 19 July 1999 as the album's lead single, it peaked at number 15 on the UK Singles Chart, number two on the US Hot Dance Club Play chart, and number 66 on the US Hot Singles Sales chart.

== Background and composition ==
"I Don't Know What You Want but I Can't Give It Any More" was written in May 1998 during a songwriting session for the album at Chris Difford's studio in East Sussex. It originated with Chris Lowe's idea to write a song about Action Man following the success of Aqua's hit single "Barbie Girl" (1997). An early version included the line, "If anyone can, the action man can". Ultimately, the lyrics by Neil Tennant dealt with the end of the same relationship as the third single, "You Only Tell Me You Love Me When You're Drunk". It was one of two songs on Nightlife produced by David Morales, along with the second single, "New York City Boy", and it was recorded at Quad Studios in New York.

== Release ==
"I Don't Know What You Want but I Can't Give It Any More" was selected as the first single because Pet Shop Boys' record label Parlophone considered "New York City Boy" to be too camp for the lead spot. It debuted at number 15 in the UK, selling 26,300 copies its first week. Elsewhere in Europe, the single debuted at number one in Hungary and also reached the Top 10 in Spain and Finland.

The song premiered on The Radio 1 Breakfast Show hosted by Zoe Ball. It was C-listed on the third-tier playlists of BBC Radio 1 and BBC Radio 2 as well as MTV UK. Alan Jones of Music Week described radio support of the single as "patchy" for its first three weeks, with a resurgence in airplay in early August on Radio 1 and Independent Local Radio after the single had dropped out of the Top 20 to number 38 on the sales chart.

In the United States, the single was released in 2000 on London-Sire Records, remixed by Peter Rauhofer. Billboard commented: "Rauhofer's wonderfully trippy tribal beats are the perfect backdrop for Neil Tennant's unmistakable vocals". It entered the Hot Dance Club Play chart at number 40 on 15 April 2000 and peaked at number two on 27 May. The single entered the sales charts on 17 June, debuting at number 10 on Hot Dance Music Maxi-Singles Sales and at number 66 on Hot 100 Singles Sales.

=== Artwork ===
The single artwork featured a photo by Eric Watson of Tennant and Lowe walking four Weimaraner dogs. The image was split in half across the two CD covers: the duo appeared on CD1 (pictured) with two of the dogs, and the other two Weimaraner were on CD2. The dogs and the sloped street were intended to convey an impression of motion. The typeface was a blurred dot matrix style. The costumes were designed by Ian MacNeil, inspired by a type of trousers worn by samurai; the look was completed with wigs, dark glasses, and thick eyebrows.

== Music video ==
The accompanying music video was directed by Pedro Romhanyl. It features the duo undergoing treatment that transforms them into their Nightlife costumes, before being released into a world where everyone looks like them. The video was inspired by several films, including THX 1138 (1971), Ridicule (1996), 2001: A Space Odyssey (1968), and A Clockwork Orange (1971). It was filmed in a London studio as well as on location at The Heathland School and Twickenham Stadium.

== Critical reception ==
Victoria Segal from NME described the song as "a peppery account of infidelity and betrayal, all muted peaks and sequenced depression ... If it sounds a little too glossy, like it should play out the next Tom Cruise blockbuster, it's still a sad and passionate thing". Pop Rescue commented, "This is a really catchy track – musically and vocally, with sweeping strings, and co-production from legendary producer David Morales. The video is also an amusing piece, with Neil and Chris looking like cloned Rod Stewarts as Jedi, talking [sic] the dogs for a walk". Music Week observed, "this Seventies disco-tinged first single from their sixth studio album remains classic PSB. The elegance of the arrangement showcases their intelligent approach to pop and will please the fans".

== Live performances ==
"I Don't Know What You Want but I Can't Give It Any More" was played on the Nightlife Tour (1999–2000). The song was performed again on the Dreamworld: The Greatest Hits Live tour (2022–24) and appears on the concert film recorded in 2023.

== Track listings ==
All tracks are written by Neil Tennant and Chris Lowe except where noted.

- UK CD1
1. "I Don't Know What You Want but I Can't Give It Any More" – 4:29
2. "Silver Age" – 3:25
3. "Screaming" – 4:58
4. "I Don't Know What You Want but I Can't Give It Any More" (music video)
- UK CD2 and Canadian CD single
1. "I Don't Know What You Want but I Can't Give It Any More" (The Morales remix) – 7:48
2. "I Don't Know What You Want but I Can't Give It Any More" (Thee Maddkatt Courtship 80 Witness mix) – 7:39
3. "Je t'aime... moi non plus" (Serge Gainsbourg) – 4:14
- UK 12-inch single

A1. "I Don't Know What You Want but I Can't Give It Any More" (The Morales remix) – 7:47
A2. "I Don't Know What You Want but I Can't Give It Any More" (dub mix) – 7:31
A3. "I Don't Know What You Want but I Can't Give It Any More" (radio fade) – 4:01
B1. "I Don't Know What You Want but I Can't Give It Any More" (Thee Maddkatt Courtship 80 Witness mix) – 7:39
B2. "I Don't Know What You Want but I Can't Give It Any More" (Thee Drum Drum mix) – 7:33
B3. "I Don't Know What You Want but I Can't Give It Any More" (Thee 2 Blak Ninja mix) – 5:30

- UK cassette single
1. "I Don't Know What You Want but I Can't Give It Any More" – 4:29
2. "Silver Age" – 3:25
3. "Screaming" – 4:58
- European CD single
1. "I Don't Know What You Want but I Can't Give It Any More" – 4:29
2. "Silver Age" – 3:25
- US maxi-CD single
1. "I Don't Know What You Want but I Can't Give It Any More" (Peter Rauhofer radio edit) – 3:11
2. "I Don't Know What You Want but I Can't Give It Any More" (The Young Collective radio edit) – 3:48
3. "I Don't Know What You Want but I Can't Give It Any More" (Peter Rauhofer Roxy Anthem) – 10:27
4. "I Don't Know What You Want but I Can't Give It Any More" (Peter Rauhofer Roxy dub) – 7:31
5. "I Don't Know What You Want but I Can't Give It Any More" (The Young Collective remix) – 10:40
6. "I Don't Know What You Want but I Can't Give It Any More" (Thee Drum Drum mix—re-edit) – 7:14
7. "I Don't Know What You Want but I Can't Give It Any More" (PSB Extension mix) – 8:38
- US 2×12-inch single

A. "I Don't Know What You Want but I Can't Give It Any More" (Peter Rauhofer Roxy Anthem) – 10:25
B. "I Don't Know What You Want but I Can't Give It Any More" (The Young Collective remix) – 10:39
C. "I Don't Know What You Want but I Can't Give It Any More" (Peter Rauhofer Roxy dub) – 7:30
D. "I Don't Know What You Want but I Can't Give It Any More" (Thee Drum Drum Mix—re-edit) – 7:11

- Australian CD single
1. "I Don't Know What You Want but I Can't Give It Any More" (radio edit) – 4:27
2. "I Don't Know What You Want but I Can't Give It Any More" (The Morales remix) – 7:48
3. "I Don't Know What You Want but I Can't Give It Any More" (The PSB Extension) – 8:39
4. "Screaming" – 4:55
5. "Je t'aime... moi non plus" (Gainsbourg) – 4:15

== Personnel ==
Credits adapted from Nightlife: Further Listening 1996–2000 liner notes and Catalogue (2006).

Pet Shop Boys

- Chris Lowe
- Neil Tennant

Additional musicians

- Peter "Ski" Schwartz – keyboards, programming, string arrangement
- Pete Gleadall – additional programming
- Audrey Wheeler – backing vocals

Technical personnel

- David Morales – production
- Pet Shop Boys – production
- Steve Barkan – engineering
- Bill Importico, Jr. – engineering assistant
- Hugo Dwyer – strings engineering
- Goetz Botzenhardt – mixing

Artwork

- Farrow Design – design
- Eric Watson – photography
- Ian MacNeil – costume design

== Charts ==
=== Weekly charts ===
Weekly chart performance for "I Don't Know What You Want but I Can't Give It Any More"
Chart (1999–2000)	Peak position
Australia (ARIA)	67
Austria (Ö3 Austria Top 40)	37
Belgium (Ultratip Bubbling Under Flanders)	4
Canada (Nielsen SoundScan)	14
Europe (Eurochart Hot 100 Singles)	26
Finland (Suomen virallinen lista)	5
Germany (GfK)	23
Hungary (MAHASZ)	1
Iceland (Íslenski Listinn Topp 40)	30
Italy (FIMI)	9
Italy Airplay (Music & Media)	13
Netherlands (Dutch Top 40 Tipparade)	20
Netherlands (Single Top 100)	64
Scotland Singles (Official Charts)	17
Spain (Promusicae)	6
Sweden (Sverigetopplistan)	26
Switzerland (Schweizer Hitparade)	28
UK Singles (Official Charts)	15
US Dance Club Songs (Billboard)	2
US Dance Singles Sales (Billboard)	10
US Hot Singles Sales (Billboard)	66

=== Year-end charts ===
Year-end chart performance for "I Don't Know What You Want but I Can't Give It Any More"
Chart (2000)	Position
US Dance Club Play (Billboard)	38

== Release history ==
Release dates and formats for "I Don't Know What You Want but I Can't Give It Any More"
Region	Date	Format(s)	Label(s)	Ref.
United Kingdom	19 July 1999	CD; cassette	Parlophone	
Canada	10 August 1999	CD	Parlophone; EMI Music Canada	
Australia	27 September 1999	CD	Parlophone	
