= Somewhere (song) =

1957 duet from West Side Story

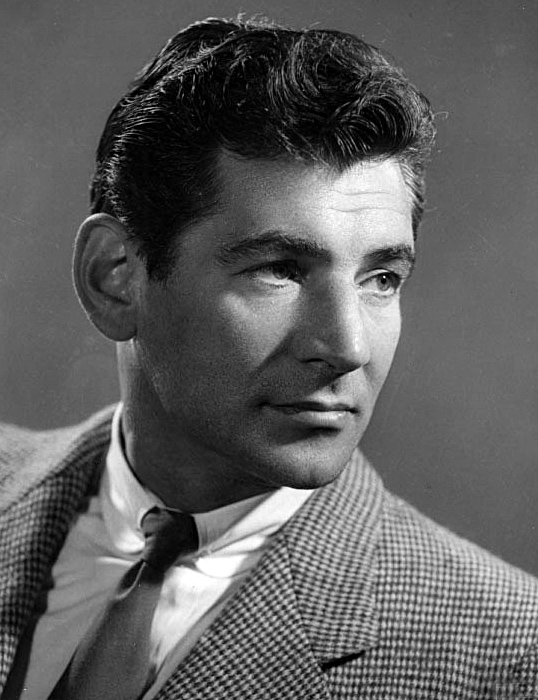
Leonard Bernstein, c. 1950s

"Somewhere", sometimes referred to as "Somewhere (There's a Place for Us)" or simply "There's a Place for Us", is a duet from act 2, scene 2 of the 1957 musical West Side Story that was made into films in 1961 and 2021. The music is composed by Leonard Bernstein with lyrics by Stephen Sondheim in his Broadway debut.

== In West Side Story ==
In a 1998 interview for a documentary on Bernstein, Sondheim expressed dissatisfaction with his lyrics for the song, going so far as to call them "embarrassing". He stated that he did not like the fact that in the opening line, the stressed note falls on the word "a" – in his view, the least significant word. However, composer Edward Barnes notes the perfect rhymes to the title "Somewhere": 'air', 'spare', 'care', 'there' and the alliterations 'hold my hand and we're halfway there, hold my hand', 'some day, somehow, somewhere'.

Bernstein used "Somewhere" in his 1961 suite, Symphonic Dances from West Side Story.

=== Stage musical ===
"Somewhere" follows the song "I Feel Pretty" where Maria declares her love for Tony, unaware that Tony has stabbed her brother at "The Rumble" at the end of act 1. After she learned of her brother's death, Tony appears at her window. In Arthur Laurents's original book, the following scene would be shown as a ballet dance. For this, Bernstein used a melody he had written several years before, but then realized that this tune ought to be sung. Jerome Robbins however did not want to distract from the ballet by a singer, so it was sung from off-stage. It is later reprised by the entire company. In the original Broadway production, "Somewhere" was sung by Reri Grist who played the role of Consuelo. At the end of the show, when Tony is shot, Maria sings the first few lines of the song as he dies in her arms. In late 1957, this recording was released on the album West Side Story (Original Broadway Cast).

Music critic Alex Ross and composer Edward Barnes observe that a considerable part of the song's melodic material strongly resembles phrases from the slow movement of Beethoven's 'Emperor' Piano Concerto, the second theme from Richard Strauss's Burleske for piano and orchestra, and the second part of the main theme of Tchaikovsky's Swan Lake.

=== 1961 film ===
In the 1961 film, Maria cries out, "It's not us...it's everything around us." and Tony replies, "Then I'll take you away, where nothing can get to us." He then begins singing "Somewhere" to her. His comforting voice draws her in and it becomes a duet of hope that their love will survive "somehow, someday, somewhere".

As in the stage show, Maria sings the last few lines of the song as Tony dies in her arms at the end of the musical. In 2004, this version finished at #20 on AFI's 100 Years...100 Songs survey of top tunes in American cinema. In June 2026, CBS News included the song in its list of the 250 essential American songs of the past 250 years.

"Somewhere" is the only track that is out of sequence on the original soundtrack album as it is the last track on Side 2. This is rectified on the CD as "Somewhere" is correctly placed in sequence to the film between "The Rumble" and "Cool."

=== 2021 film ===
In the 2021 film, the song also takes place after "I Feel Pretty", but now it is sung by Valentina (Rita Moreno), a reworked version of the character Doc. The ballet is again omitted, like in the 1961 film. This version was also used to underscore the film's teaser trailer, which premiered during the 93rd Academy Awards telecast on April 25, 2021.

== P. J. Proby version ==
In 1964, P. J. Proby released his version of "Somewhere", which reached number six in the British and eight in the Australian singles charts. The song also charted well in various European countries.

== The Supremes' version ==
In 1965, the Supremes recorded the song for their album, There's a Place for Us, though it went unreleased until 2004. They also used it for their debut appearance at the Copacabana nightclub in New York City and it eventually became a fixture of their nightclub acts. They also sang the song on The Ed Sullivan Show and The Hollywood Palace. In contrast to the original melody, a special dramatic monologue was incorporated, which was frequently changed in conjunction with changes in the group as well as the country's turmoil in the late 1960s.

In the aftermath of the shooting of Martin Luther King Jr., the monologue was changed to reflect King's "I Have a Dream" speech. When the Supremes appeared on The Tonight Show Starring Johnny Carson the day after King had been murdered, lead singer Diana Ross was so overcome with emotion that she practically stumbled through the speech, but got an extraordinary ovation from the studio audience. It would once again be nationally televised several months later that year when the group paired up with the Temptations for an NBC television special, TCB. The monologue for that special went as follows:

Yes, there's a place for each of us,
And we must try to pursue this place.
Where love is like a passion, that burns like a fire,
Let our efforts be as determined as that of Dr. Martin Luther King,
Who had a dream that all God's children,
Black men, white men, Jews, Gentiles, Protestants, and Catholics,
Could join hands and sing that spiritual of old:
"Free at last! Thank God Almighty, free at last!"

== Barbra Streisand version ==
"Somewhere"

Single by Barbra Streisand

from the album The Broadway Album
- B-side: "Not While I'm Around"
- Released: December 1985
- Studio: Randy Waldman (North Hollywood); Lighthouse Studios (North Hollywood)
- Length: 4:56
- Label: Columbia Records
- Composer: Leonard Bernstein
- Lyricist: Stephen Sondheim
- Producer: David Foster

Barbra Streisand singles chronology
"Emotion" (1985)	"Somewhere" (1985)	"Send In the Clowns" (1986)

In 1985, American singer, songwriter, actress and director Barbra Streisand released a version of "Somewhere" as a single from the Grammy Award-winning The Broadway Album. In the United States, it narrowly missed the top 40 on the Billboard Hot 100, peaking at number 43, but fared better on the Adult Contemporary chart, peaking at number five. It also peaked at number 88 on the UK Singles Chart. David Foster (the song's arranger) won the Grammy Award for Best Instrumental Arrangement Accompanying Vocal(s). In 2011, a duet was produced using scenes from Streisand's version while Jackie Evancho performed live with David Foster at the Ringling Museum of Art. On her 2014 Partners album, she released a new recording of the song, this time as a duet with Josh Groban.

=== Charts ===
Chart performance for "Somewhere"
Chart (1986)	Peak position
Canada Top Singles (RPM)	72
Canada Adult Contemporary (RPM)	2
UK Singles (Official Charts)	88
US Billboard Hot 100	43
US Adult Contemporary (Billboard)	5

== Marianne Faithfull version ==
British singer Marianne Faithfull covered the song on her 2008 album Easy Come, Easy Go, a record of covers from different eras, featuring English singer and musician Jarvis Cocker on vocals.

== Phil Collins version ==
British musician Phil Collins recorded the song in 1996 for the album The Songs of West Side Story.

=== Critical reception ===
Steve Baltin from Cash Box wrote, "Taken from the tribute album The Songs of West Side Story, this classic takes on a whole new connotation than previously heard in Tom Waits and Barbra Streisand's brilliant versions. Collins' lush arrangement milks the song for all the sap it has to offer, bilking the schmaltz factor to create a song reminiscent of his more recent ballads. Look for strong support from Adult Contemporary for the track."

=== Charts ===
Chart performance for "Somewhere"
Chart (1996)	Peak position
Canada Top Singles (RPM)	68
Canada Adult Contemporary (RPM)	8
US Adult Contemporary (Billboard)	7

== Pet Shop Boys version ==
"Somewhere"

Single by Pet Shop Boys

from the album Bilingual (special edition)
- B-side: "The View from Your Balcony"; "Disco Potential"
- Released: June 23, 1997
- Genre: Hi-NRG
- Length: 4:42
- Label: Parlophone
- Composer: Leonard Bernstein
- Lyricist: Stephen Sondheim
- Producer: Pet Shop Boys

Pet Shop Boys singles chronology
"A Red Letter Day" (1997)	"Somewhere" (1997)	"I Don't Know What You Want but I Can't Give It Any More" (1999)

Music video
- "Somewhere" on YouTube

"Somewhere" was released as a single by English synth-pop duo Pet Shop Boys on June 23, 1997, to promote their "Somewhere" residency at the Savoy Theatre in London, which was named after the song, and to promote a repackage of Bilingual.

The single was another top-10 entry for the group, peaking at number nine on the UK Singles Chart. In the United States, where the song was released as a double A-side with "A Red Letter Day", the single reached number 25 on the Billboard Bubbling Under Hot 100 Singles chart and number 19 on the Billboard Dance Club Play chart.

The Pet Shop Boys' version also uses elements of two other West Side Story songs, "One Hand, One Heart" and "I Feel Pretty", and includes a sample of dialogue from the 1993 film Menace II Society. The extended mix features lyrics from "One Hand, One Heart" spoken by Chris Lowe.

=== Critical reception ===
Barry Walters for The Advocate said Pet Shop Boys "do for this West Side Story standard what k.d. lang did for 'Secret Love' in The Celluloid Closet – put a showbiz classic in the queer context it always deserved." Larry Flick from Billboard magazine wrote, "In a perfect world, this wistful disco cover of the classic song [...] would meet with open arms at pop radio. But, alas, narrow programming minds and even tighter playlist space will probably limit this single to the clubs—which is not necessarily a sad fate. Partners Neil Tennant and Chris Lowe dress the song in vibrant trance/NRG keyboards and plucky beats." He added, "Also quite nice is a stately orchestral version that allows Tennant to be at his melodramatic best."

British magazine Music Week rated the song three out of five, noting Tennant's "emotionally controlled vocals and a thumping techno pop beat". They also concluded, "But despite its high drama, this is too overblown, even by PSB standards." Music Week editor Alan Jones felt that the duo "turns it from an emotional tour-de-force into a camp disco celebration, where its subleties are completely lost. Working with such a melodic and powerful song they can't help but succeed, however." David Sinclair from The Times viewed it as a "questionable disco version" of the West Side Story standard.

=== Track listings ===
- UK CD single 1 Parlophone CDRS 6470
1. "Somewhere"
2. "The View from Your Balcony"
3. "To Step Aside" (Ralphi's Old School Dub)
4. "Somewhere" (Forthright Vocal Mix)
- UK CD single 2 Parlophone CDR 6470
1. "Somewhere" (Orchestral version)
2. "Disco Potential"
3. "Somewhere" (Trouser Enthusiasts Mix)
4. "Somewhere" (Forthright Dub)
- UK cassette single TCR 6470
1. "Somewhere"
2. "Somewhere" (Orchestral version)
3. "The View from Your Balcony"

=== Charts ===
Weekly chart performance for "Somewhere"
Chart (1997)	Peak position
Australia (ARIA)	56
Europe (Eurochart Hot 100)	72
Finland (Suomen virallinen lista)	9
Germany (GfK)	70
Hungary (MAHASZ)	4
Netherlands (Dutch Top 40 Tipparade)	20
Scottish Singles Sales (Official Charts)	11
Sweden (Sverigetopplistan)	21
UK Singles (Official Charts)	9
US Bubbling Under Hot 100 (Billboard)	25
US Dance Club Songs (Billboard)	19
US Dance Singles Sales (Billboard) with "A Red Letter Day"	8

== Other renditions ==
- Judy Garland and Vic Damone performed "Somewhere" as part of a West Side Story medley on The Judy Garland Show on January 19, 1964.
- Len Barry recorded "Somewhere", which was released as a single in 1966 that peaked at number 26 on the Billboard Hot 100.
- Peter and Gordon included "Somewhere" on their 1966 album Woman (Capitol T 2477 (mono) Capitol ST 2477 (stereo))
- Since 1966, The Dartmouth Aires have performed "Somewhere" which quickly became the group's traditional alumni song. In addition to its appearance on several Aires albums, they performed a truncated version as a swan song after their runner-up placement on NBC's The Sing-Off in 2011.
- Aretha Franklin recorded the song on her 1973 album Hey Now Hey (The Other Side of the Sky).
- Tom Waits recorded the song on his 1978 album Blue Valentine.
- Frankie Lymon: 1964: (Columbia 4-43094), "Somewhere" / "Sweet and Lovely" (R&B Chart placing: No. 66)
- Tina May, the British jazz singer, performed the song on her 1993 album Fun.
- Renato Russo, a Brazilian singer and composer, recorded the song on his 1994 debut solo album The Stonewall Celebration Concert.
- Ben Platt performed this song at the 60th Annual Grammy Awards as a tribute to Leonard Bernstein.
- Rick Astley recorded the song for his sixth studio album Portrait in 2005.
- Dave Koz recorded a jazz version featuring Anita Baker which is on his 2007 album At the Movies. It was released as a single in 2006.
- Kimberley Walsh recorded this song for her 2012 album Centre Stage.
- Angeline Quinto recorded the song for the soundtrack of the period telenovela Ikaw Lamang, aired by Philippine television network ABS-CBN in 2014.
- Bobby Sanabria and his Multiverse Big Band performed the song with a Latin jazz arrangement using the Venezuelan joropo rhythm, recorded live in 2017, and released the following year on the Grammy-nominated album West Side Story Reimagined, which won the Jazz Journalists Award for best album of 2018.
- Cynthia Erivo, Ben Platt, Leslie Odom Jr., and Rachel Zegler (the latter of whom played Maria in the 2021 film) performed this song at the 64th Annual Grammy Awards as a tribute to Stephen Sondheim during the "In Memoriam" segment.
- Jazz musician Pat Metheny recorded a solo guitar version of "Somewhere" for his 2024 album MoonDial.
