= Karen Bernod =

- Born: Karen Bernod; May 13, 1964 (age 62)
- Origin: Brooklyn, New York, United States
- Genres: R&B, soul, neo soul, jazz, dance
- Occupations: Singer-songwriter, music producer
- Instruments: Vocals, Piano
- Years active: 1989–present
- Labels: Natively Creative Music; Dome Records
- Website: http://www.karenbernodmusic.com

Karen Bernod (born May 13, 1964, Brooklyn, New York) is an American-born R&B vocalist, songwriter and producer. She is best known for her unique vocal harmonies as a background singer for Chaka Khan, Erykah Badu, C&C Music Factory and D'Angelo.

== Biography ==
Growing up in Brooklyn's Bed-Stuy, Bernod performed in neighborhood talent shows. Her favorite songs were usually by female artists such as Natalie Cole, Chaka Khan, Roberta Flack and Stephanie Mills. The youngest of three, Bernod is a native New Yorker. She attended Erasmus Hall High School which has numerous famous musical alumni such as Will Downing, Barbra Streisand, Kedar Massenberg, and Stephanie Mills. There Bernod was very active in music, theater and student government. She served as senior class president and was a member of the female choir "Cantata". She majored in music at the State University of New York at New Paltz (SUNY) but took a leave of absence after one year to pursue her music career.

== Professional career ==
Bernod became the warm-up performer for The Bill Cosby Show. She was a principal in the off-Broadway play Mama, I Want to Sing! Her first jingle was a Budweiser spot with Tone Loc.

Bernod soon started singing background vocals for various House artists, which landed her an opportunity to co-write and perform the club classic "Motherland", produced by Winston Jones. She was the vocal (doo-wop) consultant and vocalist for Paul Simon's production of Cape Man with Marc Anthony and Rubén Blades. She also recorded two of Simon's CD projects as well as projects with Ru Paul, Whitney Houston, Luther Vandross and Stephanie Mills.

Bernod traveled abroad, recording and touring with D'Angelo and Erykah Badu. While on tour with Badu, Bernod received an invite to add her vocals on an album by the UK's jazz funk band Incognito. She is featured on three cuts No Time Like The Future: "Marrakech", "More Of Myself", and "Yesterday's Dream".

After touring Europe and America, Bernod returned home to Brooklyn and started production on her solo project. She chose the title Some Othaness 4 U because her music encompasses all of her varied influences. She wrote and arranged, along with producers Greg Spooner and Norman Keyes Hurt.

Bernod's second CD, Life @ 360 Degrees, was released on the UK's Dome Records. The album brings forth Bernod's earthy three-octave tone, laid against an urban backdrop that possesses a sense of a family unity with strong soulful presence. She worked with Greg Spooner on this project.

Since the release of her second solo project, Bernod has continued work as a background singer along with focusing on her solo career. She has begun recording a third solo album. She has toured with artists such as Mary J. Blige, Chaka Khan, and Martha Redbone. She works as a volunteer with various youth organizations, human rights groups, and health organizations.

== Discography ==
Solo projects

- 2000: Some Othaness For U
- 2006: Life @ 360 Degrees
- 2014: #PlantingSeeds
- 2016: Four Women: Side 1 (EP)
- 2022: LYFE REMIXED
- 2025: Some Othaness For U (25th Anniversary Edition)
- 2026: IRIS

Tribal House

- 1990: Motherland

C&C Music Factory (1990–1995)

- 1990: Everybody Dance – Japan release written by Karen Bernod and Robert Clivillés
- 1991: Pride (In the Name of Love) remix
- 1991: Just a Lil Bit of Love – written by Karen Bernod and Robert Clivillés
- 1996: Love and Happiness – written by Karen Bernod and Robert Clivillés
- 1996: I Live – written by Karen Bernod, H. Hector and Robert Clivillés

Paul Simon

- 1990: The Rhythm of the Saints
- 1997: Songs from The Capeman

Rupaul

- 1993: Supermodel of the World

Barbara Tucker

- 1994: Beautiful People

Pet Shop Boys

- 1996: Bilingual

Bahamadia

- 1996: Kollage

Erykah Badu

- 1997: Live
- 1998: "Tyrone" video

D'Angelo

- 1998: Live at the Jazz Cafe

Incognito (1999–2000)

- 1999: No Time Like The Future
- 2000: The Best of Incognito

Kloud 9

- 2002: On Kloud 9
- 2007: Yearning 2 Love

Geoff Matton

- 2003: Unity

Mary J. Blige

- 2003: Love and Life limited edition CD and DVD
- 2004: Live in Los Angeles DVD

Willie Nelson

- 2006: Songbird

Elisabeth Withers

- 2007: It Can Happen to Anyone

== Jingles ==
Pantene, Denny's, Dentyne, Fresca, Budweiser, Seagram's Gin, AT&T, Bacardi, Kenya Dolls, Kool-Aid, Mercedes Benz, Sears, Oil of Olay, Burger King
