= New York City Boy =

1999 single by Pet Shop Boys

Single by Pet Shop Boys

from the album Nightlife
- B-side: "The Ghost of Myself"; "Casting a Shadow"
- Released: 22 September 1999
- Studio: Quad (New York City)
- Genre: Disco
- Length: 5:16
- Label: Parlophone
- Songwriters: Neil Tennant; Chris Lowe; David Morales
- Producers: David Morales; Pet Shop Boys

Pet Shop Boys singles chronology
| "I Don't Know What You Want but I Can't Give It Any More" (1999) | "New York City Boy" (1999) | "You Only Tell Me You Love Me When You're Drunk" (2000) |

Music video
- "New York City Boy" on YouTube

"New York City Boy" is a song by English synth-pop duo Pet Shop Boys, released on 22 September 1999 as the second single from their seventh studio album, Nightlife (1999). In the UK, the single peaked at number 14 on the UK Singles Chart. It also reached the charts in several other European countries, peaking at number three in Spain, and number four in Finland and Hungary. In the US, the song hit number one on the Billboard Hot Dance Club Play chart and number 53 on the Billboard Hot Singles Sales chart.

== Background and recording ==
"New York City Boy" was conceived as a tribute to the disco era. It was co-written and produced with American DJ David Morales, who had remixed "So Hard" (1990), and it was recorded in New York City at Quad Studios. Chris Lowe worked on the music with Morales, who suggested doing the song in the style of the Village People. Neil Tennant wrote the lyric about a young person coming into the city from the suburbs. A string and horn arrangement by Vincent Montana Jr., known as "the Godfather of Disco", gave the track a retro feel.

The song's string arrangements interpolate "It's Good for the Soul" by Montana's Salsoul Orchestra. The song also samples "MacArthur Park" as recorded by Donna Summer.

== Release ==
The single was released on 22 September 1999 in Japan. In the UK, it came out on 27 September and sold 22,700 copies the first week, debuting at number 14 on the UK Singles Chart. "New York City Boy" was on BBC Radio 1's third-tier C-List and was the last Pet Shop Boys single to be featured on a Radio 1 playlist.

One of the single's B-sides, "Casting a Shadow", was written for Radio 1 during the 11 August 1999 solar eclipse, and CD2 included a video of the song with footage of the eclipse in the UK.

In 2003, Pet Shop Boys recorded the song in French as "Paris City Boy" at the request of EMI France, with new lyrics by Jérôme Soligny. A version with the chorus in French and the verses in English was included on the French edition of PopArt: The Hits (2003) and was used to promote that album in France. The full French version was released on Nightlife: Further Listening 1997–2000 in 2017.

=== Artwork ===
The single sleeves were designed by Mark Farrow with photographs by Eric Watson. Farrow created the typeface, using a lowercase letter n with other letters in uppercase, printed in fluorescent yellow ink. The photos feature Tennant and Lowe in their Nightlife-era orange wigs, dark glasses, and fake eyebrows, wearing metal foil jackets by Versace. They were taken in an alley off West Central Street in London. The promotional four-disc, seven-track 12-inch vinyl was labeled PSB NYC BOY on the front, with large numerals 1 to 7 on the inner sleeves.

== Critical reception ==
Pop Rescue commented, "Disco comes unashamedly bursting in, with second single 'New York City Boy', a kind of early 'Your Disco Needs You', complete with camp video and men's choruses throughout." Music Week described it as, "A firm return to Seventies New York disco and again firmly tongue-in-cheek, the Pet Shop Boys go Village People in the chorus to addictive effect".

== Music video ==
The music video for the song features the New York nightspot Studio 54 and was directed by British director Howard Greenhalgh. The story follows a teenage boy, going from daydreaming in his bedroom into New York City. Different eras are represented, with sailor costumes as a nod to the post-war 1940s, a West Side Story dance sequence for the 1950s, an extended 1970s disco scene, and breakdancers from the 1980s on the street. Tennant and Lowe also appear; their scenes were shot in London, and Greenhalgh later filmed footage in New York and merged them. Tennant called it "the most expensive video we have ever done".

== Live performances ==
"New York City Boy" was performed on the Nightlife Tour (1999–2000), with the original backing vocalists—Steve Abram, Billy Cliff, Keith Fluitt, and John James—singing and dancing in sailor suits. The song was also played on the Release Tour (2002). A live version from the Pandemonium Tour (2009–10) is on Pandemonium (2010), and another from the Super Tour (2016–19) is on Inner Sanctum (2019). Pet Shop Boys performed the song on the Dreamworld: The Greatest Hits Live tour (2022–25).

== Track listings ==
"New York City Boy" is by Neil Tennant, Chris Lowe, and David Morales. All other tracks are by Tennant/Lowe.

- UK CD1 and Australian CD single
1. "New York City Boy" (radio edit)
2. "The Ghost of Myself"
3. "New York City Boy" (the Almighty Definitive mix)
4. "New York City Boy" (music video)
- UK CD2
1. "New York City Boy" (album version)
2. "Casting a Shadow"
3. "New York City Boy" (Superchumbo's Uptown mix)
4. "Casting a Shadow" (live video from the solar eclipse of 11 August 1999)
- UK cassette single
1. "New York City Boy" (radio edit)
2. "The Ghost of Myself"
3. "New York City Boy" (The Almighty Definitive mix)
- UK 2×12-inch single

A1. "New York City Boy" (the Morales club mix)
B1. "New York City Boy" (the Almighty Man on a Mission mix)
B2. "New York City Boy" (the Lange mix)
C1. "New York City Boy" (the Thunderpuss 2000 club mix)
D1. "New York City Boy" (the Superchumbo Downtown dub)

- European CD single
1. "New York City Boy"
2. "The Ghost of Myself"
- US maxi-CD single
1. "New York City Boy" (radio edit)
2. "New York City Boy" (the Superchumbo Uptown mix)
3. "New York City Boy" (the Superchumbo Downtown dub)
4. "New York City Boy" (the Almighty Definitive mix)
5. "New York City Boy" (the Almighty Man on a Mission mix)
6. "New York City Boy" (the Thunderpuss 2000 club mix)
7. "New York City Boy" (the Thunderdub)
8. "New York City Boy" (the Morales club mix)
9. "New York City Boy" (the Lange mix)
- US 12-inch single

A1. "New York City Boy" (the Superchumbo Uptown mix)
A2. "New York City Boy" (the Almighty Definitive mix)
B1. "New York City Boy" (the Thunderpuss 2000 club mix)
B2. "New York City Boy" (the Lange mix)

- US cassette single
1. "New York City Boy" (US radio edit) – 3:31
2. "Lies" – 4:41

== Personnel ==
Personnel are adapted from the Nightlife: Further Listening 1996–2000 liner notes and Catalogue (2006).

Pet Shop Boys

- Chris Lowe
- Neil Tennant

Additional musicians

- Joey Mosk – keyboards, programming (Note: Jemtone Studio (New York))
- Vincent Montana Jr. – strings and horns arrangement, conducting
- Gene Perez – bass guitar
- Carlos Gomez – percussion
- Danny Madden – backing vocals arrangement, conducting
- Steve Abram – backing vocals
- Billy Cliff – backing vocals
- Keith Fluitt – backing vocals
- John James – backing vocals

Technical personnel

- David Morales – production
- Steve Barkan – engineering
- Bill Importico, Jr. – engineering assistant
- Jon Smeltz – strings and horns engineering (Note: The Studio (Philadelphia))
- Goetz Botzenhardt – mixing (Note: Sarm West (London))
- Pet Shop Boys – production, mixing
- Tim Young – remastering

Artwork

- Farrow Design – design
- Eric Watson – photography
- Ian MacNeil – costume design
- Versace – jackets

== Charts ==
=== Weekly charts ===
Weekly chart performance for "New York City Boy"
| Chart (1999–2000) | Peak position |
|---|---|
| Australia (ARIA) | 174 |
| Austria (Ö3 Austria Top 40) | 40 |
| Belgium (Ultratop 50 Flanders) | 20 |
| Belgium (Ultratop 50 Wallonia) | 23 |
| Denmark (Tracklisten) | 6 |
| Europe (Eurochart Hot 100 Singles) | 22 |
| Finland (Suomen virallinen lista) | 4 |
| France (SNEP) | 47 |
| Germany (GfK) | 16 |
| Greece (IFPI) | 8 |
| Hungary (MAHASZ) | 4 |
| Iceland (Íslenski Listinn Topp 40) | 26 |
| Italy (FIMI) | 20 |
| Italy Airplay (Music & Media) | 9 |
| Netherlands (Dutch Top 40) | 34 |
| Netherlands (Single Top 100) | 40 |
| Quebec (ADISQ) | 20 |
| Scottish Singles Sales (Official Charts) | 15 |
| Spain (Promusicae) | 3 |
| Sweden (Sverigetopplistan) | 9 |
| Switzerland (Schweizer Hitparade) | 20 |
| UK Singles (Official Charts) | 14 |
| US Dance Club Songs (Billboard) | 1 |
| US Dance Singles Sales (Billboard) | 4 |
| US Hot Singles Sales (Billboard) | 53 |

=== Year-end charts ===
1999 year-end chart performance for "New York City Boy"
| Chart (1999) | Position |
|---|---|
| Sweden (Hitlistan) | 97 |

2000 year-end chart performance for "New York City Boy"
| Chart (2000) | Position |
|---|---|
| US Maxi-Singles Sales (Billboard) | 31 |

== Release history ==
Release dates and formats for "New York City Boy"
| Region | Date | Format(s) | Label(s) | Ref. |
|---|---|---|---|---|
| Japan | 22 September 1999 | CD | Parlophone; EMI | |
| United Kingdom | 27 September 1999 | CD; cassette | Parlophone | |
| United Kingdom | 4 October 1999 | 2×12-inch vinyl | Parlophone | |
| Australia | 21 February 2000 | CD | Parlophone | |
