= Se a vida é (That's the Way Life Is) =

1996 single by Pet Shop Boys

Single by Pet Shop Boys

from the album Bilingual
- A-side: "To Step Aside" (US only)
- B-side: "Betrayed"; "How I Learned to Hate Rock & Roll"
- Released: 12 August 1996
- Genre: Latin pop; synth-pop
- Length: 4:02
- Label: Parlophone
- Composers: Ademario; Wellington Epiderme Negra; Nego do Barbalho; Neil Tennant; Chris Lowe
- Lyricist: Neil Tennant
- Producers: Pet Shop Boys; Chris Porter

Pet Shop Boys singles chronology
| "Before" (1996) | "Se a vida é (That's the Way Life Is)" (1996) | "Single-Bilingual" (1996) |

Music video
- "Se a vida é (That's the Way Life Is)" on YouTube

"Se a vida é (That's the Way Life Is)" is a song by English synth-pop duo Pet Shop Boys, released on 12 August 1996 as the second single from their sixth studio album, Bilingual (1996). The song is based on "Estrada Da Paixão" by African-Brazilian band Olodum, which Pet Shop Boys heard during the South American leg of their Discovery tour in 1994. The band shares songwriting credits with Pet Shop Boys. The accompanying music video was directed by Bruce Weber and shot at a water theme park in the US.

== Release ==
"Se a vida é" spent eight weeks on the UK Singles Chart, peaking at number eight, and became a top-five hit in the Czech Republic, Finland, Hungary, Israel and Spain. It topped the European Hit Radio chart, with airplay on 98 stations in 23 countries.

In the United States, the song was released in 1997 as a double A-side with "To Step Aside". This version reached number eight on the Billboard Maxi-Singles Sales chart while "To Step Aside" by itself reached number one on the Billboard Dance Club Play chart.

=== Artwork ===
The single covers (CD1 pictured) featured photos from the music video shoot at a water park, taken by Lynda Churilla. The photos were printed on a yellow background in duotone pink, blue, green, red, and orange, with flecks of spot varnish to give an effect of splashing water. The 12-inch double vinyl cover had plain panels of the same colours, with the photos on the inner sleeves. The compact discs were yellow, and the vinyl records were green for side A/B and yellow for side C/D. Designer Mark Farrow described the look as "summery and fun and wet and sexy".

== Critical reception ==
Ross Jones from The Guardian described "Se a vida é (That's the Way Life Is)" as "a sexy and vibrant song", and a "life-affirming lambada". He added that "it's still one of the freshest, most joyous things you've ever heard." Music Week gave it a full score of five out of five and named it Single of the Week. The reviewer wrote, "Superlatives aren't enough for the best Pet Shop Boys single in years. Justice demands it be the biggest of summer hits." The magazine's Alan Jones commented, "Neil Tennant's melancholic voice is usually lost in a swirl of synths, but the Pet Shop Boys' upcoming single [...] is a delightful change of style. An extremely commercial and very positive song, it features a four-piece brass section, a guitar and 20 female drummers. The latter's inclusion gives a sometimes thunderous rumble to appropriate sections of the song, but the rest is very lightweight and breezy, with a vaguely Latin flavour floating in with the brass section. Another Top 10 hit."

== Music video ==
The music video for "Se a vida é (That's the Way Life Is)" was shot at the Wet 'n Wild water theme park in Orlando, Florida, and was directed by Bruce Weber, who had also directed the video for "Being Boring" (1990). Actress Eva Mendes appeared in a small role as a teenager with her friends at the park. The video entered heavy rotation on MTV and VH1 that summer.

== Translation ==
The correct English translation of "Se a vida é" from Portuguese is actually "If Life Is...". ("That's the way life is" would be "É assim que a vida é..." or "A vida é assim".) The other Portuguese lyric is "Essa vida é..." ("This life is..."), which sounds very similar to "Se a vida é".

Neil Tennant acknowledged that he started writing the lyrics with a mistranslation of the phrase but decided he liked it as is. The addition of "Essa vida é" was intended as a more accurate way to convey "that's the way life is".

== Track listings ==
- UK and Australian CD1; Japanese maxi-CD single
1. "Se a vida é (That's the Way Life Is)" – 4:01
2. "Betrayed" – 5:18
3. "How I Learned to Hate Rock 'n' Roll" – 4:40
4. "Se a vida é (That's the Way Life Is)" (Pink Noise mix) – 5:27
- UK and Australian CD2
1. "Se a vida é (That's the Way Life Is)" (Mark Picchiotti's Deep and Dark vocal) – 7:58
2. "Se a vida é (That's the Way Life Is)" (Mark Picchiotti's Shelter dub) – 8:40
3. "Se a vida é (That's the Way Life Is)" (Deep Dish Liquid remix) – 9:57
4. "Se a vida é (That's the Way Life Is)" (Deep Dish dub) – 11:46
- UK cassette single and European CD single
1. "Se a vida é (That's the Way Life Is)" – 4:01
2. "Betrayed" – 5:17
- Japanese mini-CD single
1. "Se a vida é (That's the Way Life Is)"
2. "Go West"

US CD single

1. "Se a vida é (That's the Way Life Is)" (album version) – 4:01
2. "Se a vida é (That's the Way Life Is)" (Mark Picchiotti's Deep and Dark vocal) – 7:58
3. "To Step Aside" (album version) – 3:48
4. "To Step Aside" (Ralphie's disco vox) – 9:07
5. "The Calm Before the Storm" – 2:45
6. "Betrayed" – 5:32

US 2×12-inch single

1. "Se a vida é (That's the Way Life Is)" (Mark Picchiotti's Deep and Dark vocal) – 7:58
2. "Se a vida é (That's the Way Life Is)" (Deep Dish Liquid remix) – 9:57
3. "To Step Aside" (Ralphie's disco vox) – 9:07
4. "To Step Aside" (Hasbrouck Heights mix) – 8:50
5. "To Step Aside" (Davidson Ospina dub) – 7:30
6. "To Step Aside" (Ralphie's Old School dub) – 7:33
7. "To Step Aside" (Brutal Bill mix) – 7:50
8. "To Step Aside" (Ralphi's house vox II) – 7:32

== Personnel ==
Personnel are adapted from the Bilingual album booklet.

- Pet Shop Boys – production
  - Neil Tennant – words, music
  - Chris Lowe – music
- Ademario – music
- Wellington Epiderme Negra – music
- Nego do Barbalho – music
- J.J. Belle – guitar
- Mike Innes – brass
- Noel Langley – brass
- Richard Sidwell – brass
- Andy Hamilton – brass
- SheBoom – additional drums and percussion
- Chris Porter – production, recording, mixing
- Bob Kraushaar – recording (SheBoom)
- Pete Gleadall – programming

== Charts ==
=== Weekly charts ===
Weekly chart performance for "Se a vida é (That's the Way Life Is)"
| Chart (1996–1997) | Peak position |
|---|---|
| Australia (ARIA) | 11 |
| Austria (Ö3 Austria Top 40) | 14 |
| Belgium (Ultratop 50 Flanders) | 50 |
| Czech Republic (IFPI ČR) | 2 |
| Denmark (Tracklisten) | 9 |
| Europe (Eurochart Hot 100) | 24 |
| Europe Airplay (European Hit Radio) | 2 |
| Finland (Suomen virallinen lista) | 3 |
| France (SNEP) | 40 |
| Germany (GfK) | 18 |
| Hungary (MAHASZ) | 3 |
| Iceland (Íslenski Listinn Topp 40) | 30 |
| Israel (Israeli Singles Chart) | 1 |
| Netherlands (Dutch Top 40 Tipparade) | 11 |
| Netherlands (Single Top 100 Tipparade) | 9 |
| New Zealand (Recorded Music NZ) | 24 |
| Scottish Singles Sales (Official Charts) | 10 |
| Spain (AFYVE) | 4 |
| Sweden (Sverigetopplistan) | 12 |
| Switzerland (Schweizer Hitparade) | 17 |
| UK Singles (Official Charts) | 8 |
| US Dance Club Songs (Billboard) "To Step Aside" only | 1 |
| US Dance Singles Sales (Billboard) with "To Step Aside" | 8 |

=== Year-end charts ===
Year-end chart performance for "Se a vida é (That's the Way Life Is)"
| Chart (1996) | Position |
|---|---|
| Australia (ARIA) | 97 |
| Germany (Media Control) | 93 |
| Israel (Israeli Singles Chart) | 19 |

Year-end chart performance for "To Step Aside"
| Chart (1997) | Position |
|---|---|
| US Dance Club Play (Billboard) "To Step Aside'" | 35 |

== Release history ==
Release dates and formats for "Se a vida é (That's the Way Life Is)"
| Region | Date | Format(s) | Label(s) | Ref. |
|---|---|---|---|---|
| United Kingdom | 12 August 1996 | CD; cassette | Parlophone | |
| United Kingdom | 2 September 1996 | 2×12-inch vinyl | Parlophone | |
| Japan | 11 September 1996 | Maxi-CD | EMI; Parlophone | |
| Japan | 29 January 1997 | Mini-CD | EMI | |
