= Bilingual (album) =

Studio album by Pet Shop Boys
- Released: 2 September 1996
- Recorded: 1995–1996
- Studios: Bunk Junk & Genius (London); Sarm West (London); Sarm Hook End (Checkendon, England); Axis (New York City); Bass Hit (New York City); The State House of Broadcasting and Sound Recording (Moscow)
- Genres: Dance-pop; synth-pop; Latin
- Length: 53:56
- Label: Parlophone
- Producers: Pet Shop Boys; Chris Porter; Paul Roberts; Danny Tenaglia; Andy Williams

Pet Shop Boys chronology
Alternative (1995)	Bilingual (1996)	Essential (1998)

Singles from Bilingual
- 1. "Before" Released: 22 April 1996; 2. "Se a vida é (That's the Way Life Is)" Released: 12 August 1996; 3. "Single-Bilingual" Released: 11 November 1996; 4. "A Red Letter Day" Released: 17 March 1997

Bilingual is the sixth studio album by English synth-pop duo Pet Shop Boys, released in the United Kingdom on 2 September 1996 by Parlophone and in the United States on 10 September 1996 by Atlantic Records. The album reached number four on the UK Albums Chart, lower than their previous five studio albums which had all reached the top three. It yielded four successful singles, with three of them—"Before", "Se a vida é (That's the Way Life Is)" and "A Red Letter Day"—reaching the UK top 10; the fourth one, the English/Spanish-language composition "Single-Bilingual", peaked within the top 20.

== Background and recording ==
Bilingual continues the heavily instrumented arrangements and backing vocals Pet Shop Boys began adding to their music with the album Very (1993). As the title suggests, a number of the songs on Bilingual have international influences. On their 1994 Discovery Tour in South America, the duo were influenced by the beats and rhythms associated with Latin American music. Initially, the whole album was intended to have a Latin American sound, but the concept was not fully realised.

Three songs have bilingual lyrics, mixing English with Spanish on "Discoteca" and "Single-Bilingual" and with Portuguese on "Se a vida é", which was based on a song by the Brazilian group Olodum. "It Always Comes as a Surprise" opens with a sample of Brazilian singer Astrud Gilberto and features percussion sounds from a berimbau and cuícas. A sample of Spanish gypsy music was used on "To Step Aside", and a Russian choir sang on "A Red Letter Day". Neil Tennant described four of the songs—"Metamorphosis", "Electricity", "Before", and "Saturday Night Forever"—as a "New York dance album" within the album.

In August 1994, Pet Shop Boys started writing songs for the album, including "Discoteca", at Unique Studios, where they had originally recorded "West End Girls". While in New York, they heard live samba drums at the Sound Factory Bar, which inspired their Discovery Tour later that year. For the album, they worked with the Scottish women's drumming ensemble SheBoom, who specialised in samba rhythms, as well as samba percussionist Robin Jones.

Recording began in April 1995 and continued on and off into the following year. The duo worked at Sarm West and Bunk Junk & Genius in London, and they also set up their own studio in a rented house outside Henley-on-Thames and used nearby Sarm Hook End as well. In June 1995, they went to New York to record the single "Before" at Axis and Bass Hit studios with Danny Tenaglia, who later came to the UK to produce the track "Saturday Night Forever". Pet Shop Boys worked with producer Chris Porter on five tracks: "Se a vida é", "It Always Comes as a Surprise", "Up Against It", "The Survivors", and "To Step Aside". One track, "Metamorphosis", was produced by Paul Roberts and Andy Williams of K-Klass. In March 1996, Tennant traveled to Moscow to record the Russian choir on "A Red Letter Day" at the State House of Broadcasting and Sound Recording.

== Release ==
Prior to the album's release, Pet Shop Boys collaborated with David Bowie on the song "Hallo Spaceboy", which reached number 12 on the UK Singles Chart in February 1996. In April, Bilingual was preceded by the top 10 single "Before", followed by another hit single, "Se a vida é (That's the Way Life Is)", in August. The album was released on 2 September 1996 by Parlophone in the UK and on 10 September by Atlantic Records in the US.

=== Promotion ===
In late 1995, Pet Shop Boys ended their contract with the American branch of EMI and signed with Atlantic Records. A renewed marketing campaign was launched to promote the band in the United States via both radio airplay and club play. In May 1996, Atlantic supplied 300 clubs with import copies of "Before" ahead of the single's stateside release on 17 June, and their gay marketing division hosted a series of launch parties at gay nightclubs in cities where the duo had previous commercial success. Radio promotion was targeted at Top 40, alternative, and college stations.

Bilingual was positioned as one of Atlantic's top releases for the fourth quarter of 1996, with an aggressive pricing strategy. The label set up a Pet Shop Boys site on the World Wide Web, where at least five fansites had been created by that time. Tennant signed copies of Bilingual at an event for hundreds of fans at Tower Records on New York's Upper West Side. The marketing campaign was intended to encourage participation from the duo, who had "a reputation for being difficult, to the extent of barely helping to promote their releases", according to the music trade magazine Billboard.

In the UK, promotion for the album included advertisements in cinemas, on television, and in various print publications, as well as billboards in London. BBC Radio 1 had a Pet Shop Boys Day, and there was a Pet Shop Boys special on the BBC Two television programme The O-Zone. Tennant gave interviews to publications including Q magazine and The Sunday Times. The campaign initiated by Parlophone was deliberately designed around the album with minimal promotion by Tennant and Lowe. According to international marketing manager Carol Baxter, Pet Shop Boys were established enough that their participation was not required.

The duo made in-person appearances to support the last two singles from the album. In November 1996, they performed their new release "Single-Bilingual" along with "Se a Vida é", accompanied by SheBoom, on the popular Channel 4 show TFI Friday hosted by Chris Evans. In March 1997, Pet Shop Boys promoted "A Red Letter Day" with the only Top of the Pops studio performance of any single released from Bilingual; the previous singles had been promoted on the hit music show with their music videos. They also appeared on the ITV programme This Morning, hosted by Richard and Judy, for an interview and a preview of the music video. A two-part BBC Radio 1 documentary with the duo titled About the Pet Shop Boys aired in December 1996.

Pet Shop Boys decided to perform a series of concerts at the Savoy Theatre in London in June 1997. As promotion, they released a cover version of "Somewhere" from West Side Story as a single and on a double album, Bilingual: Special Edition, which included the original album and a bonus CD of remixes and B-sides. The single reached the UK top 10, and a performance of "Somewhere" was recorded at the Savoy for Top of the Pops.

=== Artwork ===
The CD cover (pictured) had a screen printed frosted finish of dirty varnish, with the album title in clear plastic revealing a yellow booklet and the band name through the lettering. The LP was yellow with white lettering. The concept, designed by Mark Farrow, was meant to convey luxury packaging; however, a Parlophone executive later described it as giving the message "I'm not for you" instead of "Buy me".

Rather than doing a photoshoot of the duo, informal pictures were used for the booklet and inner sleeve. The photos were in duplicate, playing on the "bi" theme. The special edition cover had a double image of the duo taken by Andy Earl. Lyrics were included in the packaging for the first time.

=== Commercial performance ===
Bilingual debuted at number four on the UK albums chart and spent nine weeks in the top 100 in 1996. The album was certified gold upon release by the British Phonographic Industry, signifying 100,000 units shipped to retailers. It had sold 81,000 copies by June 1997, at the time of their "Somewhere" residency, and by 2017, the sales total had increased to 108,054 copies in the UK.

Worldwide, Bilingual had sold 1.5 million copies by February 1997, with the top markets for the album being Italy, Germany, Spain, Brazil, and Asia. In the US, where Bilingual peaked at 39 on the Billboard 200, the album sold 149,000 copies by 2006.

=== Singles ===
"Before" was released on 22 April 1996 as the lead single from Bilingual and reached number seven in the UK. It was co-produced with Danny Tenaglia and featured Barbara Tucker, Carole Sylvan, and Karen Bernod on backing vocals. The B-sides were "Hit and Miss", "The Truck Driver and His Mate", and the 1995 version of "In the Night". The 12-inch and CD maxi-single releases were focused entirely on remixes.

The album's second single was "Se a vida é (That's the Way Life Is)", released on 12 August 1996. The title phrase, "Se a vida é", is mistranslated as "that's the way life is" (the actual meaning in Portuguese is "if life is"), but Tennant decided to keep it as is. The song was co-produced with Chris Porter and featured drums by Glasgow group SheBoom. Remixes were done by Mark Picchiotti, Deep Dish and Pink Noise. The B-sides were "Betrayed" and "How I Learned to Hate Rock 'n' Roll". The video for the song featured youthful models frolicking at a water park located in South Florida and was shot by Bruce Weber, who had also directed the music video for the duo's 1990 single "Being Boring". The single had a great deal of radio play on release, and during the summer of 1996 it spent five weeks in the UK top 40 peaking at number eight. It was released in the US in April 1997 as a double A-side single with "To Step Aside". To promote the package, 13 mixes of "To Step Aside" were commissioned, most of them released promotionally only and unreleased in the UK. "To Step Aside" was nominated for a Grammy Award for Best Dance Recording in 1998.

The third single to be released was "Single" in November 1996. It was renamed "Single-Bilingual" as Everything but the Girl had recently released a different song also called "Single". Produced by Pet Shop Boys with drums by SheBoom, the single included remixes of "Single-Bilingual" and a new mix of "Discoteca". The B-sides were "Confidential" (a demo for Tina Turner) and "The Calm Before the Storm". It peaked at number 14 in the UK.

A new version of "A Red Letter Day", featuring additional production by Steve Rodway, was released as the fourth single from Bilingual in March 1997. It features Barbara Tucker, Carole Sylvan, and Karen Bernod on backing vocals along with the Choral Academy of Moscow. The B-sides were "The Boy Who Couldn't Keep His Clothes On" and "Delusions of Grandeur". "A Red Letter Day" entered the UK Singles Chart at number nine. It fell out of the top 40 after only one week.

During this era, an additional single not part of the original Bilingual package, "Somewhere", was released to promote the duo's residency at the Savoy Theatre in London and a special edition of Bilingual. In the UK, the single charted at number nine. In the US, it was released as a double A-side with "A Red Letter Day". For the UK release, B-sides included "Disco Potential" and "The View from Your Balcony".

In late 1996, the song "Up Against It" had radio airplay in Sweden, although it had not been released as a single.

=== Reissues ===
In 2001, Pet Shop Boys reissued their first six studio albums; Bilingual was re-released as Bilingual: Further Listening 1995–1997. It was digitally remastered and included a second disc of B-sides and previously unreleased material from around the time of the album's original release. A remastered single-disc edition followed on 9 February 2009, under the title of Bilingual: Remastered, containing only the 12 tracks of the original. In 2018, a newly remastered edition of Bilingual: Further Listening 1995–1997 was released, with the same contents as the 2001 edition.

== Critical reception ==
Professional ratings
Review scores
Source	Rating
AllMusic	3/5 stars
Entertainment Weekly	B+
The Guardian	3/5 stars
NME	8/10
Pitchfork	5.9/10
Q	4/5 stars
Rolling Stone	3.5/5 stars
The Rolling Stone Album Guide	4/5 stars
Spin	8/10
The Village Voice	A−

In a 3-star review for AllMusic, Stephen Thomas Erlewine cited Bilingual as "further proof that even if the Pet Shop Boys aren't gracing the top of the charts as frequently as they did during the late '80s, they are crafting albums that are more adventurous and successful than they did when they were one of the top singles acts in pop music". Caroline Sullivan of The Guardian also gave 3 stars, elaborating: "You'd think that, after 11 years and six LPs, the Pet Shop Boys had taken their ironic-gay-disco formula as far as possible. Bilingual seems to confirm this... But—and this is what made 20 of their songs top 40 hits—it never fails to be extravagantly melodic and intelligent. You almost like it against your will".

Giving Bilingual a B+, Tom Sinclair of Entertainment Weekly called it "a near-perfect album for converting discophobes to the pleasures of dance music". Paul Verna of Billboard commented, "Another pleasant jolt of "Bilingual" is how tightly linked its rhythms are to current dance trends. It adds up to a fresher and far more commercially accessible album than the act has offered in years".

J. D. Considine of Spin rated the album 8 out of 10, saying, "Bilingual breaks new ground on tunes like "Se a Vida é", in which the earthy pulse of the percussion beautifully offsets the mannered detachment of Neil Tennant's voice—a new way to play off his usual inside/outside emotional dynamic. Only here, for the first time in eons, he sounds happy. Hopeful, even". Ryan Schreiber of Pitchfork, who gave the album 5.9 out of 10, noted: "For the first four seconds of Bilingual, I was convinced it was more of the same synthetic, electroid waste that we're so accustomed to hearing from the Boys. And that's when the strings came in. Of course, they're not real strings, but all the same, the chords played are not your standard danceable, major key chords. It's much darker than that. The drum loops begins its aggressive pounding, and you slowly begin to realize that something's changed with these guys".

In a 3.5-star review for Rolling Stone, Barney Hoskyns wrote: "The reason Pet Shop Boys have endured is that their robotic beats, campy choral arrangements and sampled, stabbing orchestration are underpinned by a deep melancholy, the special pathos of gay culture in the age of AIDS. There is an ironic sadness at work in the crisp couplets and clipped vowels of Tennant… This is the wistful, diffident intelligence of the outsider staying one step removed from a sexual melee into which he would secretly like to plunge". Likewise, Douglas Wolk of CMJ New Music Monthly observed: "The PSB's don't use disco to make people happy: they use it to recall a time of happiness, from the vantage point of a world of shattered pleasure. That's never been more clear than on Bilingual's closer, "Saturday Night Forever," a kaddish for a rainbow-lit dancefloor, celebratory, groovy and unbelievably sad".

== Track listing ==
All tracks are written by Neil Tennant and Chris Lowe, except as noted.

Original standard edition
No.	Title	Lyrics	Music	Producer(s)	Length
1.	"Discoteca"			Pet Shop Boys	4:37
2.	"Single"			Pet Shop Boys	3:48
3.	"Metamorphosis"			Paul Roberts; Andy Williams; Pet Shop Boys	4:03
4.	"Electricity"			Pet Shop Boys	4:58
5.	"Se a vida é (That's the Way Life Is)"	Tennant	Ademario; Wellington Epiderme Negra; Nego do Barbalho; Tennant; Lowe	Pet Shop Boys; Chris Porter	4:00
6.	"It Always Comes as a Surprise"			Pet Shop Boys; Porter	6:05
7.	"A Red Letter Day"			Pet Shop Boys	5:10
8.	"Up Against It"			Pet Shop Boys; Porter	4:16
9.	"The Survivors"			Pet Shop Boys; Porter	4:30
10.	"Before"			Pet Shop Boys; Danny Tenaglia	4:32
11.	"To Step Aside"			Pet Shop Boys; Porter	3:48
12.	"Saturday Night Forever"			Pet Shop Boys; Tenaglia	3:59

Notes:

- "It Always Comes as a Surprise" contains a sample of "Corcovado (Quiet Nights of Quiet Stars)", performed by Stan Getz and Astrud Gilberto.
- "Metamorphosis" contains the lyric "somebody spoke and I went into a dream", which is taken from The Beatles' song "A Day in the Life".

=== Special edition (1997) ===
Disc 2 — Bilingual Remixed
No.	Title	Writer(s)	Remixer(s)	Length
1.	"Somewhere" (extended mix)	Leonard Bernstein; Stephen Sondheim	Pet Shop Boys	10:53
2.	"A Red Letter Day" (Trouser Enthusiasts Autoerotic Decapitation mix)		Trouser Enthusiasts	9:59
3.	"To Step Aside" (Brutal Bill mix)		Bill Marquez	7:30
4.	"Before" (classic paradise mix)		Love to Infinity	7:56
5.	"The Boy Who Couldn't Keep His Clothes On" (international club mix)		Danny Tenaglia	6:06
6.	"Se a vida é" (Pink Noise mix)	Tennant; Lowe; Ademario; do Barbalho; Negra	Richard Morel	5:37
7.	"Discoteca" (Trouser Enthusiasts Adventure Beyond the Stellar Empire mix)		Trouser Enthusiasts	9:30

Japan bonus tracks
No.	Title	Remixer(s)	Length
8.	"Discoteca" (PSB extended mix)	Pet Shop Boys	7:02
9.	"Paninaro '95" (12″ Tin Tin Out mix)	Tin Tin Out	7:47

=== Remastered edition (2001) ===
Disc 2 — Further Listening 1995–1997
No.	Title	Writer(s)	Length
1.	"Paninaro '95"		4:11
2.	"In the Night" (1995)		4:18
3.	"The Truck-Driver and His Mate"		3:33
4.	"Hit and Miss"		4:07
5.	"How I Learned to Hate Rock 'n' Roll"		4:38
6.	"Betrayed"		5:20
7.	"Delusions of Grandeur"		5:04
8.	"Discoteca" (single version)		5:14
9.	"The Calm Before the Storm"		2:48
10.	"Discoteca" (new version)		3:47
11.	"The Boy Who Couldn't Keep His Clothes On" (Danny Tenaglia international club mix)		6:09
12.	"A Red Letter Day" (expanded single version)		5:36
13.	"The View from Your Balcony"		3:44
14.	"Disco Potential"		4:07
15.	"Somewhere" (extended mix)	Bernstein; Sondheim	10:55

Notes:

- "Discoteca" (single version) and "A Red Letter Day" (expanded single version) were previously unreleased.
- "The Boy Who Couldn't Keep His Clothes On" (Danny Tenaglia international club mix) and "Somewhere" (extended mix) are identical to the versions featured on the 1997 reissue.

== Personnel ==
Credits adapted from the liner notes of Bilingual.

Pet Shop Boys

- Neil Tennant
- Chris Lowe

Additional musicians

- Pete Gleadall – programming (tracks 1, 2, 4, 5, 7–9, 11, 12)
- SheBoom – drums, percussion (tracks 1, 2); additional drums, percussion (track 5)
- Robin Jones – additional percussion (track 1); percussion (track 6)
- Davide Giovanni – additional vocals (track 1)
- Joseph De Jesus – additional vocals (track 1)
- Weston Foster – additional vocals (track 1)
- Lino Rocha – additional vocals (track 1)
- Sylvia Mason-James – vocals (track 3)
- Simon Cotsworth – programming (track 3)
- Ritchie Birkett – keyboards (track 3)
- Trevor Henry/Ignorants – scratching, additional keyboards (track 3)
- Kevin Robinson – brass (track 3)
- Bud Beadle – brass (track 3)
- Fayyaz Virji – brass (track 3)
- Mike Innes – brass (track 5)
- Noel Langley – brass (track 5)
- Richard Sidell – brass (track 5)
- Andy Hamilton – brass (tracks 5, 6); saxophone (track 9)
- J.J. Belle – guitar (track 5)
- Chris Cameron – additional keyboards (tracks 6, 9); string arrangement, string conducting (track 9)
- Hugh Burns – guitar (track 6)
- Katie Kissoon – additional vocals (tracks 6, 9)
- The Choral Academy of Moscow – choir (track 7)
- Victor Popov – choir direction (track 7)
- Graeme Perkins – choir coordination (track 7)
- Alyosha Zolotukhin – choir arrangement (track 7)
- Barbara Tucker – additional vocals (tracks 7, 10)
- Karen Bernod – additional vocals (tracks 7, 10)
- Carole Sylvan – additional vocals (tracks 7, 10)
- Johnny Marr – guitar, additional vocals (track 8)
- Greg Bone – guitar (track 9)
- Andy Duncan – drums, percussion (track 9)
- Danny Tenaglia – drum programming (track 10)
- Louie "Balo" Guzman – drum programming (track 10)
- Peter Daou – keyboards (track 10)
- Phil Pagano – programming (track 10)
- Eddie Montilla – additional keyboards (track 12)

Technical

- Pet Shop Boys – production
- Bob Kraushaar – engineering (tracks 1, 2, 4, 7); mixing (tracks 1, 2, 4, 7, 8, 11)
- Paul Roberts – production (track 3)
- Andy Williams – production (track 3)
- Simon Cotsworth – engineering (track 3)
- Chris Porter – production, recording (tracks 5, 6, 8, 9, 11); mixing (tracks 5, 6, 9)
- Tatyana Vinnitskaya – choir recording (track 7)
- Danny Tenaglia – production (tracks 10, 12)
- Dana Vlcek – recording, mix engineering (track 10)
- Rob Rives – engineering assistance (tracks 10, 12)
- Rich Lowe – engineering (track 12)
- Doug DeAngelis – mix engineering (track 12)
- Claire Tonkinson – recording assistance
- Andrew Green – recording assistance
- Tom Elmhirst – recording assistance

Artwork

- Mark Farrow Design – sleeve
- Pet Shop Boys – sleeve
- Chris Heath – photography
- José Cea – photography

=== Further Listening 1995–1997 ===
Credits adapted from the liner notes of Bilingual: Further Listening 1995–1997.

Additional musicians

- Pete Gleadall – programming (tracks 1–8, 10, 12, 13–15)
- Oli Savill – percussion (track 1)
- Lilliana Chacian – percussion (track 1)
- Sylvia Mason-James – additional vocals (tracks 2, 3)
- SheBoom – drums, percussion (track 8)
- Robin Jones – additional percussion (track 8)
- Katie Kissoon – additional vocals (tracks 8, 10)
- Davide Giovanni – additional vocals (tracks 8, 10)
- Joseph De Jesus – additional vocals (tracks 8, 10)
- Weston Foster – additional vocals (tracks 8, 10)
- Lino Rocha – additional vocals (tracks 8, 10)
- Danny Tenaglia – drum programming (track 11)
- Louie "Balo" Guzman – drum programming (track 11)
- Peter Daou – keyboards (track 11)
- Vanessa Ichak – Banji girl vocals (track 11)
- The Choral Academy of Moscow – choir (track 12)
- Victor Popov – choir direction (track 12)
- Graeme Perkins – choir coordination (track 12)
- Alyosha Zolotukhin – choir arrangement (track 12)
- Richard Niles – orchestra arrangement, orchestra conducting (track 15)

Technical

- Pet Shop Boys – production
- Bob Kraushaar – engineering (tracks 1–9, 13–15); mixing (tracks 1–8, 13–15)
- Pete Gleadall – engineering (track 4)
- Pete Schwier – engineering, mixing (track 10)
- Danny Tenaglia – production (track 11)
- Doug DeAngelis – mix engineering (track 11)
- Steve Rodway – additional production (track 12)
- Mike "Spike" Drake – mixing (track 12)
- Tatyana Vinnitskaya – choir recording (track 12)
- Throusers Enthusiasts – additional production (track 15)
- Steve Price – orchestra recording (track 15)
- Claire Tonkinson – recording assistance
- Andrew Green – recording assistance
- Tom Elmhirst – recording assistance
- Tim Young – 2001 & 2018 remastering

The sampled lines in "Electricity" were taken from the 1942 film My Gal Sal and were spoken by Rita Hayworth. The film happened to be playing on television while the track was being recorded, and was not publicly identified until 2019.

== Charts ==
=== Weekly charts ===
Weekly chart performance for Bilingual
Chart (1996)	Peak position
Australian Albums (ARIA)	3
Austrian Albums (Ö3 Austria)	15
Belgian Albums (Ultratop Flanders)	28
Belgian Albums (Ultratop Wallonia)	10
Canada Top Albums/CDs (RPM)	18
Danish Albums (Hitlisten)	11
Dutch Albums (Album Top 100)	59
European Albums (Music & Media)	10
Finnish Albums (Suomen virallinen lista)	14
French Albums (SNEP)	45
German Albums (Offizielle Top 100)	7
Hungarian Albums (MAHASZ)	14
Italian Albums (Musica e dischi)	22
Japanese Albums (Oricon)	23
New Zealand Albums (RMNZ)	25
Norwegian Albums (VG-lista)	25
Portuguese Albums (AFP)	4
Scottish Albums (Official Charts)	10
Spanish Albums (AFYVE)	15
Swedish Albums (Sverigetopplistan)	4
Swiss Albums (Schweizer Hitparade)	11
UK Albums (Official Charts)	4
US Billboard 200	39

=== Year-end charts ===
Year-end chart performance for Bilingual
Chart (1996)	Position
German Albums (Offizielle Top 100)	88

== Certifications and sales ==
Certifications and sales for Bilingual
Region	Certification	Certified units/sales
Brazil	—	60,000
Japan (RIAJ)	Gold	100,000^{^}
Spain (Promusicae)	Platinum	100,000^{^}
United Kingdom (BPI)	Gold	108,054
United States	—	149,000
Summaries
Worldwide	—	1,500,000
^{^} Shipments figures based on certification alone.

== Release history ==
Release history for Bilingual
Region	Date	Format	Label
United Kingdom	2 September 1996	Standard	Parlophone
United States	10 September 1996	Standard	Atlantic
United Kingdom	7 July 1997	Limited	Parlophone
