= Pandemonium Tour =

2009–10 concert tour by Pet Shop Boys

- Tour by Pet Shop Boys
- Poster to the concert in Paris
- Location: Europe; North America; South America; Asia
- Associated album: Yes
- Start date: 10 June 2009
- End date: 8 December 2010
- Legs: 5
- No. of shows: 89

Pet Shop Boys concert chronology
- Fundamental Tour (2006–07); Pandemonium Tour (2009–10); Electric Tour (2013–15)

The Pandemonium Tour was a worldwide concert tour by English synth-pop duo Pet Shop Boys in support of their tenth studio album Yes (2009). It was named for the album track "Pandemonium". The setlist featured songs from the new album as well as older hits and lesser-known tracks interwoven in a 90-minute sequence. The music was produced by Stuart Price, and the tour was designed by Es Devlin, who also designed the duo's previous Fundamental Tour. The Pandemonium Tour visited Europe, the Americas, and Asia between 2009 and 2010, with additional performances of the production in 2011 and 2012. A live album and concert film titled Pandemonium was released in 2010.

== Background and itinerary ==
Leading up to the release of Yes in March 2009, Pet Shop Boys were honoured for their Outstanding Contribution to Music at the Brit Awards on 18 February. They performed a medley of songs arranged by Price, with a set designed by Devlin. The award show coincided with the first announcement of concerts, at the Manchester Apollo and London's O2 Arena on 18 and 19 June. Devlin's team began pre-production on the tour straight away.

=== 2009 ===
The Pandemonium Tour opened in Russia on 10 June 2009 with a concert at the Ice Palace in Saint Petersburg, followed by a show at Luzhniki Stadium in Moscow. The production toured Europe in June and July, including several festivals: Roskilde in Denmark, Oxegen in Ireland, T in the Park in Scotland, Latitude in Suffolk, England, and the Dour Festival in Belgium. The summer leg ended in Israel with a one-off concert in Tel Aviv.

In autumn 2009, the tour headed to North America, with shows across Canada and the United States from late August through September. Two dates in Mexico were followed by a tour of South America in October, visiting Chile, Brazil, Argentina, and Peru. A show scheduled in Venezuela was cancelled for logistical reasons, and a stop in the Dominican Republic was also called off because of problems with the venue.

The tour returned to Europe at the end of the year. In December, Pet Shop Boys played six additional dates in Germany, bringing the total to ten there for the tour so far. Two concerts in Ukraine were cancelled due to restrictions during the swine flu pandemic.

Back in the UK, the tour visited Glasgow, Birmingham, and Manchester before returning to The O2 in London on 21 December. The shows coincided with the release of the Pet Shop Boys' Christmas EP, and the songs "It Doesn't Often Snow at Christmas" and a cover of "My Girl" were added to the setlist for those dates. The O2 show was recorded for a live album and concert film, titled Pandemonium, which was released in February 2010.

=== 2010 ===
The Pandemonium Tour resumed in the summer of 2010 at Primavera Sound in Barcelona, followed by a stop in Italy and a series of European festivals. Pet Shop Boys headlined the Other Stage at Glastonbury on Saturday, 26 June. In July, they appeared at Balaton Sound in Hungary, Tollwood Festival in Germany, Super Bock Super Rock in Portugal, and Splendour in Nottingham in England. The tour also visited five UK cities, including Chris Lowe's hometown Blackpool, where the duo added the Dave Clark Five song "Glad All Over" to their setlist in honour of Blackpool F.C. being promoted to the Premier League.

The tour headed to Asia at the end of July 2010 for two dates. On their first visit to Taiwan, Pet Shop Boys were asked to headline the new TWinkle Rock Festival for their "elaborate and artful stage design and production, which almost takes on Broadway proportions". In Korea, they headlined the second night of the Jisan Valley Rock Festival. In the UK at the end of August, the duo performed in both locations of the two-day V Festival in Staffordshire and Chelmsford. Their final festival of 2010 was Xacobeo in Santiago de Compostela, Spain, on 27 August. Taking the stage at 1 a.m., Pet Shop Boys showed no lack of energy, according to Público reviewer Rocío Ponce, despite it being the last stop on their European tour.

In December 2010, Pet Shop Boys staged a Pandemonium performance at the Hammersmith Apollo for a special Big Noise Session of the Little Noise Sessions benefiting Mencap, a charity for people with learning disabilities. Added to the setlist were the new Pet Shop Boys single "Together" from their compilation album Ultimate (2010) and the holiday song "It Doesn't Often Snow at Christmas".

=== 2011–2012 ===
From May to July 2011, Pet Shop Boys were the supporting act on Take That's Progress Live tour. They played a 40-minute set that included highlights from their Pandemonium Tour. Designer Es Devlin was also part of the creative team for Take That's set.

The Pandemonium Tour did not go on the road again, but the production was used for four more performances, which were successively expected to be the last Pandemonium show as they were announced: a New Year's Eve concert on Glebe Island in Australia in 2011, the Afisha Picnic festival in Moscow on 21 July 2012, and a pair of concerts in Norway at the Døgnvill Festival in Tromsø on 24 August and, finally, at the Rått og Råde Festival in Stavanger on 25 August 2012. Pet Shop Boys debuted a new concert series, the Electric Tour, in 2013.

== Production ==
=== Set and lighting ===
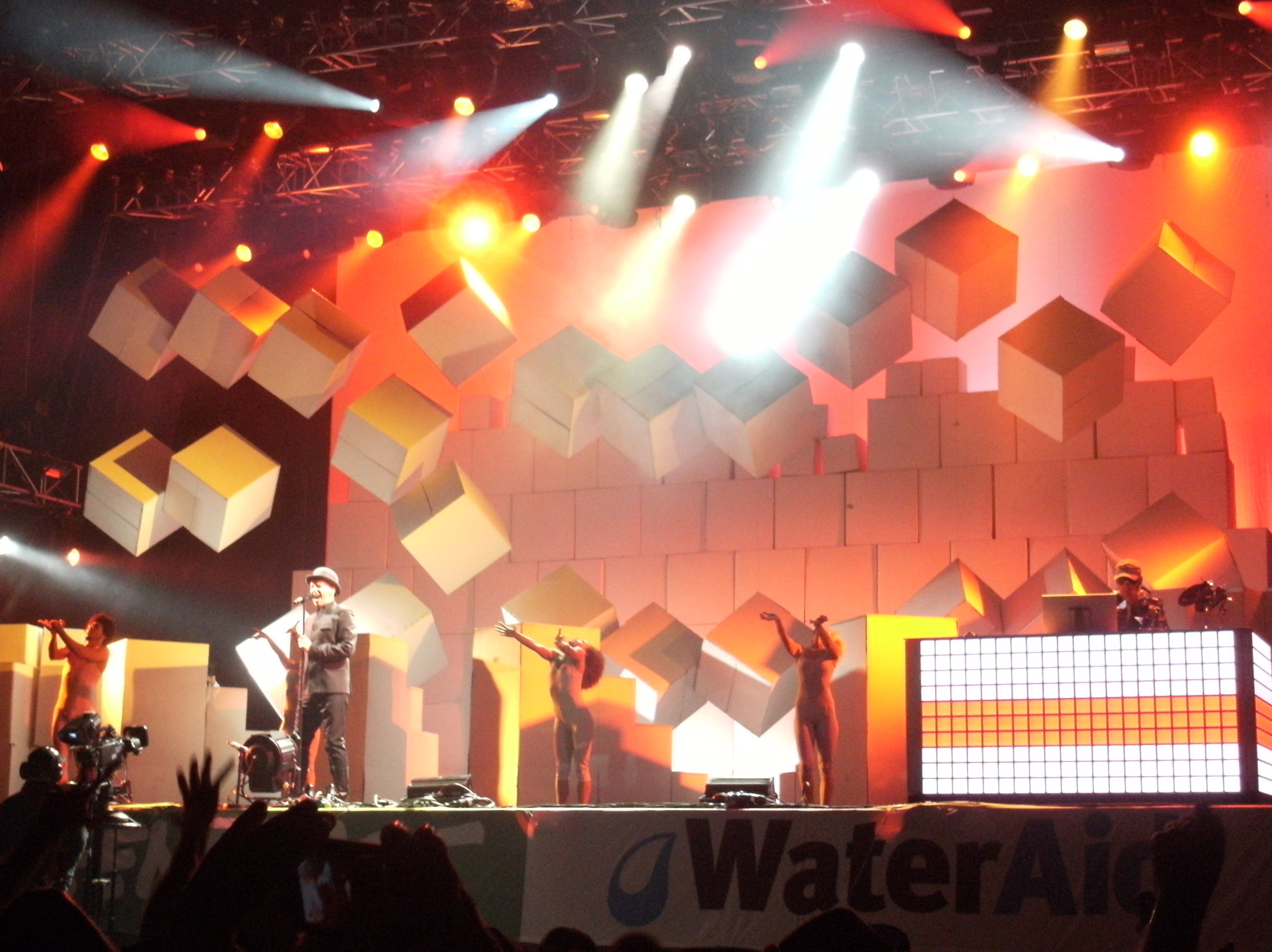
Cubes above the stage on the Pandemonium Tour

Cubes were the main design component of the tour, used in both the set and costumes. The concept came from the Yes album artwork of a checkmark made of different colored squares, which in turn had been inspired by the Cologne Cathedral Window created by Gerhard Richter. Set designer Es Devlin came up with the idea of using cardboard boxes, measuring 40 cm square and 80 cm square.

The set was composed of around 300 white boxes that changed configuration throughout the show. Two walls of boxes were used as video screens that collapsed at the end of the first act, revealing more boxes. Dancers wore brightly coloured boxes over their heads and moved on and around the box structures, which were periodically rearranged by crew members in white coats and hard hats. Pulleys were used to suspend boxes above the stage. The set was adaptable to different-sized venues, from rock festivals to theatres. The boxes needed to be replaced frequently and were susceptible to bad weather.

The video content was designed by Sam Pattinson and Luke Halls of onedotzero, who had also worked on the Brit Awards performance. The tour video featured newly created material as well as footage from Pet Shop Boys music videos and other sources. The display was projected onto the boxes. A DJ booth onstage was clad in LED light tiles that were part of the visual display.

Lighting designer Rob Sinclair used a simple setup of four straight overhead trusses and two sidelight trusses, in part to make it easy to source from local suppliers. Floor lights were not feasible because of moving and falling boxes. The overall concept was a that of musical instead of a rock concert, and the goal was to allow the video projections to stand out while adequately lighting the performers.

=== Music and performance ===
The music for the Pandemonium Tour was inspired by the "Brits Medley", arranged for the award ceremony by Stuart Price and Pet Shop Boys, which condensed highlights of their career in under 10 minutes. For the tour, the duo went through their back catalogue with Price, who helped them select, sequence, and arrange a setlist of extended medleys. The 90-minute show was divided into four parts: an introduction, a New York section, a ballad ballet, and a celebration.

The first act mainly featured songs from Yes, including elements of "More than a Dream" in show opener "Heart" (1987); the album's second single "Did You See Me Coming?"; the titular "Pandemonium" blended with "Can You Forgive Her?" (1993); lead single "Love Etc."; and "Building a Wall", which closed out the act as giant projections of the duo's heads were bricked up behind coloured squares before the box wall collapsed.

Act two highlighted the duo's early days in New York City. The set included two songs from their debut album Please (1986) that had never been played on tour, "Two Divided by Zero" and "Why Don't We Live Together?" City scenes were used in the video backdrop, and the dancers were dressed as buildings.

The third act of downbeat numbers opened with a keyboard solo by Chris Lowe on "Do I Have To?" (1987), followed by "King's Cross" (1987) set to Derek Jarman's film from the MCMLXXXIX Tour (1989). During "The Way It Used to Be" from Yes, dancers Sean Williams and Charlotte Walcott played out a lovers' quarrel that continued into "Jealousy" (1990) and ended with them throwing boxes at each other.

Act four was a celebration with upbeat songs, including a Latin-themed medley of "Se a vida é (That's the Way Life Is)" and "Discoteca" (1996) with "Domino Dancing" (1988) leading into the Coldplay hit "Viva la Vida" (2008). Alluding to the latter's lyrics, Neil Tennant was dressed as a king in a robe and crown, and a video showed him walking around the Bronze Horseman statue of Peter the Great, filmed at their first tour stop in Saint Petersburg.

The standard encore was "Being Boring" (1990) and "West End Girls" (1985), with other songs occasionally added, such as "It Doesn't Often Snow at Christmas" for December concerts.

=== Performers and costumes ===
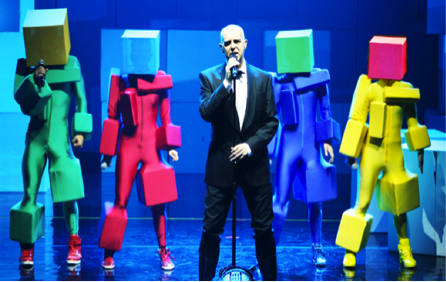
Neil Tennant with dancers in cube costumes on the Pandemonium Tour

The touring company included four dancers with musical theatre backgrounds: Sophie and Polly Duniam, Sean Williams, and Charlotte Walcott. Helena Dowling substituted for Walcott when she was unavailable in 2010. Choreographer Lynne Page created stylistically diverse routines that helped carry a narrative through the four acts.

The dancers also provided backing vocals. Dusty Springfield's original vocals were used for the duet "What Have I Done to Deserve This?" (1987). Pete Gleadall was the programmer and music director for the tour.

Tennant was mainly centre stage, singing and interacting with the dancers. Lowe was positioned stage left in a DJ booth that housed a master keyboard and a Moog synthesizer. He also used a Kaoss Pad to add effects and played a set of electronic drums. He briefly left his booth to join the dancers in the second act.

Tennant and Lowe had their heads covered with colorful cubes for their entrance and the opening number. The Duniams first appeared in full cube costumes, wearing unitards with cube-shaped protrusions, and they kept their cube headwear on until act four, when they revealed themselves to be twins. The dancers rotated through a variety of costumes, from business suits to athletic wear. Tennant had a jacket made in the style of an "Elizabethan spy"; his costume changes included a tux for the slow numbers. Lowe had a mirrored coat and a cube coat, custom-made by primary costume designer Jeffrey Bryant.

== Critical reception ==
The Independent described the show at the Empress Ballroom as "an imaginative mix of hi-tech and lo-tech, from LED to cardboard, from dancing skyscrapers to Gilbert & George-inspired projections on to a Lego-like edifice which, quite brilliantly, is then smashed like something out of Pink Floyd's The Wall". El Mundo reviewer Leticia Blanco reported from Primavera Sound in Barcelona that the duo exceeded expectations and delivered one of the most ecstatic performances of the entire festival, with a sublime staging that took the concept of entertainment to another dimension.

The audience response was enthusiastic in Taiwan, where "The beats kept everyone dancing (the floor at the exhibition hall literally shook)", according to the Taipei Times. At the Jisan Valley Rock Festival, The Korea Times observed, "Though the duo has been making music for three decades, their staying power for even today's youth was demonstrated by a group of teenage girls, dressed up in color-coordinated outfits in homage".

Some reviewers had issues with the sound. A Financial Times reviewer felt the production was initially overwhelmed by the venue at The O2 Arena and that the "sound also struggled to fill the space, which flattened Tennant's vocals and thinned Lowe's synths", but noted that things picked up as the show continued. The Independent complained that it was too quiet, but wondered "how many decibels they'd need to drown out a crowd who belt out 'Heart' and 'Always on My Mind' like they're national anthems".

== Set list ==
1. "Heart" (Stuart Price Mix) – contains elements of "More Than a Dream" (Magical Dub)
2. "Did You See Me Coming?"
3. "Pandemonium"/"Can You Forgive Her?"
4. "Love Comes Quickly" (June–July 2009 shows only)
5. "Love etc."
6. "Building a Wall"/"Integral"
7. "Go West"
8. "Two Divided by Zero"
9. "Why Don't We Live Together?"
10. "New York City Boy" (Added August 2009)
11. "Always on My Mind"
12. "Closer to Heaven"/"Left to My Own Devices"
13. "Do I Have To?"
14. "King's Cross"
15. "The Way It Used to Be"
16. "Jealousy"
17. "Suburbia"
18. "What Have I Done to Deserve This?" (Added November 2009)
19. "All Over the World"
20. "Se a vida é (That's the Way Life Is)"/"Discoteca"/"Domino Dancing"/"Viva la Vida"
21. "It's a Sin"

Encore

1. "Being Boring"
2. "West End Girls"

Additional encore songs

1. "My Girl" (17–21 December 2009 only)
2. "It Doesn't Often Snow at Christmas" (December 2009–10 shows only)
3. "Glad All Over" (13 July 2010 only)
4. "Together" (8 December 2010 only)

== Tour dates ==
| Date | City | Country | Venue |
|---|---|---|---|
Europe
| 10 June 2009 | Saint Petersburg | Russia | Ice Palace |
| 11 June 2009 | Moscow | Russia | Luzhniki Stadium |
| 13 June 2009 | Esch-sur-Alzette | Luxembourg | Rockhal |
| 14 June 2009 | Stuttgart | Germany | Theaterhaus Stuttgart |
| 15 June 2009 | Zurich | Switzerland | MAAG Halle |
| 18 June 2009 | Manchester | England | Manchester Apollo |
| 19 June 2009 | London | England | O2 Arena |
| 22 June 2009 | Amsterdam | Netherlands | Heineken Music Hall |
| 24 June 2009 | Cologne | Germany | Palladium |
| 25 June 2009 | Berlin | Germany | Tempodrom |
| 26 June 2009 | Leipzig | Germany | Parkbühne |
| 28 June 2009 | Stockholm | Sweden | Cirkus |
| 30 June 2009 | Gothenburg | Sweden | Eriksbergshallen |
| 2 July 2009 | Helsinki | Finland | Old Ice Hall |
| 4 July 2009 | Roskilde | Denmark | Roskilde Festival |
| 7 July 2009 | Barcelona | Spain | Poble Espanyol |
| 8 July 2009 | Madrid | Spain | Palacio Vistalegre |
| 11 July 2009 | Punchestown Racecourse | Ireland | Oxegen Festival |
| 12 July 2009 | Balado | Scotland | T in the Park |
| 13 July 2009 | Liverpool | England | Echo Arena |
| 15 July 2009 | Paris | France | Olympia |
| 17 July 2009 | Suffolk | England | Latitude Festival |
| 18 July 2009 | Dour | Belgium | Dour Festival |
Asia
| 21 July 2009 | Tel Aviv | Israel | Trade Fairs & Convention Center |
North America
| 29 August 2009 | Montreal | Canada | Metropolis |
| 30 August 2009 | Toronto | Canada | Virgin Festival |
| 1 September 2009 | New York City | United States | Hammerstein Ballroom |
| 2 September 2009 | New York City | United States | Hammerstein Ballroom |
| 3 September 2009 | Washington, D.C. | United States | Constitution Hall |
| 5 September 2009 | Boston | United States | House of Blues |
| 6 September 2009 | Atlantic City | United States | House of Blues |
| 9 September 2009 | Miami | United States | Fillmore Miami Beach |
| 10 September 2009 | Tampa | United States | Tampa Bay Performing Arts Center |
| 11 September 2009 | Orlando | United States | House of Blues |
| 12 September 2009 | Atlanta | United States | Chastain Park |
| 14 September 2009 | Chicago | United States | Chicago Theatre |
| 15 September 2009 | Milwaukee | United States | Pabst Theater |
| 16 September 2009 | Minneapolis | United States | State Theater |
| 19 September 2009 | Vancouver | Canada | Chan Centre for the Performing Arts |
| 20 September 2009 | Seattle | United States | Moore Theatre |
| 22 September 2009 | San Francisco | United States | The Warfield |
| 23 September 2009 | San Francisco | United States | The Warfield |
| 24 September 2009 | Los Angeles | United States | Greek Theatre |
| 26 September 2009 | Las Vegas | United States | The Joint |
| 29 September 2009 | Monterrey | Mexico | Arena Monterrey |
| 1 October 2009 | Mexico City | Mexico | National Auditorium |
South America
| 7 October 2009 | Santiago | Chile | Movistar Arena |
| 9 October 2009 | Belo Horizonte | Brazil | Chevrolet Hall |
| 11 October 2009 | Brasília | Brazil | Marina Hall |
| 13 October 2009 | São Paulo | Brazil | Credicard Hall |
| 14 October 2009 | Rio de Janeiro | Brazil | Citibank Hall |
| 16 October 2009 | Buenos Aires | Argentina | Club Ciudad de Buenos Aires |
| 20 October 2009 | Lima | Peru | Jockey Club del Perú |
Europe
| 20 November 2009 | Athens | Greece | Metropolitan Expo |
| 21 November 2009 | Thessaloniki | Greece | P.A.O.K. Sports Arena |
| 29 November 2009 | Zagreb | Croatia | Dražen Petrović Basketball Hall |
| 1 December 2009 | Bratislava | Slovakia | NTC Arena |
| 2 December 2009 | Vienna | Austria | Gasometer |
| 3 December 2009 | Prague | Czech Republic | Tesla Arena |
| 5 December 2009 | Berlin | Germany | O2 World |
| 6 December 2009 | Rostock | Germany | Stadthalle |
| 8 December 2009 | Copenhagen | Denmark | KB Hallen |
| 9 December 2009 | Hamburg | Germany | Congress Center Hamburg |
| 11 December 2009 | Magdeburg | Germany | Bördelandhalle |
| 12 December 2009 | Münster | Germany | Halle Münsterland |
| 14 December 2009 | Frankfurt | Germany | Jahrhunderthalle |
| 15 December 2009 | Antwerp | Belgium | Lotto Arena |
| 17 December 2009 | Glasgow | Scotland | Scottish Exhibition and Conference Centre |
| 18 December 2009 | Birmingham | England | National Indoor Arena |
| 20 December 2009 | Manchester | England | Manchester Arena |
| 21 December 2009 | London | England | O2 Arena |
Europe
| 29 May 2010 | Barcelona | Spain | Primavera Sound |
| 23 June 2010 | Pavia | Italy | Castello Visconteo |
| 26 June 2010 | Glastonbury | England | Glastonbury Festival |
| 8 July 2010 | Lake Balaton | Hungary | Balaton Sound |
| 10 July 2010 | Munich | Germany | Tollwood Festival |
| 13 July 2010 | Blackpool | England | Empress Ballroom |
| 16 July 2010 | Sesimbra | Portugal | Super Bock Super Rock |
| 19 July 2010 | Brighton | England | Brighton Centre |
| 20 July 2010 | Bournemouth | England | Bournemouth International Centre |
| 21 July 2010 | Cardiff | Wales | Cardiff International Arena |
| 23 July 2010 | Newcastle upon Tyne | England | Metro Radio Arena |
| 24 July 2010 | Nottingham | England | Splendour in Nottingham |
Asia
| 29 July 2010 | Taipei | Taiwan | Nangang Exhibition Hall |
| 31 July 2010 | Icheon | South Korea | Jisan Valley Rock Festival |
Europe
| 21 August 2010 | Staffordshire | England | V Festival |
| 22 August 2010 | Chelmsford | England | V Festival |
| 27 August 2010 | Santiago de Compostela | Spain | Auditorio Monte do Gozo |
| 8 December 2010 | London | England | Hammersmith Apollo |

=== Additional performances ===
| Date | City | Country | Venue |
|---|---|---|---|
| 31 December 2011 | Sydney | Australia | Glebe Island |
| 21 July 2012 | Moscow | Russia | Kolomenskoye |
| 24 August 2012 | Tromsø | Norway | Døgnvill Festival |
| 25 August 2012 | Stavanger | Norway | Rått og Råde Festival |

=== Cancelled dates ===
| Date | City | Country | Venue | Reason |
|---|---|---|---|---|
| 22 October 2009 | Caracas | Venezuela | Estadio de Fútbol USB | Logistical issues |
| 24 October 2009 | Santo Domingo | Dominican Republic | Palacio de los Deportes | Problems with the venue |
| 24 November 2009 | Odesa | Ukraine | Palace of Sports | Swine flu pandemic |
| 25 November 2009 | Kyiv | Ukraine | Palace of Sports | Swine flu pandemic |

== Personnel ==
Credits adapted from the Pet Shop Boys Pandemonium On Tour 2009/2010 programme (2009) and "Creating Pandemonium for the Pet Shop Boys, Part 1: The Designers' Roundtable" (Battaglia, 2009).

Pet Shop Boys

- Neil Tennant
- Chris Lowe

Dancers/Backing vocalists

- Sophie Duniam
- Polly Duniam
- Sean Williams
- Charlotte Walcott
- Helena Dowling (2010)

Design team

- Es Devlin – creative direction, set design, costume design
- Stuart Price – tour music producer
- Rob Sinclair – lighting design
- Lynne Page – choreography
- Sam Pattinson – video design
- Luke Halls – video design
- Jeffrey Bryant – costume design
- Carisa Glucksman – costume design
- Pet Shop Boys – costume design

Tour personnel

- Pete Gleadall – music director, programmer
- Andy Crookston – tour manager
- Joe Sanchez – production manager
- Jim Webb – stage manager
- Holger Schwark – front of house sound engineer
- Seamus Fenton – monitor engineer
- Hansi Kecker – MIDI/keyboard tech
- Roger Cabot – head set carpenter
- Tom Keane – set carpenter
- Garry Dunn – set carpenter
- Robyn Tearle – video projection
- Danielle Dowden – make-up, tour assistant
- Truckstar – lead truck driver
- Phil Laycock – tour bus driver

Additional personnel

- Bronia Housman – set design associate
- Machiko Hombu – set design assistant
- Signe Beckmann – set design assistant
- Anna Josephs - costume assistant
- Nicholas Cunningham – associate choreographer
- Jodie Martin – assistant choreographer

Video collaborators/animators

- Blinkin Lab
- Mark Hough
- Damian Hale
- Jan Urbanowski
- Luke Halls
- Mike Chan
