= Ultimate (Pet Shop Boys album) =

Greatest hits album by Pet Shop Boys
- Released: 1 November 2010
- Recorded: 1985–2010
- Genre: Synth-pop, electropop
- Length: 78:55
- Label: Parlophone

Pet Shop Boys chronology
Pandemonium (2010)	Ultimate (2010)	The Most Incredible Thing (2011)

Singles from Ultimate
- 1. "Together" Released: 24 October 2010

Ultimate is a greatest hits compilation album by the English synth-pop duo Pet Shop Boys, released on 1 November 2010 by their long-time label Parlophone. It was the duo's third greatest hits album in the UK, following PopArt: The Hits (2003). The album contains 18 previously released singles from the first 25 years of their career and one new song, "Together". A special edition included a DVD with live performances of 27 songs from various BBC programmes and the duo's complete set at Glastonbury 2010.

== Background and compilation ==
Ultimate was released to celebrate 25 years since the band's first hit single, "West End Girls", in 1985. It was aimed at casual fans and was packaged as one CD. The tracks are in chronological order, ranging from the duo's earliest hits through "Love Etc." from their most recent album at the time, Yes (2009).

Notable omissions include "Opportunities (Let's Make Lots of Money)" and "Rent". Some songs that were left off the album were on the special edition DVD as performances from Top of the Pops and other television programmes, as well as a 90-minute set of 21 songs and medleys at Glastonbury on 26 June 2010.

"Together" was a new song written especially for Ultimate. The track was made available as a digital download on 24 October 2010, and a single containing two cover tracks and an extended version of the song was released as a digital bundle and on CD on 29 November.

== Release ==
Ultimate charted at number 27 on the UK Albums Chart on 7 November 2010, with first-week sales of 8,886 copies. On the European Top 100 Albums it reached number 50 on 20 November 2010. The album was certified gold with at least 100,000 sales in the UK in March 2016. It has continued to chart periodically on the UK Album Downloads Chart, reaching a peak position of four in November 2024.

== Critical reception ==
Professional ratings
Review scores
Source	Rating
AllMusic	4/5 stars
DIY	4/5 stars
PopMatters	7/10

Assessing the value of Ultimate as a greatest hits compilation, David Jeffries of AllMusic commented, "By 2010, the Pet Shop Boys' discography had grown to such a size that any one-disc compilation was bound to just scratch the surface, and that's what Ultimate does, splendidly". He noted, "Casual fans get to catch up on important late-period singles they probably missed". Ian Wade of BBC Music observed, "What Ultimate offers is highlights from every album in a pleasingly ordered tracklisting ensuring that anyone who may've switched off around the mid-90s gets a taster of later treats such as New York City Boy, Home And Dry and last year's sublime Love etc." Michael Horton of DIY called Ultimate, "A pretty bundle but, as a third greatest hits, a bit of a stretch. Still, whatever the quibbles about motivation, there isn't too much wrong with the rest of the package".

Nick Bond of the Star Observer noted, "Arriving only two albums after their last compilation, 2003's essential Pop/Art, Ultimate might seem a slightly perfunctory release, were it not for the fantastic DVD accompanying the deluxe edition". Simon Rueben of The Line of Best Fit suggested that the DVD should have been the main release and commented, "... PopArt – The Hits really showed the world how a great singles compendium can be done... New release Ultimate is the opposite, a rather shallow collection that barely scratches the surface of their glorious career".

Michael Edwards of Exclaim! wrote: "Ultimate never gets close to living up to its title; it loses a bunch of great songs, such as "Love Comes Quickly" and "So Hard," so it can fit on a single CD, replacing them with lesser songs from later albums and the one obligatory new song. It just isn't the best representation of the band's career". Josh Langhoff of PopMatters concurred, "As a single disc compilation, Ultimate lives up to that audacious adjective worse than any album in recorded history..." He added, "However redundant, Ultimate Pet Shop Boys still contains eight or nine bounce-off-the-walls, think-about-life, luxuriate-in-sound great songs".

== Track listing ==
All tracks are written by Neil Tennant and Chris Lowe, except where noted.

Ultimate track listing
No.	Title	Writer(s)	Original album	Length
1.	"West End Girls" (2001 remaster)		Please (1986)	4:05
2.	"Suburbia" (2010 remaster)		Please	4:01
3.	"It's a Sin" (2001 remaster)		Actually (1987)	5:00
4.	"What Have I Done to Deserve This?" (with Dusty Springfield; 2001 remaster)	Tennant; Lowe; Allee Willis	Actually	4:20
5.	"Always on My Mind" (2003 remaster)	Wayne Carson; Johnny Christopher; Mark James	non-album single (1987)	3:57
6.	"Heart" (2010 remaster)		Actually	4:17
7.	"Domino Dancing" (2003 remaster)		Introspective (1988)	4:18
8.	"Left to My Own Devices" (2001 remaster)		Introspective	4:45
9.	"Being Boring" (2001 remaster)		Behaviour (1990)	4:51
10.	"Where the Streets Have No Name (I Can't Take My Eyes off You)" (2003 remaster)	Paul Hewson; David Evans; Larry Mullen; Adam Clayton; Bob Crewe; Bob Gaudio	non-album single (1991)	4:32
11.	"Go West" (radio edit)	Jacques Morali; Henri Belolo; Victor Willis; Tennant; Lowe	Very (1993)	5:02
12.	"Before" (2001 remaster)		Bilingual (1996)	4:05
13.	"Se a vida é (That's the Way Life Is)" (2001 remaster)	Ademario; Wellington Epiderme Negra; Nego do Barbalho; Tennant; Lowe	Bilingual	4:01
14.	"New York City Boy" (US radio edit; 2003 remaster)	Tennant; Lowe; David Morales	Nightlife (1999)	3:20
15.	"Home and Dry" (2003 remaster)		Release (2002)	3:58
16.	"Miracles" (radio edit)	Tennant; Lowe; Adam F; Dan Fresh Stein	PopArt: The Hits (2003)	3:55
17.	"I'm with Stupid"		Fundamental (2006)	3:27
18.	"Love Etc."	Tennant; Lowe; Brian Higgins; Miranda Cooper; Tim Powell; Owen Parker	Yes (2009)	3:31
19.	"Together" (Ultimate mix)	Tennant; Lowe; Powell	previously unreleased	3:30
Total length:				78:55

=== Special edition DVD ===
BBC TV performances
No.	Title	Writers	Programme	Airdate
1.	"West End Girls"		Top of the Pops	05/12/85
2.	"Love Comes Quickly"	Tennant; Lowe; Stephen Hague	Top of the Pops	20/03/86
3.	"Opportunities (Let's Make Lots of Money)		The Old Grey Whistle Test	29/04/86
4.	"Suburbia"		Top of the Pops	02/10/86
5.	"It's a Sin"		Top of the Pops	25/06/87
6.	"Rent"		Top of the Pops	22/10/87
7.	"Always on My Mind"	Carson; Christopher; James	Top of the Pops	10/12/87
8.	"What Have I Done to Deserve This?" (with Dusty Springfield)	Tennant; Lowe; A. Willis	Brit Awards	08/02/88
9.	"Heart"		Wogan	30/03/88
10.	"Domino Dancing"		Top of the Pops	22/09/88
11.	"Left to My Own Devices"		Top of the Pops	01/12/88
12.	"So Hard"		Wogan	28/09/90
13.	"Being Boring"		Top of the Pops	29/11/90
14.	"Can You Forgive Her?"		Top of the Pops	10/06/93
15.	"Liberation"		Top of the Pops	07/04/94
16.	"Paninaro '95"		Top of the Pops	03/08/95
17.	"Se a Vida é (That's the Way Life Is)"	Ademario; Negra; do Barbalho; Tennant; Lowe	Top of the Pops 2	02/12/03
18.	"A Red Letter Day"		Top of the Pops	28/03/97
19.	"Somewhere"	Leonard Bernstein; Stephen Sondheim	Top of the Pops	04/07/97
20.	"I Don't Know What You Want But I Can't Give It Any More"		Top of the Pops	30/07/99
21.	"New York City Boy"	Tennant; Lowe; Morales	Top of the Pops	08/10/99
22.	"You Only Tell Me You Love Me When You're Drunk"		Top of the Pops	14/01/00
23.	"Home and Dry"		Top of the Pops	29/03/02
24.	"I Get Along"		Top of the Pops 2	17/04/02
25.	"Miracles"	Tennant; Lowe; Fenton; Stein	Top of the Pops	14/11/03
26.	"Flamboyant"		Top of the Pops	19/03/04
27.	"I'm with Stupid"		Top of the Pops	23/04/06

Glastonbury Festival 2010
No.	Title	Writers
1.	"More Than a Dream"; "Heart"	Tennant; Lowe; Cooper; Higgins; Jason Resch; Kieran Jones; Tennant; Lowe
2.	"Did You See Me Coming?"	
3.	"Love Etc."	Tennant; Lowe; Higgins; Cooper; Powell; Parker
4.	"Building a Wall"	
5.	"Go West"	Morali; Belolo; V. Willis; Tennant; Lowe
6.	"Two Divided by Zero"	Tennant; Bobby Orlando
7.	"Why Don't We Live Together?"	
8.	"New York City Boy"	Tennant; Lowe; Morales
9.	"Always on My Mind"	Carson; Christopher; James
10.	"Closer to Heaven"; "Left to My Own Devices"	
11.	"Do I Have To?"	
12.	"King's Cross"	
13.	"The Way It Used to Be"	Tennant; Lowe; Cooper; Higgins; Nick Coler
14.	"Jealousy"	
15.	"Suburbia"	
16.	"What Have I Done to Deserve This?"	Tennant; Lowe; A. Willis
17.	"All Over the World"	
18.	"Se a vida é"; "Discoteca"; "Domino Dancing"; "Viva la Vida"	Ademario; Negra; do Barbalho; Tennant; Lowe; Tennant; Lowe; Tennant; Lowe; Guy Berryman; Jonny Buckland; Will Champion; Chris Martin
19.	"It's a Sin"	
20.	"Being Boring"	
21.	"West End Girls"	

== Charts ==
Chart performance for Ultimate
Chart (2010)	Peak position
Belgian Albums (Ultratop Flanders)	71
Belgian Albums (Ultratop Wallonia)	47
European Albums (Billboard)	50
German Albums (Offizielle Top 100)	35
Mexican Albums (Top 100 Mexico)	93
Spanish Albums (Promusicae)	42
Swedish Albums (Sverigetopplistan)	46
Swiss Albums (Schweizer Hitparade)	73
UK Albums (OCC)	27
