= Party (Pet Shop Boys album) =

Greatest hits album by Pet Shop Boys
- Released: 4 November 2009
- Recorded: 1986–2009
- Genre: Pop; synth-pop
- Length: 79:19
- Label: Som Livre

Pet Shop Boys chronology
Yes (2009)	Party (2009)	Christmas (2009)

Party is a compilation album by Pet Shop Boys, released exclusively in Brazil on 4 November 2009.

The album was released to coincide with the Brazilian leg of their 2009 Pandemonium tour. The album includes both past hits and some newer material. Party includes songs that were heavily featured in the following TV Globo soap operas: "Being Boring" (Meu Bem, Meu Mal OST), "Domino Dancing" (O Salvador da Pátria OST), "West End Girls" (Selva de Pedra OST) and "King of Rome" (Viver a Vida OST).

Several mistakes have occurred with the track listing. For example, "West End Girls" appears in its original 7" form, contrary to the labeling as the 10" version. "Paninaro '95" was included on the album, yet placed as track 3 and labelled as the 7" mix. Also, the original 1992 7" version of "Go West" appears on the album, a rare inclusion as it has not appeared on any Pet Shop Boys compilations so far. All the mistakes were fixed on later pressings of the compilation, since April 2010. Due to all the fixed mistakes on the later pressings, some edits had to be made for all 16 tracks to fit on one Compact Disc. After the mistakes were fixed, the compilation totaled 79:19, leaving just 41 seconds left on a standard CD. Five tracks were smoothly edited to fit on the album: the 10-inch version of "West End Girls" lost 15 seconds; "Love Comes Quickly" lost 4 seconds; "What Have I Done to Deserve This?" lost 7 seconds; the album version of "Go West" lost 18 seconds and "Love etc." lost 17 seconds.

== Track listing ==
1. "West End Girls" (10") – 6:50 - 3:58*
2. "Love Comes Quickly" – 4:10 - 4:14*
3. "Paninaro" (7") – 4:37 - 4:09**
4. "It's a Sin" (Disco Mix) – 7:38
5. "What Have I Done to Deserve This?" – 4:09 - 4:16*
6. "Always on My Mind" (extended dance version) – 8:09
7. "Domino Dancing" – 4:16
8. "It's Alright" (7" version) – 4:19
9. "Being Boring" (edit) – 4:50
10. "Go West" – 4:44*** - 4:18****
11. "Before" (single edit) – 4:04
12. "New York City Boy" (album version) – 5:16
13. "Home and Dry" (radio edit) – 3:54
14. "Minimal" (radio edit) – 3:34
15. "Love etc." – 3:14 - 3:31*
16. "King of Rome" – 5:31
- Seven-inch version (7" Mix), as it appears on the first 10,000 copies of the album (AA0010000).*
- Album version with an edited ending, replaced on subsequent re-issues with the previous Original 1992 Mix.***
- Original 1992 Mix, available on the first edition only.****
