= Beautiful People (Pet Shop Boys song) =

Single by Pet Shop Boys

from the album Yes
- B-side: "Fugitive" (seven-inch mix)
- Released: 2 October 2009
- Recorded: 2008
- Studio: Xenomania (Westerham, Kent); Abbey Road (London)
- Genre: Orchestral pop; folk rock
- Length: 3:42
- Label: Parlophone
- Songwriters: Neil Tennant; Chris Lowe
- Producers: Brian Higgins; Xenomania

Pet Shop Boys singles chronology
"Did You See Me Coming?" (2009)	"Beautiful People" (2009)	"Love Life" (2010)

"Beautiful People" is a song by English synth-pop duo Pet Shop Boys, released on 2 October 2009 as the third and final single from their tenth studio album, Yes (2009). Initially, the single was released in Germany only, at the request of EMI. On 10 November, it was released digitally in the United States. The single peaked at number 65 in Germany, and it reached number 3 on Billboard magazine's Dance Singles Sales chart in the US.

== Background and recording ==
Pet Shop Boys originally wrote the track as a theme song for the television programme Beautiful People (2008) at the request of series writer Jonathan Harvey, with whom the duo had collaborated on the musical Closer to Heaven (2001). The song was rejected because the producers wanted something more uptempo.

Neil Tennant wrote the lyrics from the point of view of a woman waiting for a bus in the rain, looking at celebrity magazines at a newsstand and aspiring to that lifestyle. He described it as a different perspective on the same theme as their earlier single, "Love Etc.", which also deals with celebrity and materialism.

During the recording sessions for Yes, the Xenomania production team helped give the song a 1960s sound, adding drums and guitars. The backing vocals were intended to be reminiscent of The Mamas & the Papas. Guest musicians on the track included former Smiths guitarist Johnny Marr, who also played harmonica, and singers Carla Marie Williams, Jessie Malakouti, and Alex Gardner. Owen Pallett wrote an orchestral arrangement for the song, performed by the London Metropolitan Orchestra and recorded at Abbey Road Studios.

== Release ==
The single package of "Beautiful People" included three bonus tracks that had been previously released in some form. The seven-inch mix of "Fugitive", produced by Richard X, had been published in an extended version on the limited edition of their 2006 album Fundamental. The demo version of "Beautiful People" had been made available to stream from the official Pet Shop Boys website in July 2009. The remix of "Up and Down" by Tom Stephan was also available as a free download during the release campaign of "Did You See Me Coming?"; the original version was a B-side of that single.

Remixes by Vinny Vero were commissioned but not used due to delays in their completion. They were later released unofficially as a free download on Vero's website.

Pet Shop Boys' original demo of "Beautiful People" was also included on the 2017 expanded reissue Yes: Further Listening 2008–2010.

== Track listing ==
All tracks are written by Neil Tennant and Chris Lowe.

- German CD maxi single / German & US digital EP
1. "Beautiful People" – 3:43
2. "Fugitive" (seven-inch mix) – 3:30
3. "Beautiful People" (demo) – 3:22
4. "Up and Down" (Tom Stephan remix) – 7:56

== Personnel ==
Credits adapted from the liner notes of Yes: Further Listening 2008–2010 and "Beautiful People"

Pet Shop Boys

- Chris Lowe – keyboards and programming
- Neil Tennant – vocals, keyboards and programming

Additional musicians

- Pete Gleadall – keyboards and programming
- Tim Powell – keyboards and programming, backing vocals
- Owen Parker – guitar, keyboards and programming, backing vocals
- Matt Gray – keyboards and programming
- Kieran Jones – guitar, keyboards and programming
- Nick Coler – guitar, keyboards and programming
- Jason Resch – guitar, keyboards and programming
- Johnny Marr – guitar, harmonica
- Carla Marie Williams – backing vocals
- Jessie Malakouti – backing vocals
- Alex Gardner – backing vocals
- London Metropolitan Orchestra
- Cathy Thompson – orchestra leader
- Owen Pallett – orchestral arrangement
- Andy Brown – conducting

Technical personnel

- Brian Higgins/Xenomania – production
- Jeremy Wheatley – mixing
- Dick Beetham – mastering
- Andy Dudman – orchestra recording

Artwork

- Farrow and PSB – design and art direction

== Charts ==
Chart performance for "Beautiful People"
Chart (2009–2011)	Peak position
Germany (GfK)	65
Slovakia (Rádio Top 100)	74
US Dance Singles Sales (Billboard)	3
US Hot Singles Sales (Billboard)	7
