= Story: 25 Years of Hits =

Greatest hits album by Pet Shop Boys
- Released: 8 March 2009
- Recorded: 1986–2009
- Genre: Synth-pop
- Length: 53:16
- Label: Parlophone

Pet Shop Boys chronology
| Disco 4 (2007) | Story: 25 Years of Hits (2009) | Yes (2009) |

Story: 25 Years of Hits is a compilation album released by the English synth-pop duo Pet Shop Boys. It was released in March 2009 as a promotion for their forthcoming album Yes, with the UK Sunday newspaper The Mail on Sunday. The album included 10 hit singles and one new song from Yes, "Did You See Me Coming?"

The newspaper approached Pet Shop Boys' record company, EMI, with the idea. There was renewed interest in their music due to their performance at the 2009 Brit Awards, where they were honoured for Outstanding Contribution to Music. The duo agreed in hopes of reaching a portion of the Mail's readership; Neil Tennant likened the album to a Trojan horse accompanying the newspaper.

Pet Shop Boys chose the songs, and Mark Farrow designed the sleeve, with illustrations by Gary Stillwell depicting Tennant and Lowe in different costumes from over the years.

== Track listing ==
All tracks are written by Neil Tennant and Chris Lowe, except where noted.

| No. | Title | Producer(s) | Length |
|---|---|---|---|
| 1. | "West End Girls (10-inch mix)" | Stephen Hague | 7:04 |
| 2. | "Paninaro (7-inch mix)" | Pet Shop Boys | 4:40 |
| 3. | "It's a Sin (Disco mix)" | Hague | 7:41 |
| 4. | "What Have I Done to Deserve This? (7-inch mix)" (Tennant/Lowe/Willis) | Hague | 4:19 |
| 5. | "Jealousy (7-inch mix)" | Pet Shop Boys and Harold Faltermeyer | 4:15 |
| 6. | "Being Boring (7-inch mix)" | Pet Shop Boys and Faltermeyer | 4:50 |
| 7. | "Go West (7-inch mix)" (Tennant/Lowe/Belolo/Morali/Willis) | Pet Shop Boys | 5:01 |
| 8. | "Before (7-inch mix)" | Pet Shop Boys and Danny Tenaglia | 4:07 |
| 9. | "Home and Dry (7-inch mix)" | Pet Shop Boys | 3:59 |
| 10. | "Flamboyant (7-inch mix)" | Pet Shop Boys, Tomcraft and Felix J, Stuart Crichton | 3:38 |
| 11. | "Did You See Me Coming?" | Brian Higgins and Xenomania | 3:42 |
| Total length: | | | 53:16 |
