= James Masterton =

British music journalist (born 1973)

James Masterton (born 2 September 1973) is a British music critic and columnist. He is the creator of Chart Watch UK, a website tracking the UK singles chart. Masterton is also a producer for Talksport, and has worked on air as a presenter at the Bradford independent local radio station the Pulse.

== Music writing ==
Masterton began posting his weekly comments about the latest singles chart on Usenet in 1992, while a student at Lancaster University, whence he graduated in 1994. In 1995 he became an important element of BT's Dotmusic website, an online hub for the UK music scene and one of the few sites that posted the entire UK top 75 every week. When Dotmusic was purchased from BT by Yahoo! on 28 October 2003, Masterton's commentary moved to Yahoo! Launch with it, remaining with the site as it transformed into Yahoo! Music UK and Ireland until the site's closure in September 2011. His chart column moved to About.com, where it remained until the summer of 2016. It finally moved to its own site, Chart Watch UK, where it has been a weekly fixture ever since. To coincide with the move the complete archives were put online, featuring many articles which had been unavailable since their original week of publication.

Masterton has come into conflict in the past for his strident views on the work of particular veteran acts, and in particular for his criticism of fan-inspired chart campaigns. In 2009, he was openly critical of the campaign to get Rage Against the Machine to number one for Christmas, denouncing the record ("Killing in the Name") as having been "purchased by people for what it represents rather than as a reflection of its cultural popularity" and provoked anger amongst fans of the Pet Shop Boys for asking "why they continue to bother" when their album Yes was released.

=== Music Week charts analysis ===
On 28 February 2020, Masterton published his UK charts analysis page (week ending: 5 March 2020) to Chart Watch UK, intending the post to be his last weekly edition, as he was hired to take over the weekly Charts Analysis review pages from Alan Jones on the Music Week website (with the feature also appearing weekly in the magazine until Future Publishing turned it into a monthly). Masterton wrote two weekly Charts Analysis pages for the website (as the magazine now features charts compiled from monthly sales and streams) until 29 October 2021, when Music Week staff took over the job. After Andre Paine and Ben Homewood wrote one each of the Charts Analysis posts on 5 November 2021, Jones took over his old job, writing the 12 November overviews (with the pages titled Charts analysis: ABBA's Voyage opens with huge sale of 204,000 for the albums and Charts analysis: Adele spends fourth week at summit ahead of album release for the singles).

Apart from an overview of the Christmas (week ending: 31 December 2020 and 7 January 2021) and Easter charts (week ending: 8 April 2021) posted as there was no updates by Music Week due to the holidays, Masterton did not return to writing a regular column on his Chart Watch UK review pages until 6 November 2021, when he posted the 11 November overview with facts about Adele's number one single "Easy On Me", Ed Sheeran's new album and Halloween associated records in the charts.

== Media appearances ==
Masterton has made numerous appearances on TV and radio as an authority on music and chart matters. He has appeared on BBC News 24's Zero 30 programme, as a talking head on the Channel 4 programme 100 Worst Pop Records and on the BBC News Channel segment E24.
