= Bad Sister =

Bad Sister, The Bad Sister or Bad Sisters may refer to:

== Film and television ==
- Bad Sister (1931 film), American drama starring Conrad Nagel and Sidney Fox
- The White Unicorn, 1947 British drama film released in the United States as Bad Sister
- Bad Sister (2014 film), Mandarin-language Chinese romantic comedy directed by Kim Tae-kyun
- Bad Sister, 1998 American pornographic feature starring Shayla LaVeaux
- Bad Sister, 2016 American television film starring Alyshia Ochse, Devon Werkheiser, and Ryan Newman
- The Bad Sister, 1983 British television feature directed by English film theorist Laura Mulvey
- Bad Sisters, 2022 Irish black comedy television series

== Literature ==
- The Bad Sister, 1978 book by Scottish-English author Emma Tennant
- The Bad Sister, 2005 book by English writer and broadcaster Denise Robertson
- Bad Sisters, 2011 novel by Rebecca Chance

== Music ==
- Bad Sister (album) (1989), by American hip-hop vocalist Roxanne Shanté

== See also ==
- Three Bad Sisters (1956), American drama film directed by Gilbert Kay
- "Big Bad Sister", on the 1991 album Act Like You Know by rapper MC Lyte
- "Good Sister/Bad Sister", on the 1991 album Pretty on the Inside by Hole
- My Bad Sister, 2010s English musical duo of twins Polly and Sophie Duniam
