= Pandemonium (Pet Shop Boys album) =

Live album by Pet Shop Boys
- Released: 15 February 2010
- Recorded: 21 December 2009, The O2 Arena, London
- Genre: Synth-pop
- Label: Parlophone
- Director: David Barnard

Pet Shop Boys chronology
Christmas (2009)	Pandemonium (2010)	Ultimate (2010)

Pet Shop Boys video chronology
Cubism (2007)	Pandemonium (2010)	Inner Sanctum (2019)

Professional ratings
Review scores
Source	Rating
AllMusic	3.5/5 stars
BBC Music	Favourable
PopMatters	8/10
Slant Magazine	3/5 stars

Pandemonium is the second live album by English synth-pop duo Pet Shop Boys. It was released on 15 February 2010 by Parlophone as a CD and DVD combo. It is a recording of a live concert at The O2 Arena in London on 21 December 2009, as part of the duo's Pandemonium Tour. The DVD includes the full Pandemonium show filmed by David Barnard. The sound was produced and remixed for DVD by Dave Woolley. The CD, mixed by Stuart Price, includes 17 songs from the show.

== Track listing ==
=== CD ===
1. "More Than a Dream"/"Heart" – 4:23
2. "Did You See Me Coming?" – 3:41
3. "Pandemonium"/"Can You Forgive Her?" – 4:05
4. "Love Etc." – 3:14
5. "Go West"/"Paninaro" – 3:55
6. "Two Divided by Zero" – 3:46
7. "Why Don't We Live Together?"/"In The Night"/"Left to My Own Devices" – 4:17
8. "New York City Boy" – 2:51
9. "Always on My Mind" – 3:43
10. "Closer to Heaven"/"Left to My Own Devices"/"Heart" – 5:40
11. "Do I Have To?" – 3:14
12. "King's Cross" – 5:11
13. "Suburbia" – 5:12
14. "Se a vida é"/"Discoteca"/"Domino Dancing"/"Viva la Vida" – 6:01
15. "It's a Sin" – 5:04
16. "Being Boring" – 5:17
17. "West End Girls" – 5:15

=== DVD ===
1. "More Than a Dream"/"Heart" – 4:22
2. "Did You See Me Coming?" – 3:39
3. "Pandemonium"/"Can You Forgive Her?" – 4:25
4. "Love Etc." – 3:17
5. "Building a Wall" – 1:49
6. "Go West" – 3:55
7. "Two Divided by Zero" – 3:46
8. "Why Don't We Live Together?" – 4:19
9. "New York City Boy" – 2:50
10. "Always on My Mind" – 3:50
11. "Closer to Heaven"/"Left to My Own Devices" – 5:38
12. "Do I Have To?" – 3:57
13. "King's Cross" – 4:18
14. "The Way It Used to Be" – 5:05
15. "Jealousy" – 4:37
16. "Suburbia" – 5:20
17. "What Have I Done to Deserve This?" – 4:36
18. "All Over the World" – 3:40
19. "Se a vida é"/"Discoteca"/"Domino Dancing"/"Viva la Vida" – 6:02
20. "It's a Sin" – 5:37
21. "Being Boring" – 6:17
22. "West End Girls" – 5:20

==== DVD extras ====
1. "My Girl" (live at The O2)
2. "It Doesn't Often Snow at Christmas" (live at The O2)
3. "Love Etc." (music video)
4. "Did You See Me Coming?" (music video)
5. "All Over the World" (music video)
6. 2009 Brit Awards performance (featuring Lady Gaga and Brandon Flowers)
7. Audio commentary by Pet Shop Boys and Es Devlin

== Charts ==
Chart (2010)	Peak position
Austrian Albums (Ö3 Austria)	75
Belgian Albums (Ultratop Flanders)	100
Belgian Albums (Ultratop Wallonia)	41
Croatian International Albums (HDU)	27
Czech Albums (ČNS IFPI)	12
French Albums (SNEP)	183
German Albums (Offizielle Top 100)	22
Greek International Albums (IFPI)	14
Japanese Albums (Oricon)	192
Mexican Albums (Top 100 Mexico)	41
Scottish Albums (OCC)	39
Spanish Albums (PROMUSICAE)	14
Swedish Albums (Sverigetopplistan)	41
Swiss Albums (Schweizer Hitparade)	87
UK Albums (OCC)	29
