= Home Farm Twins =

Children's book series by Jenny Oldfield

- Genre: Children, Comedy
- Country of origin: United Kingdom
- Original language: English
- No. of series: 3
- No. of episodes: 30

Production
- Running time: 30 minutes

Original release
- Network: CBBC
- Release: 7 January 1999 – 30 March 2000

Home Farm Twins is a series of children's books written by Jenny Oldfield. The books were later successfully adapted into a television series for the BBC, with Polly Duniam and Sophie Duniam cast as the twins. The television series proved so popular that the books were re-packaged as TV tie-ins.

== The books ==
1. Speckle the Stray
2. Sinbad the Runaway
3. Solo the Homeless
4. Susie the Orphan
5. Spike the Tramp
6. Snip and Snap the Truants
7. Sunny the Hero
8. Socks the Survivor
9. Stevie the Rebel
10. Samson the Giant
11. Sultan the Patient
12. Sorrel the Substitute
13. Skye the Champion
14. Sugar and Spice the Pickpockets
15. Sophie the Show-Off
16. Silky the Foundling
17. Scott the Braveheart
18. Spot the Prisoner
19. Shelley the Shadow
20. Star the Surprise

Specials
Scruffy the Scamp
Stanley the Troublemaker
Smokey the Mystery
Stalky the Mascot
Samantha the Snob

At Stonelea
Mitch goes Missing
Maisea wants her Mum
Mac Climbs a Mountain

== Television series ==
The television series ran for three series from 7 January 1999 until 30 March 2000 with repeats of the three seriess shown in 2001.

Home Farm Twins follows the adventures of twins Hannah and Helen around the local countryside in this series dramatized by Elly Brewer from the Home Farm books by Jenny Oldfield.

The first series started with the Moore family moving from London to the country village of Doveton. Hannah is a dreamer and an idealist, much more 'girly' than her tomboy sister Helen, who is more outspoken, daring and sarcastic.

The girls quickly got to know the locals and began a long-term friendship with Sam from Crackpot Farm, who teased them for being 'townies' but still loved to join in their adventures. Sam had dreams elsewhere and dropped a bombshell on the twins during Season 3 by announcing he was to leave Doveton.

The twins' mother, Mary, is famous for making cakes at the Curlew Cafe, the business she started after moving to Doveton. Her husband, David, is a wildlife photographer and studies animals. The twins' parents had a baby girl during Series 3. The girls learnt that animals were no longer the only ones who needed looking after and promptly watched their baby sister on numerous occasions, getting into big trouble for regular accidents involving their methods. The final series ended with the twins facing the realities of growing up and looking back at their time spent living on Home Farm and wondering about their future.

=== Television series cast ===
- Polly Duniam as Hannah Moore
- Sophie Duniam as Helen Moore
- Jacquetta May as Mary Moore
- Martin Ball as David Moore
- Ben Evans as Sam
