= Christmas (Pet Shop Boys EP) =

EP by Pet Shop Boys
- Released: 14 December 2009
- Genre: Disco-pop; electropop
- Length: 22:45
- Label: Parlophone
- Producer: Marius de Vries; Pet Shop Boys; Stuart Price

Pet Shop Boys chronology
Party (2009)	Christmas (2009)	Pandemonium (2010)

Christmas is an extended play (EP) by English synth-pop duo Pet Shop Boys. It was released on 14 December 2009 by Parlophone. Leading with the single "It Doesn't Often Snow at Christmas", it reached number 40 on the UK Singles Chart.

== Background and compilation ==
The EP contains new versions of Pet Shop Boys' exclusive 1997 fan club single "It Doesn't Often Snow at Christmas" and the track "All Over the World" from their tenth studio album Yes, both of which featured additional production by Marius de Vries with an orchestra and choir. Also included are two versions of the Madness song "My Girl" – which the duo had originally performed at a benefit concert for the late Dainton Connell – and a medley of Pet Shop Boys' 1988 song "Domino Dancing" with Coldplay's 2008 song "Viva la Vida", as performed on the Pandemonium Tour (2009–10). Stuart Price produced the latter track.

== Release ==
"All Over the World" was released to radio stations as a promotional recording and was given its first airing on Chris Evans's BBC Radio 2 show on 9 November 2009. "It Doesn't Often Snow at Christmas" followed in the first week of December on the Ken Bruce show. Both songs were on the primary A-list at Radio 2.

The Christmas EP sold 9,250 copies in the UK in its first week. The lead-off track, "It Doesn't Often Snow at Christmas", debuted at number 40 on the UK Singles Chart on 26 December 2009, and is to date the last Pet Shop Boys single to have entered the UK top 40.

The EP was released as a digital download in the US by Astralwerks on 15 December 2009. It hit number 20 on Billboard magazine's Top Dance Albums chart on 2 January 2010.

The video for "All Over the World" was directed by Blue Leach and features live highlights from the Pandemonium Tour. It was posted online a few days prior to the EP's release.

The cover artwork continues the balloon motif from the Brazilian compilation Party.

== Critical reception ==
In a review of the EP, Andy Gill of The Independent commented, "the only bona fide Christmas song featured here is "It Doesn't Often Snow at Christmas" … whose exquisitely downbeat title hook offers a typically slightly-disappointed take on the usual meteorological cliché. A brief burst of chimes and choir leads into glum social-realist depictions of "families fighting around a plastic tree, nothing on the TV that you want to see" and the like, rescued from Grinch-hood at the last moment by the company of one's beloved". On Blogcritics, David R. Perry said of the same song: "In typical PSB style, it's more cheeky than sentimental, but it is a fun track. The style is classic, Very-era disco pop, and finds the Boys doing the holiday release thing without actually selling out".

Perry described the cover of "My Girl" as having "a very lighthearted and bouncy-pop feel", while the remix has "a more club-friendly groove". Of the Coldplay cover, he observed: "taking on more rock-oriented tracks isn't their strength. Although it sounds very distinctly Pet Shop Boys and deadpan, it makes the track more sterile than it needs to be. It's fun, but it's a trifle". Tom Hocknell of BBC Music found "Viva la Vida" to be "an effective interpretation ... which comes across as more fun than one might expect from a Coldplay cover". He felt, "the real find here is the hymn-like, All Over the World, a single-in-waiting from their last album Yes. This new version is huge, as though a request for one coach-load of orchestra was obviously misheard as three. It is OTT, but admirably restrained in camp".

== Live performances ==
The release of Christmas coincided with four UK dates of the Pandemonium Tour. "It Doesn't Often Snow at Christmas" and "My Girl" were added to the setlist for those dates, in an encore that featured dancing Christmas trees and a snow shower. The mashup of "Viva la Vida"/"Domino Dancing" was also included as part of the regular tour setlist. The performance at The O2 Arena in London was recorded for a live album and concert film, titled Pandemonium, which was released in February 2010.

== Track listing ==
No.	Title	Writer(s)	Producer(s)	Length
1.	"It Doesn't Often Snow at Christmas" (new version)	Neil Tennant; Chris Lowe	Marius de Vries; Pet Shop Boys	3:51
2.	"My Girl"	Mike Barson	Pet Shop Boys	3:43
3.	"All Over the World" (new version)	Tennant; Lowe	de Vries; Pet Shop Boys	3:49
4.	"Viva la Vida"/"Domino Dancing"	Guy Berryman; Jonny Buckland; Will Champion; Chris Martin; Tennant; Lowe	Stuart Price; Dave Emery^{[a]}	5:33
5.	"My Girl" (Our House mix)	Barson	Pet Shop Boys	5:49
Total length:				22:45

=== Notes ===
- ^{^[a]} signifies an assistant producer

== Personnel ==
Personnel are adapted from the liner notes of Christmas.

=== Musicians ===
- Matt Robertson – new programming, orchestral arrangements (tracks 1, 3)
- Jason Boshoff – new programming (tracks 1, 3)
- Chris Storr – trumpet solo (tracks 1, 3)
- Pete Gleadall – original programming (track 1); programming (tracks 2)
- Stuart Price – arrangements (track 4)
- Pet Shop Boys – arrangements (track 4)
- Marius de Vries – orchestral arrangements (tracks 1, 3)
- Perry Montague-Mason – leader of the orchestra (tracks 1, 3)
- Jenny O'Grady – choirmaster (tracks 1, 3)

=== Technical ===
- Pet Shop Boys – original track production (track 1); new production (tracks 1, 3); production (tracks 2, 5); remix (track 5)
- Marius de Vries – new production (tracks 1, 3)
- Tim Weidner – mixing (tracks 2, 5)
- Brian Higgins – original track production (track 3)
- Xenomania – original track production (track 3)
- Stuart Price – production, mixing (track 4)
- Dave Emery – production assistance (track 4)
- Gary Thomas – orchestra and choir recording (tracks 1, 3)
- Mat Bartram – orchestra and choir recording assistance (tracks 1, 3)
- Andy Bradfield – orchestra and choir mixing (tracks 1, 3)
- Mo Hausler – orchestra and choir mixing assistance (tracks 1, 3)
- Izzy Morley – orchestra and choir mixing assistance (tracks 1, 3)
- Tim Young – mastering

=== Artwork ===
- Farrow – design, art direction
- PSB – design, art direction
- John Ross – photography

== Charts ==
Chart (2009–2010)	Peak position
France (SNEP)	60
Germany (GfK)	35
Scotland Singles (OCC)	43
Sweden (Sverigetopplistan)	10
UK Singles (OCC)	40
US Top Dance Albums (Billboard)	20
