= Yes (Pet Shop Boys album) =

Studio album by Pet Shop Boys
- Released: 18 March 2009
- Recorded: May–November 2008
- Studios: Xenomania (Westerham, Kent); Abbey Road (London)
- Genre: Synth-pop
- Length: 48:39
- Label: Parlophone
- Producers: Brian Higgins; Xenomania

Pet Shop Boys chronology
Story: 25 Years of Hits (2009)	Yes (2009)	Party (2009)

Singles from Yes
- 1. "Love Etc." Released: 16 March 2009; 2. "Did You See Me Coming?" Released: 1 June 2009; 3. "Beautiful People" Released: 2 October 2009

Professional ratings
Aggregate scores
Source	Rating
AnyDecentMusic?	6.5/10
Metacritic	71/100
Review scores
Source	Rating
AllMusic	3.5/5 stars
Robert Christgau	(3-star Honorable Mention)
Entertainment Weekly	B+
The Guardian	3/5 stars
The Independent	3/5 stars
MusicOMH	4.5/5 stars
NME	8/10
PopMatters	7/10
Rolling Stone	3/5 stars
Spin	4/5 stars

Yes is the tenth studio album by English synth-pop duo Pet Shop Boys, released on 18 March 2009 by Parlophone. The album was recorded in 2008 and was produced by Brian Higgins and his production team Xenomania. Xenomania also co-wrote three of the tracks. Guitarist Johnny Marr and string arranger Owen Pallett appear as well. "Love Etc." was released on 16 March 2009 as the album's lead single.

== Background and recording ==
For their follow-up to Fundamental (2006), Pet Shop Boys approached the songwriting and production team Xenomania, who were among the top pop producers at the time. Neil Tennant was impressed with their electropop hits, in particular "Call the Shots" by Girls Aloud, and Chris Lowe said he "liked the idea of making a shiny pop record with the producers du jour".

They met with head producer Brian Higgins in April 2008. Higgins intended to turn them down because of a difficult experience with another group who were used to writing their own material, Franz Ferdinand. He changed his mind after meeting the duo and hearing the songs they had already written, including "Did You See Me Coming?"

Recording began in May and the album was completed on 27 November 2008. Most of the work took place at Xenomania's studio in Westerham, Kent, in a large house with people working on multiple projects in different rooms. Orchestra and brass arrangements for "All Over the World", "Beautiful People", and "Legacy" were recorded by the London Metropolitan Orchestra at Abbey Road Studios.

Pet Shop Boys wrote four songs with the Xenomania team. Three were used on Yes: "Love Etc.", "More Than a Dream", and "The Way It Used to Be". The fourth song, "The Loving Kind", was given to Girls Aloud because Lowe felt it didn't add anything to their own album.

Of the songs the duo wrote themselves, two were holdovers from earlier projects: "Pandemonium" was originally intended for Kylie Minogue, and "Beautiful People" had been conceived as a potential theme song for the 2008 television series. The last song written for the album was "All Over the World". It was inspired by "Que Calor" by Supermerk2, which the duo had heard in South America during the Fundamental Tour. To take the song in a new direction, Lowe incorporated the fanfare from Tchaikovsky's Nutcracker Suite.

The album was sequenced in two parts, with upbeat pop songs at the beginning, opening with the lead single "Love Etc.", and more experimental ones at the end, closing with the poetic and stylistically unusual "Legacy". The one-word title sums up the positive theme of the album according to Lowe, who noted: "It's almost an answer to the question, 'Is that the Pet Shop Boys?' 'Yes!'" Tennant also mentioned Yoko Ono's Ceiling Painting/Yes Painting as an inspiration.

== Release ==
Yes was released on 18 March 2009 in Japan. In the United Kingdom, it was released on 23 March and debuted at number four on the UK Albums Chart with first-week sales of 27,639 copies, the duo's highest-placing album since Bilingual (1996). Early sales figures predicted that the album would enter at number one, but its release was beset by distribution problems and Yes proved unable to hold onto its midweek position. The download version erroneously went on sale through the iTunes Store three days before its official release date, rendering 2,500 sales ineligible for the chart, while, the following week, a number of suppliers of the physical album reported stock level problems.

The closing track "Legacy" was subject to censorship in China for political sensitivity reasons, as it contains the lyric "governments fall". The song was changed to an instrumental.

The album was released in multiple formats, including a digital version that included a 48-minute track-by-track commentary on the album, and an 11-disc vinyl version limited to 300 copies, with each disc containing a different album track on the first side and a corresponding instrumental version on the second. The double CD edition of the album incorporated a bonus disc titled Etc., which featured mostly instrumental dub mixes of six album tracks, as well as a new song called "This Used to Be the Future", which features guest vocals by Philip Oakey of the Human League. A standard, single-disc vinyl LP was also issued, but did not coincide with the international CD and download release.

Yes produced two further singles to follow "Love Etc." On 1 June 2009, "Did You See Me Coming?" was released worldwide on a number of physical and digital formats, backed with three new B-sides. A limited release of "Beautiful People" followed in October. In addition, the five-track Christmas EP was released on 14 December 2009, with "All Over the World" acting as the principal radio promo and gaining a music video.

The album was nominated for Best Electronic/Dance Album at the 2010 Grammy Awards.

Yes was supported by a comprehensive world tour that stretched across 2009–2012. A recording of the tour made in London in December 2009 was released in a CD/DVD package on 15 February 2010 as Pandemonium.

Yes was re-released on 20 October 2017 (along with Elysium) as Yes: Further Listening 2008–2010. This reissue was digitally remastered and contained two bonus discs of B-sides, demos, remixes and rarities from the era.

== Artwork ==
The album sleeve was designed by Mark Farrow and Pet Shop Boys. The tick on the cover consists of 11 coloured squares, each one representing a track. It was inspired by German artist Gerhard Richter (who is referenced in the album's opening track, "Love Etc."), specifically his 4900 exhibition at the Serpentine Gallery and the stained glass window in Cologne Cathedral.

The album's cover was nominated in the 2010 Brit Insurance Design Awards shortlist in the Graphics category.

== Track listing ==
All tracks are written by Neil Tennant and Chris Lowe, except where noted.

Yes track listing
No.	Title	Writer(s)	Length
1.	"Love Etc."	Tennant; Lowe; Brian Higgins; Miranda Cooper; Tim Powell; Owen Parker	3:32
2.	"All Over the World"		3:51
3.	"Beautiful People"		3:42
4.	"Did You See Me Coming?"		3:41
5.	"Vulnerable"		4:47
6.	"More Than a Dream"	Tennant; Lowe; Cooper; Higgins; Jason Resch; Kieran Jones	4:57
7.	"Building a Wall"		3:50
8.	"King of Rome"		5:31
9.	"Pandemonium"		3:43
10.	"The Way It Used to Be"	Tennant; Lowe; Cooper; Higgins; Nick Coler	4:44
11.	"Legacy"		6:21

Japanese edition bonus track
No.	Title	Writer(s)	Length
12.	"Love Etc." (Pet Shop Boys Sex Mix)	Tennant; Lowe; Higgins; Cooper; Powell; Parker	6:18

iTunes Store bonus tracks
No.	Title	Writer(s)	Length
12.	"Love Etc." (Pet Shop Boys Dub)	Tennant; Lowe; Higgins; Cooper; Powell; Parker	6:18
13.	"Yes" (track by track commentary by Neil & Chris)		48:40

Special edition bonus disc: Etc.
No.	Title	Writer(s)	Length
1.	"This Used to Be the Future" (featuring Philip Oakey)		5:14
2.	"More Than a Dream" (Magical Dub)	Tennant; Lowe; Cooper; Higgins; Resch; Jones	6:10
3.	"Pandemonium" (The Stars and the Sun Dub)		5:50
4.	"The Way It Used to Be" (Left of Love Dub)	Tennant; Lowe; Cooper; Higgins; Coler	5:16
5.	"All Over the World" (This Is a Dub)		5:21
6.	"Vulnerable" (Public Eye Dub)		5:17
7.	"Love Etc." (Beautiful Dub)	Tennant; Lowe; Higgins; Cooper; Powell; Parker	6:24
Total length:			39:32

All tracks are written by Neil Tennant and Chris Lowe, except where noted.

Yes/Further Listening 2008–2010 Volume 1 (Disc 2)
No.	Title	Writer(s)	Length
1.	"Gin and Jag"		4:31
2.	"This Used to Be the Future" (with Phil Oakey)		5:12
3.	"We're All Criminals Now"		3:55
4.	"Gin and Jag" (Frisky Mix)		7:12
5.	"Beautiful People" (demo)		3:21
6.	"My Girl"	Mike Barson	3:41
7.	"The Loving Kind" (Monitor Mix)	Cooper; Higgins; Powell; Tennant; Lowe	3:22
8.	"Love Etc." (PSB Mix)	Tennant; Lowe; Higgins; Cooper; Powell; Parker	6:17
9.	"Did You See Me Coming?" (PSB Possibly More Mix)		8:48
10.	"The Former Enfant Terrible" (PSB Bring It On Mix)		7:23
11.	"Up and Down"		3:44
12.	"Brits Medley" (previously unreleased on CD)		9:35
Total length:			67:05

All tracks are written by Neil Tennant and Chris Lowe, except where noted.

Yes/Further Listening 2008–2010 Volume 2 (Disc 3)
No.	Title	Writer(s)	Length
1.	"I Cried for Us"	Kate McGarrigle	3:49
2.	"It Doesn't Often Snow at Christmas" (new version)		3:49
3.	"All Over the World" (new version)		3:47
4.	"Viva la Vida / Domino Dancing" (Christmas EP Mix)	Guy Berryman; Jonny Buckland; Will Champion; Chris Martin; Tennant; Lowe	5:32
5.	"My Girl" (Our House Mix)	Barson	5:48
6.	"Leaving" (demo)		4:14
7.	"Together"	Tennant; Lowe; Powell	3:28
8.	"Glad All Over"	Dave Clark; Mike Smith	3:25
9.	"The Dumpling Song" (demo from My Dad's a Birdman)	David Almond; Lowe; Tennant	1:47
10.	"Wings and Faith" (demo from My Dad's a Birdman)		2:08
11.	"Night Song" (Fan Club download 2010; demo from My Dad's a Birdman)	Almond; Lowe; Tennant	3:27
Total length:			41:19

== Personnel ==
Pet Shop Boys

- Neil Tennant – lead vocals (all tracks); keyboards, programming (tracks 3–5, 7–11)
- Chris Lowe – keyboards, programming (all tracks)

Additional musicians

- Tim Powell – keyboards, programming (all tracks); backing vocals (tracks 3, 6)
- Fred Falke – keyboards, programming (tracks 1, 5)
- Matt Gray – keyboards, programming (tracks 1–3, 6–8, 10, 11)
- Brian Higgins – keyboards, programming (tracks 1, 2, 4, 5); backing vocals (track 6)
- Owen Parker – keyboards, programming (tracks 1–3, 9, 10); guitar (tracks 1, 3, 4, 9); backing vocals (track 3)
- Sacha Collisson – keyboards, programming (tracks 1, 6); guitar (tracks 6, 10)
- Xenomania – backing vocals (tracks 1, 9)
- Andy Brown – brass arrangement, brass conducting (track 2); London Metropolitan Orchestra conducting (tracks 3, 11)
- London Metropolitan Orchestra – brass (track 2)
- Pete Gleadall – keyboards, programming (tracks 3–5, 7–9, 11)
- Kieran Jones – keyboards, programming (tracks 3, 6–8, 10, 11); guitar (tracks 3, 6)
- Nick Coler – keyboards, programming (tracks 3–5, 7, 9–11); guitar (tracks 3, 4, 10)
- Jason Resch – keyboards, programming (tracks 3, 6–8, 10, 11); guitar (tracks 3, 6–10)
- Johnny Marr – guitar (tracks 3, 4, 7, 9); harmonica (tracks 3, 9)
- Carla Marie Williams – backing vocals (track 3); guest vocals (track 10)
- Jessie Malakouti – backing vocals (track 3)
- Alex Gardner – backing vocals (tracks 3, 6)
- Owen Pallett – orchestral arrangement (tracks 3, 11)
- Cathy Thompson – London Metropolitan Orchestra leader (tracks 3, 11)
- Miranda Cooper – backing vocals (track 6)
- Mike Kearsey – brass (tracks 8, 9)
- Steve Hamilton – brass (tracks 8, 9)
- Mark Parnell – drums (track 9)
- Toby Scott – keyboards, programming (track 10)

Technical

- Brian Higgins – production
- Xenomania – production
- Jeremy Wheatley – mixing
- Andy Dudman – London Metropolitan Orchestra recording (tracks 2, 3, 11)
- Dick Beetham – mastering
- Tim Young – 2017 remastering

Artwork

- Farrow – design, art direction
- Pet Shop Boys – design, art direction
- Alasdair McLellan – photography

=== Etc. bonus disc ===
Pet Shop Boys

- Neil Tennant – lead vocals (all tracks); keyboards, programming (track 1)
- Chris Lowe – keyboards, programming (track 1)

Additional musicians

- Philip Oakey – guest vocals (track 1)
- Pete Gleadall – keyboards, programming (track 1)
- Tim Powell – keyboards, programming (track 1)

Technical

- Brian Higgins – production (track 1)
- Xenomania – production (track 1)
- Jeremy Wheatley – mixing (track 1)
- Pet Shop Boys – remix (tracks 2–5)
- Xenomania – remix (tracks 2–7)

== Charts ==
=== Weekly charts ===
Weekly chart performance for Yes
Chart (2009)	Peak position
Australian Albums (ARIA)	32
Austrian Albums (Ö3 Austria)	5
Belgian Albums (Ultratop Flanders)	69
Belgian Albums (Ultratop Wallonia)	49
Croatian Albums (HDU)	16
Czech Albums (ČNS IFPI)	6
Danish Albums (Hitlisten)	9
Dutch Albums (Album Top 100)	34
European Albums (Billboard)	3
Finnish Albums (Suomen virallinen lista)	28
French Albums (SNEP)	64
German Albums (Offizielle Top 100)	3
Greek International Albums (IFPI)	3
Hungarian Albums (MAHASZ)	24
Irish Albums (IRMA)	34
Italian Albums (FIMI)	40
Japanese Albums (Oricon)	32
Mexican Albums (Top 100 Mexico)	40
Norwegian Albums (VG-lista)	16
Scottish Albums (Official Charts)	8
Spanish Albums (Promusicae)	10
Swedish Albums (Sverigetopplistan)	12
Swiss Albums (Schweizer Hitparade)	7
UK Albums (Official Charts)	4
US Billboard 200	32
US Top Dance Albums (Billboard)	3

=== Year-end charts ===
Year-end chart performance for Yes
Chart (2009)	Position
German Albums (Offizielle Top 100)	65
US Top Dance/Electronic Albums (Billboard)	21

== Certifications and sales ==
Certifications and sales for Yes
Region	Certification	Certified units/sales
Germany (BVMI)	Gold	100,000^{^}
United Kingdom (BPI)	Silver	60,000^{^}
United States	—	49,000
^{^} Shipments figures based on certification alone.

== Release history ==
Release dates and formats for Yes
Region	Date	Format	Label	Ref.
Japan	18 March 2009	CD; 2-CD; digital download	EMI	
Australia	20 March 2009	CD; digital download	EMI	
Germany	20 March 2009	CD; 2-CD; digital download	EMI	
Italy	20 March 2009	CD; 2-CD; digital download	EMI	
France	23 March 2009	CD; digital download	EMI	
United Kingdom	23 March 2009	CD; 2-CD; digital download	Parlophone	
United States	21 April 2009	CD; 2-CD; digital download	Astralwerks	
Germany	24 April 2009	LP	EMI	
United Kingdom	11 May 2009	LP	Parlophone	
