= Jenny Oldfield =

English author

Jenny Oldfield (born 8 August 1949) is an English author who wrote Definitely Daisy, Animal Alert, Home Farm Twins, the Half Moon Ranch series and other pony books.

== Biography ==
Oldfield was born and brought up in Harrogate, Yorkshire. She says that even as a child she wrote stories and made tiny books, complete with illustrations.

Oldfield went on to study English at Birmingham University, where she did research on the Bronte Novels and on Children's Literature. She then worked as a teacher, before deciding to concentrate on writing. She writes novels for both children and adults and, when she can escape from her desk, likes to spend time outdoors. She loves the countryside and enjoys walking, gardening, playing tennis, riding and travelling with her two daughters, Kate and Eve.

The Horses of Half Moon Ranch series follows Matt Scott and his little sister Kirstie Scott. Matt and Kirstie's mom Sandy Glassner Scott owns a horse ranch and Kirstie spends as much time as she can with the horses that she loves dearly. However, they experience many trials and tribulations in the series and have to overcome these problems. Furthermore, Kirstie cannot bear to see horses be abused and mistreated and in some of the books goes to extreme lengths to prevent this occurrence. There are about 24 books in the series. Kirstie also loves to cowboy-up with her best friend Lisa.

She writes under her own name and several pseudonyms, including Jasmine Oliver, Donna King, Kate Fielding, Tina Nolan and Kate Pennington. She was also involved in the Animal Ark series, writing, along with several other authors, under the name Lucy Daniels.
