= Han Hoogerbrugge =

Dutch digital artist

Han Hoogerbrugge (born 11 October 1963) is a Dutch digital artist.

Hoogerbrugge was born in Rotterdam, where he is still based, and started out as a painter and cartoonist until he found the internet in 1996. He is the creator of the series Modern Living Neurotica as well as his current interactive series Hotel, created for the online SubmarineChannel.

Hoogerbrugge has also created prints and drawings that have appeared in galleries such as the Centraal Museum Utrecht in the Netherlands as part of their collection as well as Museo Tamayo in Mexico City and in the Design Museum in London. A book of his work was published in September 2008.

== Notable works ==
=== Neurotica 1998–2001 ===
Originally Hoogerbrugge's Modern Living / Neurotica series was a comic strip which he described as an "ongoing self-portrait" that chronicled his life as an artist during the mid-1990s. It was during this time that he decided to adapt his Neurotica idea for the internet and began publishing Modern Living Neurotica on his own website first as Animated Gif's and later using Macromedia's Flash which introduced his first attempt at creating interactive art media. The series later concluded in 2001 when the 100th episode was published.

=== Online flash animations ===
Hoogerbrugge also created a short interactive animation titled "Flow" on albinoblacksheep.com. The music of FLOW was made by Wiggle.

=== Hotel 2004–06 ===
Hotel was created for SubmarineChannel and debuted in 2004 on its own website. The series has an interactive Flash-based story which follows Dr. Doglin as he tries out strange experiments with volunteer subjects. This is contrasted with a comic strip which is released with each episode which seems to be a prequel which will lead up to the first Flash-based episode. The final episode of the series was released in May 2006. There is also a fake website here which is supposed to be Dr. Doglin's own website which has an ad for volunteers.

=== NAILS 2002–07 ===
Nails was begun in 2002 and ended in 2007. It consisted of a series of interactive flash shorts, that are reminiscent of the original Neurotica series, with him featuring prominently as the main character. 27 of these interactive shorts were made.

=== Pro Stress ===
Hoogerbrugge's latest series is a collaboration with writer Paul A. Hall called Pro Stress. The series began on 28 August 2006 and ended on 13 October 2006 after seven 'episodes'. A Pro Stress pill box was also released in a limited edition of 8 and is available from Han's website.

Hoogerbrugge has recently begun work on Pro Stress 2.0, which has adopted more of a traditional comic style. It is renewed daily, as a comic-esque strip is added, one per day. Occasionally paintings, quotes and portraits are included in amongst these, more often than not on the weekends. This project is noticeably more focused towards Hoogerbrugge's dry, surrealist humour than his previous work.

Prostress 2.0 began in the 38th week of 2008 and is still being updated.

=== Music videos ===
Hoogerbrugge has made a number of promotional videos for music acts, including "Landslide" by Dead Man Ray and,"You've got to...", "Your music is killing me", "Wake up, make up, bring it up, shake up", "MASHitUP","Ready for the Fight", "Sugar Candy", "All these things are gone" (a 3 minutes and a 14 minutes video) by The Young Punx. In 2009, he directed the Pet Shop Boys music video, "Love etc."

== Books ==
- Modern Living: The Graphic Universe of Han Hoogerbrugge (with DVD) – 2008, ISBN 978-90-6369-187-5
- "ProStress#1"- 2010 ISBN 978-90-6369-234-6
- "ProStress#2"- 2011 ISBN 978-90-6369-273-5
- "Run Motherfucker Dance" in Anaglyph 3D So_AND-SO The Magazine as an Art Form#2
- "Clumsiness, Frustrations and Awkwardness I" 2014 /CFA.html A catalogue of works & activities since 2008 to 2012
- "Clumsiness, Frustrations and Awkwardness II- La Période Vache" / 2016 A catalogue of works & activities from 2012 to 2015
