= Unicorn Kid =

Scottish electronic music composer and musician

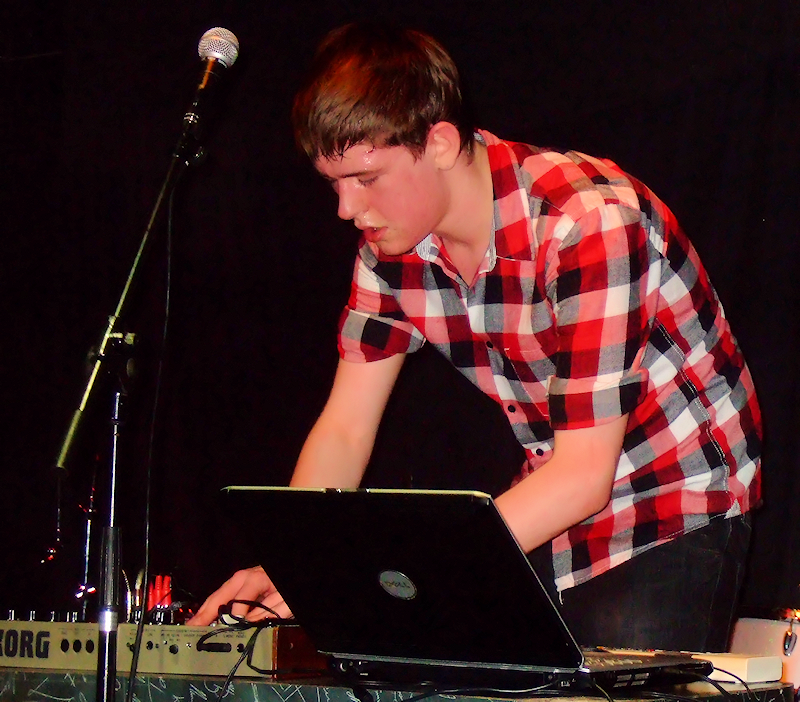
- Unicorn Kid at The Doghouse in Dundee, Scotland, 16 November 2008

Background information
- Born: Oliver Sabin; 5 November 1991 (age 34); Leith, Edinburgh, Scotland
- Genres: Chiptune, seapunk, bouncy techno, rave, tropical house
- Instruments: Keyboards, synthesizer
- Years active: 2007–2014
- Labels: Ultra, Ministry of Sound

Oliver Sabin (born 5 November 1991), formerly known as Unicorn Kid, is a Scottish electronic music/chip music composer and musician from Edinburgh, educated at Leith Academy. Sabin has had a number of BBC Radio 1 appearances including an early live session on the Vic Galloway BBC Radio 1 show and a BBC Maida Vale Studios session for Rob da Bank. In September 2014, he announced the end of Unicorn Kid to pursue a different alias. In 2017, Sabin released a DJ set on SoundCloud under the alias Plush.

== History ==
Sabin first started writing electronic music when he was 15. By the time he was 16, Sabin started recording under the name "Unicorn Kid". When asked about the name of the act, Sabin stated, "There's no real story behind the name, it just kind of came about and fitted in with the fun, magical nature of the music."Emerging in 2007, Unicorn Kid helped spark the brief revival of chiptune, a genre which involves making dance music using the sound chips from old game consoles. This was alongside such performers as Anamanaguchi, RushJet1 and Dubmood.

=== Early years (2009–2010) ===
After two self-released EPs, 'Lion Hat' was released in early 2009 on Euphonios, a Scottish-based independent label, followed up by 'Wee Monsters'/'Animal City' (Euphonios 2009).

In mid-2009, Sabin remixed the Pet Shop Boys single "Did You See Me Coming?". The Unicorn Kid mix was released on the 12" vinyl version and as part of the digital bundle. In April 2010, Sabin provided the first remix of the Gorillaz track "Superfast Jellyfish".

=== Dreamcatcher and Wild Life (2010–2011) ===
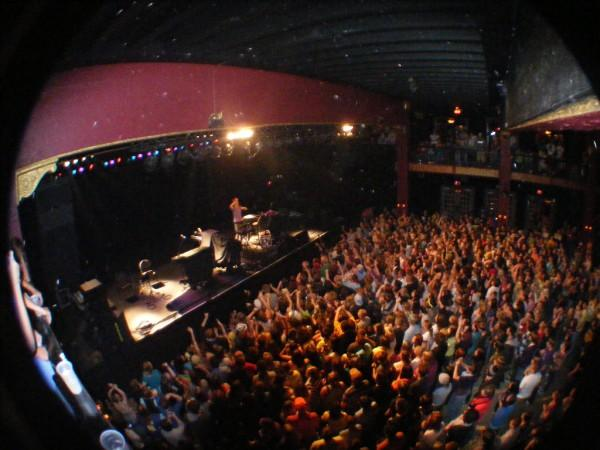
Unicorn Kid in Milwaukee, WI

Signed by EMI Music Publishing in 2009, Sabin initially released his material through the Euphonios label, but signed to Ministry of Sound in February 2010 and Ultra Records in the USA. His first release on Ministry of Sound was the track "Dreamcatcher", followed by Wild Life in October 2010.

In 2009, following an appearance at T in the Park and support slots for Calvin Harris, played two official shows at In the City and Sŵn Festival. Unicorn Kid has also supported Pet Shop Boys in Scotland, and in early 2010 supported Hadouken! on their UK tour before performing several shows at SXSW as one of the official Scottish Arts Council representatives. He returned to SXSW in 2011, and featured in a BBC Scotland documentary.

=== Tidal Rave and Brain Wash (2011–2014) ===
In August 2011, Unicorn Kid released the three track 'Tidal Rave' EP, with the final track "True Love Fantasy" featuring as 'Hottest Record in the World' on the 25 August 2011 Zane Lowe show on BBC Radio 1. It was then featured on the BBC's 'In New Music We Trust' playlist and as 'Record of the Week' by both Nick Grimshaw and Huw Stephens. The track includes vocals from Talk to Animals, with whom Sabin had collaborated on his first release.

Unicorn Kid was the support act for synth-pop musician Owl City on his rescheduled UK and European tour in September/October 2011. In December 2011, Unicorn Kid featured as part of BBC Radio 1's Festive Festival showcasing 2011's rising stars hotly tipped for big things in the New Year.

In April 2012, Sabin released a new track "Pure Space" for free download just prior to a UK tour with Major Lazer. The track premiered online on The Fader.

Despite no advertisement or announcement from either Sabin or 3Beat, he released his debut album Brain Wash on iTunes via 3Beat Records on 27 January 2014. It contained 11 tracks, many of which were previously released.

=== The End of Unicorn Kid (2014) ===
On 7 September, after being released from his contract with 3Beat, Sabin announced via Twitter that he had called it quits as Unicorn Kid because he was not enjoying the direction his music was going under the alias. He announced that he will be back later in 2014 with a brand new project.

=== Plush (since 2017) ===
On 7 September 2017 Sabin released a DJ set called birth of plush as Plush, featuring an original composition. On 24 October 2022 Doss released the single "Look (All Night Mix)" with production credits featuring Plush.

== Personal life ==
In an interview with Teen Witch Magazine, Unicorn Kid explained that he has been openly gay since the age of 13.

== Discography ==
=== Albums ===
- Brain Wash (27 January 2014)

=== Singles ===
- "Lion Hat" (2009)
- "Wee Monsters" (2009)
- "Dreamcatcher" (2010)
- "Wild Life" (2010)
- "Pure Space" (2012)
- "Need U" (2012)
- "I Remember" (Feat. Nicholas Petricca) (2013)

=== EPs ===
- We Had Eaten All the Animals, and Bartered All the Jewels (with Talk to Animals) (2007)
- Sugarfest! (2008)
- Lion Hat (2009)
- Wee Monsters (2009)
- Dreamcatcher (2010)
- Tidal Rave (2011)
- Feel So Real (2013)
- Need U (Remixes) (2013)

=== Remixes ===
- Pet Shop Boys – Did You See Me Coming? (Unicorn Kid Mix) (2009)
- You Love Her Coz She's Dead – Me Versus You (Unicorn Kid Remix) (2009)
- Gorillaz – Superfast Jellyfish (Unicorn Kid Remix) (2010)
- DJ Khaled – I'm On One (Feat. Drake) (Unicorn Kid STADIUM Mix) (2011)
- Death Cab for Cutie – Unobstructed Views (Unicorn Kid Remix) (2011)
- Blood Diamonds – Phone Sex (Feat. Grimes) (Unicorn Kid Remix) (2012)
- Van She – Jamaica (Unicorn Kid Remix) (2012)
- The Very Best (band) - Kondaine (Feat. Seye) (Unicorn Kid Remix) (2012)
- A*M*E – Heartless (Unicorn Kid Dub Mix) (2013)
- Chlöe Howl – Rumour (Unicorn Kid Remix) (2013)
- Sky Ferreira – Everything is Embarrassing (Unicorn Kid Remix) (2013)
