= Together (Pet Shop Boys song) =

Single by Pet Shop Boys

from the album Ultimate
- B-side: "Glad All Over"; "I Cried for Us"
- Released: 24 October 2010
- Recorded: September 2010
- Genre: House; synth-pop
- Length: 3:30
- Label: Parlophone
- Songwriters: Neil Tennant; Chris Lowe; Tim Powell
- Producers: Tim Powell; Pet Shop Boys

Pet Shop Boys singles chronology
"Love Life" (2010)	"Together" (2010)	"Winner" (2012)

Music video
- "Together" on YouTube

"Together" is a song by English synth-pop duo Pet Shop Boys from their greatest hits album, Ultimate (2010). It was released by Parlophone as a digital download on 24 October 2010 and as a physical release on 29 November 2010. It was the third Pet Shop Boys single to miss the top 40 of the UK Singles Chart, reaching number 58 on 11 December 2010.

== Background and composition ==
"Together" was a new single written for the compilation album Ultimate. In September 2010, Pet Shop Boys went to Brighton to work with Tim Powell, formerly of Xenomania, with whom they had collaborated on the songs "Love Etc." and "The Loving Kind" during the writing sessions for Yes (2009). In addition to "Together", they recorded a cover version of "Glad All Over" with Powell, which was used as a B-side for the single.

The duo were inspired by a song they heard in Portugal, "As sete mulheres do Minho" by Jose Afonso. Neil Tennant said the revolutionary and heroic feel of the Portuguese song influenced the idea of "Together we'll go all the way". He called "Together" a positive song "about two people being intensely in love… But it could really be anything about two people. It could be Chris and I at the beginning of our writing career together, thinking we could go all the way with this".

Chris Lowe described the music as waltz. The song features an almost completely electronic arrangement in 3/4 time, one of the very few songs in the band's catalogue to feature an odd-numbered time signature. According to a statement by Tennant at the time, he and Lowe wrote it that way because they were fascinated by the Viennese waltzes written by Johann Strauss II; Tennant noted that the beat of the song is something Strauss may have come up with if he were alive today.

== Release ==
The song received its first play on UK radio on 22 October 2010 during Ken Bruce's show on BBC Radio 2 prior to the digital release of the track. A single package on CD and digital formats followed on 29 November.

The single entered the chart at number 58 and spent one week in the top 100. Previously, the only Pet Shop Boys singles to miss the top 40 on the UK Singles Chart were the original version of "Opportunities (Let's Make Lots of Money)" in 1985 and the digital-only release of "Integral" in 2007. In the liner notes of the 2017 reissue Yes: Further Listening 2008–2010, it was noted: "by the time they released 'Together' ... because of how both British radio and the way that the charts were compiled had changed as technology and patterns of music consumption evolved, it was no longer likely that a Pet Shop Boys single would reach the Top 40".

In the United States, "Together" was released on 12 April 2011 by Astralwerks on five digital formats. It reached number three on Billboard magazine's Dance Singles Sales chart.

Bonus tracks include remixes of "Together" and "West End Girls" and new recordings of two cover versions: "I Cried for Us", arranged for a memorial concert for the songwriter, Kate McGarrigle; and the Dave Clark Five song "Glad All Over", which Pet Shop Boys had performed at the Empress Ballroom after Blackpool was promoted to the Premier League of football in 2010.

"Together" is included on Yes: Further Listening 2008–2010 along with the B-sides "I Cried for Us" and "Glad All Over".

=== Artwork ===
The single artwork features empty handcuffs, conveying the idea of people being handcuffed together. Lowe came up with the concept, which he described as "kinky", and Mark Farrow designed the sleeves.

== Music video ==
The video for "Together" was filmed in Estonia, in Tallinn and Maardu, by Peeter Rebane, with choreography by Märt Agu. It tells a story of a group of middle-class girls at a ballet school who encounter some working-class boys doing a mix of breakdancing and Cossack dancing, and together they combine their dance styles to the beat of the song. The dancers were selected from the Tallinn Dance Academy, and the locations were chosen to create an authentic atmosphere to depict a story of young people from a small industrial town in Eastern Europe. Tennant and Lowe appear briefly as behind-the-scenes spectators of a dance show by the group, and at the start and end of the video.

Pet Shop Boys came up with the concept after seeing Cossack-style dancing to techno music at a nightclub in Riga, Latvia. Tennant also noted a similarity to the video for the Run-D.M.C. song "It's Like That", where male and female breakdance crews face off against each other.

== Live performances ==
In December 2010, Pet Shop Boys played "Together" as part of their setlist at a special Big Noise Session of the Little Noise Sessions benefiting Mencap, a charity for people with learning disabilities. They also performed the song on select dates of the Progress Live tour as the opening act for Take That.

== Track listings ==
CD1 maxi single/Digital 4-track
No.	Title	Writer(s)	Length
1.	"Together" (Ultimate Mix)	Neil Tennant; Chris Lowe; Tim Powell	3:32
2.	"Glad All Over"	Dave Clark; Mike Smith	3:27
3.	"I Cried for Us"	Kate McGarrigle	3:48
4.	"Together" (Extended Mix)	Tennant; Lowe; Powell	6:56
Total length:			17:43

CD2 single/Digital 2-track
No.	Title	Writer(s)	Length
1.	"Together" (Radio Mix)	Tennant; Lowe; Powell	3:30
2.	"West End Girls" (Grum Remix)	Tennant; Lowe	5:33
Total length:			9:03

Digital 3-track
No.	Title	Writer(s)	Length
1.	"Together" (Pepptalk Mix)	Tennant; Lowe; Powell	6:46
2.	"Together" (Ultrabeat Remix)	Tennant; Lowe; Powell	3:41
3.	"West End Girls" (Grum Dub Mix)	Tennant; Lowe	5:34
Total length:			16:01

Digital 1-track
No.	Title	Writer(s)	Length
1.	"Together" (Ultimate Mix)	Tennant; Lowe; Powell	3:30
Total length:			3:30

Digital video
No.	Title	Writer(s)	Length
1.	"Together" (video)	Tennant; Lowe; Powell	3:30
Total length:			3:30

== Personnel ==
Credits adapted from the liner notes of Yes: Further Listening 2008–2010 and "Together".

Pet Shop Boys

- Chris Lowe
- Neil Tennant

Technical personnel

- Tim Powell – production
- Jeremy Wheatley – mixing
- Tim Young – mastering

== Charts ==
Chart performance for "Together"
Chart (2010–2011)	Peak position
Germany (GfK)	60
Scotland Singles (OCC)	69
Slovakia Airplay (ČNS IFPI)	71
UK Singles (OCC)	58
US Dance Singles Sales (Billboard)	3
US Hot Singles Sales (Billboard)	20
