= Supermerk2 =

Argentine cumbia villera band

- Origin: Buenos Aires, Argentina
- Genres: Cumbia villera
- Years active: 2003–present
- Members: Chanchin

Supermerk2 is an Argentine cumbia villera group founded in 2003 by Óscar "Chanchín" Sotelo and Sergio "Fideo" Galvan. Their single "Que Calor", taken from the album "La Lata", became their first hit single, being certified gold.

Discography

La Lata publicado en el 2003

1. La Lata
2. La Resaka
3. El Avion
4. Mulo Raro
5. La Gorda
6. Levanten Las Manos
7. Que Calor
8. Todos Los Pibes
9. Tomando Porqueria
10. Triste y Llorando
