= My Bad Sister =

Musical act with British twin sisters

My Bad Sister is a musical act consisting of the British twin sisters Polly and Sophie Duniam (born 15 March 1987). They gained fame in the BBC series Home Farm Twins portraying Hannah and Helen Moore, the eponymous twins of the late 1990s series.

They were born in London, England, and grew up in Cromer, Norfolk, with a love of dancing and singing that stems from their dance instructor mother. This helped them gain a year-long contract with We Will Rock You in their mid-teens. They toured with the Pet Shop Boys on an 18-month contract during the Pandemonium Tour.

They have performed at a number of festivals and venues across Europe under the name of My Bad Sister, combining elements of pop, rap and underground dance music with a distinctive mirrored choreography. They have modelled for contemporary fashion designers like Jylle Navarro and Celia Arias and appeared in Rita Ora's 2014 music video for her number one single "I Will Never Let You Down".

Polly appeared on E4's Tattoo Fixers in 2015 to cover up a bad tattoo.

== Discography ==
- My Bad Sister, Vol 1 (2015)
- Resist Against Violent Enterprise (w/ Danger Marc) (2018)
