= King's Cross (song) =

1987 song by Pet Shop Boys

Song by Pet Shop Boys

from the album Actually
- Released: 1987
- Recorded: 1987
- Studio: Advision Studios (London)
- Genre: Synth-pop
- Length: 5:10
- Label: Parlophone Records; EMI Records
- Songwriters: Neil Tennant; Chris Lowe
- Producer: Stephen Hague

"King's Cross" is a song by English synth-pop duo Pet Shop Boys, written by Chris Lowe and Neil Tennant for their second studio album, Actually (1987). The title refers to the London railway station and the surrounding area that share the name King's Cross. Neil Tennant has said that "King's Cross" is about the victims of Thatcherism and the way society was changing and leaving people out of the "new, bright Thatcherite Britain". He considers it to be one of the best Pet Shop Boys songs.

In 2007, it was recorded and released as a single by Tracey Thorn.

== Background and composition ==
King's Cross is the destination for trains coming to London from North East England and Scotland. Tennant described it as "the station you come to when you come down to London looking for opportunity from the North-East, then the most depressed part of England". At the time the song was written in 1986, during Margaret Thatcher's second term as Prime Minister, over three million people in the UK were unemployed, with northern England and Scotland among the hardest-hit regions. King's Cross was a run-down area with a notorious reputation, frequented by drug addicts and sex workers; it was also home to artists, musicians, activists, and members of the gay community, as well as nightlife venues like the Bell and Scala.

Chris Lowe lived in King's Cross at the time. Tennant came up with the idea for the song while passing the station on the way to Lowe's flat. Another friend in the car said, "Someone told me Monday, someone told me Saturday", about an unspecified matter. Tennant used the phrase in the lyrics, coupled with the line "wait until tomorrow and there's still no way", to mean being pushed around, waiting for an opportunity that doesn't come; he called it "a metaphor for Britain". The opening line, "The man at the back of the queue was sent to feel the smack of firm government", interprets a saying associated with Thatcher's government in a literal way, to mean the weakest person gets hit.

Tennant wrote the first version of the song on guitar at a slower tempo than the final version. Producer Stephen Hague suggested adding a key change, and he recorded the sounds of trains approaching the station, which were used to close out the album.

== King's Cross fire ==
Two months after the release of Actually, 31 people were killed in the King's Cross fire. The line "dead and wounded on either side, you know it's only a matter of time" could be seen as prophetic of the disaster. In reality, Tennant stated that the line is a reference to AIDS, which was claiming many lives at that time. The Sun newspaper campaigned for "King's Cross" to be released as a charity single, but the song remained an album-only track.

The song featured in the 1988 film It Couldn't Happen Here in a scene where a man heads out to work engulfed in flames. Director Jack Bond was going to delete the scene but it remained after he consulted with families of some of the victims.

== Video ==
For the Pet Shop Boys' first tour in 1989, filmmaker Derek Jarman created video projections to be shown during the performance of different songs, including "King's Cross". Some of the footage came from the 1987 music video for "Rent", featuring Chris Lowe disembarking from a train at King's Cross. Jarman returned to the station in 1989, after the fire, to shoot more film, using Super 8 blown up to 70mm. In a talk on Derek Jarman at UCL Urban Lab, Ben Campkin described the projection for "King's Cross":

The haunting black and white footage of King's Cross produced in '87 and '89 by Jarman and his collaborators echoes the elegiac atmosphere of the Pet Shop Boys' song, and the sense of suspension and disorientation. We follow the unpredictable handheld camera as it judders and sways from the iconic mid-nineteenth-century gasworks, enclosed by a barbed-wire fence, through a street filled with market stalls and litter, into the crowded underground foyer, ending on a train leaving London. Different scenes are superimposed, distorting time and space through montage. The screen is bleached white, then dark and obscure. Traces leak from one scene to the next as one vignette folds into another. 1987 and 1989 collapse into one.

The tour films were made available in 1993 on the video compilation Projections.

== Live performances ==
In addition to the 1989 tour, "King's Cross" was performed on the 1994 Discovery Tour, released on CD and DVD as Discovery: Live in Rio 1994, and on the 2009–2010 Pandemonium Tour, also released on CD and DVD. The song was also performed during the Obscure concerts in 2026.

== Cover versions ==
=== Tracey Thorn version ===
"King's Cross"

Single by Tracey Thorn

from the album Out of the Woods
- Released: December 2007 (Worldwide)
- Genre: Pop/Dance
- Label: Virgin Records
- Songwriters: Neil Tennant, Chris Lowe

Tracey Thorn singles chronology
"Grand Canyon" (2007)	"King's Cross" (2007)

On 9 December 2007, Tracey Thorn released "King's Cross" as the final single from her Out of the Woods album. The single version was remixed by Hot Chip.

Her version of "King's Cross" had first appeared as an iTunes exclusive bonus track to Thorn's album Out of the Woods. This stripped back version had been recorded for inclusion on the main album, but at the time Thorn said in a blog post on Myspace there was not enough room to include it, so it remained a bonus for digital versions of the album only.

Neil Tennant from Pet Shop Boys was also thanked in the sleeve-notes to Out of the Woods as he gave her motivation to record and release a new solo album twenty-five years after her first solo album.

=== Track listing ===
Digital download

1. "King's Cross" (Hot Chip remix) – 6:49
