= Tim Powell (producer) =

British songwriter & producer (born 1979)

- Born: Timothy Martin Powell; 1979 (age 46–47)
- Origin: Sussex, UK
- Genres: Pop, dance

Tim Powell, born Timothy Martin Powell (born 21 June 1979), is a British songwriter, producer and mixer. Powell was a member of the writing and production house, Xenomania, for fourteen years. His first hit "All I Wanna Do" for Dannii Minogue peaked at number four on the UK Singles Chart in 1997. In his fourteen years at Xenomania, Powell contributed to hit records such as "Hole in the Head" and "Round Round" by Sugababes, "Call the Shots" by Girls Aloud and "Love etc." by Pet Shop Boys.

In March 2010, Powell split from Xenomania to become an independent songwriter and producer. Following his departure, Powell co-wrote "I'm in Love" by Alex Gaudino and co-wrote and produced Ed Drewett's debut single "Champagne Lemonade", released in October 2010.

Powell collaborated again with Pet Shop Boys co-writing and producing their single, "Together", which features on their album Ultimate.

2012 saw Powell work and share writing and/or production credits with Paloma Faith's "Picking Up the Pieces" (co-writer), Saint Etienne for their album Words & Music, Jess Mills' single "For My Sins" and the third track on Little Mix's debut album DNA, "Change Your Life", released in November 2012.

Powell collaborated with Pet Shop Boys for a third time in 2019 on the track "Give Stupidity a Chance" from their Agenda EP.

== Discography (released singles, date order) ==
- "All I Wanna Do" - Dannii Minogue
- "Round Round" - Sugababes
- "Action" - Saint Etienne
- "Sound of the Underground" - Girls Aloud
- "Jump" - Girls Aloud
- "Hole in the Head" - Sugababes
- "In the Middle" - Sugababes
- "No Good Advice" - Girls Aloud
- "Giving You Up" - Kylie Minogue
- "Love Machine" - Girls Aloud
- "The Show" - Girls Aloud
- "Wake Me Up" - Girls Aloud
- "Biology" - Girls Aloud
- "Knock Down" - Alesha Dixon
- "Red Dress" - Sugababes
- "Something Kinda Ooooh" - Girls Aloud
- "Call the Shots" - Girls Aloud
- "Can't Speak French" - Girls Aloud
- "Sweet About Me" - Gabriella Cilmi
- "Save the Lies" - Gabriella Cilmi
- "Sanctuary" - Gabriella Cilmi
- "The Promise" - Girls Aloud
- "The Boy Does Nothing" - Alesha Dixon
- "My Love Is Better" - Annie
- "Love Etc." - Pet Shop Boys
- "Left My Heart in Tokyo" - Mini Viva
- "I Wish" - Mini Viva
- "Loving Kind" - Girls Aloud
- "Did You See Me Coming" - Pet Shop Boys
- "Untouchable" - Girls Aloud
- "One Touch" - Mini Viva
- "I'm in Love (I Wanna Do It)" - Alex Gaudino
- "Champagne Lemonade" - Ed Drewett
- "Together" - Pet Shop Boys
- "Tonight" - Saint Etienne
- "I've Got Your Music" - Saint Etienne
- "Picking Up the Pieces" - Paloma Faith
- "For My Sins" - Jess Mills
- "Good Intentions" - Dappy
- "Change Your Life" - Little Mix
- "Take It Like a Man" - Cher
- "Man Enuff" - M.O
- "Piece of Me" - MK feat. Becky Hill
