= Did You See Me Coming? =

Single by Pet Shop Boys

from the album Yes
- B-side: "After the Event"; "The Former Enfant Terrible"; "Up and Down"
- Released: 1 June 2009
- Recorded: 2008
- Studio: Xenomania (Westerham, Kent)
- Genre: Dance-pop; synth-pop
- Length: 3:41
- Label: Parlophone
- Songwriters: Neil Tennant; Chris Lowe
- Producers: Brian Higgins; Xenomania

Pet Shop Boys singles chronology
| "Love Etc." (2009) | "Did You See Me Coming?" (2009) | "Beautiful People" (2009) |

Music video
- "Did You See Me Coming?" on YouTube

"Did You See Me Coming?" is a song by English synth-pop duo Pet Shop Boys, released on 1 June 2009 as the second single from their tenth studio album, Yes (2009). It reached number 21 on the UK Singles Chart. The single was Pet Shop Boys' tenth number-one hit on Billboard magazine's Hot Dance Club Songs chart, extending their lead as the record holder for most dance club chart-toppers for a duo or group earned by their previous single "Love Etc."

== Background and composition ==
"Did You See Me Coming?" combined a backing track composed by Chris Lowe with lyrics that Neil Tennant had originally written for a ballad. The title was inspired by a phrase used by Tennant's mother, "They must have seen you coming", to refer to someone being conned. He described it as a positive love song. The "Possibly More Mix" features significant extra lyrics inspired by common descriptions found in lonely hearts/singles adverts, such as "attractive", "blue-eyed", "smart".

Pet Shop Boys played the demo of "Did You See Me Coming?" at their initial meeting with Brian Higgins of Xenomania as a sort of audition before agreeing to work together. Higgins commented that the song was "80% there" at the time. The final version was similar to the demo, with input from the Xenomania team on the rhythm track. Former Smiths guitarist Johnny Marr made a guest appearance on the song.

== Release ==
Pet Shop Boys originally intended to release "All Over the World" as the second single from Yes. Their record label expressed a preference for "Did You See Me Coming?", and the song received positive feedback from BBC Radio 2, so it was chosen instead.

In the UK, the digital release date was 31 May 2009 followed by the CD on 1 June, while some European countries saw an early release on 29 May. The single came out on 9 June in the United States and on 19 June in Germany and Austria.

The single was made available in six formats: two-track CD, CD maxi, 12-inch vinyl, and three digital bundles, each with a different track listing. Included were new tracks "After the Event", "The Former Enfant Terrible", and "Up and Down", which do not appear on Yes. There were also new mixes of "Did You See Me Coming?" by Pet Shop Boys and Unicorn Kid, and "The Way It Used to Be" mixed by Richard X. The medley of hits performed by Pet Shop Boys at the 2009 Brit Awards was also released in one of the digital bundles.

=== Artwork ===
The artwork for the single package was designed by Mark Farrow, with photographs taken by Alasdair McLellan at a session in January 2009. The duo appear together and separately on different versions of the single. Lowe is on the two-track CD1 (pictured) with a yellow background, and Tennant is on the CD2 maxi-single with a pink cover. Their coats were designed by Gareth Pugh and were also worn for their Brit Awards performance in February. The coloured squares over their faces are a motif carried over from the album and the previous single, "Love Etc." The promotional CD had a blue background with only the two squares, like a pair of eyes.

=== Music video ===
The video was filmed in April 2009 and was directed by Douglas Hart, formerly of The Jesus and Mary Chain. It features Tennant in a black suit, similar to his look for "West End Girls", and Lowe wearing shades behind his synthesizer. The duo perform the song with a variable backdrop of black-and-white shapes. Tennant and Lowe remarked on its resemblance to the video for "Minimal", but without the dancers.

== Critical reception ==
Reviewers for The Singles Jukebox gave the single an average score of 5.58 out of 10. With the highest rating of 8, Edward Okulicz called the song "a gorgeous cocktail disco stomp to rival some of Very's giddiest pinnacles". Alfred Soto gave it a 7, observing: "The Boys have become such master songwriters that few "real" bands can cobble together a sun-kissed guitar groove as buoyant as this, by far the catchiest song on the lackluster Yes". He concluded, "Impossible to dislike, difficult to remember an hour later". On the low end with a score of 2, Alex Macpherson commented, "Sadly, I did indeed see this clumsy cliché of a song coming, as well as the accompanying tossed-off synth limpness masquerading as a "beat"". Jonathan Bradley rated it 3, explaining: "The streamlined exuberance is agreeable, but, on a song so thin in inspiration, that seems to be a crutch more than a triumph of aesthetics. The lyrics are banal rather than deeply affecting, and by the time the vacant middle eight hits ("I'm not superstitious/or really religious/Just to thyself be true") they have lost all ability to be involving".

David Balls of Digital Spy rated the single 3 out of 5 stars, calling it "A light, no-strings-attached love song … delivering an unambiguous and heartwarming message over toe-tapping disco beats … It might lack the infectious hook of 'Love etc.', but this is still a welcome offering in a renaissance year for the boys". In a track-by-track review of Yes for The Quietus, Iain Moffat wrote: "We're not totally in hi-NRG territory yet, but Chris has done a sterling job keeping his fingers off the space disco buttons thus far only to start falling brilliantly off that particular wagon on this inordinately sweet affair that casts Neil as perhaps a tad naive in the world of woo but a dogged and winningly puppyish pursuer regardless, not to mention a charmingly erudite one…" Jaime Gill of BBC Music called "Did You See Me Coming?" a "sugar rush" and "a joyous reminder that Neil Tennant is one of the few middle-aged men still able to tap into the inner teenager at the heart of great pop".

== Track listings ==
- 2-track CD single
1. "Did You See Me Coming?" – 3:41
2. "After the Event" – 5:19
- CD maxi single
1. "Did You See Me Coming?" (PSB Possibly More mix) – 8:52
2. "The Former Enfant Terrible" – 2:56
3. "Up and Down" – 3:43
- 12-inch single

A1. "Did You See Me Coming?" (PSB Possibly More mix) – 8:52
A2. "Did You See Me Coming?" (Unicorn Kid mix) – 4:13
B. "The Way It Used to Be" (Richard X mix) – 8:39

- German CD maxi single (released on 19 June 2009)
1. "Did You See Me Coming?"
2. "After the Event"
3. "The Former Enfant Terrible"
4. "Up and Down"
- Digital bundle 1
1. "Did You See Me Coming?"
2. Pet Shop Boys Brit Awards medley
- Digital bundle 2
1. "Did You See Me Coming?" (Unicorn Kid mix)
2. "The Way It Used to Be" (Richard X mix)
- Digital bundle 3
1. "Did You See Me Coming?" (PSB Possibly More mix)
2. "The Former Enfant Terrible" (Bring it on mix)
- US digital download
1. "Did You See Me Coming?" (PSB Possibly More Mix) – 8:48
2. "After the Event" – 5:16
3. "Up and Down" – 3:41
4. "The Former Enfant Terrible" (Bring It On Mix) – 7:22
5. "Did You See Me Coming?" (Unicorn Kid Mix) – 4:08
6. "The Way It Used to Be" (Richard X Mix) – 8:37
- US digital download 2
1. "Did You See Me Coming?" – 3:40
2. "The Former Enfant Terrible" – 2:51
3. "Pet Shop Boys "Brits" Medley" – 9:31
- UK digital download
1. "Did You See Me Coming?" – 3:40
2. "Pet Shop Boys "Brits" Medley" – 9:31
3. "Did You See Me Coming?" (Unicorn Kid Mix) – 4:08
4. "The Way It Used to Be" (Richard X Mix) – 8:37
5. "Did You See Me Coming?" (PSB Possibly More Mix) – 8:48
6. "The Former Enfant Terrible" (Bring It On Mix) – 7:22

== Personnel ==
Personnel are adapted from the liner notes of Yes: Further Listening 2008–2010 and "Did You See Me Coming?"

Pet Shop Boys

- Chris Lowe – keyboards and programming
- Neil Tennant – vocals, keyboards and programming

Additional musicians

- Johnny Marr – guitar
- Owen Parker – guitar
- Nick Coler – guitar, keyboards and programming
- Pete Gleadall – keyboards and programming
- Tim Powell – keyboards and programming
- Brian Higgins – keyboards and programming

Technical personnel

- Brian Higgins/Xenomania – production
- Jeremy Wheatley – mixing
- Dick Beetham – mastering

Artwork

- Farrow and PSB – design and art direction
- Alasdair McLellan – photography

== Charts ==
=== Weekly charts ===
Weekly chart performance for "Did You See Me Coming?"
| Chart (2009) | Peak position |
|---|---|
| Germany (GfK) | 49 |
| Scottish Singles Sales (Official Charts) | 2 |
| Slovakia Airplay (ČNS IFPI) | 42 |
| UK Singles (Official Charts) | 21 |
| US Dance Club Songs (Billboard) | 1 |
| US Top Dance Albums (Billboard) "Did You See Me Coming?" EP | 18 |

=== Year-end charts ===
Year-end chart performance for "Did You See Me Coming?"
| Chart (2009) | Position |
|---|---|
| US Dance Club Songs (Billboard) | 29 |
