= Love Etc. (song) =

2009 single by Pet Shop Boys

Single by Pet Shop Boys

from the album Yes
- B-side: "Gin and Jag"; "We're All Criminals Now"
- Released: 16 March 2009
- Recorded: 2008
- Studio: Xenomania (Westerham, Kent)
- Genre: Synth-pop; dance-pop
- Length: 3:32
- Label: Parlophone
- Songwriters: Neil Tennant; Chris Lowe; Brian Higgins; Miranda Cooper; Tim Powell; Owen Parker
- Producers: Brian Higgins; Xenomania

Pet Shop Boys singles chronology
"Integral" (2007)	"Love Etc." (2009)	"Did You See Me Coming?" (2009)

Music video
- "Love Etc." on YouTube

"Love Etc." is a song by English synth-pop duo Pet Shop Boys from their tenth studio album, Yes (2009). It was released by Parlophone on 16 March 2009 as the album's lead single and debuted at number 14, becoming Pet Shop Boys' last top 20 hit on the UK Singles Chart. "Love Etc." was the duo's ninth number-one entry on Billboard magazine's Hot Dance Club Songs chart, with Pet Shop Boys overtaking Depeche Mode for the record of the most dance chart-toppers by a duo or group in August 2009.

== Background and composition ==
"Love Etc." was co-written by Pet Shop Boys with songwriting and production team Xenomania. The music was based on a track that Xenomania had written for another project, which they played at their initial meeting with the duo. Chris Lowe wanted to use it on Yes, and head producer Brian Higgins agreed. They collaborated on the track with the intention of releasing it as the album's first single.

The song is in 6/8 time, and it has a shuffle rhythm. Pet Shop Boys also made a remix of the song in 4/4 time. Neil Tennant wrote the lyrics with the Xenomania team, including Miranda Cooper, in a call and response format.

Pet Shop Boys described "Love Etc." as "a post-lifestyle anthem which sounds like nothing we've done before". The message of the song is that love is more important than seeking fame or acquiring material possessions. The lyrics mention the artist Gerhard Richter, whose work inspired the cover art of the album and single. The title, which is not in the lyrics, came from an email Tennant received from an old friend signed "Love etc."

== Release ==
"Love Etc." was released on 16 March 2009 and sold 13,644 copies in its first week in the UK. The song was on BBC Radio 2's primary A List, and Absolute Radio played it on their second-tier B List. It was the duo's 41st hit song, peaking at number 14 on the UK Singles Chart. In the liner notes of the 2017 reissue Yes: Further Listening 2008–2010, it was noted: "'Love etc.' would be the Pet Shop Boys last Top 20 hit to date, and by the time they released 'Together' [2010] at the very end of this period, because of how both British radio and the way that the charts were compiled had changed as technology and patterns of music consumption evolved, it was no longer likely that a Pet Shop Boys single would reach the Top 40".

The single came in CD and digital formats. The two-track CD included a new song, "Gin and Jag", as a B-side. Digital releases included the bonus track "We're All Criminals Now", a song about the killing of Jean Charles de Menezes by police at Stockwell tube station. A Remixes EP featured tracks by Gui Boratto, Kurd Maverick, and Frankmusik, as well as Pet Shop Boys' own mix.

On 24 March 2009, "Love Etc." was released digitally by Astralwerks as the duo's first single in the United States since "Break 4 Love" in 2001.

=== Artwork ===
The sleeve for the single was designed by Mark Farrow with Pet Shop Boys. The image (pictured) consists of three pink X shapes representing kisses. The single has a white background and the Remixes EP has a black background. The shapes are made of squares in different shades of pink in a style similar to the cover art of Yes, which features a tick mark formed with colored squares. Pet Shop Boys were inspired by the stained glass window at Cologne Cathedral designed by Gerhard Richter, who is mentioned in "Love Etc."

== Music video ==
The music video was directed by Dutch digital artist Han Hoogerbrugge. Animated versions of Tennant and Lowe are shown bouncing like space hoppers between different levels of a video game landscape, in time to the bouncy beat of the track. The duo were filmed in a brief session in January 2009 to capture their expressions.

The website Stereogum described it as a "horizontally scrolling animated video [that] is part Sonic The Hedgehog (dated video game reference!) and part Pac Man (chomping down on hearts, shamrocks, and cash money), with a lineup of Chrisses, Neils, and others shouting, flexing, unmasking, and turning into draculas."

== Critical reception ==
Anthony Strutt of Pennyblackmusic described "Love Etc." as "what the band do best, having a big pop sound and massive summery beats to chase our colds away… A welcome return which builds on from their usual sound". Nick Levine of Digital Spy wrote: "It's not the firecracker many were hoping for, but this perky electropop shuffle, with its call-and-response chorus and "love is for free" message, really hits home the third or fourth time you hear it".

Reviewers for The Singles Jukebox gave the single an average score of 7.22 out of 10. Ian Mathers gave the highest score of 9, commenting: "This might be their best single since the mind-bendingly great "Flamboyant," and like that song it sees the band in a reflective, advice giving mood, one that suits them surprisingly well". Giving the lowest score of 5, Edward Okulicz described "Love Etc." as "A relatively slight song, but flashes of excellence; the slightly sinister plinky backing and the call and response chorus are both fine. Some problems though: the first verse's melody doesn’t suit Neil Tennant's voice at all … and the lyrics are frankly awful in places…" M.H. Lo gave it a score of 7, observing: "It's a clichéd sentiment, especially from a band that once wrote a song ("If There Was Love," for Liza Minnelli) to rebut the Beatles' "All You Need Is Love." The unfulfilled promise of the lyric, sadly, is representative: while still above-average, this track falls short of being one of the band's best". Hillary Brown also rated the single 7, calling it "Quietly marvelous stuff that taps just the right mildly melancholic vein without ever becoming depressing".

== Track listings ==
"Love Etc." is written by Neil Tennant, Chris Lowe, Brian Higgins, Miranda Cooper, Tim Powell, and Owen Parker. All other tracks are by Tennant/Lowe.

- UK CD single
1. "Love Etc." – 3:32
2. "Gin and Jag" – 4:29
- UK and German CD single – The Remixes
1. "Love Etc." (album version) – 3:32
2. "Love Etc." (Pet Shop Boys Mix) – 6:17
3. "Love Etc." (Gui Boratto Mix) – 8:03
4. "Love Etc." (Kurd Maverick Mix) – 5:55
5. "Love Etc." (Frankmusik Star & Garter Dub) – 3:21
6. "Love Etc." (Kurd Maverick Dub) – 5:54
- UK and German iTunes single
1. "Love Etc." – 3:32
2. "We're All Criminals Now" – 3:55
- UK and German iTunes EP
1. "Love Etc." (Pet Shop Boys Mix) – 6:16
2. "Love Etc." (Gui Boratto Mix) – 8:02
3. "Love Etc." (Kurd Maverick Mix) – 5:54
4. "Love Etc." (Frankmusik Star & Garter Dub) – 3:21
- US iTunes single
1. "Love Etc." – 3:32
2. "We're All Criminals Now" – 3:55
3. "Gin and Jag" – 4:28
- US iTunes remix EP
1. "Love Etc." (Pet Shop Boys Mix) – 6:16
2. "Love Etc." (Gui Boratto Mix) – 8:02
3. "Love Etc." (Kurd Maverick Mix) – 5:54
4. "Love Etc." (Frankmusik Star & Garter Dub) – 3:21
5. "Love Etc." (Kurd Maverick Dub) – 5:53

== Credits and personnel ==
Credits adapted from the liner notes of Yes.

- Neil Tennant – lead vocals
- Chris Lowe – keyboards, programming
- Brian Higgins – production, keyboards, programming
- Xenomania – production, backing vocals
- Jeremy Wheatley – mixing
- Tim Powell – keyboards, programming
- Fred Falke – keyboards, programming
- Matt Gray – keyboards, programming
- Owen Parker – keyboards, programming, guitars
- Sacha Collisson – keyboards, programming
- Dick Beetham – mastering

== Charts ==
=== Weekly charts ===
Weekly chart performance for "Love Etc."
Chart (2009)	Peak position
Austria (Ö3 Austria Top 40)	21
Belgium (Ultratip Bubbling Under Flanders)	18
Belgium (Ultratip Bubbling Under Wallonia)	24
Europe (European Hot 100 Singles)	25
Germany (GfK)	12
Hungary (Rádiós Top 40)	19
Hungary (Single Top 40)	6
Ireland (IRMA)	31
Japan (Japan Hot 100)	15
Mexico Ingles Airplay (Billboard)	42
Netherlands (Single Top 100)	76
Scotland Singles (OCC)	3
Slovakia Airplay (ČNS IFPI)	70
Sweden (Sverigetopplistan)	60
Switzerland (Schweizer Hitparade)	19
UK Singles (OCC)	14
US Dance Club Songs (Billboard)	1
US Dance Singles Sales (Billboard)	2
US Hot Singles Sales (Billboard)	2

=== Year-end charts ===
Year-end chart performance for "Love Etc."
Chart (2009)	Position
Germany (Official German Charts)	78
Hungary (Rádiós Top 40)	121
US Dance Club Songs (Billboard)	8

== See also ==
- List of Billboard Hot Dance Club Play number ones of 2009
