= Discovery: Live in Rio 1994 =

Live album by Pet Shop Boys
- Released: 30 April 2021
- Recorded: 11 December 1994
- Venue: Metropolitan (Rio de Janeiro, Brazil)
- Length: 93:18
- Label: Parlophone
- Director: Roberto Berliner

Pet Shop Boys chronology
Hotspot (2020)	Discovery: Live in Rio 1994 (2021)	Lost (2023)

Discovery: Live in Rio 1994 is the fourth live album by English synth-pop duo Pet Shop Boys, released on 30 April 2021 by Parlophone. It was recorded in December 1994 in Rio de Janeiro, Brazil, as part of the Discovery Tour. It was originally released as a concert film on VHS and LaserDisc in 1995, before being reissued in its original standard-definition video format on DVD alongside the live album in 2021.

== Background ==
In 1994, Pet Shop Boys accepted an offer to tour Latin America and also booked dates in Singapore and Australia—all places they had never been before. The Discovery Tour, from 26 October to 12 December 1994, followed the remix album Disco 2, released in September, and the 1993 studio album Very, which they had not promoted with a tour at the time. The name "Discovery" was a combination of "disco" and "very". Their time in South America influenced the sound of their subsequent studio album, Bilingual (1996). The performance at the Metropolitan in Rio de Janeiro on 11 December 1994 was filmed by a local television crew and directed by Roberto Berliner as a TV Zero Brasil and Picture Music International presentation.

As a change from the structured, theatrical productions of the Pet Shop Boys' tours in 1989 and 1991, the Discovery Tour was more free-spirited, with a party atmosphere. The inspiration for the show came from The Sound Factory Bar in New York City, where the duo had seen dancers performing with live samba drummers. The Discovery Tour ensemble included vocalist Katie Kissoon; two percussionists, Liliana Chacian and Oli Saville; and four go-go dancers: Mirelle Diaz, Nicole Niciotis, Flavio Cecchetto, and Paulo Henrique. Go-go dancers were chosen because they had a more natural style than professionally trained dancers and could encourage the audience to join in. Choreographer Les Child joined the dancers in drag for the songs "Domino Dancing" (1988) and "West End Girls" (1985).

=== Song selection ===
The set list featured mainly uplifting songs that suited the Latin percussion. Six tracks from Very were included, along with familiar selections from earlier in their career. Pet Shop Boys covered two recent Eurodance hits in mashups with their own songs: Culture Beat's "Mr. Vain" (1993) was paired with "One in a Million" (1993) from Very, and Katie Kissoon sang Corona's "The Rhythm of the Night" (1993) in a medley with the 1988 single "Left to My Own Devices". Kissoon also sang Gloria Gaynor's disco classic "I Will Survive" (1978) as a prelude to "It's a Sin" (1987). The duo played a full cover version of "Girls & Boys" (1994) by Blur which they had remixed earlier that year. Their recent charity single "Absolutely Fabulous" (1994) was played in sync with clips of Jennifer Saunders and Joanna Lumley saying lines from the television show.

An acoustic set, with Neil Tennant on guitar, was composed of early singles "Rent" (1987) and "Suburbia" (1986). Tennant described the interlude as what Pet Shop Boys might sound like if they were invited on MTV Unplugged. Chris Lowe took centre stage to perform a new version of his 1986 B-side "Paninaro" with additional lyrics.

For the encore, the ensemble returned, wearing silver pointy hats encircled with rings of light, and played their hit single "Go West" (1993). After a brief reprise of the music, Tennant introduced the performers and then joined Lowe for the final song, "Being Boring" (1990). In the film, the 1959 song "Together (Wherever We Go)", performed by Ethel Merman, was used over the end credits.

=== Production design ===
Tennant described the tour as a "costume greatest hits", featuring looks from past productions, such as the moptop wigs from the music video of "I Wouldn't Normally Do This Kind of Thing" (1993) and white costumes with fezzes from the "Absolutely Fabulous" video. The red papal robes worn by Tennant for "It's a Sin" were originally designed by Annie Symonds for their 1989 tour. The pointy hats in the finale were patterned after those from the video for "Can You Forgive Her?" (1993). The hats also featured in the set design in the form of two cone-shaped cages. The stage had a raised platform in the back for the percussionists and a flight of lighted stairs for entrances.

Derek Jarman's projections, created for the 1989 tour, were used for the songs "Domino Dancing", "Paninaro", "King's Cross" (1987), and "It's a Sin". Howard Greenhalgh created additional footage based on his music videos for "I Wouldn't Normally Do This Kind of Thing", "Can You Forgive Her?", "Go West", and "Liberation" (1993). Footage from the videos for "Absolutely Fabulous", by Greenhalgh and Bob Spiers, and "Being Boring", by Bruce Weber, were also shown.

== Release ==
The original video recording of Discovery: Live in Rio was released on 7 August 1995. A preview of the concert had been broadcast on BBC Radio One on 29 May. In July, a new version of "Paninaro", arranged by Lowe for the Discovery Tour, was released as a single to promote the B-sides compilation album Alternative, which also came out on 7 August. Pet Shop Boys' live version of Blur's "Girls & Boys" from the tour film was a B-side. The concert video debuted number 24 on the Combined Video Chart in the UK and at number 3 on the Music Video Chart.

On 30 April 2021, the concert recording was reissued as a double CD and DVD package. The audio was digitally remastered. The film was restored on DVD in standard definition as it had been filmed, instead of upscaling to high definition for release on Blu-ray, in order to preserve the integrity of the original. The DVD was presented in NTSC format with a region code of 0, playable worldwide. The film was certified as "suitable only for 15 years and over" by the British Board of Film Classification due to sexualised images. The reissued Discovery: Live in Rio 1994 peaked at number 31 on the UK Albums Chart.

=== Artwork and packaging ===
The cover art used for both releases (pictured) was designed by Mark Farrow and used the colours of the Brazilian flag. The photo in the blue section, taken by Andy Earl, shows the tips of the metallic pointy hats encircled with light rings that were worn during the finale. The 2021 reissue included a booklet with candid photos and an interview with the duo by journalist Chris Heath, along with a transcription of Tennant's tour diary.

== Critical reception ==
Professional ratings
Review scores
Source	Rating
AllMusic	4/5 stars
Clash	9/10
Pitchfork	8.1/10

Reviewing the album for AllMusic, Paul Simpson called the release on CD and DVD "long overdue" and the concert "electric", writing that "the duo know when to dial the energy down a notch from time to time, so that everyone involved avoids the risk of short circuiting and burning out" and "the arrangements totally embrace the type of hyper-glitzy Euro-dance which was everywhere at the time". Emma Harrison of Clash felt that the concert "showcases their musical prowess with ease", describing it as "an exhilarating celebration of Neil Tennant and Chris Lowe's illustrious back catalogue". Nadine Smith of Pitchfork complimented the "queerer take" on Blur's 1994 song "Girls & Boys", as well as Tennant and Lowe "seamlessly" mashing up their own tracks "One in a Million" and "Left to My Own Devices" with "contemporary club cuts" "Mr. Vain" by Culture Beat and "The Rhythm of the Night" by Corona, respectively. Smith also felt that by doing reinterpretations of other's work as well as their own, the duo "suggest pop's potential as a living medium beyond recorded product, a songbook of standards that express universal sentiments but are open to individual reinterpretation". She concluded that "In their hands, the setlist becomes a collage, curating a century of pop music history in one jukebox."

== Track listing ==
All tracks are written by Neil Tennant and Chris Lowe unless otherwise noted.

Discovery: Live in Rio 1994 disc one track listing
No.	Title	Writer(s)	Length
1.	"Tonight Is Forever"		1:59
2.	"I Wouldn't Normally Do This Kind of Thing"		3:46
3.	"Always on My Mind"	Wayne Carson; Mark James; Johnny Christopher	4:14
4.	"Domino Dancing"		3:54
5.	"To Speak Is a Sin"		4:59
6.	"One in a Million / Mr. Vain"	Tennant; Lowe; Steven Levis; Nosie Katzmann; Jay Supreme	4:46
7.	"Paninaro"		4:27
8.	"Rent"		3:10
9.	"Suburbia"		3:11
10.	"King's Cross"		5:00
11.	"So Hard"		4:05
Total length:			43:41

Disc two
No.	Title	Writer(s)	Length
1.	"Left to My Own Devices / Rhythm of the Night"	Tennant; Lowe; Francesco Bontempi; Annerley Emma Gordon; Giorgio Spagna; Pete Glenister; Michael Gaffey	5:59
2.	"Absolutely Fabulous"	Tennant; Lowe; Jennifer Saunders; Joanna Lumley	3:51
3.	"Liberation"		4:09
4.	"West End Girls"		4:38
5.	"Can You Forgive Her?"		3:56
6.	"Girls & Boys"	Damon Albarn; Graham Coxon; Alex James; Dave Rowntree	4:55
7.	"It's a Sin / I Will Survive"	Tennant; Lowe; Freddie Perren; Dino Fekaris	6:48
8.	"Go West"	Jacques Morali; Henri Belolo; Victor Willis	5:11
9.	"Go West (Reprise)"		4:46
10.	"Being Boring"		5:24
Total length:			49:37; 93:18

== Personnel ==
Personnel are adapted from the introductions and credits of Discovery: Live in Rio 1994.

Pet Shop Boys

- Chris Lowe
- Neil Tennant

Additional performers

- Pete Gleadall – keyboards, programming, guitar ("Suburbia")
- Katie Kissoon – vocals
- Liliana Chacian – percussion
- Oli Saville – percussion
- Mirelle Diaz – dancer
- Nicole Niciotis – dancer
- Flavio Cecchetto – dancer
- Paulo Henrique – dancer
- Les Child – additional dancer ("Domino Dancing", "West End Girls")

Tour and creative personnel

- Abigail Rosen Holmes – production design, lighting design
- Ivan Kushlick – tour manager
- Nick Levitt – production manager
- Les Child – choreographer
- Claire Eastman – choreographer
- Lynne Easton – hair, make-up
- Alan Keyes – wardrobe, costumes
- David Fielding – costume design ("Liberation", "I Wouldn't Normally Do This Kind of Thing")
- Annie Symons – costume design ("It's a Sin")
- Robbie McGrath – FOH sound
- John Shearman – monitor engineer
- Derek Simpson – keyboard technician
- Mark England – lighting crew chief
- Steve Farrer – projection technician

TV Zero personnel

- Roberto Berliner – director
- Renato Pereira – executive producer
- Joao Alegria – assistant director
- Flavio Ferreira – director of photography
- Rômulo Marinho – production director
- Gustavo Hadba – camera operator
- Paulo Violeta – camera operator
- Paulo Santos – camera operator
- Andre Pinto – camera operator
- Jacques Cheuiche – camera operator
- Zeze D'Alice – sound technician

Archival footage

- Bruce Weber – film director ("Being Boring")
- Howard Greenhalgh – film director ("I Wouldn't Normally Do This Kind of Thing", "Can You Forgive Her?", "Go West", "Liberation", "Absolutely Fabulous")
- Derek Jarman – film director ("Paninaro", "It's a Sin", "King's Cross", "Domino Dancing")
- Bob Spiers – film footage ("Absolutely Fabulous")

Post Production

- Bob Kraushaar – sound production, mixing
- Pete Gleadall – sound production, mixing
- Warren Meneely – editor

2021 Edition

- Trish McGregor – DVD authoring, restoration
- Rob Osborne – DVD authoring, restoration
- Andy Baldwin – mastering

Artwork and packaging

- Mark Farrow – album design, art direction
- Andy Earl – cover photography
- Chris Heath – tour photography, interview
- Chris Lowe – tour photography

== Charts ==
Chart performance for Discovery: Live in Rio 1994
Chart (2021)	Peak position
Belgian Albums (Ultratop Flanders)	108
Belgian Albums (Ultratop Wallonia)	81
German Albums (Offizielle Top 100)	42
Scottish Albums (OCC)	10
Spanish Albums (PROMUSICAE)	42
UK Albums (OCC)	31
