= Disco 2 =

Remix album by Pet Shop Boys
- Released: 12 September 1994
- Recorded: 1990–1994
- Genres: Electronica; house; techno
- Length: 47:58
- Label: Parlophone
- Producers: Pet Shop Boys; Danny Rampling; Rollo; Beatmasters; DJ Pierre; Farley & Heller; E Smoove; David Morales; Junior Vasquez; Jam & Spoon

Pet Shop Boys chronology
Very (1993)	Disco 2 (1994)	Alternative (1995)

Disco 2 is the second remix album by English synth-pop duo Pet Shop Boys, released on 12 September 1994 by Parlophone. It consists of remixes of songs from the duo's albums Behaviour (1990) and Very (1993), as well as B-sides from the time.

A "club-ready sequel" to Disco (1986), as well as a "companion of sorts" to the Very/Relentless set of 1993, Disco 2 was released to mixed reviews. It reached number six on the UK Albums Chart.

== Background and composition ==
The tracks on the CD were mixed into one long continuous megamix by DJ Danny Rampling. As a result, most of the tracks are in edited versions, having been cut off mid-way through in a crossfade into the following tracks (as a DJ might do while mixing music live). Some of the tracks were reduced by more than half of their original lengths in this way. In addition, some tracks were sped up or slowed down, in order to match the overall tempo of the mix.

A limited edition of the album was released in the United States which contained a second CD with B-sides and additional mixes.

Though the album is a DJ mix by Rampling, mention of this only appears on the inner sleeve. Considered one of EMI's autumn 1994 highlights, Disco 2 was promoted from its September release through to Christmas. An earlier remix album, also titled Disco 2, was due for release in 1988 following the release of Actually (1987) and was to contain extended versions of Pet Shop Boys songs. The duo cancelled the album in protest at EMI including their cover of "Always on My Mind" – intended for inclusion on Disco 2 – on Now That's What I Call Music 11, against the duo's wishes.

== Critical reception ==
=== Contemporary response ===
Professional ratings
Initial reviews (in 1994)
Review scores
Source	Rating
Accrington Observer	5/5 stars
Knoxville News Sentinel	3/5 stars
The Leader-Telegram	3/5 stars
Music Week	4/5 stars
NME	4/10
Select	2/5 stars

In his review of Disco 2, Johnny Dee of NME wrote that it "works as a party album, an album you can leave on for an hour of comedy dances, trancing and Italo house-style raving while you and your mates get drunk", and considered it passable as a budget-priced remix album. However, he believed it to be disappointing as a follow-up to Very, criticising how many of the tracks "endlessly repeat one stuttering phrase", and also considered the interspersed samples of Absolutely Fabulous characters Edina Monsoon and Patsy Stone to be "very poor". Believing that the Pet Shop Boys were the only popular pop act to treat their dancefloor remixes as "more than just something to stick on those CD2-out-next-Tuedsay things", Andrew Harrison of Select commented on the high expectations for Disco 2 – built by the first Disco album and Introspective (1988). Nonetheless, he deemed it more like a Pet Shop Boys edition of the Journeys by DJ mixtape series, and believed that Rampling had lost the drama and humour of the original tracks, as well as "the songs, which PSB remixes never normally fully abandon". He recommended that readers buy the Very twelve-inch singles instead.

Douglas Wolk of CMJ New Music Monthly wrote that, on release, Disco 2 was the highest-profile DJ-centred mix CD available. He believed that the album's lengthy flow of "mixes and dubs" is "almost too smooth and clean to bear. You may move your hips, but you won't feel the urge to grind them into anything." Music Week called it both a "belated follow-up" to Disco and a "47-minute megamix" which should sell well. A reviewer for Accrington Observer called it the "second stomping disco album from the kings of the remixes" and believed that the Pet Shop Boys' distinctive sound had been reworked for a "must buy" set. Reviewing Disco 2 for St. Louis Post-Dispatch, J.D. Considine enjoyed the inclusion of two songs unavailable of otherwise, and praised how the remixes are "more like re-inventions" than mere repackages of the original versions, "sometimes just changing the original's mood, sometimes reducing the whole to a few essential hooks". Though believing those who favour singer Neil Tennant's dry tenor would feel let down, as his voice is wholly absent from some tracks, he concluded that the album's "beat-savvy production and disco-ready megamix format make it a party unto itself."

In The Herald-Sun, Howard Cohen said the album's lengthy mix of "techno, Eurodisco and house" remixes was "perfect for clubs but can be stultifying at home", adding that some remixes rendered the original versions unrecognisable. Ultimately, he wrote that Disco 2 is "fine for the young and energetic who can keep up with the mega-beats-per-minute mixes". The Leader-Telegram reviewer Chuck Campbell opines that it proves the duo's "post-'88 viality and their adaptability to change with fashion", and commented on how DJs could play the album and "take a 47 minute break", due to the lack of segues. However, he believed some fans may be "overwhelmed by Tennant's nasal singing" over such a length. In a short review, Jonathan Takiff of The Philadelphia Daily News included Disco 2 in a list of albums to ignore and quipped: "Don't quit your night job, boys." Reviewing the "Yesterday, When I Was Mad" single, released to promote the remix album, Hitmakers described Disco 2 as "ultra hip" and added that Junior Vasquez' remix is "on fire," while the Jam & Spoon mix is "totally cool".

=== Retrospective appraisal ===
Professional ratings
Retrospective reviews (after 1994)
Review scores
Source	Rating
AllMusic	2/5 stars
Christgau's Consumer Guide	(dud)
Encyclopedia of Popular Music	2/5 stars
The Great Rock Discography	5/10
Spin Alternative Record Guide	6/10

In a retrospective review, AllMusic's Stephen Thomas Erlewine described Disco 2 as "more long-winded" than the first Disco album, "suffering not only from too many pointless remixes, but a surprising lack of cohesiveness, making it for devoted fans only." In a review of its follow-up Disco 3 (2003), Drowned in Sound's Mark Reed dismissed Disco 2 as an "unimaginatively-titled medley" of techno remixes. Martin C. Strong, writing in The Great Rock Discography (2006), commented that Disco 2 and the B-sides collection Alternative (1995) mark a period in which the duo kept a "fairly low profile" following the release of Very. He rated Disco 2 five out of ten, the same as Disco and higher than Disco 3. In Christgau's Consumer Guide: Albums of the '90s (2000), Robert Christgau rated the album a "dud".

Rob Sheffield, in the Spin Alternative Record Guide (1995), rated Disco 2 six out of ten and posits it as one of two "cult-fodder items" that the Pet Shop Boys released following Very, the other being the "experimental ambient" Very/Relentless. In The Rolling Stone Album Guide (2004), Tom Hull felt that Disco and Disco 2 consisted of "mostly-third party remixes" that "rarely add much."

== Track listing ==
1. "Absolutely Fabulous" (Rollo Our Tribe Tongue-In Cheek Mix) – 0:29
2. "I Wouldn't Normally Do This Kind of Thing" (Beatmasters Extended Nude Mix) – 4:15
3. "I Wouldn't Normally Do This Kind of Thing" (DJ Pierre Wild Pitch Mix) – 2:59
4. "Go West" (Heller & Farley Project Mix) – 3:40
5. "Liberation" (E Smoove 12" Mix) – 6:09
6. "So Hard" (Morales Red Zone Mix) – 2:48
7. "Can You Forgive Her?" (Rollo Dub) – 4:03
8. "Yesterday, When I Was Mad" (Junior Vasquez Fabulous Dub) – 4:54
9. "Absolutely Fabulous" (Rollo Our Tribe Tongue-In Cheek Mix) – 6:01
10. "Yesterday, When I Was Mad" (Coconut 1 12" Mix) – 2:12
11. "Yesterday, When I Was Mad" (Jam & Spoon Mix) – 5:01
12. "We All Feel Better in the Dark" (Brothers in Rhythm After Hours Climax Mix) – 5:21 *Mislabeled. This is actually the Ambient Mix

=== US limited edition bonus CD ===
1. "Decadence" – 3:55
2. "Some Speculation" – 6:33
3. "Euroboy" – 4:28
4. "Yesterday, When I Was Mad" (RAF Zone Dub Mix) – 5:37
5. "I Wouldn't Normally Do This Kind of Thing" (7" Mix) – 4:45

== Charts ==
Chart performance for Disco 2
Chart (1994)	Peak position
Australian Albums (ARIA)	181
Austrian Albums (Ö3 Austria)	35
Dutch Albums (Album Top 100)	54
European Albums (Music & Media)	28
Finnish Albums (Suomen virallinen lista)	15
German Albums (Offizielle Top 100)	47
Japanese Albums (Oricon)	23
Scottish Albums (Official Charts)	15
Swedish Albums (Sverigetopplistan)	21
Swiss Albums (Schweizer Hitparade)	33
UK Albums (Official Charts)	6
US Billboard 200	75

== Sales ==
Sales for Disco 2
Region	Certification	Certified units/sales
Brazil	—	50,000
United States	—	131,000
