= Alternative (album) =

Compilation album by Pet Shop Boys
- Released: 7 August 1995
- Recorded: 1985–1994
- Length: 134:12
- Label: Parlophone
- Producer: Pet Shop Boys

Pet Shop Boys chronology
Disco 2 (1994)	Alternative (1995)	Bilingual (1996)

Singles from Alternative
- 1. "Paninaro '95" Released: 24 July 1995

Alternative is a compilation album by English synth-pop duo Pet Shop Boys, released on 7 August 1995 by Parlophone. The two-disc set consists of 30 B-sides of singles from 1985 to 1994, arranged in chronological order. It reached number two on the UK Albums Chart. To promote the album, a remake of "Paninaro", originally the B-side of "Suburbia" (1986), was released as a single titled "Paninaro '95". A follow-up B-sides album called Format was released in February 2012, covering the years 1996 to 2009.

== Artwork and packaging ==
Alternative was released as a double CD, including a limited edition box set; a double cassette; and a triple LP box set. The cover (pictured) features photographs of Neil Tennant and Chris Lowe in fencing masks, taken by Richard Burbridge. The first copies have a lenticular image on the cover which alternates between the two faces. Designer Mark Farrow came up with the idea when the album title was changed to Alternative after the pictures had already been taken. The packaging was nominated for a Grammy Award for Best Boxed or Special Limited Edition Package in 1996.

The liner notes include an interview with the duo about each song by music journalist Jon Savage.

== Critical reception ==
Professional ratings
Review scores
Source	Rating
AllMusic	4.5/5 stars
Robert Christgau	(2-star Honorable Mention)
Melody Maker	(favorable)
NME	6/10
Select	4/5 medals
The Sydney Morning Herald	4/5 stars

David Price of Hi-Fi World described Alternative as a chronicle of the duo's "shift from early hi-NRG to their mid-period lbithan house fixation and their subsequent pop classicism. En route we get an eclectic mix of melancholy and madness – 'In The Night' ... explores the world of beatniks in occupied wartime France(!), 'Paninaro' the mid-Eighties Italian casual-fashion scene. 'It Must be Obvious' is Tennant artfully swiping back at those who'd wished to out him, while 'Miserablism' is an irreverent two fingered salute at humourless critics".

Several reviews commented on the quality of the Pet Shop Boys' B-sides in their overall songwriting output. Shane Danielsen of The Sydney Morning Herald observed: "With admirable symmetry, the best singles band in the world prove to also make the best B-sides. This companion piece to their Discography best-of is, predictably, somewhat less even, though equally linear, tracing their evolution as the most humane synth-pop band ever". Robert Christgau rated it two out of three on his "Honorable Mention" scale, denoting consumers "may well enjoy", and described the compilation as "two discs of marginalia proving what?--that Very could have been more amazing yet?"

Stephen Thomas Erlewine of AllMusic noted: "Far from being a superfluous collection, the album contains a wealth of prime material, including several tracks that surpass those the duo put on their albums". Andrew Harrison of Select wrote: "Line up 30 of most bands' B-sides in chronological order and you'll need matchsticks under your eyelids. But this is the Pettoes we're talking about, so puckish wit, cavalier experimentation and the latest in funny noises reign". He concluded, "these B-sides shame plenty of people's career peaks".

== Track listing ==
All tracks are written by Neil Tennant and Chris Lowe, except where noted.

Disc one
No.	Title	Writer(s)	A-side	Length
1.	"In the Night"		"Opportunities (Let's Make Lots of Money)" (1985 release)	4:50
2.	"A Man Could Get Arrested" (10" Bobby Orlando version)		"West End Girls"	4:19
3.	"That's My Impression" (disco mix)		"Love Comes Quickly"	5:18
4.	"Was That What It Was?"		"Opportunities (Let's Make Lots of Money)" (1986 release)	5:14
5.	"Paninaro"		"Suburbia"	4:40
6.	"Jack the Lad"		"Suburbia"	4:31
7.	"You Know Where You Went Wrong"		"It's a Sin"	5:51
8.	"A New Life"	Tennant, Lowe, Helena Springs	"What Have I Done to Deserve This?"	4:56
9.	"I Want a Dog"		"Rent"	4:58
10.	"Do I Have To?"		"Always on My Mind"	5:14
11.	"I Get Excited (You Get Excited Too)"		"Heart"	4:54
12.	"Don Juan"		"Domino Dancing"	3:54
13.	"The Sound of the Atom Splitting" (extended version)	Tennant, Lowe, Steve Lipson, Trevor Horn	"Left to My Own Devices"	5:12
14.	"One of the Crowd"		"It's Alright"	3:55
15.	"Your Funny Uncle"		"It's Alright"	2:16

Disc two
No.	Title	Writer(s)	A-side	Length
1.	"It Must Be Obvious"		"So Hard"	4:24
2.	"We All Feel Better in the Dark"		"Being Boring"	4:00
3.	"Bet She's Not Your Girlfriend"		"Where the Streets Have No Name (I Can't Take My Eyes off You)"	4:28
4.	"Losing My Mind"	Stephen Sondheim	"Jealousy"	4:34
5.	"Music for Boys"		"DJ Culture"	3:36
6.	"Miserablism"		"Was It Worth It?"	4:10
7.	"Hey, Headmaster"		"Can You Forgive Her?"	3:06
8.	"What Keeps Mankind Alive?"	Bertolt Brecht, Kurt Weill	"Can You Forgive Her?"	3:24
9.	"Shameless"		"Go West"	5:02
10.	"Too Many People"		"I Wouldn't Normally Do This Kind of Thing"	4:17
11.	"Violence" (Haçienda version)		"I Wouldn't Normally Do This Kind of Thing"	4:58
12.	"Decadence"		"Liberation"	3:56
13.	"If Love Were All"	Noël Coward	"Yesterday, When I Was Mad"	2:59
14.	"Euroboy"		"Yesterday, When I Was Mad"	4:27
15.	"Some Speculation"		"Yesterday, When I Was Mad"	6:34

Japanese edition bonus track
No.	Title	Writer(s)	A-side	Length
16.	"Girls & Boys" (live in Rio)	Damon Albarn, Graham Coxon, Alex James, Dave Rowntree	"Paninaro '95"	5:03

== Personnel ==
- Neil Tennant
- Chris Lowe

Producers

- Pet Shop Boys – all tracks except disc 1: track 13
- Phil Harding – disc 1: track 1
- Bobby O – disc 1: track 2
- Shep Pettibone – disc 1: track 7, additional production on disc 1: track 4
- David Jacob – disc 1: track 8
- Trevor Horn and Stephen Lipson – disc 1: track 13
- Harold Faltermeyer – disc 2: track 6
- Stephen Hague – additional production on disc 2: tracks 7 and 9
- Jonathon Ruffle – disc 2: track 8
- Richard Niles – disc 2: track 13

Guest musicians

- Blue Weaver – Fairlight programming on disc 1: tracks 1 and 11, Hammond organ on disc 1: track 11
- Adrien Cook – Fairlight programming on disc 1: tracks 5, 6 and 7
- Helena Springs – additional vocals on disc 1: track 7
- Stephen Lipson – guitar on disc 1: track 11
- Shirley Lewis and Dee Lewis – additional vocals on disc 1: track 11
- Chris Newman – assistant Fairlight programming on disc 1: track 12, additional programming on disc 2: track 4
- Juliet Roberts – additional vocals on disc 2: track 2
- Dominic Clarke – programming on disc 2: tracks 2 and 3
- Gary Maughan – additional keyboards on disc 2: track 3
- Scott Davidson – programming on disc 2: track 5
- Harold Faltermeyer – programming on disc 2: track 6
- Pete Gleadall – programming on disc 2: tracks 7, 9, 10, 11, 12, 14 and 15
- Richard Coles – additional keyboards on disc 2: track 8
- Carol Kenyon, Katie Kissoon and Tessa Niles – additional vocals on disc 2: track 9
- Bruce Woolley – additional vocals on disc 2: track 10
- J.J. Belle – guitar on disc 2: track 11
- Sylvia Mason-James – additional vocals on disc 2: track 11
- Johnny Marr – guitar on disc 2: track 12
- Frank Ricotti – percussion and vibraphone on disc 2: track 12
- Richard Niles – string arrangement and conduction on disc 2: track 12, arrangement and conduction on disc 2: track 13
- Tony Walthers, Daniel Gaha & Lance Ellington – backing vocals on disc 2: track 13
- Gerard Presencer – trumpet solo on disc 2: track 13

Artwork

- Mark Farrow – concept and design, graphic design
- Phil Sims – concept and design
- Rob Petrie – concept and design
- Peter Mauder – graphic design
- Richard Burbridge – mask photography
- Eric Watson – interview portraits

== Charts ==
Chart performance for Alternative
Chart (1995)	Peak position
Australian Albums (ARIA)	8
Austrian Albums (Ö3 Austria)	33
Belgian Albums (Ultratop Flanders)	44
Belgian Albums (Ultratop Wallonia)	44
Canada Top Albums/CDs (RPM)	29
Dutch Albums (Album Top 100)	27
European Albums (Music & Media)	37
Finnish Albums (Suomen virallinen lista)	17
German Albums (Offizielle Top 100)	28
Japanese Albums (Oricon)	31
Scottish Albums (Official Charts)	7
Swedish Albums (Sverigetopplistan)	14
Swiss Albums (Schweizer Hitparade)	19
UK Albums (Official Charts)	2
US Billboard 200	103

== Certifications and sales ==
Certifications and sales for Alternative
Region	Certification	Certified units/sales
United Kingdom (BPI)	Silver	60,000^{^}
United States	—	68,000
^{^} Shipments figures based on certification alone.
