= Yesterday, When I Was Mad =

1994 single by Pet Shop Boys

Single by Pet Shop Boys

from the album Very
- B-side: "If Love Were All"; "Some Speculation"; "Euroboy"
- Released: 30 August 1994
- Genre: Hi-NRG; disco; pop
- Length: 3:55
- Label: Parlophone
- Songwriters: Neil Tennant; Chris Lowe
- Producer: Pet Shop Boys

Pet Shop Boys singles chronology
"Absolutely Fabulous" (1994)	"Yesterday, When I Was Mad" (1994)	"Paninaro '95" (1995)

Alternative cover
- Alternate UK single cover

Music video
- "Yesterday, When I Was Mad" on YouTube

"Yesterday, When I Was Mad" is a song by English synth-pop duo Pet Shop Boys, released as the fifth and final single from their fifth studio album, Very (1993), on 30 August 1994 by Parlophone. The single, both written and produced by Neil Tennant and Chris Lowe, peaked at number 13 on the UK Singles Chart, number four on the US Billboard Dance Club Play chart and became a number-one hit in Israel. The song was remixed by Jam & Spoon for its single release, among other things removing a compression effect applied to Tennant's voice during the verses. Its music video was directed by Howard Greenhalgh, depicting a straitjacket-clad Tennant trapped in a surreal psychiatric hospital.

== Composition ==
"Yesterday, When I Was Mad" is about the stresses of touring and how being away from loved ones can make musicians unwilling to trust others or carry on with their career, contrasting it with the humour of ironic, pretentious, or rude things people say to touring musicians. Tennant has said that many of the lines in the song, such as "And someone said, 'It's fabulous you're still around today—you've both made such a little go a very long way!'", actually happened. Speaking to NME in 1993, Tennant commented that the song was "basically about the strange things that happened to us when we were on the last tour", in reference to the 1991 Performance Tour, which is chronicled in Pet Shop Boys versus America by Chris Heath.

== Critical reception ==
Dave Jennings of Melody Maker named "Yesterday, When I Was Mad" as one of the magazine's "singles of the week", calling it a "magnificent piece of bitchery" with "glorious lyrics". He remarked, "Pet Shop Boys aren't exactly the first band you'd expect to write a brilliant rock 'n' roll on-the-road song; but that's just what they've done here, skewering the sycophants and patronising slimeballs hanging around their tour with malicious delight." Alan Jones from Music Week gave the song a score of three out of five, calling it "a bright tongue-in-cheek romp, but its galloping disco style makes few concessions to melody." David Quantick from NME said, "My theory is that they are now entering a period of being completely barking mad. This single bears it out, with its Noël Coward cover and its Broadway hell version of 'Can You Forgive Her?'."

Brad Beatnik from the Record Mirror Dance Update noted, "This duo seem to be getting more excited about dance mixes with each single they put out. This one, another idiosyncratic and charming pop song, has about eight mixes." Another Record Mirror editor, James Hamilton, named it a "hi-NRG galloper" in his weekly dance column. Stuart Maconie from Select wrote, "Their flair for a catty joke is generously displayed on 'Yesterday When I Was Mad', where the duo are dissected by a media harpy while mad acid house whips the drama along." Jonathan Bernstein from Spin viewed it as "a wry litany of faint praise with which the pair have been damned". Sylvia Patterson from Smash Hits gave it a full score of five out of five and named it Best New Single, writing, "All of this we expect, but this one's their campest techno-fevered thunder-stomp with 100% whistleability for ages."

Retrospectively, Tom Ewing of Freaky Trigger calls it the "joke" track on Very and the most overt example of the album's highly maximalist sound, writing that it "feels like ten different productions layered on each other." Ned Raggett, also of Freaky Trigger, groups it among the album's more theatrical tracks, citing its "spotlight's-on-me-chorus", and felt that, "in a weird way", it almost resembles Queen's "I'm Going Slightly Mad" (1991). Trouser Press critic Ira Robbins compares the track's musical style to Carter the Unstoppable Sex Machine, citing this as an example of recent musical developments making an impact on Very. In 2023, Alexis Petridis of The Guardian ranked "Yesterday, When I Was Mad" as the Pet Shop Boys' 29th best song, calling it the wittiest song ever written about the downside of touring and adding that it is "very funny and very aware of its privileged preposterousness."

== Music video ==
A music video was produced to promote the single. It was directed by British director of music videos and advertising Howard Greenhalgh, and as with his previous videos for the Very campaign, makes prominent use of computer graphics. The video was filmed on 21 July 1994 at Westminster Hospital, which was closed at the time, and West Middlesex Hospital, which was in use. Taking the song's theme of "madness" to mean insanity rather than anger, it features a straitjacket-clad Tennant trapped in a surreal psychiatric hospital, all the while being taunted by a tuxedo-wearing version of himself, who represents the critic in the song's lyrics. Lowe's head appears as a hanging lamp; his image was scanned by computer to generate the effect; whilst saturated colours were added in to give the video a nightmarish, unsettling quality.

== B-sides ==
B-sides include a cover of the Noël Coward song "If Love Were All", arranged by Richard Niles and featuring a trumpet solo by Gerard Presencer, and two new songs, "Some Speculation" and "Euroboy".

=== "Euroboy" ===
"Euroboy" is a dance track written by Tennant and Lowe in the Eurodance mould of such bands as Cappella and Livin' Joy. The track includes Lowe in one of his rare lead-vocals performances, singing through a vocoder. He claimed to have been unaware at the time of release that Euroboy was also the name of a softcore gay pornographic magazine.

"Euroboy" later appeared on the US release of the album Disco 2, the B-side collection Alternative, and the 2001 two-disc re-release, Very: Further Listening 1992–1994. It was occasionally performed live on the Asian leg of the band's 1994 Discovery tour.

== Track listings ==
- UK CD1
1. "Yesterday, When I Was Mad" – 3:59
2. "If Love Were All" – 2:58
3. "Can You Forgive Her?" (swing version) – 4:53
4. "Yesterday, When I Was Mad" (Jam & Spoon mix) – 9:20
- UK CD2
1. "Yesterday, When I Was Mad" (Coconut 1 remix) – 4:05
2. "Some Speculation" – 6:33
3. "Yesterday, When I Was Mad" (Junior Vasquez Factory dub) – 8:19
4. "Yesterday, When I Was Mad" (RAF Zone dub) – 5:37
- UK 12-inch single

A1. "Yesterday, When I Was Mad" (Jam & Spoon mix) – 9:20
B1. "Yesterday, When I Was Mad" (Junior Vasquez Factory dub) – 9:17
B2. "Yesterday, When I Was Mad" (RAF Zone dub) – 6:20

- UK cassette single and European CD single
1. "Yesterday, When I Was Mad" – 3:59
2. "Euroboy" – 4:28
- US maxi-CD single
1. "Yesterday, When I Was Mad" (Jam & Spoon mix)
2. "Yesterday, When I Was Mad" (Coconut 1 12-inch mix)
3. "Yesterday, When I Was Mad" (Raf Zone mix)
4. "Yesterday, When I Was Mad" (Junior Vasquez Fabulous dub)
5. "Euroboy"
6. "Some Speculation"
- US 2×12-inch single

A1. "Yesterday, When I Was Mad" (Jam & Spoon mix) – 9:20
B1. "Yesterday, When I Was Mad" (Junior Vasquez Factory dub) – 9:17
B2. "Yesterday, When I Was Mad" (Junior Vasquez Body dub) – 3:58
C1. "Yesterday, When I Was Mad" (Junior Vasquez Fabulous dub) – 8:19
C2. "Yesterday, When I Was Mad" (RAF Zone mix) – 6:39
D1. "Yesterday, When I Was Mad" (Coconut 1 12-inch mix) – 8:22
D2. "Euroboy" – 4:28

- Australian CD single
1. "Yesterday, When I Was Mad"
2. "If Love Were All" – 2:58
3. "Can You Forgive Her?" (swing version) – 4:53
4. "Yesterday, When I Was Mad" (Jam & Spoon mix) – 9:20
5. "Absolutely Fabulous"
- Australian cassette single
1. "Yesterday, When I Was Mad" – 3:59
2. "Euroboy" – 4:28
3. "Absolutely Fabulous"

== Charts ==
=== Weekly charts ===
Weekly chart performance for "Yesterday, When I Was Mad"
Chart (1994–1995)	Peak position
Australia (ARIA)	13
Belgium (Ultratop 50 Flanders)	25
Europe (Eurochart Hot 100)	39
Europe (European Dance Radio)	1
Europe (European Hit Radio)	35
Finland (Suomen virallinen lista)	4
Germany (GfK)	72
Israel (Israeli Singles Chart)	1
Netherlands (Dutch Top 40)	35
Netherlands (Single Top 100)	28
Scottish Singles Sales (Official Charts)	20
UK Singles (Official Charts)	13
UK Dance (Official Charts)	16
UK Airplay (Music Week)	17
UK Dance (Music Week)	16
UK Club Chart (Music Week)	41
US Dance Club Songs (Billboard)	4
US Dance Singles Sales (Billboard)	27

=== Year-end charts ===
Year-end chart performance for "Yesterday, When I Was Mad"
Chart (1994)	Position
Israel (Israeli Singles Chart)	10

== Release history ==
Release dates and formats for "Yesterday, When I Was Mad"
Region	Date	Format(s)	Label(s)	Ref(s).
United Kingdom	30 August 1994	12-inch vinyl; CD; cassette	Parlophone	
Australia	10 October 1994	CD; cassette	Parlophone	
