= Liberation (Pet Shop Boys song) =

1994 single by Pet Shop Boys

Single by Pet Shop Boys

from the album Very
- B-side: "Decadence"; "Young Offender"
- Released: 5 April 1994
- Length: 4:05
- Label: Parlophone
- Songwriters: Neil Tennant; Chris Lowe
- Producer: Pet Shop Boys

Pet Shop Boys singles chronology
"I Wouldn't Normally Do This Kind of Thing" (1993)	"Liberation" (1994)	"Absolutely Fabulous" (1994)

Music video
- "Liberation" on YouTube

"Liberation" is a song by English synth-pop duo Pet Shop Boys, released on 5 April 1994 by Parlophone as the fourth single from their fifth studio album, Very (1993). It peaked at number 14 on the UK Singles Chart, making it the lowest-charting single from Very in the United Kingdom. Its accompanying music video was directed by Howard Greenhalgh using computer-generated imagery.

== Background and composition ==
"Liberation" is a love song on the theme of "live for today". The melody was written by Neil Tennant and was inspired by the opening notes of the piano piece "Friar Laurence" from Prokofiev's Romeo and Juliet. J.J. Belle played guitar on the track, and Anne Dudley wrote and conducted an orchestra arrangement.

== Release ==
The single was released on CD, cassette, and 7-inch and 12-inch vinyl formats. The B-side, "Decadence", featured Johnny Marr on guitar and Frank Ricotti on percussion and vibraphone, with a string arrangement by Richard Niles. Additional bonus tracks included remixes of the album track "Young Offender" by Jam & Spoon and of "Liberation" by E Smoove and Murk.

A live version of "Liberation" is on Discovery: Live in Rio 1994 (1995), re-released on DVD and CD in 2021. "Decadence" was included on the re-release Very: Further Listening: 1992–1994 and the B-sides compilation Alternative.

=== Artwork ===
The cover art used computer-generated forms from the music video, created by rotating the duo's profiles 360 degrees to form solid objects that appear to be spinning. Chris Lowe's image is orange (pictured), and Tennant's is blue. The back covers used offset text boxes in orange or blue to create an impression of motion, while the remix covers used close-ups of the heads.

The portraits are reminiscent of Renato Bertelli's "Continuous profile of Mussolini" (1933), a ceramic bust with the profile rotated in a similar manner.

== Critical reception ==
In his weekly UK chart commentary, James Masterton wrote, "The single makes a strong showing, not least due to the fact that the gorgeous ballad is one of the best tracks from the album. What gives it an extra boost is the innovating virtual reality video, currently touring the country in a roadshow whereby punters can climb into a booth and experience the state of the art computer graphics at first hand. Even the standard 2D version is a wonder to behold, whatever happens to the single it is surely a candidate for video of the year." Sarra Manning from Melody Maker felt it's "a bit limp and lifeless after the oomphing crescendoes of 'Go West' and 'Can You Forgive Her?' Still, it's harmless enough in a Chianti-grooved, falsetto kind of way."

Alan Jones from Music Week gave the song a score of four out of five and named it Pick of the Week, saying, "Sleek and sophisticated in its original mix, expensive strings underscore Neil Tennant's typically mournful vocals. [...] The fourth hit from the PSBs album Very, and a big one." Johnny Cigarettes of NME wrote, "This single will witness few embarrassing tongue cavortings around youth club discos, because apart from a particularly divine chord change in the bridge, this is simply too laid-back and Sunday afternoon snooze-ish to reach the intended heart strings. The tune's hardly a gasser either." Mark Sutherland from Smash Hits also gave it four out of five, writing, "This is not the Pettoes at the absolute pinnacle of their powers, but 'Liberation' still has more than enough going for it to merit mass swooning. [...] This is a touchingly tender tinkle through an achingly sad song, with Neil's vocals at their very wispiest, so may I suggest a smart top hat and tails, in day-glo lilac with matching feather dusters. The song's absolutely marvellous, by the way." Jonathan Bernstein from Spin remarked its "sigh of surrender".

== Music video ==
The music video for "Liberation", directed by British director Howard Greenhalgh, is almost entirely CG, an early example of exclusively CG output. The only live-action footage the video features is Neil Tennant's face, seen singing on gold circles. Other features in the video are reminiscent of the duo, including several disembodied heads and figures all wearing tall pointy caps (like those seen in the video for "Can You Forgive Her?") and animated versions of the 3D renderings of the duo's silhouettes that were also used on the single covers. The video was used as part of CyberWorld, an early 3D cinema demonstration, on IMAX screens across the UK and elsewhere in 2000 and 2001.

== Track listings ==
- UK and Australian CD1
1. "Liberation"
2. "Decadence"
3. "Liberation" (E Smoove mix)
4. "Liberation" (E Smoove 7-inch edit)
- UK and Australian CD2
1. "Liberation" (Murk Deepstrumental mix)
2. "Liberation" (Oscar G's Dopeassdub mix)
3. "Young Offender" (Jam & Spoon Trip-o-Matic Fairy Tale mix)
4. "Decadence" (unplugged mix)
- UK 7-inch and cassette single; European CD single
1. "Liberation" – 4:06
2. "Decadence" – 3:55
- UK 2×12-inch single

A1. "Liberation" (E Smoove 7-inch edit)
B1. "Liberation" (Murk Deepstrumental mix)
B2. "Liberation" (Oscar G's Dopeassdub mix)
B3. "Liberation" (Murk dirty club mix)
C1. "Young Offender" (Jam & Spoon Trip-o-Matic Fairy Tale mix)
D1. "Young Offender" (Remix No 2)

== Personnel ==
Personnel are adapted from the liner notes for Very: Further Listening 1992–1994 and "Liberation".

Pet Shop Boys

- Chris Lowe
- Neil Tennant

Additional musicians

- J.J. Belle – guitar
- Pete Gleadall – programming
- Anne Dudley – orchestra arrangement, conducting

Technical personnel

- Pet Shop Boys – production
- Stephen Hague – additional production, mixing
- Mike "Spike" Drake – mixing
- Bob Kraushaar – engineering
- Pete Gleadall – engineering

Artwork

- Mark Farrow – design
- Why Not Films – design
- Soho 601 FX – design
- David Fielding – design
- IQ Videographics – design
- Pet Shop Boys – design

== Charts ==
=== Weekly charts ===
Weekly chart performance for "Liberation"
Chart (1994)	Peak position
Australia (ARIA)	63
Europe (Eurochart Hot 100)	27
Europe (European AC Radio)	13
Europe (European Hit Radio)	11
Finland (Suomen virallinen lista)	8
Germany (GfK)	51
Iceland (Íslenski Listinn Topp 40)	18
Ireland (IRMA)	22
Israel (Israeli Singles Chart)	1
Scottish Singles Sales (Official Charts)	23
UK Singles (Official Charts)	14
UK Airplay (Music Week)	2
UK Club Chart (Music Week)	28

=== Year-end charts ===
Year-end chart performance for "Liberation"
Chart (1994)	Position
Israel (Israeli Singles Chart)	49
UK Singles (OCC)	193

== Release history ==
Release dates and formats for "Liberation"
Region	Date	Format(s)	Label(s)	Ref.
United Kingdom	5 April 1994	7-inch vinyl; CD; cassette	Parlophone	
United Kingdom	25 April 1994	2×12-inch vinyl	Parlophone	
Australia	16 May 1994	CD1; cassette	Parlophone	
Australia	30 May 1994	CD2	Parlophone	
