= Absolutely Fabulous (song) =

1994 single by Pet Shop Boys

Single by Absolutely Fabulous
- B-side: "Absolutely Dubulous"; "This Wheel's on Fire"
- Released: 31 May 1994
- Genre: Disco; house; techno pop
- Length: 3:46
- Label: Parlophone; Spaghetti
- Songwriters: Neil Tennant; Chris Lowe; Jennifer Saunders; Joanna Lumley
- Producer: Pet Shop Boys

Pet Shop Boys singles chronology
| "Liberation" (1994) | "Absolutely Fabulous" (1994) | "Yesterday, When I Was Mad" (1994) |

"Absolutely Fabulous" is a song by English synth-pop duo Pet Shop Boys, released in May 1994 by Parlophone and Spaghetti Records as a single for 1994's Comic Relief under the artist name "Absolutely Fabulous". The song is based on the BBC sitcom of the same name created by Jennifer Saunders and features sound bites taken from the first series of the show.

The single peaked at number six on the UK Singles Chart and number seven on the US Billboard Dance Club Play chart. It was more successful in Oceania, debuting and peaking at number two in both Australia and New Zealand. In Australia, it is Pet Shop Boys' highest-charting single, and in both countries, it was their last top-10 entry. The accompanying music video was directed by Howard Greenhalgh and Bob Spiers.

== Releases ==
Apart from its release as a single, the song "Absolutely Fabulous" also appears on the "Further Listening" disc that came with the 2001 reissue of the Pet Shop Boys album Very. The music video clip of the song features on Pet Shop Boys' video compilation Various, available on VHS, as well as on the AbFab DVD collection of series one through three. The Our Tribe Tongue-In-Cheek Mix version of the song features on the band's Disco 2 album.

== Critical reception ==
In his weekly UK chart commentary, James Masterton wrote, "It is ostensibly a comedy record but few comedy records claim to possess as much dancefloor credibility as this one." He added, "Now its stars, Jennifer Saunders and Joanna Lumley team up with the Pet Shop Boys to make this dance track, interspersed with sampled dialogue from the TV series along with various posturings from Edina and Patsy of which 'Techno Techno Bloody Techno Darling!' is possibly a highlight..." Pan-European magazine Music & Media described it as "a Pet Shop electro popper". Alan Jones from Music Week gave it a full score of five out of five and named it Single of the Week, adding, "The Pet Shop Boys have done a splendid job assembling some memorable snippets from the TV series' Patsy and Edina over a relentless disco beat. All profits from the single – which are likely to be considerable – go to Comic Relief. A potential number one."

Ian Gittins of Melody Maker felt that, with the song, the duo had "lowered their impeccable standards for the very first time". He wrote, "The Pet Shops sound as lusciously as ever, but Tennant's usual Mike-Leigh-down-the-disco existential witticisms (sadly missing here) are infinitely preferable to Saunders and Lumley reciting tired catchphrases and making jokes about 'Pump Up the Volume' a mere, uh, five years after MARRS had the hit. And Jennifer, darling, sweetie; the words 'caviar', 'Moet' and 'Vogue', set to a house beat, are not per se funny." Rupert Howe from NME commented, "Pats 'n' Edi rope in Neil 'n' Chris for a one-off slice of charidee cheese which will bounce straight into the Top Ten thanks to a Pet Shop production that's tighter than the skin over Pats' cheekbones. There's not much to it, of course — snippets of the series' cringeworthy hack PR-speak jostle for spare with a few cheeky Black Box/M/A/R/R/S/2 Unlimited references". James Hamilton from the Record Mirror Dance Update described it as "Jennifer Saunders & Joanna Lumley samples studded romping techno pop" in his weekly dance column.

== Music video ==
The music video for "Absolutely Fabulous" was directed by British and Scottish directors Howard Greenhalgh and Bob Spiers. It features the Pet Shop Boys, wearing white suits, white hats and sunglasses, performing while Absolutely Fabulous characters Edina and Patsy (Jennifer Saunders and Joanna Lumley) dance around them. Clips from the first two original TV series are interspersed throughout the video.

== Track listings ==
- UK and Australian CD single
1. "Absolutely Fabulous" (7-inch mix)
2. "Absolutely Fabulous" (Our Tribe Tongue-in-Cheek mix)
3. "Absolutely Dubulous"
4. "Absolutely Fabulous" (Dull Soulless Dance Music mix)
- Withdrawn UK CD single
1. "Absolutely Fabulous" (7-inch mix)
2. "Absolutely Fabulous" (Our Tribe Tongue-in-Cheek mix)
3. "Absolutely Dubulous"
4. "This Wheel's on Fire"

This CD was withdrawn due to copyright legalities for "This Wheel's on Fire".

- UK 7-inch and cassette single
1. "Absolutely Fabulous" (7-inch mix)
2. "Absolutely Fabulous" (Dull Soulless Dance Music mix)
- UK 12-inch single

A1. "Absolutely Fabulous" (Our Tribe Tongue-in-Cheek mix)
A2. "Absolutely Dubulous"
B1. "Absolutely Fabulous" (7-inch mix)
B2. "Absolutely Fabulous" (Dull Soulless Dance Music mix)

== Charts ==
=== Weekly charts ===
Weekly chart performance for "Absolutely Fabulous"
| Chart (1994) | Peak position |
|---|---|
| Australia (ARIA) | 2 |
| Europe (Eurochart Hot 100 Singles) | 28 |
| Finland (Suomen virallinen lista) | 8 |
| Ireland (IRMA) | 18 |
| Israel (Israeli Singles Chart) | 2 |
| Netherlands (Dutch Top 40 Tipparade) | 14 |
| Netherlands (Single Top 100 Tipparade) | 5 |
| New Zealand (Recorded Music NZ) | 2 |
| Scottish Singles Sales (Official Charts) | 24 |
| Sweden (Sverigetopplistan) | 36 |
| UK Singles (Official Charts) | 6 |
| UK Airplay (Music Week) | 19 |
| UK Dance (Music Week) | 11 |
| US Dance Club Songs (Billboard) | 7 |

=== Year-end charts ===
Year-end chart performance for "Absolutely Fabulous"
| Chart (1994) | Position |
|---|---|
| Australia (ARIA) | 57 |
| UK Singles (OCC) | 111 |

== Certifications ==
Certifications for "Absolutely Fabulous"
| Region | Certification | Certified units/sales |
|---|---|---|
| Australia (ARIA) | Gold | 35,000^{^} |
| New Zealand (RMNZ) | Gold | 5,000^{*} |
^{*} Sales figures based on certification alone.^{^} Shipments figures based on certification alone.

== Release history ==
Release dates and formats for "Absolutely Fabulous"
| Region | Date | Format(s) | Label(s) | Ref. |
|---|---|---|---|---|
| United Kingdom | 31 May 1994 | CD | Parlophone; Spaghetti | |
| Australia | 11 July 1994 | CD; cassette | Parlophone; Spaghetti | |
