= Very (Pet Shop Boys album) =

Studio album by Pet Shop Boys
- Released: 27 September 1993
- Recorded: 1992–1993
- Studios: Sarm West (London); Angel (London) (Note: Orchestra); Power Station (New York City) (Note: Choir on "Go West")
- Genres: Synth-pop; dance-pop; techno
- Length: 53:17
- Label: Parlophone
- Producer: Pet Shop Boys

Pet Shop Boys chronology
Discography: The Complete Singles Collection (1991)	Very (1993)	Disco 2 (1994)

Singles from Very
- 1. "Can You Forgive Her?" Released: 1 June 1993; 2. "Go West" Released: 6 September 1993; 3. "I Wouldn't Normally Do This Kind of Thing" Released: 29 November 1993; 4. "Liberation" Released: 5 April 1994; 5. "Yesterday, When I Was Mad" Released: 30 August 1994

Very is the fifth studio album by English synth-pop duo Pet Shop Boys, released on 27 September 1993 by Parlophone, nearly three years after the duo's previous studio album, Behaviour, and following the compilation album Discography: The Complete Singles Collection. It is the only Pet Shop Boys album to reach number one on the UK Albums Chart, and it produced two top ten singles, "Can You Forgive Her?" and "Go West". Very exhibits one of many turning points the Pet Shop Boys would make to their music, shifting from the subdued electronic pop of Behaviour to richly instrumented dance arrangements. The content and lyrics led to Very being called their "coming-out" album, since it was during this time that Neil Tennant had publicly discussed his long-rumoured homosexuality.

== Background and release ==
"Generally this album is very, very up, much more so than any album we've ever done. There's one song, 'Dreaming of the Queen', which is very sad, but generally it's more poppy."

— Neil Tennant discussing the album's mood.

Pet Shop Boys made Very in reaction to their previous album Behaviour, which was critically well-received but not as commercially successful as their earlier releases. In particular, "Being Boring", which the duo had considered one of their strongest tracks, was their least successful single at the time, peaking at number 20 on the UK charts. In the United States, their 1991 Performance Tour initially received mixed reviews and did not improve the ranking of Behaviour, which only reached 45 on the US Billboard 200. Journalist and close friend of the duo Chris Heath documented the American leg of the tour in his book Pet Shop Boys Versus America, noting Chris Lowe's comment, "We should write another good dance album, write Behaviour off as a tax loss".

After taking a break in 1992, Pet Shop Boys set out to make an uplifting, dance-pop album in contrast to the style of Behaviour. They worked on songs at Lowe's home studio and finished them at Sarm West. Pet Shop Boys produced Very themselves, with mixing and additional production by Stephen Hague. The title was meant to convey that the album was 'very Pet Shop Boys', but a different Pet Shop Boys. EMI representative Tony Wadsworth recalled in the 2006 documentary Pet Shop Boys: A Life in Pop that when the record label first heard the songs on Very, "the smiles lit up the room because it was so obviously commercial yet still very high quality".

To promote Very, the duo shed their naturalistic image and adopted a new look, creating an artificial, cartoonish world with visuals designed by David Fielding. This idea was a reaction against the grunge movement of the time, and it incorporated the growing popularity of video games. They wore surreal costumes, like the orange jumpsuits with tall dunce caps for "Can You Forgive Her?", and their music videos, directed by Howard Greenhalgh, made use of the CGI available at the time.

To date, Very is the Pet Shop Boys' most commercially successful album in the UK; it reached number one on the UK Albums Chart shortly after its release. In addition, all singles released from the album entered the top 20 of the UK Singles Chart, including "Go West", which remains one of the duo's highest-charting singles. In the United States, Very debuted at number 20 on the Billboard 200 album chart, an improvement on Behaviour. The singles failed to chart on the Billboard Hot 100 but performed better on the dance charts. This was seen partly as a result of the rise of grunge and alternative rock on American radio.

=== Very Relentless ===
A limited-edition double album, Very Relentless, was released simultaneously. The bonus disc, Relentless, contains six tracks that are more experimental and instrumental. There were plans to expand upon Relentless in 1994 by releasing the six tracks along with others, making a full dance album, but this evolved into Disco 2. The six tracks were not released elsewhere until Relentless was remastered and reissued as a standalone EP in 2023, although the original version of "Forever in Love" can be found on Very: Further Listening 1992–1994. "Forever in Love" uses the same sample as "One Love" by The Prodigy, "Arabic Chant (Allah)" from the Zero-G sample library compilation Datafile One.

=== Other releases ===
Very was re-released on 3 July 2001 as Very: Further Listening 1992–1994. The reissue was digitally remastered and includes a second disc featuring B-sides and previously unreleased material. A remastered single-disc edition of Very, containing only the 12 original tracks, was released in 2009. In 2018, a newly remastered edition of Very: Further Listening 1992–1994 was released, with the same contents as the 2001 edition.

=== Packaging ===
The original release of Very was packaged in a unique orange jewel case with raised bumps (sometimes unofficially described as the Lego case), designed by Daniel Weil of Pentagram in London. Very Relentless was similarly unique, with the two CDs in card sleeves (Very in orange and Relentless in pink) with both of these housed in a translucent rubber case with raised bumps.

The case for Very was featured in the 1995 Museum of Modern Art (MoMA) exhibition "Mutant Materials in Contemporary Design".

The album was reissued in 1996 in a standard jewel case with a new sleeve showing an image of the original case.

== Critical reception ==
Professional ratings
Review scores
Source	Rating
AllMusic	4.5/5 stars
Chicago Tribune	4/4 stars
Entertainment Weekly	A−
Los Angeles Times	2.5/4 stars
NME	9/10
Q	4/5 stars
Rolling Stone	4/5 stars
The Rolling Stone Album Guide	4.5/5 stars
Select	5/5
The Village Voice	A

Writing for NME, David Quantick deemed Very "brilliant from start to finish" and "as moving and moved as any other Pet Shop Boys album, just more obviously so", noting a shift from the "melancholy" of Behaviour towards "a sense of, gulp, happiness." In Select, Stuart Maconie speculated that the album's "more lively" musical direction may have been motivated by the "muted" reception to Behaviour, and commented that "Very's beauty lies in the formidable yet effortless plate-spinning trick that lets gorgeous and vibrant pop tunes co-exist with rich, strange and complex conceits." David Bennun of Melody Maker noted that, after the "muted" and "distressingly grown up" sound of Behaviour, Very contains "track after track, dizzy with strings and brass, of the purest, most intelligent and, crucially, poppiest pop." Mat Snow of Q, meanwhile, wrote that Very confirms the Pet Shop Boys as "a group so tightly focused on its strengths to the exclusion of any meaningful experiment that it drives a coach and horses through the First Commandment of Pop, namely 'Thou Shalt Explore a New Direction on Every Album'."

Chicago Tribune critic Greg Kot opined that "Very qualifies as terrific pop on the strength of its music alone", and that "as its gay worldview unfolds—unapologetic yet unassuming, humorous yet touching, political yet personal—Very takes on the dimensions of a classic." J. D. Considine, reviewing Very for Rolling Stone, highlighted the social commentary and "mixed emotions" in its songs, concluding that "it's that sort of depth that makes Very worth hearing again and again." Entertainment Weekly's Greg Sandow considered the album "very understated musically" but also "very deeply felt", while The Village Voice's Robert Christgau found that Tennant's lyrics showed a newfound romantic sincerity: "Convinced cornballs may still find his emotions attenuated, but I say the production values suit the tumult in his heart and the melodies the sweetness in his soul." Less impressed was Dennis Hunt of the Los Angeles Times, who said that Very "is listenable and danceable, but overall it sounds as if their creativity has petered out—they're recycling these days rather than creating."

In the 2004 Rolling Stone Album Guide, Tom Hull noted that Very was released to more uniformly positive reviews from critics than Behaviour, which he attributed to its more uptempo sound and "unusually direct" love songs, "with most making more sense gay than not." AllMusic's Stephen Thomas Erlewine stated in retrospect that "Very is one of their very best records, expertly weaving between the tongue-in-cheek humor of 'I Wouldn't Normally Do This Kind of Thing,' the quietly shocking 'Can You Forgive Her?,' and the bizarrely moving cover of the Village People's 'Go West.'" Tom Ewing of Freaky Trigger contextualised Very as a response to the duo's fading popularity and increasing age – "they know they basically have one more shot at making a great pop album which forces its way into the public consciousness, which gets and earns coverage in Smash Hits as well as respectful write-ups in the broadsheets. And Very is their attempt at that album, the last event Pet Shop Boys record." Ewing noted that, as a result, the album has an "ultra-maximal" sound and many of the songs feel like big statements, deeming it "so close to being a triumph, and the ambition of it is glorious".

In June 2000, Q placed Very at number 91 on its list of "The 100 Greatest British Albums Ever". The album was also included in the book 1001 Albums You Must Hear Before You Die.

== Track listing ==
All tracks are written by Neil Tennant and Chris Lowe, except where noted.

No.	Title	Writer(s)	Length
1.	"Can You Forgive Her?"		3:53
2.	"I Wouldn't Normally Do This Kind of Thing"		3:03
3.	"Liberation"		4:05
4.	"A Different Point of View"		3:26
5.	"Dreaming of the Queen"		4:19
6.	"Yesterday, When I Was Mad"		3:55
7.	"The Theatre"		5:10
8.	"One and One Make Five"		3:30
9.	"To Speak Is a Sin"		4:45
10.	"Young Offender"		4:50
11.	"One in a Million"		3:52
12.	"Go West" (includes the hidden track "Postscript (I Believe in Ecstasy)" at 7:07, after 2 minutes of silence)	Jacques Morali; Henri Belolo; Victor Willis; Tennant^{[a]}; Lowe^{[a]}	8:22

Relentless (bonus disc)
No.	Title	Length
1.	"My Head Is Spinning"	6:33
2.	"Forever in Love"	6:19
3.	"KDX 125"	6:25
4.	"We Came from Outer Space"	5:24
5.	"The Man Who Has Everything"	6:01
6.	"One Thing Leads to Another"	6:24

Further Listening 1992–1994 (bonus disc)
No.	Title	Writer(s)	Length
1.	"Go West" (1992 twelve-inch mix) (previously unreleased)	Morali; Belolo; Willis; Tennant^{[a]}; Lowe^{[a]}	9:12
2.	"Forever in Love" (previously unreleased)		5:44
3.	"Confidential" (demo for Tina)		4:47
4.	"Hey, Headmaster"		3:06
5.	"Shameless"		5:04
6.	"Too Many People"		4:25
7.	"I Wouldn't Normally Do This Kind of Thing" (seven-inch version)		4:45
8.	"Violence" (Haçienda version)		5:00
9.	"Falling" (demo for Kylie) (previously unreleased)		4:38
10.	"Decadence"		3:55
11.	"If Love Were All"	Noël Coward	3:00
12.	"Absolutely Fabulous" (single version)	Tennant; Lowe; Jennifer Saunders; Joanna Lumley	3:46
13.	"Euroboy"		4:30
14.	"Some Speculation"		6:34
15.	"Yesterday, When I Was Mad" (single version)		4:01
16.	"Girls and Boys" (live in Rio)	Damon Albarn; Graham Coxon; Alex James; Dave Rowntree	4:55

=== Notes ===
- ^{^[a]} signifies additional music and lyrics

== Personnel ==
Credits adapted from the liner notes of Very.

=== Pet Shop Boys ===
- Neil Tennant – vocals (tracks 1–12), keyboards (tracks 1–11, 13), additional lyrics (track 12)
- Chris Lowe – keyboards (tracks 1–11), backing vocals (track 10), additional lyrics (track 12), lead vocals (track 13)

=== Additional musicians ===
- Pete Gleadall – programming
- Anne Dudley – orchestra arrangement and conducting (tracks 3, 5, 7)
- Phil Todd, Chris Davis, John Barclay, John Thirkell, Mark Nightingale – brass (track 12)
- Richard Niles – brass arrangement, choir arrangement, additional keyboard arrangement (track 12)
- J.J. Belle – guitar (tracks 3, 12)
- Frank Ricotti – percussion (track 5)
- Sylvia Mason-James – additional vocals (tracks 7, 8, 11, 12)
- Dainton Connell – additional vocals (track 8)
- Carol Kenyon – additional vocals (tracks 9, 10)
- Katie Kissoon – additional vocals (track 10)
- Tessa Niles – additional vocals (track 10)
- Joanna Wyatt, Thomas Rogers, Laurie Smith, Jody Smith, Nigel Francis, Francis Hatson, Lee Harris, Lucy Clark, Marie-Claire Peterson, Victoria Ferher – choir (track 7)
- Scott Altman, James Bassi, Hugh Berberich, Rodne Brown, Maurizio Corbino, Martin Doner, Dan Egan, James Gandre, Paul Houghtaling, Michael Hume, Robert Kuehn, Drew Martin, Joseph Nelson Neal, Mark Rehnstrom, Steven Tachell, Frank Nemhauser (with thanks to Graeme Perkins and Jaqueline Pierce) – choir (track 12)

=== Technical ===
- Pet Shop Boys – production
- Stephen Hague – additional production, mixing
- Brothers in Rhythm – additional production (track 12)
- Mike "Spike" Drake – mixing
- Bob Kraushaar – engineering, vocal recording
- Pete Gleadall – engineering
- Sam Hardaker, Richard Lowe, Howard Bargroff, Robin Barclay – engineering assistance
- Tim Young – 2001 & 2018 remastering

=== Artwork ===
- Mark Farrow – graphic design
- Pet Shop Boys – graphic design
- Chris Nash – photographs
- David Fielding – costume and set design
- Pentagram – CD packaging, concept, design

== Charts ==
=== Weekly charts ===
Weekly chart performance for Very
Chart (1993)	Peak position
Australian Albums (ARIA)	2
Austrian Albums (Ö3 Austria)	6
Belgian Albums (IFPI)	5
Canada Top Albums/CDs (RPM)	9
Danish Albums (Hitlisten)	6
Dutch Albums (Album Top 100)	18
European Albums (Music & Media)	1
Finnish Albums (Suomen virallinen lista)	1
French Albums (IFOP)	19
German Albums (Offizielle Top 100)	1
Hungarian Albums (MAHASZ)	2
Icelandic Albums (Tónlist)	18
Irish Albums (IRMA)	7
Italian Albums (Musica e dischi)	8
Japanese Albums (Oricon)	14
New Zealand Albums (RMNZ)	19
Norwegian Albums (VG-lista)	8
Portuguese Albums (AFP)	7
Spanish Albums (AFYVE)	6
Swedish Albums (Sverigetopplistan)	1
Swiss Albums (Schweizer Hitparade)	1
UK Albums (Official Charts)	1
US Billboard 200	20

Weekly chart performance for Very Relentless
Chart (1993)	Peak position
Danish Albums (Hitlisten)	7
European Albums (Music & Media)	31
Swedish Albums (Sverigetopplistan)	17

Weekly chart performance for Relentless
Chart (2023)	Peak position
German Albums (Offizielle Top 100)	22
Scottish Albums (Official Charts)	6
Spanish Albums (Promusicae)	88
UK Albums (Official Charts)	25
UK Dance Albums (Official Charts)	2

=== Year-end charts ===
1993 year-end chart performance for Very
Chart (1993)	Position
Australian Albums (ARIA)	47
Canada Top Albums/CDs (RPM)	59
European Albums (Music & Media)	23
German Albums (Offizielle Top 100)	24
Swiss Albums (Schweizer Hitparade)	37
UK Albums (OCC)	29

1994 year-end chart performance for Very
Chart (1994)	Position
European Albums (Music & Media)	37
German Albums (Offizielle Top 100)	36
Swiss Albums (Schweizer Hitparade)	35

== Certifications and sales ==
Certifications and sales for Very
Region	Certification	Certified units/sales
Australia (ARIA)	Platinum	70,000^{^}
Austria (IFPI Austria)	Gold	25,000^{*}
Brazil	—	140,000
Canada (Music Canada)	Platinum	100,000^{^}
Finland	—	48,641
France (SNEP)	Gold	100,000^{*}
Germany (BVMI)	Platinum	500,000^{^}
Japan (RIAJ)	Gold	100,000^{^}
Spain (Promusicae)	4× Platinum	400,000^{^}
Sweden (GLF)	Gold	50,000^{^}
Switzerland (IFPI Switzerland)	Platinum	50,000^{^}
United Kingdom (BPI)	Platinum	300,000^{^}
United States (RIAA)	Gold	500,000^{^}
^{*} Sales figures based on certification alone.^{^} Shipments figures based on certification alone.
