= Howard Greenhalgh =

British music video director

- Born: Howard Douglas Greenhalgh; 19 February 1963 (age 63); Halifax, West Riding of Yorkshire, England
- Occupations: Music video director; commercial director; film director
- Years active: 1988–present

Howard Douglas Greenhalgh (born 19 February 1963) is a British director of music videos and advertising.

== Biography ==
Greenhalgh was born in Halifax, West Riding of Yorkshire and studied at the Royal College of Art, setting up the firm Why Not after graduating. He came to prominence in the early 1990s with his direction of the music video for the Snap! song "Rhythm is a Dancer". Greenhalgh then was hired by the Pet Shop Boys to direct videos for their successful album Very and later its follow-up Bilingual. His work has also included the video for George Michael's song 'Jesus to a Child', several videos for Muse, Placebo, Soundgarden and others.

His videos for Very make extensive and early use of computer animation and blue screen to create environments of geometric shapes and patterns in which the group members Neil Tennant and Chris Lowe are inserted. His clip for the song "Liberation" was later reused in the 2000 animation anthology CyberWorld. He later directed the video of Soundgarden's song 'Black Hole Sun', attracting attention in the United States; in 1995, Spin magazine awarded him a reader's choice award for best video for this.

He also directed music videos for Sandra for her fifth studio album Close To Seven in 1992.

Describing his approach to music video direction, Greenhalgh said in a 2010 interview that "With anything, it’s the lyrics that are everything. You pray that there are good lyrics in a track because that leads you immediately to what you’re going to do."

== Videography ==
=== 2024 ===
- "2 Become 1" - Emma Bunton

=== 2023 ===
- "These Are the Days" - S Club

=== 2018 ===
- "Let Somebody Love You" – Culture Club

=== 2017 ===
- "Scared of the Dark" – Steps
- "Rhythm Inside" – Calum Scott

=== 2011 ===
- "Run for Your Life" – Matt Cardle
- "Think About It" – Melanie C

=== 2010 ===
- "Blue Skies" – Jamiroquai
- "White Knuckle Ride" – Jamiroquai

=== 2009 ===
- "Devil on My Shoulder" – Billy Talent
- "In My Dreams" – Eels
- "For What It's Worth" – Placebo

=== 2007 ===
- "Folding Stars" – Biffy Clyro

=== 2006 ===
- "Bombs" – Faithless
- "Different World" – Iron Maiden
- "I Feel It" – Lorraine
- "Analogue (All I Want)" – A-ha

=== 2005 ===
- "Don't Look Back" – Lucie Silvas
- "Question!" – System of a Down (co-directed with Shavo Odadjian)
- "Demons" – Brian McFadden

=== 2004 ===
- "This Is the Last Time" – Keane
- "Caught in a Moment" – Sugababes

=== 2003 ===
- "Rainmaker" – Iron Maiden
- "Miracles" – Pet Shop Boys
- "Guilty" – Blue
- "Wildest Dreams" – Iron Maiden
- "This Picture" – Placebo
- "On the Horizon" – Melanie C
- "The Bitter End" – Placebo

=== 2001 ===
- "Destiny" – Zero 7
- "Let's Just Call It Love" – Lisa Stansfield
- "Special K" – Placebo
- "Plug In Baby" – Muse

=== 2000 ===
- "Slave to the Wage" – Placebo
- "Unintended" – Muse

=== 1999 ===
- "Lift Me Up" – Geri Halliwell
- "New York City Boy" – Pet Shop Boys
- "Everything Will Flow" – Suede
- "Lately" – Skunk Anansie
- "Beat Mama" – Cast

=== 1998 ===
- "Wildsurf" – Ash
- "Goodbye" – Spice Girls
- "Jesus Says" – Ash
- "Come with Me" – Puff Daddy feat. Jimmy Page
- "Furious Angels" – Rob Dougan

=== 1997 ===
- "Too Much" – Spice Girls
- "Congo" – Genesis
- "Just As You Are" – Feline
- "Post-Modern Sleaze" – Sneaker Pimps
- "Daylight Fading" – Counting Crows
- "A Red Letter Day" – Pet Shop Boys
- "Bruise Pristine" – Placebo
- "Nancy Boy" – Placebo

=== 1996 ===
- "Single-Bilingual" – Pet Shop Boys
- "Universal" – Orchestral Manoeuvres in the Dark
- "Walking on the Milky Way" – Orchestral Manoeuvres in the Dark
- "Forget About the World" – Gabrielle
- "Before" – Pet Shop Boys
- "Jesus to a Child" – George Michael

=== 1995 ===
- "Not a Dry Eye in the House" – Meat Loaf
- "I'd Lie for You (And That's the Truth)" – Meat Loaf
- "Paninaro '95" – Pet Shop Boys
- "Made in England" – Elton John
- "Please" – Elton John
- "Marta's Song" – Deep Forest

=== 1994 ===
- "The Wild Ones" – Suede
- "Yesterday, When I Was Mad" – Pet Shop Boys
- "Shoot All the Clowns" – Bruce Dickinson
- "Tears of the Dragon" – Bruce Dickinson
- "Black Hole Sun" – Soundgarden
- "This Cowboy Song" – Sting
- "Yearning" – Basia
- "Liberation" – Pet Shop Boys
- "Celebrate" – Horse
- "Girl U Want" – Robert Palmer

=== 1993 ===
- "I Wouldn't Normally Do This Kind of Thing" – Pet Shop Boys
- "Angel in the Snow" – A-ha
- "Go West" – Pet Shop Boys
- "Jean the Birdman" – David Sylvian and Robert Fripp
- "Can You Forgive Her?" – Pet Shop Boys
- "Captain Nemo" – Sarah Brightman
- "If I Ever Lose My Faith in You" – Sting

=== 1992 ===
- "Johnny Wanna Live" – Sandra
- "In Liverpool" – Suzanne Vega
- "Not Enough Time" – INXS
- "Rhythm Is a Dancer" – Snap!
- "Disappointed" – Electronic
- "Heart over Mind" – Kim Wilde
- "I Will Remember You" – Amy Grant
- "I Need Love" – Sandra
- "Don't Be Aggressive" – Sandra

=== 1991 ===
- "Rush" – Big Audio Dynamite II
- "The Rivers of Belief" – Enigma
- "Principles of Lust" – Enigma
- "De-Luxe" – Lush
- "If You Cared" – Kim Appleby
- "Dry Land" – Marillion

=== 1990 ===
- "Heart of the World" – Big Country
- "Save Me" – Big Country
- "(Life May Be) A Big Insanity" – Sandra
- "Arrested by You" – Dusty Springfield
- "Reputation" – Dusty Springfield
- "Mea Culpa (Part II)" – Enigma
- "Who's Afraid of the Big Bad Love?" – Wild Weekend
- "That's the Way of the World" – D Mob feat. Cathy Dennis

=== 1989 ===
- "Head On" – The Jesus and Mary Chain
- "Walking On Thin Ice" – Fuzzbox
- "Where in the World?" – Swing Out Sister
- "So Alive" – Love and Rockets
