= Go West (song) =

1979 single by Village People

Single by Village People

from the album Go West
- B-side: "Citizens of the World"
- Released: June 1979
- Genre: Disco
- Length: 4:10 (album version); 3:33 (single edit)
- Label: Casablanca
- Songwriters: Jacques Morali; Henri Belolo; Victor Willis
- Producer: Jacques Morali

Village People singles chronology
"In the Navy" (1979)	"Go West" (1979)	"Ready for the 80's" (1979)

Music video
- "Go West" on YouTube

"Go West" is a song by American disco group Village People, released in June 1979 by Casablanca Records as the second single from their fourth studio album of the same name (1979). The song was written by Jacques Morali, Henri Belolo and lead singer Victor Willis, while Morali produced it. It was successful in the disco scene during the late 1970s and a top-20 hit in Belgium, Ireland and the UK.

"Go West" found further success when it was covered in 1993 by English synth-pop duo Pet Shop Boys, with their version reaching No. 2 on the UK Singles Chart, and No. 1 in Germany, Sweden, Switzerland and Austria. It has since become a successful sport chant, especially in European football.

== Village People version ==
The song's title is attributed to the 19th-century quote "Go West, young man" commonly attributed to the American newspaper editor Horace Greeley, a rallying cry for the settlement and colonization of the American West, but also an invitation to pursue one's own dreams and individuality. The melody resembles that of the State Anthem of the Soviet Union (and later national anthem of Russia) composed by Alexander Alexandrov, and also shares some melodic elements with the Christian worship song "Give Thanks with a Grateful Heart" written by Henry Smith, and recorded by Don Moen.

Billboard said that "Having turned tongue-in-cheek plugs for the YMCA and the Navy into top three singles, pop's top jinglesmiths here wax enthusiastic about the wide open spaces of the West." Record World said that "the disco-pop hook is surrounded by a resounding harmony chorus accentuated by full-bodied production". Classic Rock History critic Brian Kachejian rated it the Village People's 6th greatest song.

In a landmark ruling in U.S. copyright law, on May 7, 2012, Victor Willis was awarded 33% of the copyright to "Go West" and other Village People hits, in accordance with the Copyright Act of 1976.

=== Charts ===
Weekly chart performance for "Go West"
Chart (1979)	Peak position
Belgium (Ultratop 50 Flanders)	12
Canada Top Singles (RPM)	41
Canada Dance/Urban (RPM)	13
Ireland (IRMA)	15
Netherlands (Dutch Top 40)	31
Netherlands (Single Top 100)	29
UK Singles (Official Charts)	15
US Billboard Hot 100	45
US Dance Club Songs (Billboard) "In the Navy"/"Manhattan Woman"/"Go West"	14

== Pet Shop Boys version ==
"Go West"

Single by Pet Shop Boys

from the album Very
- B-side: "Shameless"
- Released: September 6, 1993
- Recorded: 1992–1993
- Genre: Synth-pop
- Length: 8:21 (album version); 5:03 (single version); 9:10 (12-inch mix)
- Label: Parlophone
- Songwriters: Jacques Morali; Henri Belolo; Victor Willis; Neil Tennant (Note: Additional music and lyrics); Chris Lowe
- Producer: Pet Shop Boys

Pet Shop Boys singles chronology
"Can You Forgive Her?" (1993)	"Go West" (1993)	"I Wouldn't Normally Do This Kind of Thing" (1993)

Music video
- "Go West" on YouTube

In 1992, when Pet Shop Boys were asked by Derek Jarman to perform at an AIDS charity event at the Haçienda nightclub in Manchester, Chris Lowe of the duo selected "Go West" as the song they would perform. Though singer Neil Tennant was unable to remember the lyrics during that performance, the two decided to record it as a single.

=== Release ===
The original recording of "Go West", intended for release in 1992 as a non-album single, was never used. Instead, a different version was released on September 6, 1993, as the second single from Very, featuring the B-side "Shameless". Bonus tracks included remixes of "Go West" by Brothers in Rhythm, Farley & Heller, Kevin Saunderson, and Mark Stent. The album track of "Go West" on Very is 5:03 minutes, followed by 2 minutes of silence and the brief hidden track "Postscript", for a total of 8:21 minutes. The 12-inch mix of the 1992 version, and its intended B-side "Forever in Love", were released in 2001 on Very: Further Listening 1992–1994.

The single peaked at number two on the UK Singles Chart and number one in Finland, Germany and Iceland. The single also reached number one in Ireland, becoming the last of the duo's four Irish number-one singles to date, and topped the US Billboard Dance Music/Club Play Singles chart.

=== Changes ===
The new version enhances the basis of the original's chord progression in Pachelbel's Canon, bringing the theme to the forefront at the opening of the song. In addition to the Canon elements, it included a new introduction which Lowe later said "does sound surprisingly like the former Soviet anthem". The song also underwent extensive reworking of its instrumental tracks, with producers Stephen Hague and Mark Stent credited for the mixing, as well as an all-male Broadway choir arranged by Richard Niles (said by Tennant to be inspired by the song "There Is Nothing Like a Dame" from the Broadway musical South Pacific). In addition, Tennant and Lowe wrote a new coda and a bridge for the song, with the lyrics:

There where the air is free
we'll be what we want to be
Now if we make a stand
we'll find our promised land

=== Critical reception ===
Stephen Thomas Erlewine from AllMusic felt the song is a "bizarrely moving" cover. Larry Flick from Billboard magazine commented, "Nothing better captures the tone of bittersweet joy and drama that permeates Very than PSB's cover of the Village People nugget, 'Go West'. Covered with thick layers of pillowy synths, the track swaps the male-bonding vibe of the original with a wistful demeanor that's lined with a pensive subtext of loss". In the single review, he described it as a "gorgeous reading", adding that Neil Tennant "gives the happy, male-bonding lyrics a wistful, almost melancholy edge—an odd but successful contrast to the fist-waving chants at the chorus". Dave Sholin from the Gavin Report deemed it an "uptempo, melodic pop winner". Caroline Sullivan from The Guardian wrote that "Can You Forgive Her?" and "Go West" "are among the best singles of the year, the latter distinguishing itself by making the Village People original seem flagrantly heterosexual."

A reviewer from Lennox Herald declared it as a "90s update" of the disco anthem, and an "outside bet for the top spot". Liverpool Echo felt it's the "funniest thing they've done for ages", noting that it "comes complete with butch male chorus contrasting with the Pet Shop Boys' sweet and innocent vocals." In his weekly UK chart commentary, James Masterton remarked that the duo's cover "is affectionate rather than mocking but no less brilliant for it with Male Voice Choirs and Gospel Singers adding to what has to be one of the singles of the year." Everett True from Melody Maker named it Single of the Week, saying, "'Go West' is pure essence of Pet Shop Boys; an astoundingly immoderate cover [...] which manages the almost unbelievable feat of being camper than the original." Pan-European magazine Music & Media wrote, "The emperors of synth pop are backed by a Cossack choir. Blue helmets replace the Indian head dress and stetson, worn by the original singers of the song, the Village People." John Harris of NME named it "Complete Genius Single of the Week", and considered it a song that "combines the ostentatious playfulness last mastered by the KLF with the Pet Shop Boys' velvet-lined sumptuousness and an immeasurable poignancy".

Reading Evening Post remarked that "Seagulls and strings usher" in this version, adding that "it's insistent and instantly catchy, and brings to mind the song "YMCA" even without knowing who originally sang this track." They concluded that "Go West" "will obviously be a hit". Stuart Maconie from Select wrote, "Even 'Go West' succeeds by sheer force of personality when it could have been a camp bridge too far — PSBs in silly hats singing an old Village People song." Gavin Reeve from Smash Hits gave it two out of five, commenting, "Neil and Chris have dug up an old Village People hit from the '70s and changed it from a singalong disco number to a... singalong disco number." Jonathan Bernstein from Spin wrote, "It should be camp, ridiculous, and overblown. It is. But it's also curiously affecting. Tennant's wistful reading of the song's yearning for acceptance turns laughter at the surrounding bombast into a lump in the throat. You can only keep it bottled up for so long." David Petrilla from The Weekender said it "sounds like the Village People meet Al Stewart", adding, "expect to start marching in place and finding your arms up in the air when you hear it."

=== Music video ===
The accompanying music video for "Go West" was directed by British director Howard Greenhalgh and relies heavily on computer-generated imagery, like all of his videos for the Very singles. It begins with a red Statue of Liberty, and then depicts a grey city where the communist domination is evident on the basis of Soviet imagery such as red stars and red flags, the Yuri Gagarin Monument (a spaceman on a column) and the Monument to the Conquerors of Space (a rocket on a spire-like pedestal). Troops of identical Soviet men march up a staircase stretching into the clouds, seemingly toward a Western society, with the Statue of Liberty, now appearing as a black diva looming in the distance (played by backing-vocalist Sylvia Mason-James). Tennant and Lowe appear throughout; Tennant carries a blue-and-yellow striped arrow staff, and Lowe travels on a flying surfboard. Occasional live action shots of Soviet iconography appear; in one Tennant and Lowe appear in their costumes, walking across Red Square.

Bernstein from Spin commented on the video, "Purloining images from such fertile sources as Blade Runner, Devo, Metropolis, and the Powell and Pressburger 1946 classic Stairway to Heaven, the video is a computer-generated fantastic voyage. The at-all-times deadpan Boys march up endless white staircases and sail the skyline on silver surfboards from the West Coast to Red Square." The video received heavy rotation on MTV Europe in November 1993 and was nominated for the Grammy Award for Best Short Form Music Video in 1995, losing to "Love Is Strong" by The Rolling Stones. The "Go West" costumes were parodied in the video for their later 2006 single, "I'm with Stupid".

=== Track listings ===
- UK 7-inch and cassette single
- Australian cassette single
- Japanese mini-CD single
1. "Go West" – 5:03
2. "Shameless" – 5:04
- UK 12-inch single

A1. "Go West" (Mings Gone West: First and Second Movement) – 10:12
B1. "Go West" (Farley and Heller disco mix) – 6:01
B2. "Go West" (Kevin Saunderson Tribe mix) – 6:50

- UK and Australian CD single
1. "Go West" – 5:03
2. "Shameless" – 5:04
3. "Go West" (Ming's Gone West: First and Second Movement) – 10:12
- European maxi-CD single
1. "Go West" (edit) – 5:03
2. "Go West" (Ming's Gone West: First and Second Movement) – 10:12
3. "Go West" (Farley and Heller Fire Island mix) – 7:42
4. "Go West" (Kevin Saunderson Tribe mix) – 6:49
- US maxi-CD single
1. "Go West" (album version) – 5:01
2. "Shameless" – 5:04
3. "Go West" (Ming's Gone West: First and Second Movement) – 10:12
4. "Go West" (Farley and Heller disco mix) – 5:58
5. "Go West" (Farley and Heller Fire Island mix) – 7:42
6. "Go West" (Kevin Saunderson Tribe mix) – 6:49
7. "Go West" (Kevin Saunderson trance mix) – 6:53
- US 12-inch single

A1. "Go West" (Ming's Gone West: First and Second Movement) – 10:12
A2. "Go West" (album version) – 5:01
B1. "Go West" (Farley and Heller disco mix) – 5:58
B2. "Go West" (Kevin Saunderson Tribe mix) – 6:49

- US cassette single
1. "Go West" (radio version) – 4:09
2. "Go West" (album version) – 5:01

=== Charts ===
==== Weekly charts ====
Weekly chart performance for "Go West"
Chart (1993)	Peak position
Australia (ARIA)	10
Austria (Ö3 Austria Top 40)	2
Belgium (Ultratop 50 Flanders)	2
Canada Top Singles (RPM)	19
Canada Dance/Urban (RPM)	8
Denmark (Tracklisten)	5
Europe (Eurochart Hot 100 Singles)	2
Europe (European Hit Radio)	1
Finland (Suomen virallinen lista)	1
France (SNEP)	2
Germany (GfK)	1
Iceland (Íslenski Listinn Topp 40)	1
Ireland (IRMA)	1
Israel (Israeli Singles Chart)	1
Italy (Musica e dischi)	13
Japan (Oricon)	91
Netherlands (Dutch Top 40)	3
Netherlands (Single Top 100)	5
New Zealand (Recorded Music NZ)	13
Norway (VG-lista)	5
Peru (UPI)	4
Quebec (ADISQ)	8
Spain (AFYVE)	4
Sweden (Sverigetopplistan)	2
Switzerland (Schweizer Hitparade)	2
UK Singles (Official Charts)	2
UK Airplay (Music Week)	2
UK Club Chart (Music Week)	44
Uruguay (UPI)	8
US Bubbling Under Hot 100 (Billboard)	6
US Dance Club Songs (Billboard)	1
US Dance Singles Sales (Billboard)	25

==== Year-end charts ====
1993 year-end chart performance for "Go West"
Chart (1993)	Position
Australia (ARIA)	71
Austria (Ö3 Austria Top 40)	22
Belgium (Ultratop 50 Flanders)	25
Europe (Eurochart Hot 100 Singles)	19
Europe (European Hit Radio)	27
Germany (Media Control)	12
Iceland (Íslenski Listinn Topp 40)	16
Israel (Israeli Singles Chart)	1
Netherlands (Dutch Top 40)	23
Netherlands (Single Top 100)	51
Sweden (Topplistan)	6
UK Singles (OCC)	46
UK Airplay (Music Week)	32

1994 year-end chart performance for "Go West"
Chart (1994)	Position
Europe (Eurochart Hot 100 Singles)	55
Germany (Media Control)	70

=== Certifications ===
Certifications for "Go West"
Region	Certification	Certified units/sales
Australia (ARIA)	Gold	35,000^{^}
Austria (IFPI Austria)	Gold	25,000^{*}
Germany (BVMI)	Platinum	500,000^{^}
United Kingdom (BPI)	Silver	200,000^{‡}
^{*} Sales figures based on certification alone.^{^} Shipments figures based on certification alone.^{‡} Sales+streaming figures based on certification alone.

=== Release history ===
Release dates and formats for "Go West"
Region	Date	Format(s)	Label(s)	Ref.
United Kingdom	September 6, 1993	7-inch vinyl; 12-inch vinyl; CD; cassette	Parlophone	
Japan	September 22, 1993	Mini-CD	EMI	
Australia	October 11, 1993	CD; cassette	Parlophone	

== As a sports chant ==
Many football clubs throughout the world (primarily in Germany and England, but also Paris Saint-Germain F.C.) have created their own renditions of "Go West" to be sung by supporters on matchday. Versions observed in English include "go home to your sexy wives", “one nil to The Arsenal”, "go West Bromwich Albion" and others. Borussia Dortmund began this tradition in 1993 with their version entitled "Olé, jetzt kommt der BVB" ("Olé, here comes the BVB"), while fans of FC Schalke 04 originated the popular and influential "Steht auf, wenn ihr Schalker seid!" ("Stand Up, if you're a Schalke Fan"). Additionally, the fans of the Poland national football team and of the Poland national teams in other sports traditionally sing "Polska, biało-czerwoni" ("Poland, white and red") to the melody of the song. During 2022 FIFA World Cup, Argentina fans started chanting a variation for Ángel Di María ("Fideo lalala lala") which would later be used to cheer for all grandmothers of the country ("Abuela la lalala"). The tune had been rekindled in Argentina by a pasta commercial few years before.

Although the club's supporters did not create their own rendition of "Go West", the Village People version of the song was played at Western United FC home games after the club had victories in the A-Leagues.

Irish professional Rugby Union club Ulster Rugby sing their own supporters version entitled "Stand Up for the Ulstermen"

In 2023, another rendition of "Go West" was created. Called "Visi už Lietkabelį", it was dedicated to Lithuanian basketball club BC Lietkabelis. Since then, it has become an unofficial anthem of Lietkabelis, and is frequently sung by supporters of this club before the start of its home matches.

== In popular culture ==
The Pet Shop Boys version of the song is played in the first and last scenes of Chinese director Jia Zhangke's film Mountains May Depart (2015). In many of Jia's films, the 'turn' China has made towards 'the West' is a central theme – Mountains May Depart is no exception. Also, the song serves as a unifying element: it connects the first part of the film (set in 1999) to the final scene (set in 2025), creating a poignant effect which several critics have praised; David Rooney of the Hollywood Reporter called the ending "a beautiful concluding sequence that reaffirms the film's aching depth of feeling and extraordinary sense of place".

In 1998, Ambrosia rewrote their lyrics for an advertising jingle for an advertising campaign to promote their products - most notably their rice pudding - given their products come from the West Country.
