= I Wouldn't Normally Do This Kind of Thing =

1993 single by Pet Shop Boys

Single by Pet Shop Boys

from the album Very
- B-side: "Too Many People"; "Violence" (Haçienda version)
- Released: 29 November 1993
- Genre: Disco; synth-pop
- Length: 3:03 (album version); 4:45 (Beatmasters 7-inch mix)
- Label: Parlophone
- Songwriters: Neil Tennant; Chris Lowe
- Producer: Pet Shop Boys

Pet Shop Boys singles chronology
"Go West" (1993)	"I Wouldn't Normally Do This Kind of Thing" (1993)	"Liberation" (1994)

Music video
- "I Wouldn't Normally Do This Kind of Thing" on YouTube

"I Wouldn't Normally Do This Kind of Thing" is a song by English synth-pop duo Pet Shop Boys from their fifth studio album, Very (1993). The song, both written and produced by the duo, describes a person normally hesitant to unwind and show his feelings, who—because of some event in his life—suddenly becomes willing to loosen up. It was released in the United Kingdom on 29 November 1993 by Parlophone as the album's third single, reaching number 13 on the UK Singles Chart. In the United States, where it was released in January 1994, it reached number two on the Billboard Dance Club Play chart. The song's accompanying music video was directed by Howard Greenhalgh, featuring the duo in a Sixties-style.

== Background and composition ==
In a 1993 interview with NME, Neil Tennant described "I Wouldn't Normally Do This Kind of Thing" as having "no dark underbelly whatsoever". He commented, "It's just a happy song, it's just meant to be a love song. Actually, it is from an unusual point of view. We always get this thing where people go on about how English and reserved we are, so it's meant to be a reserved person falling in love. There's something rather middle-aged about it, like some kind of librarian falling in love and going mad."

The title phrase, "I wouldn't normally do this kind of thing", occurred to Tennant when he flew round-trip from London to Edinburgh in one day to view a James Pryde painting at the National Gallery of Scotland. The imagery of someone spontaneously dancing to The Rite of Spring was inspired by the cartoons of Jules Feiffer. Tennant and Chris Lowe wrote a demo of the song the day after his trip. Stephen Hague did additional production on the track and added a guitar riff to the piano intro for the album version.

== Release ==
The song was extensively remixed by the Beatmasters for release as a single. They added brass and string parts and expanded the guitar riff in the intro, giving the song a more Sixties sound. Tennant stated that at the time, he preferred the Beatmasters version but has since come to appreciate the album version. The duo played the song with the new intro on their 2013–2015 Electric Tour and included a version of the song with it on their 2003 PopArt: The Hits compilation.

The single release was bolstered by a large amount of bonus material available across a wide range of formats. Multiple remixes of the song were commissioned, including a set by DJ Pierre. The main B-side is "Too Many People", but the single also featured new versions of two tracks from the 1986 album Please: "West End Girls" remixed by Sasha and "Violence" reworked by the duo for a performance at The Haçienda in Manchester in 1992.

=== Artwork and packaging ===
As with the previous singles from Very, the duo donned new outfits for the promotional campaign. Lowe wore a blonde wig with a pink and white costume, while Tennant was dressed in pink and black clothing with a brunette wig. The CD2 single (pictured) featured Tennant with repeated images of Lowe dancing around him, and CD1 had the reverse with Lowe in the center surrounded by dancing Tennants. In the UK, CD2 came in a rubber sleeve that could hold both CD singles. This was similar to the packaging for Very Relentless.

== Critical reception ==
Larry Flick from Billboard magazine wrote, "PSB's lauded Very project spawns another club winner as they combine their patented pop/disco electro-grooves with sharp, clever lyrics. The hook is quite memorable, while a plethora of trance-ish remixes is right in the pocket of current dance trends. Lively album version also is a total joy, and deserves more than a just cursory push from EMI's pop promotion department." Dave Sholin from the Gavin Report said, "It's impossible to hear Chris Lowe and Neil Tennant's trademark sound and not believe this pair has great fun making their music."

In his weekly UK chart commentary, James Masterton praised the track, stating that the duo "have picked the other standout track" from the album after "Go West", adding that it "is far and away the happiest, most barking mad pop single they have released in their seven year career and is all the better for it." He concluded, "Alright, so I like it, but it deserves to be big." Alan Jones from Music Week gave it a score of four out of five, naming it one of the "standout tracks" of the album. He felt that it "is tweaked into even better shape by the Beatmasters and DJ Pierre, and judging from the artwork, the video should be a hoot." He also complimented it as "one of the hottest records of the winter." James Hamilton from the Record Mirror Dance Update described it as "swirling pure disco".

Jim Arundel of Melody Maker considered the song to be another of the duo's "cinemascopic frug anthems". He considered it to be "as cheesy and boisterous as a good night out in Staines" and added that the Beatmasters' 7-inch mix was "bouncier than the LP version". Barbara Ellen of NME picked it as a "single of the week" and called it "another triumph". Jonathan Bernstein from Spin commented, "I feel like taking all my clothes off dancing to the rite of spring, exults Neil Tennant on "I Wouldn't Normally Do This Kind of Thing", and you know he ain't giving a shout-out to the Dischord noisemakers."

== Music video ==
A music video was produced to promote the single, directed by British director Howard Greenhalgh. It featured Tennant and Lowe, dressed in the same Sixties-style wigs and costumes as on the cover art. The computer-generated background of black-and-white tunnels and vortexes was inspired by the op art of Bridget Riley and Sega computer games. The duo use joysticks to control avatars of themselves dancing and kickboxing. Another dancer takes his clothes off, in accordance with the lyrics. Dave Sholin from the Gavin Report remarked that the video "recalls the days when Twiggy set fashion trends." It was A-listed on Germany's VIVA in March 1994.

== Live performances ==
Pet Shop Boys performed "I Wouldn't Normally Do This Kind of Thing" on the Discovery Tour in 1994, wearing the wigs from the music video. On the Electric Tour (2013–15), the song was preceded by an excerpt from The Rite of Spring by Igor Stravinsky, referenced in the lyrics.

== Track listings ==
- UK 7-inch and cassette single, Australasian cassette single
1. "I Wouldn't Normally Do This Kind of Thing" – 4:45
2. "Too Many People" – 4:19
- UK 12-inch single

A1. "I Wouldn't Normally Do This Kind of Thing" (extended nude mix) – 7:49
A2. "I Wouldn't Normally Do This Kind of Thing" (Grandballroom dub) – 6:32
B1. "West End Girls" (Sasha remix) – 7:45
B2. "West End Girls" (Sasha dub) – 8:16

- UK 12-inch single (DJ Pierre remixes)

A1. "I Wouldn't Normally Do This Kind of Thing" (DJ Pierre Wild Pitch mix) – 8:22
A2. "I Wouldn't Normally Do This Kind of Thing" (DJ Pierre Wild Tribal Beats) – 3:49
B1. "I Wouldn't Normally Do This Kind of Thing" (DJ Pierre club mix) – 7:10
B2. "I Wouldn't Normally Do This Kind of Thing" (DJ Pierre Wild Pitch dub) – 7:45

- UK CD1
1. "I Wouldn't Normally Do This Kind of Thing" – 4:45
2. "I Wouldn't Normally Do This Kind of Thing" (extended nude mix) – 7:49
3. "I Wouldn't Normally Do This Kind of Thing" (Wild Pitch mix) – 8:22
4. "I Wouldn't Normally Do This Kind of Thing" (Grandballroom mix) – 6:39
5. "I Wouldn't Normally Do This Kind of Thing" (Wild Pitch dub) – 7:45
- UK CD2 and Australasian CD single
1. "I Wouldn't Normally Do This Kind of Thing" – 3:04
2. "Too Many People" – 4:19
3. "Violence" (Haçienda version) – 4:58
4. "West End Girls" (Sasha remix) – 7:45
- European CD single
1. "I Wouldn't Normally Do This Kind of Thing" – 3:04
2. "West End Girls" (Sasha remix) – 7:45
- US maxi-CD single
1. "I Wouldn't Normally Do This Kind of Thing" (album version) – 3:04
2. "I Wouldn't Normally Do This Kind of Thing" (club mix) – 7:10
3. "I Wouldn't Normally Do This Kind of Thing" (Wild Pitch mix) – 8:22
4. "I Wouldn't Normally Do This Kind of Thing" (extended nude mix) – 7:48
5. "West End Girls" (Sasha mix) – 7:45
6. "Violence" (Haçienda version) – 4:58
7. "Too Many People" – 4:19
- US 12-inch single

A1. "I Wouldn't Normally Do This Kind of Thing" (club mix) – 7:10
A2. "I Wouldn't Normally Do This Kind of Thing" (Grand Ballroom dub) – 6:30
A3. "I Wouldn't Normally Do This Kind of Thing" (album version) – 3:04
B1. "I Wouldn't Normally Do This Kind of Thing" (extended nude mix) – 7:48
B2. "West End Girls" (Sasha mix) – 7:45
- The label lists the Grand Ballroom dub but instead has the Grand Ballroom mix

- US cassette single
1. "I Wouldn't Normally Do This Kind of Thing" (album version) – 3:04
2. "I Wouldn't Normally Do This Kind of Thing" (7-inch mix) – 4:45

== Personnel ==
Personnel are adapted from the liner notes of Very: Further Listening 1992–1994 and "I Wouldn't Normally Do This Kind of Thing".

Pet Shop Boys

- Chris Lowe
- Neil Tennant

Technical personnel

- Pet Shop Boys – production
- Stephen Hague – additional production, mixing (album version)
- Mike "Spike" Drake – mixing (album version), mix engineering (single version)
- Bob Kraushaar – engineering (album version)
- Pete Gleadall – engineering (album version)
- Beatmasters – remix, additional production (single version)

Artwork

- Farrow/PSB – design
- Andy Earle – photography
- David Fielding – costume design

== Charts ==
=== Weekly charts ===
Weekly chart performance for "I Wouldn't Normally Do This Kind of Thing"
Chart (1993–1994)	Peak position
Australia (ARIA)	34
Austria (Ö3 Austria Top 40)	18
Belgium (Ultratop 50 Flanders)	24
Canada Top Singles (RPM)	61
Europe (Eurochart Hot 100 Singles)	27
Europe (European AC Radio)	8
Europe (European Hit Radio)	4
Finland (Suomen virallinen lista)	4
Germany (GfK)	37
Iceland (Íslenski Listinn Topp 40)	16
Ireland (IRMA)	20
Netherlands (Dutch Top 40 Tipparade)	2
Netherlands (Single Top 100)	45
Quebec (ADISQ)	23
Sweden (Sverigetopplistan)	38
Switzerland (Schweizer Hitparade)	26
UK Singles (Official Charts)	13
UK Airplay (Music Week)	1
UK Dance (Music Week)	13
UK Dance (Music Week) Remix	7
UK Club Chart (Music Week)	14
US Dance Club Songs (Billboard)	2
US Dance Singles Sales (Billboard)	36

=== Year-end charts ===
Year-end chart performance for "I Wouldn't Normally Do This Kind of Thing"
Chart (1994)	Position
Europe (European Hit Radio)	40
US Dance Club Play (Billboard)	8

== Release history ==
Release dates and formats for "I Wouldn't Normally Do This Kind of Thing"
Region	Date	Format(s)	Label(s)	Ref.
United Kingdom	29 November 1993	7-inch vinyl; CD1; cassette	Parlophone	
United Kingdom	6 December 1993	CD2	Parlophone	
United Kingdom	29 December 1993	12-inch vinyl	Parlophone	
Australia	24 January 1994	CD; cassette	Parlophone	
Japan	9 February 1994	Mini-CD	EMI	
