= Richard Niles =

- Born: May 28, 1951 (age 75); Hollywood, California, U.S.
- Genres: Jazz; pop; classical
- Occupations: Musician; composer; arranger; record producer; journalist
- Instrument: Guitar
- Years active: 1975–present
- Website: richardniles.com

Richard Niles is an American composer, arranger, record producer, guitarist, broadcaster, and journalist.

== Biography ==
=== Early years ===
Born May 28, 1951, in Hollywood, NIles is a composer, singer, and guitarist who writes films, books, and plays, and lectures in screenwriting. He is the son of Tony Romano, a jazz guitarist who worked with Bing Crosby, Ray Heindorf, Bob Hope, Cole Porter, Pat Silver-Lasky, Frank Sinatra, and Joe Venuti. His parents divorced in 1959, and three years later the 8-year-old Niles moved with his mother to London. He grew up in the care of his mother and stepfather, Jesse Lasky Jr., a poet, playwright and screenwriter. Niles toured Britain with his group Pure Wings (1969–1970) and then decided to study. According to Niles in an interview with HitQuarters, although his parents were critical about his choice to become a musician, they eventually supported his studies. In 1975 he received a degree in composition from the Berklee College of Music in Boston where he studied with Gary Burton, Michael Gibbs, Pat Metheny, and Herb Pomeroy. He received his Ph.D. from Brunel University in 2008.

=== Career ===
Returning to London in 1975, he signed to Essex Records as a writer, becoming staff arranger and producer of songwriter demos for Essex and EMI Music. This indirectly led to becoming musical director and arranger for Cat Stevens. On British television series for David Essex and Leo Sayer he arranged and conducted for Ronnie Spector, Twiggy, Kate Bush, and Denny Laine. In 1978 as staff arranger for Hansa Records he discovered Sarah Brightman and arranged both his and her first hit, "I Lost My Heart to a Starship Trooper". He has composed, arranged and produced music for Anita Baker, Cilla Black, James Brown, Ray Charles, Cher, Petula Clark, Randy Crawford, Gloria Gaynor, Lulu, Paul McCartney, Pet Shop Boys, Tears For Fears, Tina Turner, and Deniece Williams. He arranged the Grace Jones album Slave to the Rhythm.

Niles also scored and conducted strings on Depeche Mode songs "Home", "Only When I Lose Myself" and "Surrender" and for Berlin's "Sex Me Talk Me". He wrote arrangements for Pet Shop Boys, Swing Out Sister, Living in a Box, Frankie Goes to Hollywood, ABC, and Was (Not Was). He has worked with Cliff Richard, Barry Manilow, Ray Charles, Stephen Gately, Ronan Keating, and contributed to hits for Wet Wet Wet, Damage, O-Town, OTT, Take That, Boyzone, and Westlife, including their duet "Against All Odds" with Mariah Carey.

He appeared as the leader of the house band, Bandzilla, in Ruby Wax's Channel 4 television series Don't Miss Wax. Bandzilla released an album of big band instrumentals. Bandzilla was the house band for the Michael Ball television series (1994) with Niles as musical director. Niles wrote and arranged for both Joe Cocker and James Brown on this series. As leader of Bandzilla, he released Blue Movies featuring Guy Barker and John Thirkell (Lifetime Records, 1990) and Bandzilla Rises!!! (Bandzilla Records, 2016) co-produced by John Thirkell and featuring Randy Brecker, Leo Sayer, Clarice Assad, Lamont Dozier Jr. and Nigel Hitchcock.

Niles wrote, arranged, and produced music for Pat Metheny, Bob Mintzer, John Patitucci, Jane Monheit and Bob James. Other jazz-oriented work produced by Niles include albums by Morrissey–Mullen and Jim Mullen. Niles released the albums Santa Rita (Sanctuary) and Club Deranged (Nucool).

Niles discovered British R&B singer Clive Griffin producing and co-writing the album Clive Griffin in 1987 followed by TV appearances and concerts supporting Chaka Khan.

In 1999, Niles discovered the Norwegian singer/songwriter Silje Nergaard, producing and co-writing three albums, Tell Me Where You're Going (EMI/Lifetime Records 1990), Cow On The Highway (Toshiba/EMI 1991) and Silje (Toshiba/EMI 1992). Their song "Tell Me Where You're Going" (b/w a duet of the same song with Pat Metheny) was Number 1 in Japan on the J-Wave charts.

In 2012, Niles moved to Southern California where he opened his studio and production/publishing company Niles Smiles Music.

Niles arranged two albums for the British singer Paul Carrack; Rain Or Shine (2013) and Soul Shadows (2015).

In 2015, Niles became a member/arranger of The Wrecking Crew All Stars led by Don Peake, performing twice at Catalina's Jazz Club in Hollywood.

Niles has also worked for the advertising industry, composing and producing music for TV commercials including McDonald's, Max Factor, Toshiba, Wall's, Nescafé and EuroDisney.

Niles has written books on music. The Pat Metheny Interviews (Pub. Hal Leonard 2009), Polymetrics with Gary O'Toole (Pub. Jazzsense 2011), The Invisible Artist (pub. Amazon Create Space 2014) and From Dreaming To Gigging - Jazz Guitar in 6 Months (Pub. Amazon Create Space 2015).

As a journalist, Niles has been a regular contributor to Making Music since 1994. His radio career began presenting Jazz Notes and Adventures in Jazz on BBC Radio 3 in 1996. Since 1998 he wrote and presented his own BBC Radio 2 program New Jazz Standards, which The Guardian says has "changed the tenor of jazz broadcasting." Niles has since written and presented several BBC Radio 2 documentaries including "The Arrangers" and "Bright Size Life – Pat Metheny".

Niles has taught and given masterclasses in the UK at Brunel University, Leeds College of Music, The Royal Northern College of Music, The Academy of Contemporary Music, The Institute of Contemporary Music and The Tech Schools of Music. In the US he has taught at USC, UCLA, CalState (Northridge), Berklee College Of Music, and the Orange County School of Arts.

Niles wrote the score to The Strike (Comic Strip Films 1988) (Golden Rose of Montreaux, Honorable Mention for music), Do The Right Thing (Universal Pictures 1989), Billy Elliot (orchestration – BBC Films 2000), The Christmas Carol: The Movie (lyrics – MGM 2001), Alice in Russialand (dir. Ken Russell 1995)

== Personal life ==
In 1982, Niles was married to vocalist Tessa Niles; they divorced in 1988. He married Aylin Marquez in 1999 and they have one child, Alexander, born in 2002. Alexander is a musician and actor performing in Francis Ford Coppola's Distant Vision.

== Bibliography ==
Articles in Berklee Today magazine

- "Inside and Outside the Harmony of Pat Metheny" (2011)
- "Attitude versus Altitude" (2013)
- "Saving the Music Business" (2014)
- "The Significance of the 'Blurred Lines' Lawsuit" (Summer 2015)
- "Be the Change... Instead of Playing the Changes" (The Score, Winter 2013)

Articles by Richard Niles in Making Music magazine:

- "Alto Image" – Nigel Hitchcock (May 1994)
- "James Brown" – Interview (July 1994)
- "Let's Come to an Arrangement" (July 1994)
- "So You Want to Be a Star?" (October 1994)
- "So You Want to Be a Session Musician?" (January 1995)
- "The Production Line" (April 1995)
- "Drum Hum" – Danny Gottlieb (May 1995)
- "Tape Monitor" – Engineering (July 1995)
- "Bebop to Hip–Hop" – Branford Marsalis (September 1995
- "What is a Musician Anyway?" (June 1996)
- "Air" – Wayne Shorter Interview (October 1997)
- "Don't Get Mad..." (May 1999)
- "Are You Getting Ripped Off?" (August 1999)

Articles about Richard Niles:

- "Richard Niles – The Producer" by Chas De Whalley, Musician & Recording World (October 1987)
- "England's Jazz Crusader" by Mark Small, Berklee Today (Spring 2000)
- "Richard Niles – The Professional Touch" by Mike Senior, Sound On Sound (June 2000)
- La Porta Classica – Richard Niles El Procés de Composició de la Banda Sonora – Roger Juliá Satorra (2004)
- Producer Crosstalk – "Richard Niles" by Rob Putnam, Music Connection (January 2010)

Guitar International (Nov 2009)
