= Can You Forgive Her? (song) =

1993 single by Pet Shop Boys

Single by Pet Shop Boys

from the album Very
- B-side: "Hey, Headmaster"; "What Keeps Mankind Alive?"
- Released: 1 June 1993
- Genre: Disco; trance; techno; synth-pop
- Length: 3:53
- Label: Parlophone
- Songwriters: Neil Tennant; Chris Lowe
- Producer: Pet Shop Boys

Pet Shop Boys singles chronology
"Was It Worth It?" (1991)	"Can You Forgive Her?" (1993)	"Go West" (1993)

Music video
- "Can You Forgive Her?" on YouTube

"Can You Forgive Her?" is a song by English synth-pop duo Pet Shop Boys, released as the first single from their fifth studio album, Very (1993). The lyrics describe in the second person a young man's humiliation when his girlfriend accuses him of still being in love with a childhood friend; the woman is "not prepared to share you with a memory", and is "going to go and get herself a real man instead". The title of the song derives from the Anthony Trollope novel of the same name.

Parlophone released "Can You Forgive Her?" on 1 June 1993 as the lead single from Very, and it became the duo's 13th top-10 single on the UK Singles Chart, debuting and peaking at number seven. Despite failing to enter the US Billboard Hot 100, it became a number-one single on the Billboard Dance Club Play chart. The song reached the top 10 in Denmark, Finland, Italy and Sweden. Its accompanying music video was directed by Howard Greenhalgh and filmed in London.

== Background and composition ==
Chris Lowe wrote the music in 6/8 time as a change from the standard 4/4 time signature. Neil Tennant used the title of a book he had recently read—Can You Forgive Her? by Anthony Trollope—as a starting point for the lyrics. According to Tennant, the song tells a humorous story of a man considering whether to forgive his girlfriend for taunting him about his "evident homosexual longing", as he recalls his first time having sex with a boy he was in love with at school.

In a 1993 interview with NME, Tennant described "Can You Forgive Her?" as being about "humiliation". He added, "It's also about someone not facing up to something about themselves, about sexuality. There's the bit about the cricket pavilion and the bicycle shed, thinking back to first sexual experiences. I actually think it's a bit Soft Cell-ish that bit, it's a bit pervy. The [rock music] line gives the idea that the girl sees the guy as a closet queen, and she thinks that if he dances to disco he's not really a man and he hasn't faced up to this."

== Release ==
Five different versions of the single were released on 1 June 1993 in the UK. The 7-inch vinyl, cassette, and CD1 singles included the B-side "Hey, Headmaster", a song written by Tennant in 1979, prior to the formation of Pet Shop Boys. The 12-inch vinyl featured remixes of "Can You Forgive Her?" by MK and Rollo. On the CD2 single, Johnny Marr remixed "I Want to Wake Up" from Actually (1987), and Pet Shop Boys covered "What Keeps Mankind Alive?" in a recording from 1988 for a BBC Radio programme celebrating the 60th anniversary of Bertolt Brecht and Kurt Weill's musical The Threepenny Opera.

=== Marketing and design ===
In marketing for the single, Pet Shop Boys adopted a costume involving orange overalls and extremely tall pointy hats. The hats resembled dunce caps in reference to the schooldays described in the lyrics. The costumes were created by David Fielding, who had designed the 1991 Performance Tour. The duo decided to wear elaborate costumes, as they had done on tour, as a change from the naturalistic look for their previous albums, as well as in reaction to the grunge style that had become popular at the time. Recent video games, such as Sonic the Hedgehog which Lowe enjoyed, also influenced the otherworldly aesthetic.

Fielding created a scenario in which the costumed duo were aliens who came from a large blue egg.

I wanted to create a metaphor about being born and being brought up in what seems like an alien landscape on the earth, and looking out beyond, looking at the heavens, and thinking "why are we here?" Chris will have a telescope for looking at the stars… There are images connected with school games, an element in the song, which is all about growing up at school and finding one's true sexuality during that period of development behind the bicycle sheds or cricket pavilions…

This imagery was used on a Top of the Pops performance on 10 June 1993, in which Lowe emerged from behind the blue egg with his telescope and Tennant was sitting on a high umpire's chair. The duo were joined by dancers wielding cricket bats.

Promotional photos of Tennant and Lowe in costume were taken by Chris Nash. One was used on the cover of the 12-inch single, which was released last, but the costumes were not ready in time for the initial release. Instead, small models of the duo in costume, created by Fielding, were photographed by Marcus Leith for the single covers. The typography, with the letters crowded together, was influenced by Ray Gun magazine and was chosen as a departure from the frequently used Helvetica typeface, according to designer Mark Farrow.

=== Music video ===
The music video, directed by Howard Greenhalgh, depicted the duo wearing their costumes while wandering in a surreal, partly computer-generated environment, with blue egg shapes and emus. Live action shots were filmed in a number of either well known or futuristic locations around London. They are shown at the top of The Monument in the City of London. They cross London Bridge in the rush hour crowd and also walk over the footbridge at Poplar station on the Docklands Light Railway. The park scenes were filmed in Battersea Park and one shot shows them standing in one of the remaining sculptures from the 1951 Festival of Britain fun fair.

The music video received heavy rotation on MTV Europe.

== Critical reception ==
Stephen Thomas Erlewine from AllMusic described the song as "quietly shocking". Larry Flick from Billboard magazine wrote that the first peek into PSB's new set, Very, "shows 'em hanging on the cutting edge of the trance/rave movement—a logical progression from their synth/pop salad days. Neil Tennant's distinctive "chat" singing is still oozing with deadpan charm, and partner Chris Lowe's penchant for quirky keyboard effects also remains intact." James Muretich from Calgary Herald said they "still sound like disco aristocrats" on songs like "Can You Forgive Her?". The Daily Vault's Michael R. Smith felt it "make a strong impression right from the start". Caroline Sullivan from The Guardian commented, "As ever, it takes several listens for it to resolve itself into a distinctive tune; when it finally does, it's pretty wonderful. Juicy lyric too, something about being rejected by a girl who preferred 'a real man'." Peter Paphides, writing for Melody Maker, picked "Can You Forgive Her?" as one of the magazine's "Singles of the Week" and noted the "orchestral flourishes", "colossal John Barry brush strokes" and Tennant's "refined vocals". He added that the song, after a few listens, "slowly but surely starts swamping the senses like a hot headrush".

Alan Jones from Music Week named it Single of the Week, writing, "Typical sweeping orchestral stabs usher in the first Pet Shop Boys single in 18 months. "Can You Forgive Her?" is, equally typically, a highly mainstream and instant song, with oft-repeated and cheery chorus offsetting the usual mournful vocal from Neil Tennant." He added, "An obvious biggie." Ian McCann of NME was less positive in his review. He commented how the duo "raid the Proteus strings module and the bombast sampler" and considered the lyrics to be a "big, smudgy moan". He added that the B-side, "Hey, Headmaster", "suggests that the Petsies are going through a 'God we're getting old' nostalgia phase". A reviewer from People Magazine stated, "With his clipped "pass the Grey Poupon" elocution, Tennant talks/sings his way through a mid-tempo dance track about a man torn between his female lover and his closeted desire for a man."

James Hamilton from the Record Mirror Dance Update described it as a "bouncy thumping strong "disco" anthem" in his weekly dance column. Stuart Maconie from Select named it "a brash and blowsy show-stopper with a heart of pure trauma — of a man struggling with his incipient gayness and a vindictive girlfriend." Siân Pattenden from Smash Hits gave "Can You Forgive Her?" a score of three out of five, saying, "Very apt. It seemed they might be relegated to documentaries about pop music but nay - it is a majestic carnival of a return to Popsville, where Neil actually sings." Charles Aaron from Spin wrote, "Spine-tingling, techno-squishy pop-opera, with the year's most appropriate libretto: "She's made you some kind of laughing stock / Because you dance to disco and don't like rock"." Another Spin editor, Jonathan Bernstein declared it as "spiteful" and "a thunderous stomp charting the decline of a relationship with an equal balance of power ("She made fun of you and even in bed / Said she was gonna go and get herself a real man instead")."

In 1999, Tom Ewing of Freaky Trigger ranked it at number 22 in his list of the "Top 100 Singles of the 90s". Ewing called it "probably the only top ten pop hit about not wanting to admit to yourself that you're gay", which he said "demonstrates what an unexpected and wonderful arena the charts can be. It went top ten because it's so catchy and so relentless. Every grand orchestral stab is an accusation, a slap in the face; every lull a threat, and the band’s disco throb has never been so unforgiving. Tennant plays up to this – his voice slips easily from taunting not-quite-sympathy to a tone of pitiless reprimand: I think most consciences sound like this."

== Track listings ==
- UK 7-inch and cassette single
- Australian and Canadian cassette single
1. "Can You Forgive Her?" – 3:54
2. "Hey, Headmaster" – 3:06
- UK 12-inch single

A1. "Can You Forgive Her?" (Rollo remix) – 6:00
A2. "Can You Forgive Her?" (Rollo dub) – 4:51
B1. "Can You Forgive Her?" (MK remix) – 7:26
B2. "Can You Forgive Her?" (MK dub) – 5:53

- UK and Australian CD1
1. "Can You Forgive Her?" – 3:54
2. "Hey, Headmaster" – 3:06
3. "Can You Forgive Her?" (Rollo remix)
4. "Can You Forgive Her?" (Rollo dub)
- UK and Australian CD2; Canadian CD single
1. "Can You Forgive Her?" (MK remix) – 7:26
2. "I Want to Wake Up" (1993 remix) – 5:25
3. "What Keeps Mankind Alive?" – 3:25
4. "Can You Forgive Her?" (MK dub) – 5:53
- US maxi-CD single
1. "Can You Forgive Her?" – 3:54
2. "Can You Forgive Her?" (Rollo remix) – 6:00
3. "Can You Forgive Her?" (Rollo dub) – 4:51
4. "Can You Forgive Her?" (MK remix) – 7:28
5. "Can You Forgive Her?" (MK dub) – 5:53
6. "I Want to Wake Up" (1993 remix) – 5:25
- US 12-inch and maxi-cassette single

A1. "Can You Forgive Her?" (Rollo remix) – 6:00
A2. "Can You Forgive Her?" (Rollo dub) – 4:51
A3. "Can You Forgive Her?" – 3:54
B1. "Can You Forgive Her?" (MK remix) – 7:28
B2. "Can You Forgive Her?" (MK dub) – 5:53

- US cassette single

A. "Can You Forgive Her?" (album version) – 3:54
B. "Can You Forgive Her?" (MK remix edit) – 4:00

== Personnel ==
Personnel are adapted from the liner notes of the single "Can You Forgive Her?".

Pet Shop Boys

- Chris Lowe
- Neil Tennant

Technical personnel

- Pet Shop Boys – production
- Stephen Hague – additional production, mixing
- Mike "Spike" Drake – mixing
- Bob Kraushaar – engineering
- Pete Gleadall – engineering, programming

Artwork

- Farrow/PSB – design
- David Fielding – models
- Marcus Leith – photography
- Chris Nash – photography (12-inch single)

== Charts ==
=== Weekly charts ===
Weekly chart performance for "Can You Forgive Her?"
Chart (1993)	Peak position
Australia (ARIA)	17
Austria (Ö3 Austria Top 40)	18
Belgium (Ultratop 50 Flanders)	21
Canada Retail Singles (The Record)	6
Canada Top Singles (RPM)	37
Canada Dance/Urban (RPM)	4
Denmark (Tracklisten)	6
Europe (Eurochart Hot 100 Singles)	14
Europe (European Hit Radio)	3
Finland (Suomen virallinen lista)	2
Germany (GfK)	17
Iceland (Íslenski Listinn Topp 40)	12
Ireland (IRMA)	13
Israel (Israeli Singles Chart)	1
Italy (Musica e dischi)	8
Netherlands (Dutch Top 40)	28
Netherlands (Single Top 100)	29
New Zealand (Recorded Music NZ)	46
Quebec (ADISQ)	22
Spain (AFYVE)	17
Sweden (Sverigetopplistan)	9
Switzerland (Schweizer Hitparade)	19
UK Singles (Official Charts)	7
UK Airplay (Music Week)	2
UK Dance (Music Week)	11
UK Club Chart (Music Week)	21
US Bubbling Under Hot 100 (Billboard)	9
US Alternative Airplay (Billboard)	10
US Dance Club Songs (Billboard)	1
US Dance Singles Sales (Billboard)	31

=== Year-end charts ===
Year-end chart performance for "Can You Forgive Her?"
Chart (1993)	Position
Australia (ARIA)	92
Canada Dance/Urban (RPM)	17
Europe (Eurochart Hot 100 Singles)	82
Europe (European Hit Radio)	29
Germany (Media Control)	78
Israel (Israeli Singles Chart)	10
Sweden (Topplistan)	75
UK Singles (OCC)	97
UK Airplay (Music Week)	45
US Dance Club Play (Billboard)	43

== Release history ==
Release dates and formats for "Can You Forgive Her?"
Region	Date	Format(s)	Label(s)	Ref(s).
United Kingdom	1 June 1993	7-inch vinyl; CD1; cassette	Parlophone	
United Kingdom	7 June 1993	CD2	Parlophone	
United Kingdom	28 June 1993	12-inch vinyl	Parlophone	
Australia	5 July 1993	CD1; cassette	Parlophone; EMI	
Australia	26 July 1993	CD2	Parlophone; EMI	

== Cover version ==
In 2011, the Finnish folk metal band Finntroll released a cover version of "Can You Forgive Her?".
