= Inner Sanctum (album) =

Live album by Pet Shop Boys
- Released: 12 April 2019
- Recorded: July 2018
- Venue: Royal Opera House, London
- Length: 103:00
- Label: x2
- Director: David Barnard

Pet Shop Boys chronology
Agenda (2019)	Inner Sanctum (2019)	Hotspot (2020)

Inner Sanctum is the third live album and video by English duo Pet Shop Boys, released on 12 April 2019 by the duo's label x2. It was recorded in July 2018 during the band's four-day Inner Sanctum residency at the Royal Opera House in London as part of the Super Tour. The show was designed by Es Devlin and directed by David Barnard, and released on DVD, Blu-ray and CD. The DVD/Blu-ray and CD release also includes a recording of the duo playing at Rock in Rio on 17 September 2017.

== Track listing ==
Inner Sanctum track listing
No.	Title	Length
1.	"Inner Sanctum"	4:35
2.	"Opportunities (Let's Make Lots of Money)"	2:51
3.	"The Pop Kids / In the Night / Burn"	11:11
4.	"Love Is a Bourgeois Construct"	6:43
5.	"New York City Boy"	3:40
6.	"Se a vida é (That's the Way Life Is)"	4:16
7.	"Love Comes Quickly"	5:38
8.	"Love Etc."	3:48
9.	"The Dictator Decides / Inside a Dream"	9:20
10.	"West End Girls"	5:10
11.	"Home and Dry / The Enigma"	7:38
12.	"Vocal / The Sodom and Gomorrah Show"	8:56
13.	"It's a Sin"	5:43
14.	"Left to My Own Devices"	5:25
15.	"Heart / Go West"	7:59
16.	"Domino Dancing"	4:52
17.	"Always on My Mind"	4:16
18.	"The Pop Kids (Reprise)"	1:45

== Personnel ==
Pet Shop Boys

- Neil Tennant
- Chris Lowe

Guest musicians

- Christina Hizon – keyboards, violin and vocals
- Simon Tellier – electronic drums, keyboards and vocals
- Afrika Green – electronic drums and vocals
- Pete Gleadall – musical director and programming

== Charts ==
Chart performance for Inner Sanctum
Chart (2019)	Peak position
Belgian Albums (Ultratop Flanders)	127
Belgian Albums (Ultratop Wallonia)	182
Dutch Albums (Album Top 100)	91
German Albums (Offizielle Top 100)	11
Spanish Albums (PROMUSICAE)	12
Swiss Albums (Schweizer Hitparade)	2,
UK Music Video (OCC)	1
