= Super Tour =

2016–19 concert tour by Pet Shop Boys

- Tour by Pet Shop Boys
- Poster to the concert in Amsterdam
- Location: Europe; North America; South America; Middle East; Asia
- Associated album: Super
- Start date: 20 July 2016
- End date: 2 April 2019
- Legs: 6

Pet Shop Boys concert chronology
- Electric Tour (2013–15); Super Tour (2016–19); Dreamworld: The Greatest Hits Live (2022–26)

The Super Tour was a worldwide concert tour by English synth-pop duo Pet Shop Boys in support of their thirteenth studio album Super (2016). It began with a four-night residency entitled Inner Sanctum at the Royal Opera House in London in July 2016. A repeat performance of the residency in July 2018 was recorded for the live album and concert film, Inner Sanctum (2019). The tour visited North America, South America, Europe, and Asia from 2016 to 2019.

== Background and itinerary ==
=== 2016 ===
In January 2016, Pet Shop Boys announced their album, Super, along with the first concert dates at the Royal Opera House in July, which sold out. The first leg of the Super Tour kicked off on 13 October 2016 in Santiago, Chile. At their next stop in Buenos Aires, Pet Shop Boys were a highlight of the BUE Festival, according to the news channel Todo Noticias, turning Tecnópolis into a disco as the closing act.

Heading to North America, they played Las Vegas on 21 October and toured the western United States and Canada before moving east across the continent, finishing in Miami Beach on 16 November. They next appeared at Corona Capital in Mexico City, where Consequence of Sound rated the performance one of the festival's ten best. A series of dates in Europe in late November and early December closed out the year.

=== 2017 ===
The first UK dates of the Super Tour outside London took place in February 2017 in Leeds, Manchester, Glasgow, Edinburgh, Birmingham, and Bournemouth. Due to popular demand, two additional dates were added in Blackpool and Nottingham in June. A show at the Olympia in Paris was cancelled because the lasers which were an integral part of the performance could not be used indoors, according to French law.

In June, Pet Shop Boys performed at Tel Aviv Pride in Israel. They headlined Bergenfest in Norway and visited the Tinderbox Festival in Denmark. Six stops in Germany spanned June and July. Other venues included the historic Royal Theater Carré in Amsterdam and the Dalhalla open-air theatre in a quarry in Sweden.

July and August dates featured a number of festivals. A headline appearance at the 51st Montreux Jazz Festival was described as a grandiloquent show from the electro dandies by Radio Télévision Suisse. The Oxford Mail called the Henley Festival on the River Thames, with its black tie dress code, "a good fit for the dapper duo". In Spain, Pet Shop Boys appeared at the Cruïlla Barcelona Summer Festival and the Universal Music Festival to commemorate the bicentennial of the Teatro Real in Madrid. Other festivals included the Tall Ships Races Music Festival in Finland, the Storsjöyran Festival in Sweden, the Lucca Summer Festival in Italy, Jazine Open Air in Croatia, and the Brussels Summer Festival in Belgium.

Pet Shop Boys headlined the Brighton Pride Summer of Love Festival in August. In September, the tour visited Gateshead, in Neil Tennant's native Tyneside, and Dublin, Ireland, with second dates added for each after the first sold out. They wrapped up their European dates with a set at Bestival in Dorset, England.

The Super Tour returned to South America in September and October. Their performance at the Rock in Rio festival is included on Inner Sanctum. They played four additional dates in Brazil, followed by a show in Lima, Peru, and two in Mexico. The last stop of the tour for 2017 was a headline appearance at the Breakfest Festival in Medellin, Colombia.

=== 2018 ===
In addition to the reprise of the Royal Opera House residency that was filmed for Inner Sanctum, there were several Super Tour dates in the summer of 2018. Five years after a successful appearance at the Õllesummer during the Electric Tour, Pet Shop Boys headlined the festival on 6 July. At Törebodafestivalen in Sweden, Pet Shop Boys were the biggest band to have played there, both in terms of status and the setup of their show. The tour next headed to Spain for the Starlite Festival in Marbella and the Festival Internacional de Benicàssim.

In early August, Pet Shop Boys played two dates in one week in Finland, at Helsinki Ice Hall and the Wasa Open Air festival. The last Super Tour show of the summer was at the SZIN Festival in Hungary.

=== 2019 ===
The final leg of the Super Tour was a trip to Asia in late March and early April 2019, with stops in Singapore, Hong Kong, Tokyo, and Osaka. Pet Shop Boys cancelled a scheduled show in Bangkok, citing "circumstances beyond our control".

== Production ==
=== Set and lighting ===
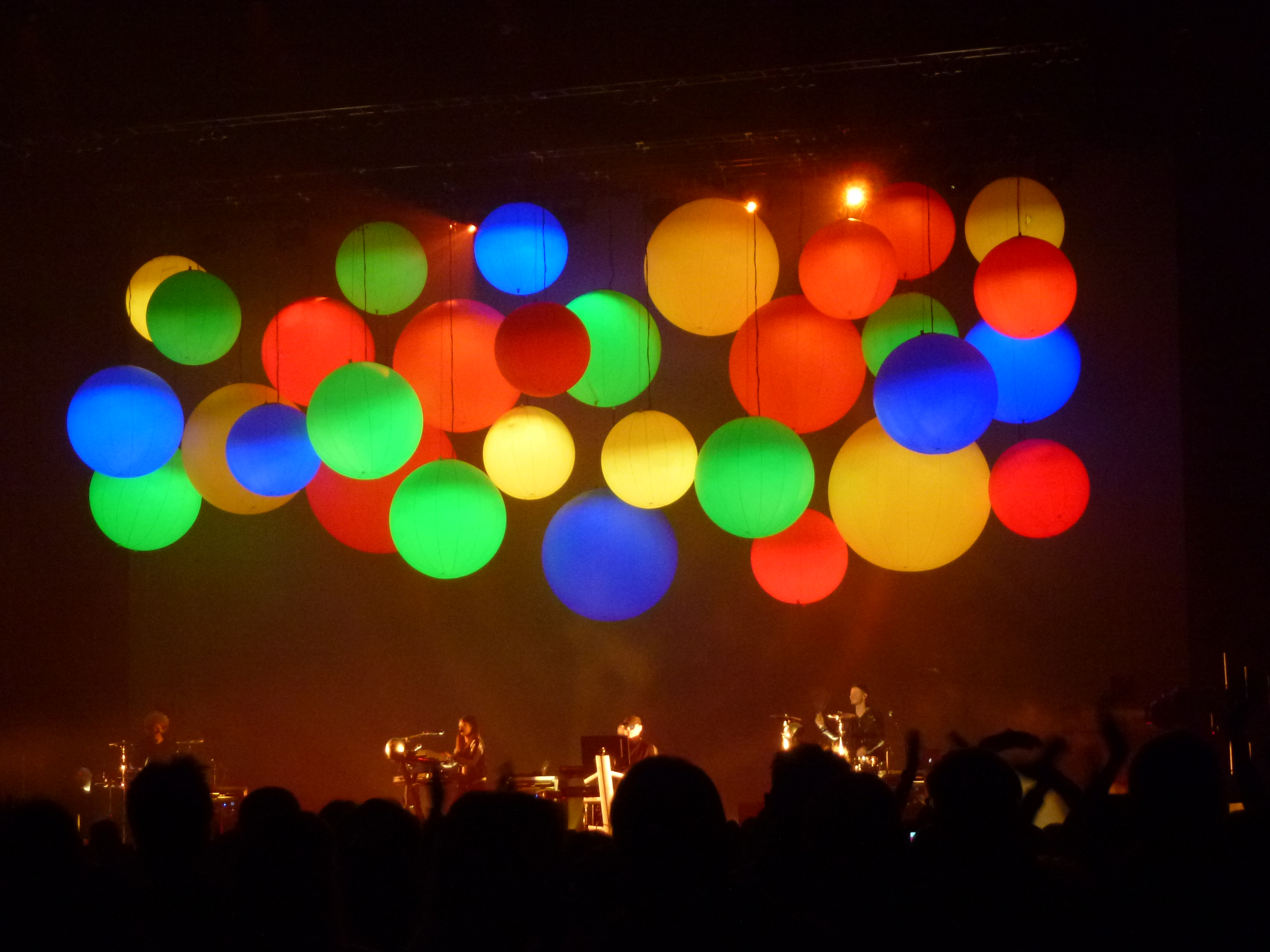
Balloons above the stage at a Super Tour concert

The Super Tour was intended to be "fast-paced, bright, high tech, and overwhelming", according to lighting designer Rob Sinclair. Pet Shop Boys' long-term collaborator Es Devlin was the creative director, and Andrew Turner designed the laser display.

Circles were the central motif, based on the circle logo on the album cover of Super. Concentric LED rings, ranging from 5 to 28 feet in diameter, hung behind the performers. Light from the rings was diffused through a translucent backdrop, which served as a projection surface for video content, and lasers were used to produce a halo effect.

Colours changed throughout, with a blue theme for "Home and Dry" (2002), green for "Vocal" (2013), and red for "It's a Sin" (1987). Lasers provided the primary source of light at times, with only a followspot on singer Neil Tennant. Video projections included Rubik's Cube shapes during "The Pop Kids" (2016) and acid house smiley faces and dollar signs for "Opportunities (Let's Make Lots of Money)" (1985).

During the opening number, the duo were revealed onstage via a pair of rotating circular set pieces that doubled as projection surfaces. For the finale, colourful, glowing balloons were suspended above the stage.

=== Music and performance ===
As a change from previous productions such as the Electric Tour (2013–15) and the Pandemonium Tour (2009–10), Pet Shop Boys decided to have a band playing with them onstage. The touring musicians were Afrika Green on percussion, Christina Hizon on keyboards and violin, and Simon Tellier on percussion and keyboards, with all three singing backing vocals.

The show was split into four acts: In The Night, Sun, Inside, and Euphoric. The duo's entrance to "Inner Sanctum" (2016) was followed by their original hit, "West End Girls" (1985), including extra verses from an early version. (Note: From 2017, "West End Girls" moved down the set list and "Opportunities" took its place.) Recent single "The Pop Kids" led into the early B-side "In the Night" (1985), and a scrim was dropped to reveal the band as the first act ended. Hizon joined Tennant on vocals for "Burn" (2016), and she played violin on "Love Is a Bourgeois Construct" (2013).

Tennant joined in on keyboards for a new arrangement of "Love Comes Quickly" (1986), which was followed by "Love Etc." (2009). A downtempo section included the HappySad remix of "Winner" (2012), and the band followed Tennant across the stage singing harmonies on an ambient mix of "Home and Dry" (2002). Chris Lowe took the lead on the instrumental "The Enigma" (2014) from the Pet Shop Boys' tribute to Alan Turing, A Man from the Future, as a prelude to the euphoric "Vocal" (2013), followed by "The Sodom and Gomorrah Show" (2006).

New versions of several old favourites were introduced. On "Left to My Own Devices" (1988), the original orchestrations were replaced with synthesizers and lively percussion from Green and Tellier. "Go West" (1993) began with an intro from "Heart" (1987). (Note: In 2016, "Opportunities" was used as a lead-in to "Go West" before the full song was added to the set list in 2017.) For the encore, a reworked version of "Domino Dancing" (1988) was followed by "Always on My Mind" (1988) and a reprise of "The Pop Kids".

The Royal Opera House Inner Sanctum shows included dancers, choreographed by Lynne Page. A body popper performed during "New York City Boy" (1999), and a video of the dancer was shown on the tour. Three dancers dressed like aliens in silver suits and helmets appeared onstage and shadowed Tennant during "Inside a Dream" (2013). The finale featured a troupe of dancers in colourful inflatable suits, matching the balloons overhead.

=== Costumes ===
The Guardian noted in a concert review, "Headgear turns out to be a big feature". The duo entered wearing metallic helmets, with Lowe's encasing his entire head and Tennant's resembling a garland crown. The trio of band members also wore helmets, which they kept on for much of the show, switching to multi-coloured headgear for the finale.

Lowe reverted to his trademark cap and shades with casual attire, while Tennant wore a black suit and tie. For "The Dictator Decides" (2016), Tennant donned a Russian hat and greatcoat, which he then traded for a silver jacket.

== Critical reception ==
Several reviewers were impressed by the stage production. Shaun Curran of The Independent described the 2016 Royal Opera House residency as "Affected, moving, colourful and flat out fun, it is some spectacle", while Will Hodgkinson of The Times called the 2018 version "rave lasers in overdrive, blob dancers in freeform, ageing pop kids having the time of their lives". A reviewer for the Edinburgh Evening News wrote of a show at The Playhouse: "If ever evidence were needed that Pet Shop Boys' gigs are so much more than just a concert, last night did just that. A full-on theatrical production, it was a glorious sensory overload". Joe Lynch from Billboard described the New York City concert: "There was a stark white-and-black arcade game aesthetic, a picturesque sunset paired with smoky wide-beam lasers, concentric circles rendered in vibrant greens, blues and pinks, and glowing, multi-colored balloons at the close of the show."

Reviewers also commented on the music selections. Gordon Barr of the Newcastle Chronicle wrote: "This is a tour through the entire Pet Shop Boys career, right up to last year's Super album, with a smattering of tracks from that collection sitting nicely with the hits we have grown to love – and never tire of – over the past three decades". Angelo Santoro of New York Live described "that special feeling when you begin to hear the opening of the universal anthem ["West End Girls"]. Having this song appear between the two newest "Inner Sanctum", and "The Pop Kids", you get a good sense of how they have continued to compose revolutionary music". Hodgkinson of The Times summed up, "After nearly 40 years in the game, Pet Shop Boys have carved out a unique position in pop. They are the same as they ever were, yet remain fresh and vibrant".

== Set list ==
The following set lists are from the shows in Toronto (6 November 2016), Birmingham (24 February 2017), and London (25–28 July 2018). They are not intended to represent all shows of the tour.

2016
1. "Inner Sanctum"
2. "West End Girls"
3. "The Pop Kids"
4. "In the Night"
5. "Burn"
6. "Love Is a Bourgeois Construct"
7. "New York City Boy"
8. "Se a vida é (That's the Way Life Is)"
9. "Twenty-something"
10. "Love Comes Quickly"
11. "Love Etc."
12. "The Dictator Decides"
13. "Inside a Dream"
14. "Winner (Andrew Dawson HappySad Remix)"
15. "Home and Dry (Ambient Mix)"
16. "The Enigma"
17. "Vocal"
18. "The Sodom and Gomorrah Show"
19. "It's a Sin"
20. "Left to My Own Devices" (new version)
21. "Go West"

Encore

1. "Domino Dancing" (new version)
2. "Always on My Mind"
3. "The Pop Kids" (reprise)
2017
1. "Inner Sanctum"
2. "Opportunities (Let's Make Lots of Money)"
3. "The Pop Kids"
4. "In the Night"
5. "Burn"
6. "Love Is a Bourgeois Construct"
7. "New York City Boy"
8. "Se a vida é (That's the Way Life Is)"
9. "Love Comes Quickly"
10. "Love Etc."
11. "The Dictator Decides"
12. "Inside a Dream"
13. "West End Girls"
14. "Winner (Andrew Dawson HappySad Remix)"
15. "Home and Dry (Ambient Mix)"
16. "The Enigma"
17. "Vocal"
18. "The Sodom and Gomorrah Show"
19. "It's a Sin"
20. "Left to My Own Devices" (new version)
21. "Go West" (with "Heart" intro)

Encore

1. "Domino Dancing" (new version)
2. "Always on My Mind"
3. "The Pop Kids" (reprise)
2018
1. "Inner Sanctum"
2. "Opportunities (Let's Make Lots of Money)"
3. "The Pop Kids"
4. "In the Night"
5. "Burn"
6. "Love Is a Bourgeois Construct"
7. "New York City Boy"
8. "Se a vida é (That's the Way Life Is)"
9. "Love Comes Quickly"
10. "Love Etc."
11. "The Dictator Decides"
12. "Inside a Dream"
13. "West End Girls"
14. "Home and Dry (Ambient Mix)"
15. "The Enigma"
16. "Vocal"
17. "The Sodom and Gomorrah Show"
18. "It's a Sin"
19. "Left to My Own Devices" (new version)
20. "Go West" (with "Heart" intro)

Encore

1. "Domino Dancing" (new version)
2. "Always on My Mind"
3. "The Pop Kids" (reprise)

The 2016 set list includes five songs from the album Super; three songs each from Introspective (1988) and Electric (2013); two from Please (1986); one each from Actually (1987), Very (1993), Bilingual (1996), Nightlife (1999), Release (2002), Fundamental (2006), Yes (2009), and Elysium (2012); and two non-album songs.

== Tour dates ==
Date	City	Country	Venue
Europe
20 July 2016	London	England	Royal Opera House
21 July 2016	London	England	Royal Opera House
22 July 2016	London	England	Royal Opera House
23 July 2016	London	England	Royal Opera House
South America
13 October 2016	Santiago	Chile	Espacio Riesco Convention Center
15 October 2016	Buenos Aires	Argentina	BUE Festival 2016
North America
21 October 2016	Las Vegas	United States	The Chelsea at The Cosmopolitan
22 October 2016	Salt Lake City	United States	The Complex
24 October 2016	Vancouver	Canada	Queen Elizabeth Theatre
25 October 2016	Portland	United States	Keller Auditorium
27 October 2016	Oakland	United States	Fox Oakland Theatre
28 October 2016	Oakland	United States	Fox Oakland Theatre
29 October 2016	Los Angeles	United States	Microsoft Theater
1 November 2016	Austin	United States	Long Center for the Performing Arts
2 November 2016	Houston	United States	White Oak Music Hall
4 November 2016	Nashville	United States	Tennessee Performing Arts Center
5 November 2016	Chicago	United States	Civic Opera House
6 November 2016	Toronto	Canada	Sony Centre for the Performing Arts
9 November 2016	Boston	United States	Orpheum Theatre
10 November 2016	Morristown	United States	Mayo Performing Arts Center
11 November 2016	Washington, D.C.	United States	Warner Theatre
12 November 2016	New York City	United States	Hulu Theater at Madison Square Garden
14 November 2016	Atlanta	United States	Symphony Hall
15 November 2016	St. Petersburg	United States	Mahaffey Theater
16 November 2016	Miami Beach	United States	Fillmore Miami Beach
19 November 2016	Mexico City	Mexico	Corona Capital Festival
Europe & Middle East
26 November 2016	Leipzig	Germany	Arena Leipzig
27 November 2016	Cologne	Germany	Palladium Köln
28 November 2016	Tilburg	Netherlands	013
30 November 2016	Hamburg	Germany	Mehr! Theater am Goßmarkt
1 December 2016	Berlin	Germany	Tempodrom
2 December 2016	Frankfurt Am Main	Germany	Jahrunderthalle Frankfurt
4 December 2016	Copenhagen	Denmark	Copenhagen Opera House
5 December 2016	Copenhagen	Denmark	Copenhagen Opera House
8 December 2016	Moscow	Russia	VTP Park Legend Arena
18 February 2017	Leeds	England	First Direct Arena
19 February 2017	Manchester	England	Manchester Arena
21 February 2017	Glasgow	Scotland	Clyde Auditorium
22 February 2017	Edinburgh	Scotland	Edinburgh Playhouse
24 February 2017	Birmingham	England	Barclaycard Arena
26 February 2017	Bournemouth	England	Bournemouth International Centre
10 June 2017	Tel Aviv	Israel	Yarkon Park
17 June 2017	Bergen	Norway	Bergenfest
21 June 2017	Blackpool	England	Empress Ballroom
22 June 2017	Nottingham	England	Motorpoint Arena Nottingham
24 June 2017	Odense	Denmark	Tinderbox Festival
25 June 2017	Hanover	Germany	Swiss Life Hall
26 June 2017	Baden-Baden	Germany	Festspielhaus
28 June 2017	Mainz	Germany	Halle 45
29 June 2017	Dresden	Germany	Filmnächte am Elbufer
1 July 2017	Berlin	Germany	Mercedes-Benz Arena
3 July 2017	Montreux	Switzerland	Montreux Jazz Festival
6 July 2017	Henley-on-Thames	England	Henley Music Festival
8 July 2017	Barcelona	Spain	Cruïlla Festival
10 July 2017	Madrid	Spain	Teatro Real
17 July 2017	Bochum	Germany	RuhrCongress
18 July 2017	Amsterdam	Netherlands	Royal Theater Carré
22 July 2017	Turku	Finland	Tall Ships Races Music Festival
27 July 2017	Rättvik	Sweden	Dalhalla
28 July 2017	Östersund	Sweden	Storsjöyran Festival
31 July 2017	Lucca	Italy	Lucca Summer Festival
5 August 2017	Brighton	England	Preston Park
12 August 2017	Zadar	Croatia	Jazine Open Air
15 August 2017	Brussels	Belgium	Brussels Summer Festival
2 September 2017	Gateshead	England	Sage Gateshead
3 September 2017	Gateshead	England	Sage Gateshead
5 September 2017	Dublin	Ireland	Bord Gáis Energy Theatre
6 September 2017	Dublin	Ireland	Bord Gáis Energy Theatre
10 September 2017	Dorset	England	Bestival
Latin America
15 September 2017	Rio de Janeiro	Brazil	Rock in Rio
17 September 2017	Brasília	Brazil	NET Live Brasilía
19 September 2017	São Paulo	Brazil	Espaço das Américas
21 September 2017	Curitiba	Brazil	Live Curitiba
23 September 2017	Porto Alegre	Brazil	Pepsi on Stage
27 September 2017	Lima	Peru	Anfiteatro del Parque de la Exposición
1 October 2017	Monterrey	Mexico	Auditorio Pabellón M
3 October 2017	Mexico City	Mexico	Palacio de los Deportes
6 October 2017	Medellín	Colombia	Breakfest Festival
Europe
6 July 2018	Tallinn	Estonia	Õllesummer Festival
7 July 2018	Töreboda	Sweden	Törebodafestivalen
18 July 2018	Marbella	Spain	Starlite Festival
21 July 2018	Benicàssim	Spain	Festival Internacional de Benicàssim
25 July 2018	London	England	Royal Opera House
26 July 2018	London	England	Royal Opera House
27 July 2018	London	England	Royal Opera House
28 July 2018	London	England	Royal Opera House
2 August 2018	Helsinki	Finland	Helsinki Ice Hall
4 August 2018	Vaasa	Finland	Wasa Open Air
24 August 2018	Szeged	Hungary	SZIN Festival
Asia
26 March 2019	Singapore	Singapore	The Star Performing Arts Centre
28 March 2019	Hong Kong	Hong Kong	AsiaWorld–Expo Hall 10
1 April 2019	Tokyo	Japan	Nippon Budokan
2 April 2019	Osaka	Japan	Festival Hall

=== Additional performances ===
Date	City	Country	Venue
14 September 2019	London	England	229 The Venue
15 September 2019	Hyde Park	England	Radio 2 in the Park

=== Cancelled dates ===
Date	City	Country	Venue	Reason
28 February 2017	Paris	France	Olympia	Indoor laser show not permitted. Initially rescheduled to 5 June then cancelled.
4 August 2017	Heddon-on-the-Wall	England	Festival on the Wall	Festival cancelled due to operational challenges.
4 April 2019	Bangkok	Thailand	Impact, Muang Thong Thani	Circumstances beyond control.

== Personnel ==
Credits adapted from the Super tour programme (2016) and "Pet Shop Boys 'Super' Tour" (PLSN, 2016).

Pet Shop Boys

- Neil Tennant – vocals
- Chris Lowe – keyboards

Touring musicians

- Afrika Green – percussion, backing vocals
- Christina Hizon – keyboards, violin, backing vocals
- Simon Tellier – percussion, keyboards, backing vocals

Creative team

- Es Devlin – creative director and set design
- Lynne Page – stage director
- Stuart Price – music producer
- Pete Gleadall – music director and programmer
- Luke Halls – video content
- Tal Rosner – video content
- Rob Sinclair – lighting design
- Ben Cash – lighting programmer
- Andrew Turner – laser design
- Robert Allsopp – masks and headpieces

Tour personnel

- Andy Crookston – tour manager
- Olli Windprechtinger – production manager
- Holger Schwark – sound engineer
- Seamus Fenton – monitor engineer
- Hansi Kecker – computer and keyboard technician
- Ringo Landowsky – stage manager
- Jon Barker – lighting director
- Michael Bowerman – lighting crew chief
- Travis Robinson – lighting technician
- Colleen Wittenberg – lighting technician
- Kenny Rutkowski – lighting technician
- James Adkins – video and projection director
- Tom Vallis – laser programmer and operator
- Michael McGuire – set carpenter
- Tobin Armstrong – backline and audio technician
- Michael 'Monk' Shear – audio technician
- Jeffrey Bryant – wardrobe
- Danielle Dowden – make-up and production coordinator
