= Radio 2 in the Park =

British music festival

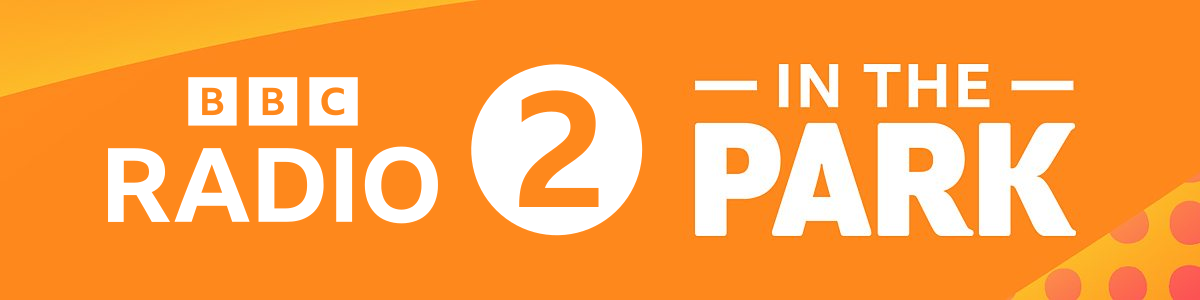

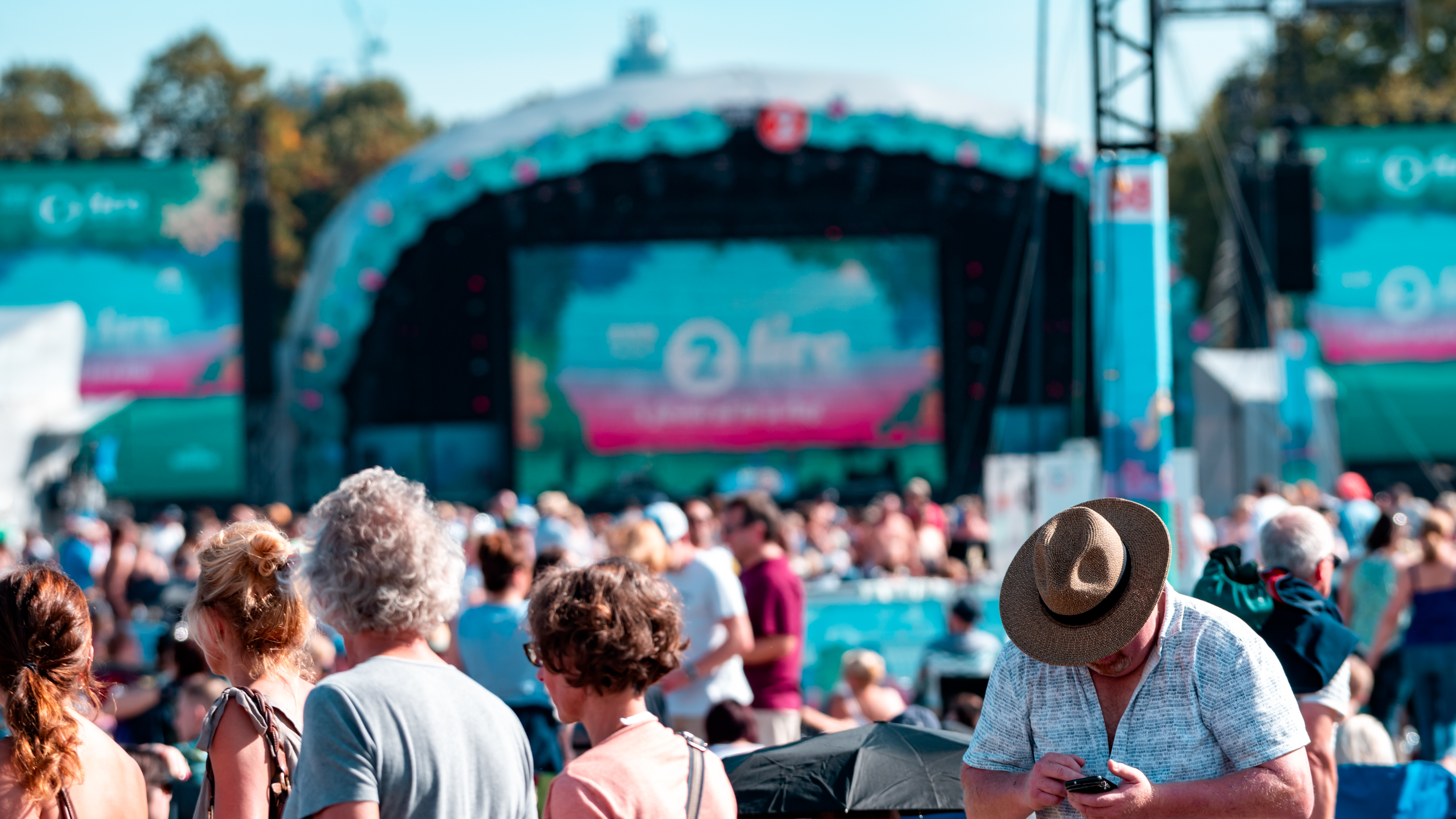
- Genre: Adult contemporary
- Dates: September
- Frequency: Annually
- Locations: Hyde Park, London (2011–2019); United Kingdom (Touring; 2023–present)
- Years active: 2011–present
- Attendance: 45,000 (2017)
- Website: www.bbc.co.uk/events/e4jqwh

Locations that have hosted Radio 2 in the Park

Radio 2 in the Park (formerly known as Radio 2 Live and Radio 2's Festival in a Day) is a British music festival organised by BBC Radio 2. From 2011 to 2019, it was held annually in Hyde Park in London. Starting with Leicester in 2023, it has been held annually in various locations in the UK.

Performances are broadcast live on Radio 2 and BBC Sounds, and live streamed on BBC iPlayer. In 2017, attendance was 45,000.

== Performers ==
=== Live in Hyde Park 2011 ===
The inaugural festival in a day was held on 11 September 2011. Lionel Richie was originally set to headline the event but was forced to cancel due to ill health.

- Gary Barlow
- Chic
- The Pierces
- James Blunt
- Imelda May
- Lenny Kravitz
- Jonathan Jeremiah
- Will Young
- Caro Emerald
- Beverley Knight
- Bellowhead
- Jools Holland and his Orchestra
Gary Barlow setlist
1. Greatest Day
2. Patience
3. Hello
4. A Million Love Songs
5. Back for Good
6. Rule the World
7. Never Forget

=== Live in Hyde Park 2012 ===
The 2012 festival in a day was held on 9 September.

- Tom Jones
- Status Quo
- Emeli Sandé
- Jessie J
- Paloma Faith
- Rebecca Ferguson
- Average White Band
- Mick Hucknall
- The Band Perry
- Katzenjammer
- Angela Barnes
Tom Jones setlist
1. Hit or Miss
2. Mama Told Me Not to Come
3. Mockingbird with Jessie J
4. Didn't It Rain
5. Evil is Goin' On
6. Burning Hell
7. (I Want to) Come Home
8. Green, Green Grass of Home
9. Delilah
10. You Can Leave Your Hat On
11. If I Only Knew
12. It's Not Unusual
13. Kiss

=== Live in Hyde Park 2013 ===
The 2013 festival in a day was held on 8 September.

- Smokey Robinson
- Jessie J
- James Blunt
- Josh Groban
- Manic Street Preachers
- Jack Johnson
- Texas
- Jamie Cullum
- Simple Minds
- Treacherous Orchestra
Smokey Robinson setlist
1. Going to a Go-Go
2. I Second That Emotion
3. You've Really Got a Hold on Me
4. Ooo Baby Baby
5. The Tears of a Clown
6. The Way You Do the Things You Do
7. Get Ready
8. My Girl
9. Just to See Her
10. The Tracks of My Tears
11. Cruisin'

=== Live in Hyde Park 2014 ===
The 2014 festival in a day was held on 14 September.

- Jeff Lynne's ELO
- Blondie
- Billy Ocean
- Paloma Faith
- Gregory Porter
- Kacey Musgraves
- Bellowhead
- Chrissie Hynde
Jeff Lynne's ELO setlist
1. All Over the World
2. Evil Woman
3. Ma-Ma-Ma Belle
4. Showdown
5. Livin' Thing
6. Strange Magic
7. 10538 Overture
8. Can't Get It Out of My Head
9. Sweet Talkin' Woman
10. Turn to Stone
11. Steppin' Out
12. Handle with Care
13. Don't Bring Me Down
14. Rock 'n' Roll Is King
15. Telephone Line
16. Mr. Blue Sky
17. Roll Over Beethoven

=== Live in Hyde Park 2015 ===
The 2015 festival in a day was held on 13 September. The line-up was revealed by Chris Evans between 8 and 12 June.

- Rod Stewart
- Giorgio Moroder
- Bryan Adams
- The Corrs
- Leona Lewis
- Kate Rusby
- Will Young
- Shaun Escoffery
- Ward Thomas and The Shires
Rod Stewart setlist
1. Every Beat of My Heart
2. The Motown Song
3. What Am I Gonna Do (I'm So in Love with You)
4. (I Know) I'm Losing You
5. You Can Make Me Dance, Sing or Anything (Even Take the Dog for a Walk, Mend a Fuse, Fold Away the Ironing Board, or Any Other Domestic Shortcomings)
6. Gasoline Alley
7. The Killing of Georgie (Part I and II)
8. Ooh La La
9. Tom Traubert's Blues
10. Please
11. Angel
12. I'm Every Woman
13. Roll and Tumble Blues
14. In a Broken Dream
15. Love Is
16. Can't Stop Me Now
17. I Was Only Joking with Jim Cregan

=== Live in Hyde Park 2016 ===
The 2016 festival in a day was held on 11 September. It also featured a DJ set by Craig Charles and a special edition of PopMaster with Ken Bruce.

- Elton John
- Madness
- Status Quo
- Gregory Porter
- LeAnn Rimes
- Jamie Lawson
- Andreya Triana
- Travis
Elton John setlist
1. The Bitch Is Back
2. Bennie and the Jets
3. I Guess That's Why They Call It the Blues
4. Philadelphia Freedom
5. Looking Up
6. A Good Heart
7. Rocket Man
8. Tiny Dancer
9. Levon
10. Your Song
11. Goodbye Yellow Brick Road
12. Sad Songs (Say So Much)
13. Don't Let the Sun Go Down on Me
14. I'm Still Standing
15. Saturday Night's Alright for Fighting
16. Crocodile Rock

=== Live in Hyde Park 2017 ===
The 2017 festival in a day was held on 10 September. The line-up was announced on 6 June by Chris Evans, with tickets for the event going on sale on 8 June. Between the main acts, the festival also featured a special edition of PopMaster with Ken Bruce, Sounds of the 80s with Sara Cox, A Question of Radio 2 with Clare Balding, Jeremy Vine, Fearne Cotton, Jon Culshaw and Rev. Kate Bottley plus live DJ sets from Craig Charles and Ana Matronic.

- Take That
- Blondie
- Shania Twain
- James Blunt
- Emeli Sandé
- Rick Astley
- Seth Lakeman and Wildwood Kin
- Stereophonics
Take That setlist
1. Shine
2. Greatest Day
3. Get Ready for It
4. Giants
5. Hold Up a Light
6. Patience
7. Pray
8. Everything Changes
9. It Only Takes a Minute
10. Could It Be Magic
11. Back for Good
12. The Flood
13. Cry
14. Relight My Fire
15. These Days
16. Rule the World
17. Never Forget

=== Live in Hyde Park 2018 ===
The 2018 festival in a day was held on 9 September. Carrie Underwood was scheduled to perform but had to pull out due to illness and was replaced by The Shires. The festival featured a special edition of PopMaster with Ken Bruce and Sounds of the 80s with Gary Davies plus a DJ set from Craig Charles. During the headline set, Rick Astley and Jason Donovan appeared as special guests.

- Kylie Minogue
- Manic Street Preachers
- Boyzone
- The Shires
- All Saints
- The Band of Love
- Rita Ora
- Lenny Kravitz
Kylie Minogue setlist
1. Golden
2. Spinning Around
3. Got to Be Certain
4. Step Back in Time
5. Je ne sais pas pourquoi
6. In Your Eyes
7. Stop Me from Falling
8. Can't Get You Out of My Head
9. Especially for You with Jason Donovan
10. The Loco-Motion
11. On a Night Like This
12. I Should Be So Lucky/Never Gonna Give You Up with Rick Astley
13. Kids with Rick Astley
14. Dancing
15. Love at First Sight
16. All the Lovers

=== Live in Hyde Park 2019 ===
The 2019 festival in a day was held on 15 September. Two acts were announced each day by Zoe Ball starting on Monday 3 June 2019, with the headliners the Pet Shop Boys being revealed on Thursday 6 June. Emeli Sandé was originally scheduled to perform but cancelled on the day due to having lost her voice. Her set was replaced by a Craig Charles DJ set. There was also a DJ set from Gary Davies. During the headlining set, Olly Alexander and Beverley Knight appeared as special guests.

- Pet Shop Boys
- Westlife
- Status Quo
- Clean Bandit
- Bananarama
- Kelsea Ballerini
- Simply Red
Pet Shop Boys setlist
1. Suburbia
2. Burn
3. Se a vida é (That's the Way Life Is)
4. West End Girls
5. Dreamland with Olly Alexander
6. Vocal
7. Heart
8. It's a Sin
9. Left to My Own Devices
10. Opportunities/Rent
11. Go West
12. Domino Dancing
13. What Have I Done to Deserve This? with Beverley Knight
14. Always on My Mind
15. The Pop Kids

=== Live in Hyde Park 2020 ===
This year's Live in Hyde Park was a virtual affair due to COVID-19.

On 12 and 13 September 2020, the BBC aired new sets recorded from home by Sheryl Crow, Nile Rodgers and Chic featuring Rebecca Ferguson, Craig David, Erasure, Sir Tom Jones, The Killers, John Legend, McFly, Gregory Porter and The Pretenders. Several past performances by Sir Elton John, Jeff Lynne, Kylie Minogue, Pet Shop Boys, Rita Ora, Sir Rod Stewart, Shania Twain, Smokey Robinson and Take That were also made available to watch on BBC iPlayer.

=== Radio 2 Live in Leeds 2022 ===
Following two successive completely cancelled years due to the COVID-19 pandemic, it was announced on 5 April 2022 that the event was to be rebranded as Radio 2 Live and would take place in Leeds at Temple Newsam on 17 and 18 September. The line-up was announced on 14 June by Zoe Ball, revealing that Simple Minds would be headlining the event. Ball also stated that two additional acts would be announced in the following weeks On 2 August, Robbie Williams and the BBC Concert Orchestra were revealed as the second headliner alongside Elbow and the Radio 2 DJ line-up, which features Richie Anderson, Sara Cox, Rylan Clark, DJ Spoony, Jo Whiley, Dermot O'Leary, Gary Davies, Trevor Nelson, Tony Blackburn, Kate Bottley, and OJ Borg. However, on 9 September, the event was completely cancelled following the death of Queen Elizabeth II the previous day.

=== Radio 2 in the Park, Leicester 2023 ===
On 12 June 2023 after a hat-trick of cancellations, it was announced that Leicester would be hosting Radio 2 in the Park on Saturday 16 and Sunday 17 September at Victoria Park. The following day, Zoe Ball announced the full line up, with Kylie Minogue as headliner and also featuring Rick Astley, Sam Ryder, James Blunt, Bananarama, and Tears for Fears, the latter two of whom were previously slated to appear at the 2022 event, which was completely cancelled last year due to the death of Elizabeth II. The festival featured DJ sets from Gary Davies, Rylan Clark, and Scott Mills.

Saturday 16

- Tears for Fears
- Bananarama
- Texas
- James Blunt
- Deacon Blue
- Beverley Knight
- Busted
- Soft Cell

Sunday 17

- Kylie Minogue
- The Pretenders
- Shalamar
- Rick Astley
- Jessie Ware
- Lemar
- Sam Ryder
- Simply Red

Tears for Fears setlist
1. No Small Thing
2. The Tipping Point
3. Everybody Wants to Rule the World
4. Sowing the Seeds of Love
5. Long, Long, Long Time
6. Break the Man
7. My Demons
8. Rivers of Mercy
9. Mad World
10. Change
11. Suffer the Children with Carina Round
12. Pale Shelter
13. Break It Down Again
14. Head over Heels/Broken
15. Shout
Kylie Minogue setlist
1. Spinning Around
2. In Your Eyes
3. On a Night Like This
4. Wow
5. Tension
6. Slow
7. Say Something
8. Kiss of Life with Jessie Ware
9. Hold on to Now
10. Love at First Sight
11. The Loco-Motion
12. Kids
13. Padam Padam
14. Can't Get You Out of My Head
15. All the Lovers

=== Radio 2 in the Park, Preston 2024 ===
On 24 April 2024, it was announced that Moor Park in Preston would be hosting Radio 2 in the Park 2024 on Saturday 7 and Sunday 8 September, with tickets going on sale on 5 June, 2024. An additional "pre-party" also took place on Friday 6 September, featuring sets by Radio 2 DJs Vernon Kay, Sara Cox, Rylan Clark, Scott Mills, and DJ Spoony. The full line-up was announced on 3 June by Zoe Ball live on the breakfast show. During Shed Seven's set, Ferris & Sylvester appeared as special guests.

Saturday 7

- Sting
- Sugababes
- Snow Patrol
- Craig David
- Kim Wilde
- Pixie Lott
- Shaznay Lewis
- Travis

Sunday 8

- Pet Shop Boys
- Manic Street Preachers
- Sister Sledge ft. Kathy Sledge
- Gabrielle
- Shed Seven
- Paul Heaton
- Delta Goodrem
- Haircut 100
Sting setlist
1. Message in a Bottle
2. If I Ever Lose My Faith in You
3. Englishman in New York
4. Every Little Thing She Does Is Magic
5. Fields of Gold
6. Never Coming Home
7. Driven to Tears
8. Can't Stand Losing You
9. Reggatta de Blanc
10. I Wrote Your Name
11. Shape of My Heart
12. Walking on the Moon
13. So Lonely
14. Desert Rose
15. Every Breath You Take
16. Roxanne
Pet Shop Boys setlist
1. Suburbia
2. Can You Forgive Her?
3. Where the Streets Have No Name (I Can't Take My Eyes Off You)
4. Rent
5. I Don't Know What You Want but I Can't Give It Any More
6. So Hard
7. Left to My Own Devices
8. Domino Dancing
9. A New Bohemia
10. Love Comes Quickly
11. Paninaro
12. Always on My Mind
13. Dreamland
14. Heart
15. It's Alright
16. Vocal
17. Go West
18. It's a Sin
19. West End Girls
20. Being Boring

=== Radio 2 in the Park, Chelmsford 2025 ===
On 3 June 2025, it was announced that Hylands Park in Chelmsford, Essex would be hosting Radio 2 in the Park 2025 on Saturday 6 and Sunday 7 September, with tickets going on sale the following day. An additional "pre-party" took place on Friday 5 September, featuring sets by Radio 2 DJs Vernon Kay, Scott Mills, Rylan Clark, DJ Spoony, and Michelle Visage.

Saturday 6

- Bryan Adams
- Belinda Carlisle
- Ronan Keating
- Jessie J
- Kid Creole and the Coconuts
- Marti Pellow
- Ella Henderson
- Stereophonics

Sunday 7

- Def Leppard
- Olly Murs
- Anastacia
- Soul II Soul
- Suede
- Louise Redknapp
- David Gray
- Sophie Ellis-Bextor
Bryan Adams setlist
1. Kick Ass
2. Run to You
3. Somebody
4. Roll with the Punches
5. 18 til I Die
6. Shine a Light
7. Heaven
8. Make Up Your Mind
9. You Belong to Me/Blue Suede Shoes
10. When You're Gone with Melanie C
11. The Only Thing That Looks Good on Me Is You
12. Never Ever Let You Go
13. (Everything I Do) I Do It for You
14. Back to You
15. So Happy It Hurts
16. Cuts Like a Knife
17. Summer of '69
Def Leppard setlist
1. Rock! Rock! (Till You Drop)
2. Rocket
3. Let's Get Rocked
4. Foolin'
5. Armageddon It
6. Animal
7. Love Bites
8. Just Like'73
9. Bringin' On the Heartbreak
10. Switch 625
11. When Love & Hate Collide
12. Rock of Ages
13. Photograph
14. Hysteria
15. Pour Some Sugar on Me

=== Radio 2 in the Park, Stirling 2026 ===
Radio 2 in the Park is set to be hosted in City Park in Stirling from Friday 11 to Sunday 13 September 2026, marking the first major BBC music event to be held in Scotland since the 2023 edition of BBC Radio 1's Big Weekend in Dundee. The event was originally planned to be held between 7 and 9 August, but was rescheduled to a later date to prevent clashes with local events. Snoop Dogg and Alexandra Burke made guest appearances during headliner Chaka Khan's set.

The full line-up was announced in June 2026.

Saturday 12

- Chaka Khan
- The Script
- Emeli Sandé
- ABC
- Jack Savoretti
- Lulu
- Texas

Sunday 13

- Simple Minds
- Deacon Blue
- James Blunt
- Level 42
- Blue
- Cast
- Appleton
Chaka Khan setlist
1. This Is My Night
2. Do You Love What You Feel
3. Tell Me Something Good
4. What Cha' Gonna Do for Me
5. Through the Fire
6. Magic In Your Eyes
7. Love Me Still
8. Chakzilla
9. Boogie's in My Soul with Snoop Dogg
10. I Feel for You
11. I'm Every Woman with Alexandra Burke
12. Ain't Nobody
Simple Minds setlist
