= Dreamworld: The Greatest Hits Live =

2022–26 concert tour by Pet Shop Boys

- Tour by Pet Shop Boys
- Promotional poster for the tour
- Location: Europe; North America; Latin America; Asia
- Associated album: Smash: The Singles 1985–2020
- Start date: 10 May 2022
- Legs: 8
- No. of shows: 113

Pet Shop Boys concert chronology
- Super Tour (2016–19); Dreamworld: The Greatest Hits Live (2022–26); Obscure (2026)

Dreamworld: The Greatest Hits Live is a worldwide concert tour by English synth-pop duo Pet Shop Boys. Billed by the group as their "first ever Greatest Hits tour", Dreamworld was originally announced on 11 September 2019, to take place in arenas across the United Kingdom from May to June 2020. The dates were postponed several times as a result of the COVID-19 pandemic. The tour ultimately began on 10 May 2022, at Teatro degli Arcimboldi in Milan.

The tour included stops at Glastonbury Festival in 2022 and the Primavera Sound festivals in Barcelona, Madrid and Porto in June 2023, as well as its Latin American counterparts in November and December 2023. A five-night residency was held at the Royal Opera House in London in July 2024. Dreamworld continued in Europe in the summer of 2025 and visited Japan in January 2026. Additional concerts in 2026 include the Viña del Mar International Song Festival in Chile and the Lytham Festival in the UK.

In 2023, Pet Shop Boys released Smash: The Singles 1985–2020, a greatest hits album inspired by the tour. A film recording of the tour's stop in Copenhagen premiered in cinemas worldwide in January and February 2024, under the title Dreamworld: The Greatest Hits Live at the Royal Arena Copenhagen.

== Background and itinerary ==
On 11 September 2019, Pet Shop Boys announced their first-ever greatest hits tour, "Dreamworld: The Greatest Hits Live", with seven dates in arenas throughout the United Kingdom, beginning on 28 May 2020 at London's The O2 Arena and ending on 6 June at Glasgow's SSE Hydro. On 14 November 2019, with the announcement of the duo's fourteenth album Hotspot, more tour dates were revealed, with the tour now scheduled to begin on 1 May at the Mercedes-Benz Arena in Berlin and end on 19 June at the OverOslo festival in Oslo. However, on 8 April 2020, Pet Shop Boys announced that the United Kingdom dates would be rescheduled to May and June 2021, following government advice as a result of the COVID-19 pandemic. On 3 February 2021, the Pet Shop Boys rescheduled the tour again, this time to begin on 13 May 2022 at Vienna's Gasometer and end on 15 June 2022 in Stockholm's Ericsson Globe. On 19 October 2021, six more dates were added, including the first show on 10 May 2022 in Milan's Teatro degli Arcimboldi and a tentative end date on 6 July 2022 at Budapest Park. Finally, on 4 March 2022, the Pet Shop Boys announced the final show of the first leg, taking place on 16 July 2022 at the Gran Canaria Arena in the Canary Islands.

Pet Shop Boys performed Dreamworld at Glastonbury Festival 2022 on 26 June, with Olly Alexander of Years & Years joining the band onstage for their collaboration "Dreamland".

In September and October 2022, Pet Shop Boys co-headlined the Unity Tour in North America with New Order.

The Dreamworld tour resumed on 31 December 2022, headlining Edinburgh's Hogmanay Concert in the Gardens. Pet Shop Boys performed Dreamworld at the Primavera Sound festival in Barcelona, Madrid and Porto in June 2023, including free sideshows at the 2,900-capacity Sala Apolo in Barcelona and 1,550-capacity Joy Eslava in Madrid. The tour continued through the United Kingdom and Europe from 13 June to 9 July, from Rome to Gothenburg.

The tour visited Latin America from 19 November 2023 to 10 December 2023. It began at the Corona Capital festival in Mexico City and ended at the "Road to Primavera Sound" event in Bogotá after the original festival was cancelled and downsized.

The tour was further scheduled to continue in 2024, with a United Kingdom run from 4 to 11 June and a European run from 26 June to 6 July. The band's 11 June concert in Belfast was their first there since 1991. In July, they played a five-night residency at the Royal Opera House in London. On 22 July, the duo announced a standalone show on 6 September in Blackpool, performing at Funny Girls cabaret bar for the first time in their 43-year career. The concert was 'an intimate performance' intended as a warm-up for their subsequent appearance at the thirteenth iteration of Radio 2 in the Park, as headliners of the event's final night on 8 September 2024.

In the summer of 2025, Dreamworld carried on with festival stops in Europe, including both the Lisbon and Madrid sites of Kalorama, and four concerts in the UK, concluding at Warwick Castle at the end of August. The tour made its first visit to Japan in January 2026, with dates in Tokyo and Kobe. Pet Shop Boys were also scheduled to headline the rockin' on sonic festival in Chiba, Japan, but were forced to cancel when Tennant became ill. In February 2026, the duo performed at the Viña del Mar International Song Festival in Chile, where they received the Gaviota de Plata (Silver Seagull) and Gaviota de Oro (Gold Seagull) audience awards. The tour returns to Europe for more shows in the summer of 2026, including a headline appearance at the Lytham Festival in Lancashire, England, in July.

== Concert synopsis ==
The concert begins with the 1986 single "Suburbia" as Neil Tennant and Chris Lowe stand onstage between two streetlight props, both sporting tuning fork headwear. Behind the duo is a screen displaying moving images for each song. In between "Can You Forgive Her?" and "Opportunities (Let's Make Lots of Money)", Tennant removes his tuning fork mask. During the instrumental intro of "Left to My Own Devices", the streetlights are removed and the screen is lifted, revealing the backing band for the first time. Lowe unmasks himself and moves to a new elevated platform that was previously hidden behind the screen, while Tennant changes costumes. Before "Dreamland", Tennant and Lowe change costumes again, sporting silver overcoats. Throughout the concert, Tennant explains the origins of the songs on the set list, such as telling a story of how "Domino Dancing" came from a friend's victory dance after playing dominoes in Saint Lucia. The main set ends with "It's a Sin".

For the encore of "West End Girls" and "Being Boring", Tennant changes into a black trench coat while Lowe wears his own "Boy" brand baseball cap, as a nod to the duo's trademark look during the 1980s.

== Concert film ==
The concert film Dreamworld: The Greatest Hits Live at the Royal Arena Copenhagen was filmed using footage from the tour's 7 July 2023 date at the Royal Arena in Copenhagen. It was directed by David Barnard and recorded in 4K resolution by 14 different cameras. It was released through Trafalgar Releasing. It was screened globally in theatres on 31 January and 4 February 2024.

It was released on Blu-ray disc on 27 February 2026, following a legal dispute which delayed the release and prompted the track "Go West" to be edited out of the film.

== Set lists ==
The following set lists are from the shows in Hull (31 May 2022), Brighton (26 June 2023), Manchester (9 June 2024), Seville (17 June 2025), and Santiago (27 February 2026). They are not intended to represent all shows of the tour.

In 2024, three songs from the new album Nonetheless were included. In 2025 and early 2026, the Village People cover "Go West" was not played due to a legal dispute. The song was restored to the set list in the summer of 2026.

2022
1. "Suburbia"
2. "Can You Forgive Her?"
3. "Opportunities (Let's Make Lots of Money)"
4. "Where the Streets Have No Name (I Can't Take My Eyes Off You)"
5. "Rent"
6. "I Don't Know What You Want but I Can't Give It Any More"
7. "So Hard"
8. "Left to My Own Devices"
9. "Single-Bilingual / Se a vida é (That's the Way Life Is)"
10. "Domino Dancing"
11. "Monkey Business"
12. "New York City Boy"
13. "You Only Tell Me You Love Me When You're Drunk"
14. "Jealousy"
15. "Love Comes Quickly"
16. "Losing My Mind"
17. "Always on My Mind"
18. "Dreamland"
19. "Heart"
20. "What Have I Done to Deserve This?"
21. "It's Alright"
22. "Vocal"
23. "Go West"
24. "It's a Sin"

Encore

1. "West End Girls"
2. "Being Boring"
2023
1. "Suburbia"
2. "Can You Forgive Her?"
3. "Opportunities (Let's Make Lots of Money)"
4. "Where the Streets Have No Name (I Can't Take My Eyes Off You)"
5. "Rent"
6. "I Don't Know What You Want but I Can't Give It Any More"
7. "So Hard"
8. "Left to My Own Devices"
9. "Single-Bilingual / Se a vida é (That's the Way Life Is)"
10. "Domino Dancing"
11. "Monkey Business"
12. "New York City Boy"
13. "Jealousy"
14. "Love Comes Quickly"
15. "Paninaro"
16. "Always on My Mind"
17. "Dreamland"
18. "Heart"
19. "What Have I Done to Deserve This?"
20. "It's Alright"
21. "Vocal"
22. "Go West"
23. "It's a Sin"

Encore

1. "West End Girls"
2. "Being Boring"
2024
1. "Suburbia"
2. "Can You Forgive Her?"
3. "Opportunities (Let's Make Lots of Money)"
4. "Where the Streets Have No Name (I Can't Take My Eyes Off You)"
5. "Rent"
6. "I Don't Know What You Want but I Can't Give It Any More"
7. "So Hard"
8. "Left to My Own Devices"
9. "Single-Bilingual / Se a vida é (That's the Way Life Is)"
10. "Domino Dancing"
11. "Dancing Star"
12. "New York City Boy"
13. "A New Bohemia"
14. "Jealousy"
15. "Loneliness"
16. "Love Comes Quickly"
17. "Paninaro"
18. "Always on My Mind"
19. "Dreamland"
20. "Heart"
21. "What Have I Done to Deserve This?"
22. "It's Alright"
23. "Vocal"
24. "Go West"
25. "It's a Sin"

Encore

1. "West End Girls"
2. "Being Boring"
2025–26
1. "Suburbia"
2. "Can You Forgive Her?"
3. "Opportunities (Let's Make Lots of Money)"
4. "Where the Streets Have No Name (I Can't Take My Eyes Off You)"
5. "Rent"
6. "I Don't Know What You Want but I Can't Give It Any More"
7. "So Hard"
8. "Left to My Own Devices"
9. "Single-Bilingual / Se a vida é (That's the Way Life Is)"
10. "Domino Dancing"
11. "Dancing Star"
12. "New York City Boy"
13. "The Pop Kids"
14. "A New Bohemia"
15. "Jealousy"
16. "Love Comes Quickly"
17. "Paninaro"
18. "Always on My Mind"
19. "Dreamland"
20. "Heart"
21. "What Have I Done to Deserve This?"
22. "It's Alright"
23. "Vocal"
24. "It's a Sin"

Encore

1. "West End Girls"
2. "Being Boring"
2026
1. "Suburbia"
2. "Can You Forgive Her?"
3. "Opportunities (Let's Make Lots of Money)"
4. "Where the Streets Have No Name (I Can't Take My Eyes Off You)"
5. "Rent"
6. "I Don't Know What You Want but I Can't Give It Any More"
7. "So Hard"
8. "Left to My Own Devices"
9. "Single-Bilingual / Se a vida é (That's the Way Life Is)"
10. "Domino Dancing"
11. "Dancing Star"
12. "New York City Boy"
13. "The Pop Kids"
14. "A New Bohemia"
15. "Jealousy"
16. "Love Comes Quickly"
17. "Paninaro"
18. "Always on My Mind"
19. "Dreamland"
20. "Heart"
21. "What Have I Done to Deserve This?"
22. "It's Alright"
23. "Vocal"
24. "Go West"
25. "It's a Sin"

Encore

1. "West End Girls"
2. "Being Boring"

== Tour dates ==
List of concerts, showing date, city, country, venue
Date	City	Country	Venue
Leg #1 – Europe
10 May 2022	Milan	Italy	Teatro degli Arcimboldi
12 May 2022	Vienna	Austria	Planet.tt Bank Austria Halle
14 May 2022	Munich	Germany	Olympiahalle
15 May 2022	Zürich	Switzerland	Hallenstadion
17 May 2022	Brussels	Belgium	Vorst Nationaal
18 May 2022	Amsterdam	Netherlands	AFAS Live
20 May 2022	Manchester	England	AO Arena
22 May 2022	London	England	The O2 Arena
24 May 2022	Cardiff	Wales	Motorpoint Arena Cardiff
25 May 2022	Bournemouth	England	Bournemouth International Centre
27 May 2022	Newcastle	England	Utilita Arena Newcastle
28 May 2022	Birmingham	England	Resorts World Arena
29 May 2022	Glasgow	Scotland	OVO Hydro
31 May 2022	Hull	England	Bonus Arena
2 June 2022	Kværndrup	Denmark	Heartland Festival
4 June 2022	Oberhausen	Germany	Rudolf Weber-Arena
5 June 2022	Hamburg	Germany	Barclays Arena
7 June 2022	Leipzig	Germany	QUARTERBACK Immobilien ARENA
8 June 2022	Prague	Czech Republic	Forum Karlín
10 June 2022	Stuttgart	Germany	Porsche-Arena
11 June 2022	Berlin	Germany	Mercedes-Benz Arena
15 June 2022	Stockholm	Sweden	Avicii Arena
17 June 2022	Oslo	Norway	OverOslo Festival
19 June 2022	Frankfurt	Germany	Jahrhunderthalle
22 June 2022	Cork	Ireland	Live at the Marquee
24 June 2022	London	England	Electric Ballroom
26 June 2022	Glastonbury	England	Glastonbury Festival
30 June 2022	Athens	Greece	Release Athens
6 July 2022	Budapest	Hungary	Budapest Park
9 July 2022	Bilbao	Spain	Bilbao BBK Live
14 July 2022	Tenerife	Spain	Campo De Fútbol El Peñón
16 July 2022	Gran Canaria	Spain	Gran Canaria Arena
Leg #2 – Europe
31 December 2022	Edinburgh	Scotland	Princes Street Gardens
31 May 2023	Barcelona	Spain	Parc del Fòrum (Note: Affiliated with the Primavera Sound festivals.)
4 June 2023	Barcelona	Spain	Sala Apolo
6 June 2023	Madrid	Spain	Joy Eslava
7 June 2023	Madrid	Spain	Estadio Metropolitano
9 June 2023	Porto	Portugal	Parque da Cidade
13 June 2023	Rome	Italy	Parco della Musica
15 June 2023	Paris	France	L'Olympia
17 June 2023	London	England	OVO Arena Wembley
19 June 2023	Dublin	Ireland	3Arena
21 June 2023	Aberdeen	Scotland	P&J Live
23 June 2023	Liverpool	England	M&S Bank Arena
24 June 2023	Leeds	England	First Direct Arena
26 June 2023	Brighton	England	Brighton Centre
28 June 2023	Cornwall	England	Eden Project
1 July 2023	Cologne	Germany	Lanxess Arena
4 July 2023	Helsinki	Finland	Helsinki Ice Hall
7 July 2023	Copenhagen	Denmark	Royal Arena
9 July 2023	Gothenburg	Sweden	Scandinavium
Leg #3 – Latin America
19 November 2023	Mexico City	Mexico	Corona Capital
20 November 2023	Mexico City	Mexico	Teatro Metropólitan
26 November 2023	Buenos Aires	Argentina	Parque Sarmiento
29 November 2023	Santiago	Chile	Movistar Arena
2 December 2023	São Paulo	Brazil	Autódromo de Interlagos
4 December 2023	São Paulo	Brazil	Audio
7 December 2023	Lima	Peru	Multiespacio Costa 21
9 December 2023	Bogotá	Colombia	Movistar Arena
Leg #4 – Europe
26 May 2024	London	England	KOKO
31 May 2024	Santiago de Compostela	Spain	O Son do Camiño
4 June 2024	Glasgow	Scotland	OVO Hydro
6 June 2024	Nottingham	England	Motorpoint Arena Nottingham
8 June 2024	Birmingham	England	Utilita Arena Birmingham
9 June 2024	Manchester	England	Co-op Live
11 June 2024	Belfast	Northern Ireland	SSE Arena
15 June 2024	Calvià	Spain	Mallorca Live Festival
22 June 2024	Newport	England	Isle of Wight Festival
26 June 2024	Amsterdam	Netherlands	AFAS Live
28 June 2024	Mannheim	Germany	SAP Arena
29 June 2024	Hanover	Germany	ZAG-Arena
1 July 2024	Prague	Czech Republic	O2 Universum
3 July 2024	Warsaw	Poland	Arena COS Torwar
6 July 2024	Berlin	Germany	Uber Arena
13 July 2024	Barcelona	Spain	Cruïlla Festival
18 July 2024	Pori	Finland	Pori Jazz
23 July 2024	London	England	Royal Opera House
24 July 2024	London	England	Royal Opera House
25 July 2024	London	England	Royal Opera House
26 July 2024	London	England	Royal Opera House
27 July 2024	London	England	Royal Opera House
6 September 2024	Blackpool	England	Funny Girls
8 September 2024	Preston	England	Radio 2 in the Park
Leg #5 – Europe
17 June 2025	Seville	Spain	Icónica Sevilla Fest
19 June 2025	Lisbon	Portugal	Kalorama Festival
21 June 2025	Madrid	Spain	Kalorama Festival
16 July 2025	Marbella	Spain	Starlite Occident Festival
20 July 2025	Lucca	Italy	Lucca Summer Festival
25 July 2025	Benidorm	Spain	Low Festival
31 July 2025	Cardiff	Wales	Cardiff Castle
2 August 2025	Lokeren	Belgium	Lokerse Feesten
9 August 2025	Gothenburg	Sweden	Way Out West
14 August 2025	Sandringham	England	Royal Sandringham Estate
16 August 2025	Durham	England	Hardwick Festival
30 August 2025	Warwick	England	Warwick Castle
Leg #6 – Asia
6 January 2026	Tokyo	Japan	Tokyo Garden Theater
9 January 2026	Kobe	Japan	World Memorial Hall
Leg #7 – Latin America
23 February 2026	Viña del Mar	Chile	Viña del Mar International Song Festival
27 February 2026	Santiago	Chile	Movistar Arena
28 February 2026	Santiago	Chile	Teatro Caupolicán
3 March 2026	São Paulo	Brazil	Suhai Music Hall
Leg #8 – Europe
20 June 2026	Taranto	Italy	Medimex Festival
24 June 2026	Istanbul	Turkey	Blind Fest
27 June 2026	Athens	Greece	Release Athens
1 July 2026	Paris	France	Zénith Paris
4 July 2026	Lytham St Annes	England	Lytham Festival
7 July 2026	Mantua	Italy	Mantova Summer Festival
10 July 2026	Mönchengladbach	Germany	SparkassenPark
11 July 2026	Berlin	Germany	Waldbühne
23 July 2026	Valencia	Spain	Roig Arena
25 July 2026	Santander	Spain	Magdalena en Vivo Festival
20 August 2026	Oslo	Norway	Unity Arena
22 August 2026	Esbjerg	Denmark	Suset Festival

=== Cancelled dates ===
Date	City	Country	Venue	Reason
13 June 2022	Tallinn	Estonia	Saku Suurhall	Due to unforeseen circumstances.
2 July 2022	Sofia	Bulgaria	Airport Park	Due to unforeseen circumstances.
4 July 2022	Bucharest	Romania	Arenele Romane	Due to unforeseen circumstances.
4 January 2026	Chiba	Japan	Makuhari Messe	Due to illness.

== Personnel ==
Pet Shop Boys

- Neil Tennant – vocals
- Chris Lowe – keyboards

Live band

- Afrika Green – percussion, backing vocals (2022–24)
- Bubba McCarthy – percussion, backing vocals (2025–26)
- Simon Tellier – percussion, guitar, keyboards, backing vocals
- Clare Uchima – keyboards, backing vocals, co-lead vocals on "What Have I Done to Deserve This?"

Directors

- Stuart Price – music producer
- Pete Gleadall – musical director and programmer
- Tom Scutt – creative director, set and costume design
- Lynne Page – stage director
- Luke Halls – video content
- Jenny Rush – video content
- Bruno Poet – lighting director
- Matthew Daw – lighting director
- David Allen – associate set designer
- Frank Strachan – associate costume designer, styling and wardrobe
