= Chasing Sheep Is Best Left to Shepherds =

Musical composition by Michael Nyman

Chasing Sheep is Best Left to Shepherds is a piece of minimalist music from the soundtrack for The Draughtsman's Contract, written by Michael Nyman. In the forty years since its release it has been much quoted and sampled and performed by various ensembles. The main motif of first and third part is based on the Prelude to Act III, Scene 2 of Henry Purcell’s opera, King Arthur, the motif of the middle part is based on the aria Madamina, il catalogo è questo from Wolfgang Amadeus Mozart's opera, Don Giovanni.

== Versions ==
There are different arrangements of this piece, one of which is broadcast on Classic FM TV, performed by the Michael Nyman Band, which was not the original arrangement for the film. Another different version was recorded by Wingates Band and comes from the Album "Nyman Brass". In the original film, the piece was performed much more slowly than re-recorded versions. It did however have a similar arrangement, with a soprano saxophone with the lead melody. In the Wingates Band version, the melody is in the high range of the band. In the Michael Nyman Band version, the bassline is in the piano, played by Michael Nyman himself, playing chords. In the Wingates Band version, it is running quavers in the tuba line.

== In popular culture ==
The theme was used as early as 1984 for the opening sequence and the Rolls-Royce plots in the Jean-Daniel Cadinot movie Sex Drive (Stop Surprise in the original). It is also used in the opening titles of the 2006 film, A Cock and Bull Story.

The Divine Comedy rearranged the piece as the B-side to their 1998 single Generation Sex, performed alongside The Michael Nyman Band.

"Chasing Sheep" was used in an episode of the motoring show Top Gear, during a race from the studio in Dunsfold Park near Guildford to Casino Square, Monte Carlo between an Aston Martin DB9 and the Eurostar/TGV. (Series 4, Episode 1)

An excerpt from the piece was used in a 2002 British TV advertisement for Walkers Crisps, featuring Victoria Beckham and Gary Lineker.

The melody line of the piece is quoted by the Pet Shop Boys on the track Love Is a Bourgeois Construct from their 2013 album Electric.

The intro to the melody was used on the Daft Punk song Veridis Quo, from the album Discovery.

It was the wake-up call music on Flight Day 8 of NASA mission STS-111.

The song is prominently played for the ending credits of the 2015 French film Marguerite.

In the UK, it was often used to open historical features on the BBC current affairs television programme Daily Politics.

The theme was used as an introduction to the band Vampire Weekend at an October 2019 concert at Red Rocks in Morrison, Colorado.
