= The Penelopes =

French band

- Origin: Paris, France
- Genres: Electronic; indie rock; indie pop; dream pop; pop rock
- Labels: Pour Le Monde, Believe
- Members: Axel Basquiat; Vincent T.
- Website: www.thepenelopes.com

The Penelopes (or The pEneLOpe[s]) are a French indie pop/electronic band from Paris, consisting of Axel Basquiat and Vincent T. They have recently relocated to London. Though the band is a duo, they have additional musicians on bass, guitar and drums for live performances. The Penelopes are also award-winning film composers, remixers, producers, and DJs.

== History ==
=== Early years ===
The Penelopes’ danceable indie-pop style developed from a rare creative partnership and longstanding friendship. The duo had known each other since they were children in Northern Paris, discovering music throughout teenage years, listening to bands like Cocteau Twins, New Order and the Cure. In an interview with the Daily Star the band said, "we grew up in a very cosmopolitan but poor suburb. The area was like Manchester. It was rainy and industrial, which might explains why we love dark British music so much". In juxtaposition to this, they told Wonderland Magazine, "the funk, disco, and rap music we heard growing up outside our windows was what influenced our dance approach." This explains why the band often thanks French hip-hop bands such as their neighbours, Suprême NTM, on their albums.

Axel said to Artrocker, "we want to beautify our life. We are searching for a light. We’re not like those spoiled kids who pretend to be dirty to be cool. Our songs are about simple pleasures, about taking a trip, about the great escapes, about all kind of fantasies, about friendship and poverty, about searching for the light."

Vincent went on to study law and Axel studied medicine, one of the reasons being they could stay as students for a longer while to avoid working in offices or factories. The two eventually followed their passion and pursued careers in music. Axel and Vincent formed the Penelopes and started making music in the rock and electro scenes around Paris. The first deal was on DJ Hell's International DeeJay Gigolo Records.

=== Style and influence ===
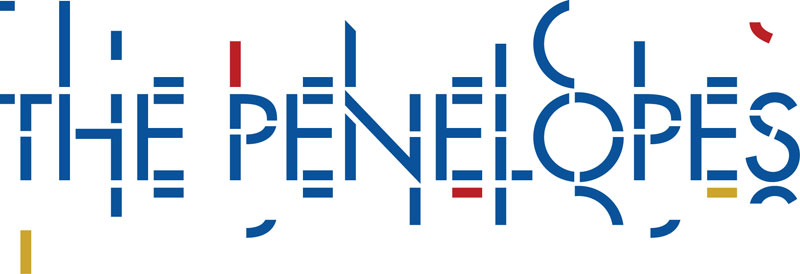
The Penelopes' Logo by Parris Wakefield

The Penelopes' style is a mix of indie and dream pop, combined with disco and electro tight groove, layered with lush and melodies. Their major influences are Cocteau Twins, the Cure, New Order, the Smiths, David Bowie, Joy Division, Devo, and Happy Mondays. The band often mentioned Ride, Slowdive or Prefab Sprout, which Axel considered as a "guilty pleasure". The press often references the Penelopes to Pixies, Daft Punk, M83, and Air.

Axel told Digital Spy about their sound, "It’s a really difficult question – the background of The Penelopes are very rock and very new wave – then we tried to incorporate disco and electronics. It’s disco rock music." And on lyrics, Axel explained, "we like to have twisted lyrics – the lyrics are more twisted than people think. They are more bizarre and we want people to dance to them".

1883 Magazine said about the Penelopes' music, "with swirling layers of lush keyboard, punchy guitars and catchy hooks, their upbeat sound is just how you want to start and end your day". "Spacey and energetic, airy and atmospheric" was the review from This Is Fake DIY.

=== First album: The Arrogance of Simplicity ===
The first album The Arrogance of Simplicity was released under Vitalic's label, Citizen Records. Rock Mag describes it as "a night club with feelings inside". Les Inrockuptibles said "the duo gave their best in the delicate exercise of writing pop songs, with many influences (The Cure for bass lines, Cocteau Twins on "Demian", New Order on "Paddy Will Have His Revenge", even techno on "Teenage Dust")".

The band explained in Wonderland Magazine, "we love post-punk music in general but we didn't want to copy our idols. So we started to explore electronic music alongside rap and other contemporary club music. We made our first album in our bedroom. We were naive and we wanted to experiment with sounds".

The single "Demian" was performed by the former singer of Ekova – Dierdre Dubois. The song refers to Hermann Hesse's book of the same name and was chosen for a Perrier commercial.

=== Side project with DJ Morpheus: Priceless Concrete Echoes ===
Priceless Concrete Echoes is a side project, with major contributions from DJ Morpheus and produced by Black Strobe, released again on Citizen Records. A US version was also released (their debut US release), featuring an alternative track listing. The album was also licensed by Sony BMG in Hong Kong.

The video of the single "Stuck in Lalaland" was featured on Pitchfork, and the same song was remixed by Nouvelle Vague, in which Axel sang in duo with Elli Medeiros. The second single "Licked by Love" was remixed by I Monster. Their cover of the Beastie Boys' "Sabotage" was licensed by Ministry of Sound.

=== Second album: Never Live Another Yesterday ===
The Penelopes relocated from Paris to London in 2012 and formed Pour Le Monde Records. They felt the music scene in UK was more open for their brand of electropop music. They explained to Wonderland Magazine, "In UK, we feel we are different from the other British bands, which is good. We have the same influences and approaches as others but we bring also a disco edge and a very continental electronic approach in our sound".

The album Never Live Another Yesterday has an electro, indie-pop infused sound. The first single was "Now Now Now", followed by "Sally in the Galaxy", and "Summer Life". The album Never Live Another Yesterday was produced by Dan Grech-Marguerat, who also produced for acts such as Scissor Sisters, the Vaccines, Lana Del Rey, and Keane. Ollie Evans from Partizan (Tom Vek, Gossip, Foals, Klaxons) directed the first video "Now Now Now". The video "Sally in the Galaxy" was directed by Saman Keshavarz, who also directed for !!!, Russ Chimes, and Placebo. The singles were remixed by Gigamesh, Viceroy, Miguel Campbell, and the C90s and the "Summer Life" Gigamesh remix reached number 2 on Hype Machine.

The album received great reviews from magazines and blogs such as Artrocker, The Guardian, Clash, Les Inrockuptibles, Harder Blogger Faster, and Topman Generation. The songs were played across national and regional radio stations in the UK, including supports from Chris Hawkins (BBC Radio 6 Music), John Kennedy (XFM), Huw Stephens (BBC Radio 1), and Dermot O'Leary (BBC Radio 2). They also appeared on Channel 4 (Sunday Brunch).

The Penelopes toured with the Human League on their XXXV Tour in Belgium and UK at the end of 2012 (17 shows including the Royal Albert Hall). Digital Spy reviewed, "core pair Axel Basquiat and Vincent T have come to London and are chucking us their latest single 'Now Now Now'. With just that right mixture of eager-to-please grooves and rock star diffidence, the Penelopes feel just one big chorus away from a serious breakthrough. They even managed to make us forget, briefly, that we’re about to see electropop godfathers (and mothers) the Human League".

The band had also played at Liverpool Sound City, the Great Escape Festival, and North by Northeast in 2013.

=== Present ===
In 2023, the Penelopes launched their latest album, Life is Long, a series of duets with iconic French and Italian actresses, including Isabelle Adjani, Nathalie Baye, Asia Argento and Virginie Ledoyen. The album was mastered by Miles Showell (Disclosure, Lana Del Rey, Portishead) and Oli Morgan at London’s iconic Abbey Road Studios.

The Penelopes and Isabelle Adjani premiered the music video for their latest collaboration, The Last Goodbye, in their metaverse. To coincide with this, they created their first three NFTs on the OpenSea marketplace. The three unique versions, the original, a disco remix and a minimalist remix sold out within minutes of their release.

At the 2023 World Soundtrack Awards, the Penelopes were awarded Best Original Score for the Belgian feature film, Spaceboy.

== Sync and remixes ==
These French electro-pop songwriters and producers, living in London, have designed music soundscapes for Prada, agnès b. and Jean-Charles de Castelbajac, composed several soundtracks for the big screen, and are regularly invited to appear at the Cannes Film Festival.

The Penelopes' music is widely used in brands and commercials such as Perrier, Eastpak, Grey Goose, Fitbit and BPI Bank. "Now Now Now" was featured in Electronic Arts' The Sims 3 and sung in Simlish. The song "Licked by Love" was used for trailer for movie Motorway.

Besides their original tracks, the band has also created remixes for Lana Del Rey, David Bowie, Say Lou Lou, the Cure, Alt-J and Pet Shop Boys. The Penelopes were also the only French band invited to play at the Meltdown Festival curated by Robert Smith from The Cure in 2018.

== Live performances ==
Even in their early years, the Penelopes band had already played in many major festivals such as Dour Festival, Sónar, Monegros, Santander, Garorock, Radio France Festival, MoMA PS1, and Transmusicales de Rennes. They had also supported Ladytron, Vitalic, and The Human League among others.

Other than France and UK, they have also played live across the world including Spain, Belgium, Sweden, Germany, Russia, USA, South America, Japan, Hong Kong, Thailand, and Taiwan.

== Discography ==
=== Studio albums ===
- The Arrogance of Simplicity (Citizen Records/Nocturne/P-Vine Records) – CD and digital download.
- Choose: Arrogance, Simplicity or Both (Japan Limited re-release-P-Vine Records) – CD and digital download.
- Priceless Concrete Echoes (Citizen Records/Module) (Side project) - CD and digital download
- Never Live Another Yesterday (Pour Le Monde/Absolute/Universal) – CD and digital download

=== EPs and Singles ===
- Leave Them All Behind (EP) – Vinyl and digital download
- Meet Me by the Gates – The Penelopes and Isabelle Adjani - Vinyl and digital download
- Dream Baby Dream – The Penelopes and Asia Argento - Vinyl and digital download
- Affliction – The Penelopes and Virginie Ledoyen - Digital download

=== Remixes ===
- Lana Del Rey – "Ultraviolence"
- The Cure – "Just Like Heaven"
- Pet Shop Boys – "Love Is a Bourgeois Construct"
- Lana Del Rey – "Brooklyn Baby"
- The Ting Tings – "Do It Again"
- Alt-J – "Hunger of the Pine"
- Tom Tom Club – "You Make Me Rock and Roll"
- David Bowie – "Let's Dance"
- We Have Band – "Modulate"
- Monarchy – "Dancing in the Corner"
- Citizens! – "My Kind of Girl"
- Say Lou Lou x Lindstrøm – "Games for Girls"
- Zoot Woman – "Just a Friend of Mine"
- Starwalker (Jean-Benoît Dunckel of Air and Barði Jóhannsson) – "Holidays"

== Soundtracks ==
- Girlsquad, French television series by Zoé Cauwet
- SpaceBoy, feature by Olivier Pairoux (World Soundtrack Awards Winning)
- The Swimmer, feature by Adam Kalderon
- Bloedgroep, short film by Daan Bunnik (International Film Festival Rotterdam)
- Midnight Kids, documentary by Maxence Vassilyevitch
- Tempus Fugit, short film by Lorenzo Recio (Festival international du film fantastique de Gérardmer)
- Acide, short film by Just Philippot, Canal+ (Sundance Film Festival)
- Puzzle, film by Olivier Pairoux, starring Philippe Katerine
- Atomic Spot, short film by Stéphanie Cabdevila
- Gigot Bitume, short film by Clémence Madeleine-Perdrillat
- Incompresa, feature by Asia Argento, starring Charlotte Gainsbourg (Un Certain Regard / Festival de Cannes)
- La Contribution, short film by Chloe Delaume (Semaine de la critique / Festival de Cannes)
