= Lytham Festival =

Annual music festival in Lancashire, England

- Genre: Music festival
- Frequency: Annually
- Locations: Lytham St Annes, England
- Coordinates: 53.735357°N 2.957525°W
- Years active: 2009–2019, 2022–
- Inaugurated: August 2009
- Founder: Daniel Cuffe; Peter Taylor
- Most recent: 2 July 2025
- Next event: 1 July 2026
- Capacity: Approx. 20,000
- Organiser: Cuffe & Taylor (Live Nation UK)
- Sponsor: TK Maxx
- Website: lythamfestival.com

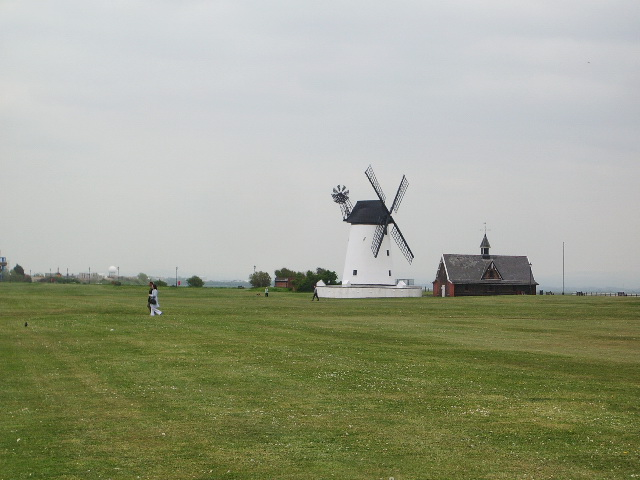
Lytham Green, venue of Lytham Festival, pictured in 2008. Lytham Windmill is pictured in the background

The Lytham Festival (formerly and colloquially Lytham Proms) is an annual five-day music festival held in Lytham St Annes, Lancashire. The festival takes place adjacent to Lytham Windmill on Lytham Green, a strip of grass between the town's coastal road and the River Ribble estuary. In promotion and ticketing, festival organisers refer to the venue as "The Proms Arena". It is usually held in mid-July, with the final night often featuring an evening of orchestral classical music, in the style of a traditional promenade concert. Lytham Festival first took place in 2009, and is operated by Lancashire-based promoter Cuffe & Taylor, owned by Live Nation UK. The festival typically has a capacity of 20,000.

== Festivals and line ups ==
=== 2010s ===
==== 2010 ====
Lytham Proms 2010 was a one-day picnic event held on 21 August 2010, and featured Lesley Garrett accompanied by the Manchester Camerata.

==== 2011 ====
Lytham Proms 2011 took place between 5 August 2012 and 7 August 2012. The event featured headline acts Status Quo, Katherine Jenkins and Boyzone. Unlike previous years, the 2011 festival was held over three nights instead of being a one-day event.

==== 2012 ====
Lytham Proms 2012 took place between 3 August 2012 and 5 August 2012.

3 August 2012	4 August 2012	5 August 2012
Bananarama; Rick Astley; Belinda Carlisle; T'Pau; Toyah; Curiosity Killed the Cat; The Real Thing; Pat Sharp	Alfie Boe	Olly Murs; Diana Vickers; Lonsdale Boys Club; Kurtis Reid

==== 2013 ====
Lytham Proms 2013 took place between 2 August 2013 and 4 August 2013.

2 August 2013	3 August 2013	4 August 2013
Tony Hadley; Jason Donovan; Marc Almond; Heaven 17; Sonia; Altered Images; Odyssey	Russell Watson; Jonathan and Charlotte; The Other Guys; Gary Lovini	Rita Ora; Conor Maynard; Stooshe; Ed Drewett; Charlie Brown; ReConnected; Elyar Fox; Hana Joy

==== 2014 ====
Lytham Proms 2014 took place between 1 August 2014 and 3 August 2014.

1 August 2014	2 August 2014	3 August 2014
Blue; Heather Small; Hue and Cry; Howard Jones; Atomic Kitten; B*Witched; The Christians; China Crisis; Captain Sensible	Tom Jones; Cerys Matthews	The Hallé; Michael Ball; Lesley Garrett; Rhydian Roberts; Kerry Ellis; Tenors of Rock; Lucy-Ella

==== 2015 ====
Lytham Festival 2015 took place between 6 August 2015 and 9 August 2015. It was the first festival to be branded under the "Lytham Festival" name, as Cuffe & Taylor wanted to depart from the promenade concert theme and incorporate acts other than classical artists.

6 August 2015	7 August 2015	8 August 2015	9 August 2015
Faithless; Pendulum	Billy Ocean; Five; Jimmy Somerville; Chesney Hawkes; Sinitta; East 17; Vengaboys	McBusted; Karen Harding; HomeTown	Elaine Paige; Marti Pellow; Jonathan Antoine; Laura Wright; Royal Philharmonic Orchestra

==== 2016 ====
Lytham Festival 2016 took place between 4 August 2016 and 7 August 2016. American band Earth, Wind & Fire were originally set to perform alongside The Village People, however their appearance was cancelled. Group Sister Sledge were chosen to replace Earth, Wind & Fire.

4 August 2016	5 August 2016	6 August 2016	7 August 2016
Noel Gallagher's High Flying Birds; Clint Boon; Reverend and the Makers; Jeff Wootton	The Village People; Sister Sledge; Bay City Rollers; Liberty X; Toploader; 911; Five Star	Bryan Adams; The Dunwells	Lea Salonga; Ramin Karimloo; Collabro; Ruthie Henshall; Jodie Prenger; Lucie-Mae Sumner

==== 2017 ====
Lytham Festival 2017 took place between 2 August 2017 and 6 August 2017.

2 August 2017	3 August 2017	4 August 2017	5 August 2017	6 August 2017
Olly Murs; Louisa Johnson	Haçienda Classical (DJ set curated by Graeme Park and Mike Pickering); Manchester Camerata; DJ Woody; 808 State	The Human League; Midge Ure; Living in a Box; Johnny Hates Jazz; Dodgy; Betty Boo; Technotronic; A1; Pat Sharp	Madness; The Tailormade; The Soul Convicts	Collabro; Lea Salonga; Ruthie Henshall; Jodie Prenger; Claire Sweeney; Beau Dermott; Marti Pellow; Jon Lee; Lucie-Mae Sumner

==== 2018 ====
Lytham Festival 2018 took place between 18 July 2018 and 22 July 2018.

18 July 2018	19 July 2018	20 July 2018	21 July 2018	22 July 2018
Steps; Whigfield; Vengaboys; Pat Sharp	Pete Tong; Heritage Orchestra; Basement Jaxx	George Ezra; Emeli Sandé; Rae Morris	Nile Rodgers & Chic; Bananarama; Soul II Soul	Il Divo; Martine McCutcheon

==== 2019 ====
Lytham Festival 2019 took place between 10 July 2019 and 14 July 2019, and was the 10th anniversary of the festival.

10 July 2019	11 July 2019	12 July 2019	13 July 2019	14 July 2019
The Human League; Heather Small; China Crisis	Stereophonics; Tom Grennan; Jade Bird	Kylie Minogue; Sophie Ellis-Bextor; Ana Matronic	Rod Stewart; Wet Wet Wet; Joanne Shaw Taylor	Michael Ball; Sheridan Smith

=== 2020s ===
==== 2020 and 2021 ====
Lytham Festival 2020 was originally announced in late 2019, with the headline acts being Westlife, Lewis Capaldi, Snow Patrol, Lionel Richie and Little Mix. In April 2020, the event was confirmed to be cancelled due to the COVID-19 pandemic in England.

Lytham Festival 2021 was originally announced in late 2020, with the headline acts being Lewis Capaldi, Snow Patrol, Lionel Richie and Duran Duran. On March 26, 2021, the festival was announced to be cancelled due to the COVID-19 pandemic, with organisers confirming that the headline acts would be rebooked for Lytham Festival 2022.

==== 2022 ====
In July 2021, Fylde Borough Council granted the tournament organisers a "one year only" license to run Lytham Festival for ten nights in 2022, rather than the usual five nights. This was due to the 2020 and 2021 festivals being canceled due to the COVID-19 pandemic. The full lineup for Lytham Festival 2022 was confirmed in March 2022. The festival ran from 28 June 2022 to 10 July 2022.

In February 2022, Lionel Richie pulled out of the festival, and was replaced with Nile Rodgers & Chic. On 29 June, Lytham Festival announced that Kodaline had withdrawn from supporting Snow Patrol and were to be replaced by Maxïmo Park. On 9 July 2022, a few hours before their performance, headliners Tears for Fears withdrew from the festival due to Curt Smith "injuring his rib". Opening acts Natalie Imbruglia and Alison Moyet still performed.

Part 1
28 June 2022	29 June 2022	30 June 2022	1 July 2022	2 July 2022
Diana Ross; Jack Savoretti; Cassidy Janson; Raven Mandella	Lewis Capaldi; JP Saxe; Luke La Volpe	Snow Patrol; Maxïmo Park (Note: Replaced one of Snow Patrol's original opening acts, Kodaline.); Jade Bird	Duran Duran; Goldfrapp; Walt Disco; Katie Owen	Nile Rodgers & Chic (Note: Replaced original headline act, Lionel Richie, due to Richie having concerns over the COVID-19 pandemic.); TLC; Soul II Soul; Craig Charles

Part 2
6 July 2022	7 July 2022	8 July 2022	9 July 2022	10 July 2022
Simply Red; Lisa Stansfield; Marisha Wallace	Elbow; Richard Hawley; Badly Drawn Boy	The Strokes; Fontaines D.C.; Wet Leg; The Lounge Society	~~Tears for Fears~~ (Note: Pulled out hours before their performance due to Curt Smith "injuring his rib".); Alison Moyet; Natalie Imbruglia	Paul Weller; The Charlatans; The Lottery Winners; Nia Wyn

==== 2023 ====
Lytham Festival 2023 took place between 28 June 2023 and 2 July 2023. The first acts were announced on 20 October 2022, a co-headlining performance by rock bands Mötley Crüe and Def Leppard on the final night of the festival.

28 June 2023	29 June 2023	30 June 2023	1 July 2023	2 July 2023
Jamiroquai; Jake Shears; Fun Lovin' Criminals; Stone Foundation	George Ezra; Cat Burns; The Big Moon; Kingfishr	Sting; Blondie; Kaiser Chiefs; Germein; Joe Sumner	Lionel Richie; Gabrielle; Kim Wilde; Kevin Davy White	Mötley Crüe; Def Leppard; Vivas

==== 2024 ====
Lytham Festival 2024 occurred between 3 July and 7 July 2024. The first headliner, Manchester-based band Courteeners, was announced in November 2023.

3 July 2024	4 July 2024	5 July 2024	6 July 2024	7 July 2024
Hozier; Brittany Howard; Lord Huron; Ye Vagabonds	Shania Twain; Rag'n'Bone Man; Delta Goodrem	Courteeners; The Kooks; Nieve Ella	Madness; Rick Astley; The Lightning Seeds; Kid Kapichi	James (Orchestral Set); Johnny Marr; Inspiral Carpets; The Magic Numbers; The Kairos

==== 2025 ====
Lytham Festival 2025 took place between 2 July and 6 July 2025. Stevie Wonder was announced as the festival's final headliner on 17 March 2025. On 28 May, it was announced that Kings of Leon were cancelling their performance, due to lead singer Caleb Followill sustaining a severe injury to his foot, which resulted in all their summer festival dates being cancelled; the festival subsequently announced they would reduce to a four-day event, refunding the difference for 5-day pass holders. The Friday event, due to be headlined by Alanis Morissette, was cancelled shortly after the doors opened, due to safety concerns over the weather. The event had previously been pushed forward due to the same concerns. Organisers announced there would be a full refund, but were criticised over the lateness of the cancellation, and delaying to put a statement out on social media after it was cancelled.

2 July 2025	3 July 2025	4 July 2025	5 July 2025	6 July 2025
~~Kings of Leon~~; ~~Manic Street Preachers~~; ~~Jake Bugg~~	Stevie Wonder; Corinne Bailey Rae	~~Alanis Morissette~~; ~~Train~~; ~~Liz Phair~~; ~~The Lottery Winners~~	Justin Timberlake; Jess Glynne; Dagny; Ctrl	Simple Minds & Texas; Cast; The Alarm; Pete Waterman (DJ Set)

==== 2026 ====
Lytham Festival 2026 took place between 1 July and 5 July 2026. On 29 September 2025, the first headliner was announced to be American musician Teddy Swims performing on the first night of the festival. Pet Shop Boys headlined the fourth night, performing their Dreamworld: The Greatest Hits Live set.

1 July 2026	2 July 2026	3 July 2026	4 July 2026	5 July 2026
Teddy Swims; Lauren Spencer Smith; Jordan Rekei	Alanis Morissette; Skunk Anansie; Pale Waves; The Big Moon	Michael Bublé; Ronan Keating; Appleton; Graham Liver (DJ set)	Pet Shop Boys; Scissor Sisters; Dave Pearce (DJ set)	Pitbull; Lil Jon; Tinchy Stryder; DJ Laz (DJ set); PBH (DJ set)

==== 2027 ====
Lytham Festival 2027 is scheduled to take place between 30 June 2027 and 5 July 2027. The first headliner, Robbie Williams was announced on 20 July 2026, set to perform on the Saturday of the 2027 festival.

30 June 2027	1 July 2027	2 July 2027	3 July 2027	4 July 2027
Kings of Leon; Bastille	TBA	Fatboy Slim; Becky Hill	Robbie Williams	The Corrs; David Gray; James Morrison; Emily Rhodes
