= Dreamland (Pet Shop Boys song) =

Single by Pet Shop Boys featuring Years & Years

from the album Hotspot
- B-side: "An Open Mind"; "No Boundaries"
- Released: 11 September 2019
- Studio: Hansa (Berlin); Record Plant (Los Angeles)
- Genre: Synth-pop
- Length: 3:28
- Label: x2
- Songwriters: Chris Lowe; Neil Tennant; Olly Alexander
- Producer: Stuart Price

Pet Shop Boys singles chronology
"Undertow" (2017)	"Dreamland" (2019)	"Burning the Heather" (2019)

Years & Years singles chronology
"Valentino" (2019)	"Dreamland" (2019)	"It's a Sin" (2021)

Music video
- "Dreamland" (lyric video) on YouTube

"Dreamland" is a song by English synth-pop duo Pet Shop Boys featuring English synth-pop band Years & Years. It was released on 11 September 2019 as the lead single from Pet Shop Boys' fourteenth studio album, Hotspot (2020).

The release of the single coincided with the announcement of Pet Shop Boys' first ever greatest hits tour, titled Dreamworld: The Greatest Hits Live. The tour was postponed due to the COVID-19 pandemic, finally getting underway in May 2022.

== Background and recording ==
"Dreamland" was written in early 2017 by Chris Lowe, Neil Tennant, and Olly Alexander at the Pet Shop Boys' London studio. The collaboration was proposed by Alexander's record label, Polydor, during a meeting with the Pet Shop Boys' manager.

The music was based on a backing track that Lowe had written earlier. The title of the track came when Alexander told the duo that he had just visited the Dreamland Margate amusement park. In an interview with The Guardian, Alexander explained, "I felt like I didn't want to write about politics simply because I felt like I should but then last week I wrote a song with the Pet Shop Boys. It's inspired by a fairground in Margate called Dreamland, but while I was writing it, Neil Tennant said to me, 'This makes sense right now with Trump closing the borders.' The song became something that touched on what's going on in the world. I'd write lyrics and he'd say, 'No, it needs to be more direct.' He'd take a simple line and interject a subversive political statement. That's the challenge as a pop writer, to do both at once".

"Dreamland" was originally intended for a Years & Years album, but they decided it was better suited for a Pet Shop Boys release. Alexander re-recorded his vocals for the song's inclusion on Hotspot. The track was produced by Stuart Price at Hansa Studios in Berlin and the Record Plant in Los Angeles.

Pet Shop Boys stated: "It's so exciting that our new single is a collaboration with Years & Years, one of the most original and successful bands to emerge this decade, and we really enjoyed writing and recording it with Olly Alexander". Alexander added, "It was a dream come true to create something with two of my heroes, and spending time with Chris and Neil was an absolute joy. I had to pinch myself repeatedly!"

== Release ==
"Dreamland" was released as a digital download on 11 September 2019, along with the news that a new Pet Shop Boys album was forthcoming in January 2020. On 25 October, an expanded package was issued on CD, digital, and 12-inch vinyl formats, with remixes of "Dreamland" and two new songs: "No Boundaries", from the play My Beautiful Laundrette, and "An Open Mind".

"Dreamland" did not place on the UK Singles Chart. It debuted at number one on the UK Physical Singles and Vinyl Singles charts, and it peaked at number six on the Billboard Dance Club Songs chart in the United States.

The lyric video for "Dreamland" features imagery of a U-Bahn (underground railway) station in Berlin.

== Critical reception ==
Robin Bacior of Consequence of Sound described "Dreamland" as "a silky synth-pop track full of subtle hooks and cyclical build-ups. The duet moves between the UK duo's Neil Tennant and Years & Years' Olly Alexander, and the trade-offs are flawless". Stephen Daw of Billboard called the single "a glittering pop-disco production", and Daniel Megarry of Gay Times said it was "a slice of synth-pop perfection".

== Live performances ==
During their headline slot at Radio 2 Live in Hyde Park, Pet Shop Boys performed "Dreamland" live for the first time with Years & Years frontman Olly Alexander joining them on stage. The Pet Shop Boys subsequently appeared as guests on Alexander's New Years & Years Eve special broadcast on BBC1, where they performed both "Dreamland" and "It's a Sin". Alexander later joined the Pet Shop Boys for a performance of the song at the 2022 Glastonbury Festival.

== Track listings ==
"Dreamland" is written by Chris Lowe, Neil Tennant, and Olly Alexander. All other tracks are by Tennant/Lowe.

- CD single
1. "Dreamland" – 3:30
2. "An Open Mind" – 3:52
3. "No Boundaries" – 3:38
4. "Dreamland" (PSB remix) – 4:42
5. "Dreamland" (TWD vocal remix) – 5:06
- Digital single
1. "Dreamland" – 3:28
2. "An Open Mind" – 3:52
3. "No Boundaries" – 3:40
- Digital EP – Remixes
1. "Dreamland" (PSB remix) – 4:41
2. "Dreamland" (TWD vocal remix) – 5:06
3. "Dreamland" (TWD dub) – 4:58
4. "Dreamland" (Jacques Renault remix) – 5:45
- 12-inch single

A1. "Dreamland" – 3:30
A2. "Dreamland" (PSB remix) – 5:03
B1. "Dreamland" (TWD vocal remix) – 4:56
B2. "Dreamland" (TWD dub) – 5:44

== Personnel ==
Credits adapted from the liner notes of Hotspot and "Dreamland".

Pet Shop Boys

- Chris Lowe
- Neil Tennant

Additional musicians

- Years & Years – featured artist

Technical personnel

- Stuart Price – production, mixing
- Pete Gleadall – additional engineering
- Tim Young – mastering
- Andy Baldwin – mastering

Artwork

- Farrow – design, art direction
- Pet Shop Boys – design, art direction
- JVP – photography

== Charts ==
Chart performance for "Dreamland"
Chart (2019)	Peak position
Scotland Singles (OCC)	11
UK Singles Downloads (OCC)	26
UK Indie (OCC)	19
US Dance Club Songs (Billboard)	6
US Hot Dance/Electronic Songs (Billboard)	21
