= Agenda (EP) =

2019 EP by Pet Shop Boys

EP by Pet Shop Boys
- Released: 8 February 2019 (digital download) 1 April 2019 (CD, 12" vinyl)
- Genre: Synth-pop
- Length: 13:08
- Label: x2
- Producer: Tim Powell, Pet Shop Boys

Pet Shop Boys chronology
Super (2016)	Agenda (2019)	Inner Sanctum (2019)

Agenda is an EP by English synth-pop duo Pet Shop Boys, released digitally on 8 February 2019 and released physically on 12-inch vinyl in April 2019. A CD edition was only available to those who ordered the 2019 edition of Annually, the Pet Shop Boys' once-a-year publication.

== Background and composition ==
Agenda includes four songs with political themes that did not fit on the next Pet Shop Boys album, Hotspot (2020). The Guardian described them as "the angriest songs the Pet Shop Boys have ever recorded", and Neil Tennant admitted the intention was to "wind people up". The first three songs are satirical, and the fourth, "The Forgotten Child", is a sad ballad.

"Give Stupidity a Chance" is about modern politicians, with lyrics that allude to statements by Michael Gove and Donald Trump. The phrase "We've had quite enough of experts and their dealings" echoes Gove's assertion, in support of Vote Leave on the Brexit referendum, that people "have had enough of experts". The line "Chicks are always up for it, you've got to grab whatever you can" recalls Trump's lewd remarks on the 2005 Access Hollywood tape.

"On Social Media" is a sarcastic song about the effects of online public discourse. The accompanying video displays the lyrics as a Twitter thread between Pet Shop Boys and other accounts, animated on a smartphone screen. "What Are We Going to Do About the Rich?" is a mock-protest song dealing with the extremely wealthy who avoid paying taxes. "The Forgotten Child" tells the story of a refugee child who goes missing while fleeing to safety, linked to the notion "that maybe we've all forgotten something about human values. That maybe there's something being lost, and it's summed up by the idea of the innocence of the child."

== Track listing ==
All tracks are written by Neil Tennant and Chris Lowe.

1. "Give Stupidity a Chance" – 2:59
2. "On Social Media" – 3:33
3. "What Are We Going to Do About the Rich?" – 3:03
4. "The Forgotten Child" – 3:33

== Personnel ==
Credits adapted from the liner notes of Agenda.

Pet Shop Boys

- Chris Lowe
- Neil Tennant

Additional musicians

- Tim Powell – additional keyboards
- Sandy Buglass – guitars

Technical personnel

- Tim Powell – production
- Pet Shop Boys – production
- Jeremy Wheatley – mixing
- Tim Young – mastering
- Pete Gleadall – additional engineering

Artwork

- Farrow/PSB – design, art direction
