= Love Is a Bourgeois Construct =

Single by Pet Shop Boys

from the album Electric
- B-side: "Entschuldigung!"; "Get It Online"
- Released: 2 September 2013
- Genre: Hi-NRG
- Length: 6:41
- Label: x2
- Songwriters: Neil Tennant; Chris Lowe; Henry Purcell
- Producer: Stuart Price

Pet Shop Boys singles chronology
"Vocal" (2013)	"Love Is a Bourgeois Construct" (2013)	"Thursday" (2013)

Music video
- "Love Is a Bourgeois Construct" (audio) on YouTube

"Love Is a Bourgeois Construct" is a song by English synth-pop duo Pet Shop Boys from their twelfth studio album, Electric (2013). It was released on 2 September 2013 as the album's third single. The song is based on the instrumental "Chasing Sheep Is Best Left to Shepherds" (1982), a minimalist piece by Michael Nyman, which in turn is based on the Prelude to Act III, Scene 2 of the opera King Arthur (1691) by Henry Purcell.

The Guardian named "Love Is a Bourgeois Construct" the fourth best track of the year, and Slant Magazine listed the song at number 18 on its "25 Best Singles of 2013" list.

== Background and recording ==
"Love Is a Bourgeois Construct" was written in 2012 in Berlin after the completion of the Pet Shop Boys' album Elysium earlier that year. Chris Lowe had the idea to write music inspired by "Chasing Sheep Is Best Left to Shepherds". Neil Tennant came up with the title based on a passage from the novel Nice Work by David Lodge, about a plant manager who falls in love with a feminist university lecturer.

"I've been in love with you for weeks."

"There's no such thing," she says. "It's a rhetorical device. It's a bourgeois fallacy."

"Haven't you ever been in love, then?"

"When I was younger," she says, "I allowed myself to be constructed by the discourse of romantic love for a while, yes."

For the song, Tennant imagined a middle-class man who was living a comfortable life, until his partner left him and his bourgeois lifestyle became meaningless. The lyrics make reference to the writings of Karl Marx, from the narrator's university days, and to Labour Party politician Tony Benn, who was known for his tea-drinking habit.

The songs on Electric were recorded and sequenced in alphabetical order; the demo was originally called Bourgeois, so it followed Bolshy. When the song was recorded for the album, producer Stuart Price used the sheet music from Purcell's work.

== Release ==
The single was released digitally on 2 September 2013 in two bundles, followed by a CD single on 30 September. Both the physical and digital formats include remixes by Little Boots, The Penelopes and Dave Audé, as well as two previously unreleased B-sides, "Entschuldigung!" and "Get It Online". The twelve-inch single was released on 9 December 2013.

=== Artwork ===
The single cover artwork consists solely of the song title in a constructivist typeface. Inner sleeves of the CD and 12-inch feature quotes from the lyrics in the same style.

Pet Shop Boys decided not to make a music video for "Love Is a Bourgeois Construct" because they felt it would require an extravagant scenario and they didn't like any of the treatments that were proposed.

== Live performances ==
"Love Is a Bourgeois Construct" was performed on select dates of the Electric Tour, with scenes of the Goldhawk Road in London, mentioned in the lyrics, as a backdrop. The song was played regularly during the Super Tour, and it is included on the live album Inner Sanctum, which was recorded during the Pet Shop Boys' residency at the Royal Opera House in July 2018.

== Track listings ==
Digital bundle 1
No.	Title	Length
1.	"Love Is a Bourgeois Construct" (Nighttime radio edit)	4:10
2.	"Entschuldigung!"	5:03
3.	"Get It Online"	3:36
4.	"Love Is a Bourgeois Construct" (The Penelopes remix radio edit)	4:09

Digital bundle 2
No.	Title	Length
1.	"Love Is a Bourgeois Construct" (The Penelopes remix)	7:00
2.	"Love Is a Bourgeois Construct" (Claptone remix)	7:00
3.	"Love Is a Bourgeois Construct" (Little Boots Discothèque edit)	6:50
4.	"Love Is a Bourgeois Construct" (Dave Audé Big Dirty dub)	6:16
5.	"Love Is a Bourgeois Construct" (Claptone instrumental)	6:57

CD single
No.	Title	Length
1.	"Love Is a Bourgeois Construct" (Nighttime radio edit)	4:10
2.	"Entschuldigung!"	5:03
3.	"Get It Online"	3:36
4.	"Love Is a Bourgeois Construct" (The Penelopes remix)	7:00
5.	"Love Is a Bourgeois Construct" (Claptone remix)	7:00
6.	"Love Is a Bourgeois Construct" (Little Boots Discothèque edit)	6:50
7.	"Love Is a Bourgeois Construct" (Dave Audé Big Dirty dub)	6:16
8.	"Love Is a Bourgeois Construct" (Claptone instrumental)	6:57
9.	"Love Is a Bourgeois Construct" (Little Boots Discothèque dub)	6:50

12-inch single
No.	Title	Length
1.	"Love Is a Bourgeois Construct" (album version)	6:42
2.	"Love Is a Bourgeois Construct" (The Penelopes remix)	7:00
3.	"Love Is a Bourgeois Construct" (Claptone remix)	7:00
4.	"Love Is a Bourgeois Construct" (Little Boots Discothèque dub)	6:51
5.	"Love Is a Bourgeois Construct" (Dave Audé extended vocal remix)	6:47
6.	"Love Is a Bourgeois Construct" (Claptone instrumental)	6:57
7.	"Love Is a Bourgeois Construct" (Dave Audé Big Dirty dub instrumental)	6:17
8.	"Love Is a Bourgeois Construct" (The Penelopes dub)	7:04

== Personnel ==
Credits adapted from the liner notes of Electric and "Love Is a Bourgeois Construct".

On the album, a songwriting credit for "Love Is a Bourgeois Construct" is given to Henry Purcell in addition to Tennant and Lowe; whereas on the single, Michael Nyman is credited instead of Purcell, and his music publisher, Chester Music, is also listed.

Pet Shop Boys

- Neil Tennant
- Chris Lowe

Additional vocals

- Stuart Price
- Andy Crookston
- Pete Gleadall
- Luke Halls

== Charts ==
Chart performance for "Love Is a Bourgeois Construct"
Chart (2013)	Peak position
UK Singles (OCC)	105
UK Indie (Official Charts)	18
US Dance Club Songs (Billboard)	38
US Dance Singles Sales (Billboard)	1
US Hot Singles Sales (Billboard)	4
