= Õllesummer =

Beer festival in Tallinn, Estonia

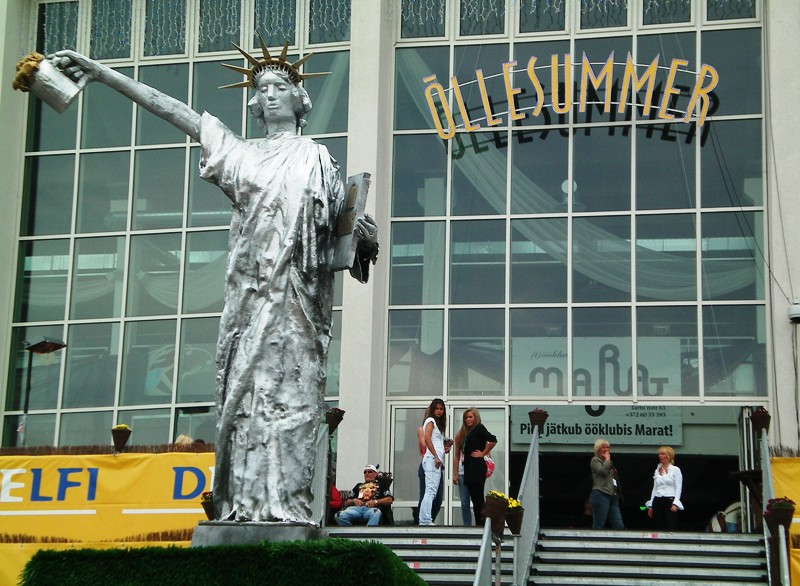
Statue for Õllesummer (2009)

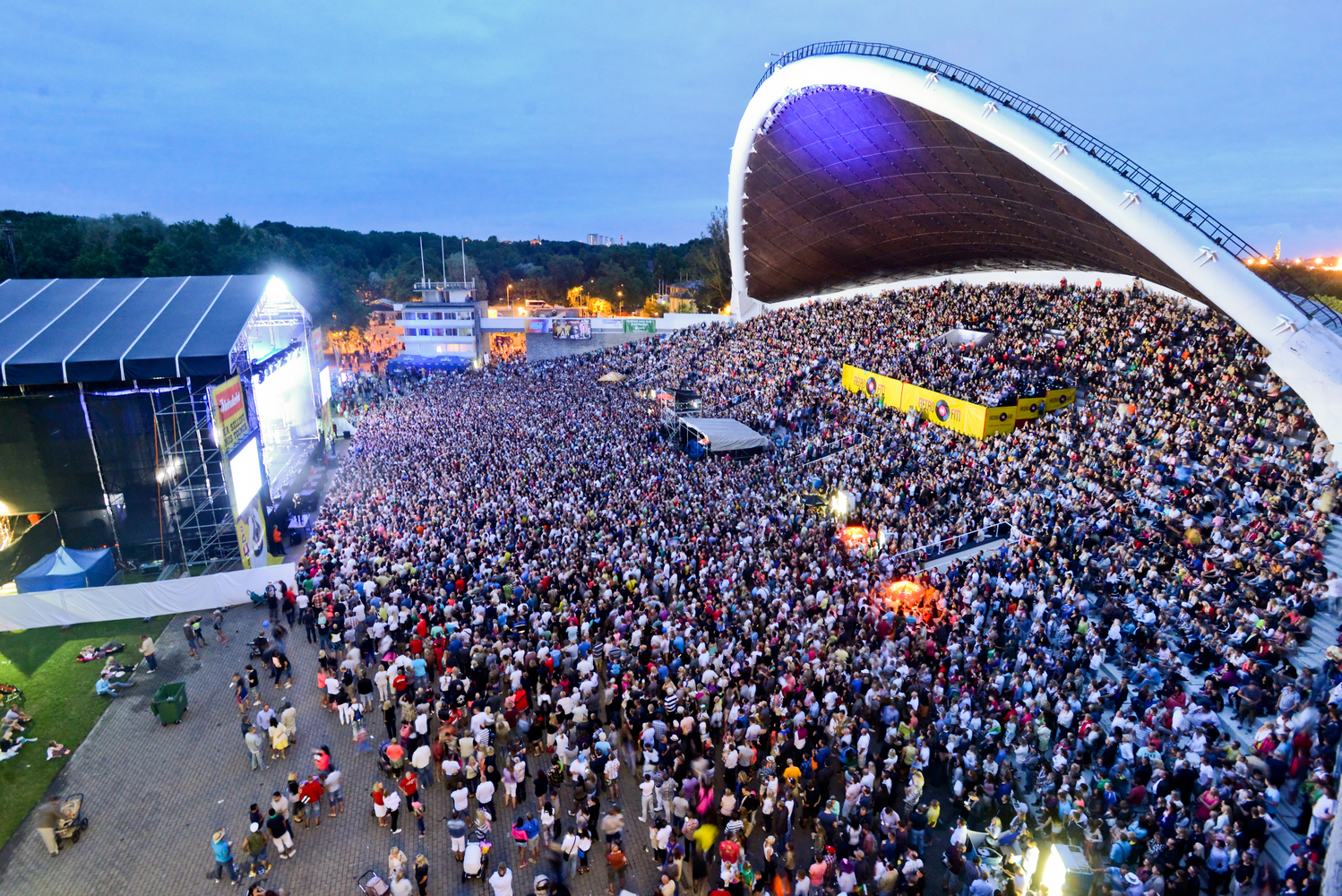
Õllesummer (2013)

Õllesummer is a beer festival, which is held in Tallinn, Estonia. This festival was the biggest beer festival in Nordic countries. The festival took place from 1990's until 2018. After a five-year hiatus, the festival took place again in 2024.

The first festival took place in 1994. Since 1996, the festival location was Tallinn Song Festival Grounds.

During the festival, beer tents and several arenas were set up. Main arena was to be called arena "Postimees" and there were performed Estonian musicians.

Every year, about 80,000 people visited the festival.

Beer summer 2014 took place from 9 to 12 until July at the Tallinn Song Square. During four days, over a hundred Estonian and foreign artists performed on seven stages.
