= Left to My Own Devices =

1988 single by Pet Shop Boys

Single by Pet Shop Boys

from the album Introspective
- B-side: "The Sound of the Atom Splitting"
- Released: 14 November 1988
- Studio: Advision (London, England) (Note: Vocals recording); Sarm West (London, England); Abbey Road (London, England) (Note: Orchestra recording)
- Genre: Synth-pop; dance-pop; orchestral pop
- Length: 8:16 (album version); 4:43 (7-inch)
- Label: Parlophone
- Songwriters: Chris Lowe; Neil Tennant
- Producers: Trevor Horn; Stephen Lipson

Pet Shop Boys singles chronology
"Domino Dancing" (1988)	"Left to My Own Devices" (1988)	"It's Alright" (1989)

Alternative cover
- 12-inch single cover

"Left to My Own Devices" is a song by English synth-pop duo Pet Shop Boys, released in November 1988 by Parlophone as the second single from their third studio album, Introspective (1988). It is the first track of the album. The song fared better than the album's lead single, "Domino Dancing", charting three positions higher on the UK Singles Chart, at number four. It was the first song that Pet Shop Boys recorded with an orchestra, arranged by Richard Niles. Since its release, it has become a staple of Pet Shop Boys' live performances. Eric Watson directed its music video.

== Background and composition ==
"Left to My Own Devices" was written because Pet Shop Boys wanted to work with producer Trevor Horn and they needed a song to record. The day before their meeting with Horn, they made a demo at Abbey Road Studios of an instrumental by Chris Lowe, with a line Neil Tennant came up with, "left to my own devices I probably would". Tennant finished the lyrics a few days later, and explained his process:

That's when I realised what the song was about – that this person goes through life always doing what he wanted to do. I liked the idea of writing a really up pop song about being left alone.

... The song is a day in the life of someone, so it starts off with getting out of bed and being on the phone and drinking tea and all the rest of it, and it ends up with coming home. ... By this time I was making the words very exaggerated and camp, though writing a book and going on stage were both things I had wanted to do when I was young.

Tennant called the song an exaggerated autobiography. He included a childhood reminiscence of being "in a world of my own at the back of the garden" playing with toy soldiers at his family home in Newcastle, although he actually pretended to be a Cavalier instead of "a Roundhead general" as in the song. The "party animal" on the phone was Tennant's friend Jon Savage. The line "It's not a crime" is taken from a Pet Shop Boys song of the same name written in 1982 that was released in 2024. Trevor Horn was the source of the phrase "Debussy to a disco beat", which Tennant paired with Che Guevara "to combine revolution with beauty".

== Recording and release ==
"Left to My Own Devices" was produced by Trevor Horn and Stephen Lipson. Lipson took the Pet Shop Boys' demo, which had a Motown sound, and added the popular house music influence of the time. The song opens with mezzo-soprano Sally Bradshaw singing the word "house".

An orchestra was recorded at Abbey Road, arranged and conducted by Richard Niles. Pet Shop Boys had not worked with an orchestra before and they were initially taken aback by the arrangement; Lowe in particular felt it was too much. The arrangement was pared down, but they retained most of it on the track and continued to work with Niles on future projects.

The album version includes a long outro in which fragments of the main song lyrics are cut into a different order, such as "Che Guevara's drinking tea".

As with the other tracks on Introspective, it has a longer version on the album and was edited down to become more radio-friendly when released as a single. This is mainly due to Pet Shop Boys wanting to be different from other artists at the time. Tennant stated:

It was quite exciting to plan the songs as long because we had been so disciplined at making four-minute pop singles, with the exception of "It's a Sin", which is five minutes. The idea also was to have an album where every track was a single.

The "Disco" mix on the 12-inch and CD singles was made by Horn and Lipson along with Robin Hancock. Additional remixes of "Left to My Own Devices" were made by Frankie Knuckles and Shep Pettibone.

=== Super version ===
In April 2017, Pet Shop Boys released a new version of "Left to My Own Devices" as a bonus track on the single "Undertow" from their 2016 album Super. It was produced by Stuart Price and was based on the live performance of the song during their Super Tour, featuring tour musicians Afrika Green, Christina Hizon, and Simon Tellier on backing vocals, keyboards, and percussion.

== Critical reception ==
Miranda Sawyer from Smash Hits named "Left to My Own Devices" Single of the Fortnight, writing, "Pop perfection from the winsome twosome. Complete with swank orchestra, this massive stomper galumphs away at a breakneck pace into all sorts of dramatic twists and turns, over which Neil's deadpan vocals sound brilliantly menacing. [...] A storming chorus plus! — plus! — one of those superbly pretentious talking bits Neil does, rounded off with a breathtaking violin swoosh, must ensure that this soars to the top of the charts and stays there for weeks and weeks. A truly awe-inspiring Single of the Fortnight."

== Artwork ==
The cover photos were taken by Michael Roberts, who was fashion editor at Tatler at the time. The 7-inch single showed Tennant and Lowe wearing pieces of medieval armour, with a bicycle wheel suspended over their heads. The cover designer, Mark Farrow, thought the photos were pretentious so he created a yellow outer sleeve, resembling a manila envelope, to cover them.

== Music video ==
The accompanying music video for "Left to My Own Devices", directed by longtime Pet Shop Boys director Eric Watson, primarily consists of Tennant and Lowe dancing on an invisible glass floor, with the camera angle facing upwards. Tennant and Lowe are joined by several acrobats who are also seen from the same camera angle. At one point, balloons are also visible.

Watson had used a similar technique, filming through layers of perspex, on the video for "Breakaway" by the Australian band Big Pig, but Pet Shop Boys were not happy with the result. Watson recalled, "I thought I'd pulled it off, but they were furious because it was so dark".

== Live performances ==
Pet Shop Boys performed "Left to My Own Devices" on their first tour in 1989, with Tennant dressed in pyjamas and a dressing gown in reference to the opening line, "I get out of bed at half past ten". On the Discovery Tour (1994), the song was played in a medley with Corona's "The Rhythm of the Night" (1993), sung by backing vocalist Katie Kissoon. The performance is included on the live album and film Discovery: Live in Rio 1994. "Left to My Own Devices" was performed on the Nightlife Tour (1999–2000) and was included in the concert film Montage. The song also appears on the live album, Concrete (2006), with opera singer Sally Bradshaw reprising her vocals, backed by the BBC Concert Orchestra. The live album and film Pandemonium features the song paired with "Closer to Heaven" (1999), as performed on the Pandemonium Tour (2009–10). The new version of "Left to My Own Devices" for the Super Tour (2016–19)—with the original orchestrations replaced with synthesizers and lively percussion, and featuring dancers in inflatable balloon costumes—appears on the live album and film Inner Sanctum (2019). The hit song was also included on the set list of the Dreamworld: The Greatest Hits Live tour, launched in 2022.

== Usage in other media ==
Turkey's longest-running weekly video-music programme Pop Saati (lit. Pop Hour) on TRT begins with the intro of the song.

In 2024, the song was used in a television commercial titled "Clocking Off" for the British telecommunications company EE, depicting people leaving a drab workplace for a vibrant home life.

== Track listings ==
"Left to My Own Devices" is written by Chris Lowe and Neil Tennant; "The Sound of the Atom Splitting" is credited to Lowe/Tennant/Lipson/Horn.

UK 7-inch single
No.	Title	Length
1.	"Left to My Own Devices"	4:43
2.	"The Sound of the Atom Splitting" (extended version)	5:13
Total length:		9:56

UK 12-inch single
No.	Title	Length
1.	"Left to My Own Devices" (Disco mix)	11:28
2.	"Left to My Own Devices"	4:43
3.	"The Sound of the Atom Splitting"	3:37
Total length:		19:48

UK CD single
No.	Title	Length
1.	"Left to My Own Devices"	4:43
2.	"Left to My Own Devices" (Disco mix)	11:28
3.	"The Sound of the Atom Splitting"	3:37
Total length:		19:48

== Personnel ==
Personnel are adapted from the liner notes for Introspective: Further Listening 1988–1989 and "Left to My Own Devices".

Pet Shop Boys

- Neil Tennant
- Chris Lowe

Additional musicians

- Sally Bradshaw – additional vocals (album version and Disco mix)
- Bruce Woolley – additional vocals (7-inch single version and Disco mix)
- Stephen Lipson – guitar (7-inch single version)

Technical

- Trevor Horn – production, remixing
- Stephen Lipson – production, engineering, remixing
- Richard Niles – orchestral arrangement, conducting
- Danton Supple – engineering assistance
- Robin Hancock – remixing (Disco mix)

Artwork

- Mark Farrow and PSB – design
- Michael Roberts – photography

== Charts ==
=== Weekly charts ===
Weekly chart performance for "Left to My Own Devices"
Chart (1988–1989)	Peak position
Australia (ARIA)	48
Belgium (Ultratop 50 Flanders)	17
Canada Top Singles (RPM)	85
Europe (Eurochart Hot 100 Singles)	14
Finland (Suomen virallinen lista)	8
Greece (IFPI)	3
Ireland (IRMA)	3
Italy (Musica e dischi)	13
Luxembourg (Radio Luxembourg)	3
Netherlands (Dutch Top 40)	19
Netherlands (Single Top 100)	18
New Zealand (Recorded Music NZ)	22
Quebec (ADISQ)	29
Spain (AFYVE)	5
Switzerland (Schweizer Hitparade)	12
UK Singles (Official Charts)	4
US Billboard Hot 100	84
US Dance Club Songs (Billboard)	8
US Dance Singles Sales (Billboard)	25
US Cash Box Top 100	74
West Germany (GfK)	9

=== Year-end charts ===
Year-end chart performance for "Left to My Own Devices"
Chart (1989)	Position
West Germany (Media Control)	79

== Release history ==
Release dates and formats for "Left to My Own Devices"
Region	Date	Format(s)	Label(s)	Ref(s).
United Kingdom	14 November 1988	7-inch vinyl; 12-inch vinyl	Parlophone	
United Kingdom	21 November 1988	CD; cassette	Parlophone	
Japan	25 January 1989	Mini-CD	EMI	
