= Love Comes Quickly =

- 7-inch single cover

Single by Pet Shop Boys

from the album Please
- B-side: "That's My Impression"
- Released: 24 February 1986
- Recorded: 1985
- Genre: Synth-pop
- Length: 4:19
- Label: Parlophone
- Songwriters: Neil Tennant; Chris Lowe; Stephen Hague
- Producer: Stephen Hague

Pet Shop Boys singles chronology
"West End Girls" (1985)	"Love Comes Quickly" (1986)	"Opportunities (Let's Make Lots of Money)" (1986)

Music video
- "Love Comes Quickly" on YouTube

"Love Comes Quickly" is a song by English synth-pop duo Pet Shop Boys, released as the second single from their debut studio album, Please (1986). It peaked at number 19 on the UK Singles Chart in March 1986.

== Composition and recording ==
"Love Comes Quickly" was written by Chris Lowe and Neil Tennant in early 1985, near the end of their time at Ray Roberts' Camden studio where they'd done much of their work. The duo considered it one of their most mature compositions at that point.

During the recording sessions for Please, producer Stephen Hague used a Roland MSQ-700 sequencer, which accidentally shifted the bassline off the beat, and he incorporated that into the track. Hague suggested adding a middle eight and received a co-writing credit for its first two chords.

"Love Comes Quickly" features handclaps, inspired by Sharon Redd's "Never Give You Up" (1982), and the first appearance of a high string line, which became a trademark of their songs. Andy Mackay of Roxy Music plays the saxophone parts towards the end.

== Release ==
"Love Comes Quickly" was released on 24 February 1986 as the follow-up to the number one hit "West End Girls". The single only reached number 19 on the UK chart and fell out of the top 100 six weeks later, prompting concerns that they might be a one-hit wonder. A special 10-inch edition that came in a bag with a poster was released in an effort to boost sales.

As with "Opportunities", the 12-version of the single contains remixes by 1980s producer Shep Pettibone. The remixes of "Love Comes Quickly" and "That's My Impression" reached the top ten on the US Billboard Hot Dance Club Play chart in October 1986. Later, in 2003, new remixes by Blank & Jones were produced for the promotion of the singles collection PopArt.

Pet Shop Boys sampled "Love Comes Quickly" for their song "Somebody Else's Business", which appeared on the Disco 3 album in 2003.

=== Artwork ===
The cover, featuring Chris Lowe in a baseball cap emblazoned with "BOY" in block letters, has become an iconic Pet Shop Boys image. Neil Tennant later recollected that he had expected the image of the cap to be the group's coming out moment, calling it "incredibly gay".

== Critical reception ==
In a contemporary review for Billboard's "Dance Trax" column, Brian Chin wrote that "Pet Shop Boys' "Love Comes Quickly" (Parlophone U.K.) is even more a tribute to drifting Italian disco-pop than the team's current hit. Once "West End Girls" has concluded what will undoubtedly be a hugely successful run, this will follow nicely. The flip, "That's My Impression," deserves double A-rank, with its jittery hi-NRG beat and petulant lyric." Dave Henderson of Sounds noted that the "mellow" song is "not as immediately striking" as "West End Girls", but added the Pet Shop Boys "know their onions when it comes to massaging the correct ear lobes".

In a 2023 interview with Greatest Hits Radio, Noel Gallagher stated that "Love Comes Quickly" is the song he wished he'd written.

== Music video ==
Directed by Andy Morahan and Eric Watson, the video to the song is very simple, utilising facial shots of Tennant singing, interposed with blurry montages of the faces of various other people; at points, shots of Lowe, lying on top of a construction of a square grid, are superimposed over these shots. Watson would later call it a "complete disaster".

== Live performances ==
Pet Shop Boys performed "Love Comes Quickly", along with "West End Girls", at the 1986 MTV Video Music Awards, accompanied by singer Ava Cherry. The song was on the setlist of their first tour in 1989. More recently, "Love Comes Quickly" has been performed on the Super Tour in 2016–2017 with Tennant on keyboards and on the Dreamworld tour in 2022–2024.

== Track listings ==
=== 7": Parlophone / R 6116 (UK) ===
- A. "Love Comes Quickly" – 4:18
- B. "That's My Impression" – 4:45

=== 12": Parlophone / 12 R 6116 (UK) ===
- A. "Love Comes Quickly" (Dance Mix) – 6:50
- B. "That's My Impression" (Disco Mix) – 5:18
  - also released on 10" (10 R 6116)

=== 12": EMI America / V-19218 (US) ===
- A1. "Love Comes Quickly" (Pettibone Mastermix) – 7:34
- A2. "Love Comes Quickly" (Dub Version) – 6:55
- B1. "Love Comes Quickly" (Dance Mix) – 6:50
- B2. "That's My Impression" (Disco Mix) – 5:18

== Personnel ==
Credits adapted from the liner notes for Please: Further Listening 1984–1986 and "Love Comes Quickly".

Pet Shop Boys

- Chris Lowe
- Neil Tennant

Additional musicians

- Andy Mackay – saxophone

Technical

- Stephen Hague – production
- David Jacob – engineering

Artwork

- Mark Farrow – design
- Chris Lowe – design
- Eric Watson – photography

== Charts ==
Chart performance for "Love Comes Quickly"
Chart (1986)	Peak position
Australia (Kent Music Report)	54
Belgium (Ultratop 50 Flanders)	35
Canada Top Singles (RPM)	74
Europe (European Hot 100 Singles)	15
Finland (Suomen virallinen lista)	12
Ireland (IRMA)	13
Luxembourg (Radio Luxembourg)	16
New Zealand (Recorded Music NZ)	8
Spain (AFYVE)	6
Switzerland (Schweizer Hitparade)	24
UK Singles (Official Charts)	19
US Billboard Hot 100	62
US Dance Club Songs (Billboard) with "That's My Impression"	10
US Dance Singles Sales (Billboard) with "That's My Impression"	37
US Cash Box Top 100 Singles	56
West Germany (GfK)	17

== Cover versions ==
As early as 1986, a Japanese-language cover version of the song was recorded by pop singer Hidemi Ishikawa.

UK hardcore rave group Ultrabeat covered the song in 2005 with additional production and writing from fellow hardcore producer Hixxy.
