= The Pop Kids =

- Digital EP cover

Single by Pet Shop Boys

from the album Super
- B-side: "In Bits"; "One-Hit Wonder"
- Released: 16 February 2016
- Recorded: 2015
- Genre: Synth-pop; handbag house
- Length: 3:55
- Label: x2
- Songwriters: Neil Tennant; Chris Lowe
- Producer: Stuart Price

Pet Shop Boys singles chronology
"Fluorescent" (2014)	"The Pop Kids" (2016)	"Twenty-something" (2016)

Music video
- "The Pop Kids" (lyric video) on YouTube

"The Pop Kids" is a song by English synth-pop duo Pet Shop Boys from their thirteenth studio album, Super (2016). It was released on 16 February 2016 as the album's lead single. It reached number one on Billboard's Dance Club Songs chart.

== Background and composition ==
Chris Lowe wrote the music for the song in Munich in 2011, when Pet Shop Boys were the opening act on Take That's Progress Live tour. He brought out the demo, called "Munich", for the songwriting sessions for Super in 2014.

Neil Tennant wrote the lyrics for "The Pop Kids" based on a friend's experiences at university in the 1990s, bonding with a fellow student over a shared love of pop music. A remix of the song, subtitled "The Full Story", brought the pop kids' lives up to the present with an extra verse. During Tennant's time at Smash Hits, the magazine staff used the phrase "the pop kids of today" to describe their readers. He called the song a celebration of the euphoria and camaraderie that can come from pop music, as well as its importance to people.

== Release ==
"The Pop Kids" was made available on 16 February 2016 to anyone who pre-ordered Super on iTunes. A CD single and two digital bundles were released on 18 March, including remixes by MK, The Scene Kings and Offer Nissim, as well as two previously unreleased B-sides, "In Bits" and "One Hit Wonder". A white vinyl twelve-inch single was released on 27 May, featuring five remixes of the song.

"The Pop Kids" was Pet Shop Boys' eleventh number one on the Billboard Dance Club Songs chart. It entered the chart at number 28 on 19 March 2016 and climbed to the top spot by 30 April. Billboard writer Gordon Murray noted that remixes from MK, Offer Nissim, and RNG helped boost its performance. "The Pop Kids" was also number one on the Hot Singles Sales chart, and number 21 on the Hot Dance/Electronic Songs chart.

In the UK, "The Pop Kids" reached number one on the Physical Singles Chart but missed out on the UK Top 100 at number 128.

=== Artwork ===
The single covers for "The Pop Kids" were based on the circle design from the album cover of Super. The circles were filled with still images from a promotional video for the album showing people dancing in a club, overlaid with text in different colours for each format.

A lyric video for the song was made using the same imagery, with the words appearing inside a circle, superimposed on a video clip of the dancers.

== Critical reception ==
Alexandra Fletcher of PopMatters rated the single 8 out of 10, writing: "Somebody get the synthpop crown and adorn it on the heads of these talented men. As soon as the hook hit and the beat dropped it was clear the Pet Shop Boys had gone and done it again." Contributors to The Singles Jukebox gave it an average of 7.33, ranging from 6 to 9. Cassy Gress called it "a pretty standard Pet Shop Boys song with pretty standard house piano grafted onto it. I sort of like this, but it's one of those things where two great tastes don't necessarily taste all that good together." Abby Waysdorf praised the "specificity and vividness to the characters and situation, with just that bit of wistfulness that has always been a hallmark of their narrative songs." Apple Magazine described the release as "maybe slightly predictable style, but still to the accomplished standard that we’ve come to expect."

== Live performances ==
The song was performed live on The Graham Norton Show on 25 March 2016, with a backdrop of coloured circles designed by Es Devlin. During the Super Tour from 2016 to 2019, Pet Shop Boys performed "The Pop Kids" in the main set and played a reprise during the encore. The song was performed again on the Dreamworld: The Greatest Hits Live tour in 2025. The duo referred to the younger musicians accompanying them on tour as the "Pop Kids".

== Track listings ==
- CD single / digital EP
1. "The Pop Kids" (radio edit) – 3:43
2. "In Bits" – 3:35
3. "One-Hit Wonder" – 3:24
4. "The Pop Kids" (PSB Deep dub) – 5:20
5. "The Pop Kids" (The Full Story) – 5:13
- Digital EP – Remixes
1. "The Pop Kids" (Offer Nissim Drama mix) – 6:31
2. "The Pop Kids" (MK dub radio edit) – 3:34
3. "The Pop Kids" (PSB Deep dub radio edit) – 3:19
4. "The Pop Kids" (MK dub) – 7:17
- 12-inch single

A1. "The Pop Kids" (Offer Nissim Drama mix) – 6:30
A2. "The Pop Kids" (MK dub) – 7:17
A3. "The Pop Kids" (The Scene Kings extended mix) – 4:38
B1. "The Pop Kids" (The Full Story) – 5:11
B2. "The Pop Kids" (PSB Deep dub) – 5:18

== Charts ==
=== Weekly charts ===
Weekly chart performance for "The Pop Kids"
Chart (2016)	Peak position
Belgium (Ultratip Bubbling Under Wallonia)	44
France (SNEP)	138
Japan Hot 100 (Billboard)	80
Japan Hot Overseas (Billboard)	10
UK Singles (OCC)	128
UK Dance (OCC)	32
UK Indie (OCC)	13
US Dance Club Songs (Billboard)	1
US Hot Dance/Electronic Songs (Billboard)	21
US Hot Singles Sales (Billboard)	1

=== Year-end charts ===
Year-end chart performance for "The Pop Kids"
Chart (2016)	Position
US Dance Club Songs (Billboard)	34

== See also ==
- List of Billboard Dance Club Songs number ones of 2016
