= Corona Capital =

Annual music festival in Mexico City

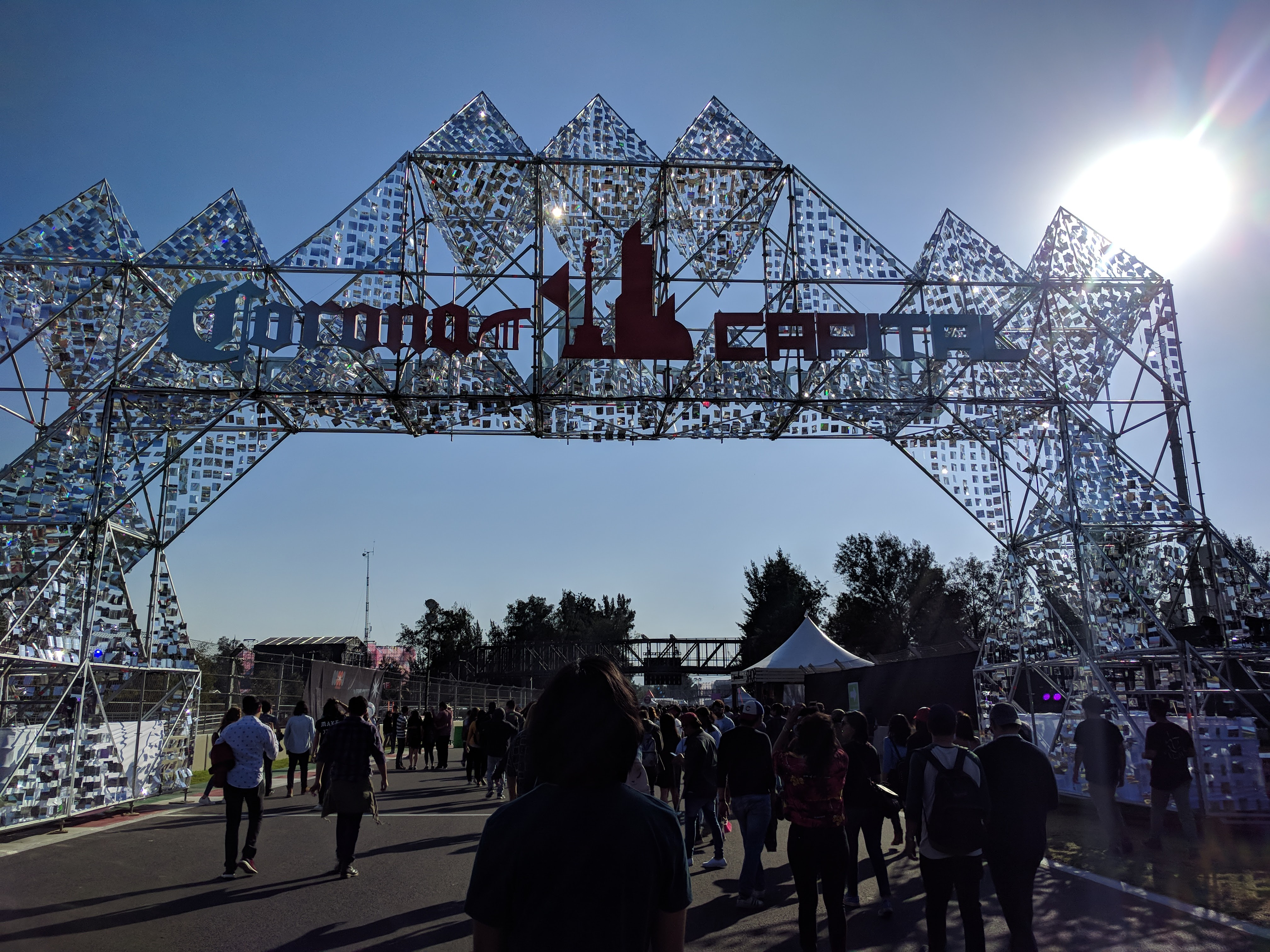
- Corona Capital 2017
- Genre: Alternative rock; punk rock; indie rock; heavy metal music; hip-hop
- Date: Early November
- Frequency: Annual
- Location: Mexico
- Years active: 2010–present
- Inaugurated: 2010
- Founder: OCESA
- Most recent: 14 November 2025–16 November 2025
- Website: coronacapital.com.mx

Corona Capital is an annual music festival held in Mexico City, taking place annually each November at the Autódromo Hermanos Rodríguez. It premiered in 2010, sponsored by Grupo CIE, and primarily features rock and alternative musicians.

Corona Capital has managed to establish itself as one of the largest and most-attended music events in Latin America, and is considered Mexico's equivalent to American festivals such as Coachella and Lollapalooza, with headliners including Alanis Morissette, Arctic Monkeys, Foo Fighters, Garbage, Green Day, Iggy Pop, Lana Del Rey, Miley Cyrus, Portishead, Chappell Roan, Pixies, and The Strokes, among many more. From 2018 to 2023, the festival was expanded with Corona Capital Guadalajara as a separate springtime festival featuring a completely different lineup and was held in Guadalajara, the capital city of the state of Jalisco.

Even with its popularity and success, the festival has also been the subject of much criticism and controversy as its organizers have decided to no longer book Latino or Spanish-speaking artists, despite doing so for the first several years of the event; reportedly, this decision was made as a "solely commercial movement". Organizers have cited other Mexico City festivals, such as Vive Latino and Electric Daisy Carnival (EDC), as events where audiences can support local or Latin performers, resulting in Corona Capital being the only music festival in the world to exclusively host foreign talent.

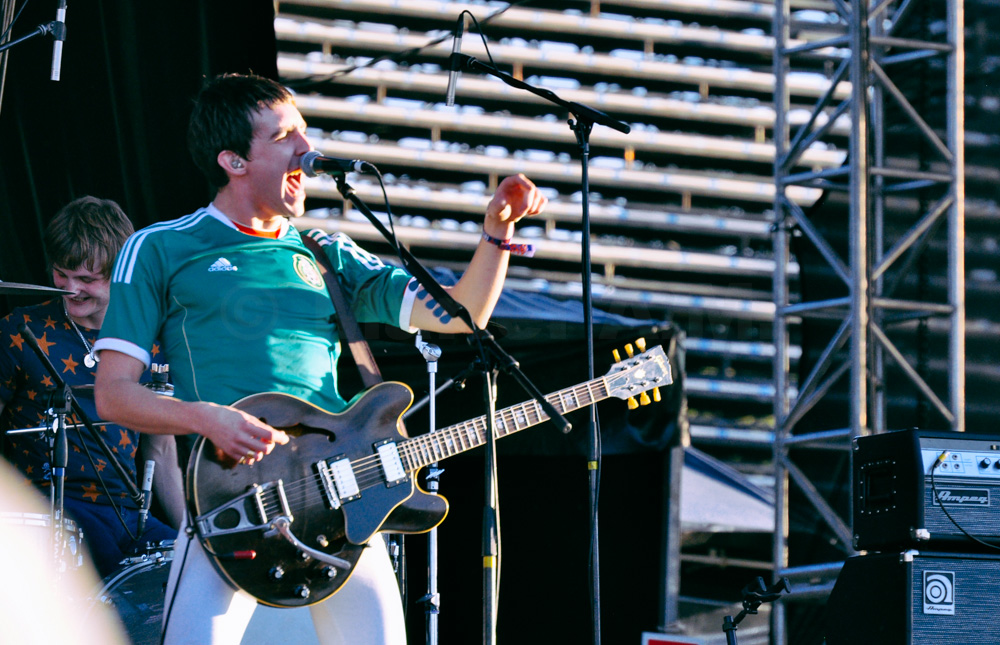
Miles Kane performing at Corona Capital in 2013

== Editions ==
Year	City	Venue	Headliner(s)
2010	Mexico City	Curva 4 Autódromo Hermanos Rodríguez	Pixies; Interpol; James
2011	Mexico City	Curva 4 Autódromo Hermanos Rodríguez	The Strokes; Portishead
2012	Mexico City	Curva 4 Autódromo Hermanos Rodríguez	The Black Keys; New Order; Franz Ferdinand; Suede
2013	Mexico City	Curva 4 Autódromo Hermanos Rodríguez	Deadmau5; Queens of the Stone Age; Arctic Monkeys; Phoenix; The xx; Sigur Rós
2014	Mexico City	Curva 4 Autódromo Hermanos Rodríguez	Kings of Leon; Jack White
2015	Mexico City	Curva 4 Autódromo Hermanos Rodríguez	Calvin Harris; Muse; The Libertines; Pixies
2016	Mexico City	Curva 4 Autódromo Hermanos Rodríguez	The Killers; LCD Soundsystem; Lana Del Rey; Air
2017	Mexico City	Curva 4 Autódromo Hermanos Rodríguez	Foo Fighters; Green Day
2018	Mexico City	Curva 4 Autódromo Hermanos Rodríguez	Robbie Williams; Imagine Dragons; Nine Inch Nails; Lorde; The Chemical Brothers; Khalid; New Order
2018	Guadalajara	Foro Alterno	The Killers; Alanis Morissette; David Byrne
2019	Mexico City	Curva 4 Autódromo Hermanos Rodríguez	The Strokes; Weezer; Franz Ferdinand; Nick Murphy FKA Chet Faker; Billie Eilish; Interpol; Keane; Flume; The Raconteurs
2019	Guadalajara	Estadio Akron	Tame Impala; The Chemical Brothers
2021	Mexico City	Curva 4 Autódromo Hermanos Rodríguez	Tame Impala; Twenty One Pilots
2022	Mexico City	Curva 4 Autódromo Hermanos Rodríguez	My Chemical Romance; Arctic Monkeys; Marina; Paramore; Charli XCX; Yeah Yeah Yeahs; Miley Cyrus; Lil Nas X; The 1975
2022	Guadalajara	Valle VFG	The Strokes; Kings Of Leon
2023	Mexico City	Curva 4 Autódromo Hermanos Rodríguez	Alanis Morissette; Pulp; Arcade Fire; The Black Keys; 30 Seconds to Mars; Pulp; The Chemical Brothers; Pet Shop Boys; The Cure
2023	Guadalajara	Valle VFG	Imagine Dragons; Interpol; The Chainsmokers; Pixies
2024	Mexico City	Curva 4 Autódromo Hermanos Rodríguez	Green Day; Toto; Zedd; Shawn Mendes; Melanie Martinez; New Order; Paul McCartney; Jack White; Beck; Empire of the Sun; Iggy Pop
2025	Mexico City	Curva 4 Autódromo Hermanos Rodríguez	Foo Fighters; Queens of the Stone Age; Franz Ferdinand; Garbage; Polo & Pan; Chappell Roan; Vampire Weekend; Aurora; Jehnny Beth; Alabama Shakes; Linkin Park; Deftones; Weezer; James; Of Monsters and Men
2026	Mexico City	Curva 4 Autódromo Hermanos Rodríguez	Gorillaz; Mumford & Sons; Daniel Caesar; James Blake; The Kooks; Twenty One Pilots; The Offspring; Pierce the Veil; Underworld; Mother Mother; The Strokes; The xx; Lola Young; Lil Yachty; BUNT.
