= Vocal (song) =

Single by Pet Shop Boys

from the album Electric
- Released: 3 June 2013 (digital download); 29 July 2013 (CD single)
- Recorded: April 2013
- Genre: EDM; synth-pop; dance-pop; techno; dance
- Length: 6:34
- Label: x2
- Songwriters: Neil Tennant; Chris Lowe
- Producer: Stuart Price

Pet Shop Boys singles chronology
"Axis" (2013)	"Vocal" (2013)	"Love Is a Bourgeois Construct" (2013)

Music video
- "Vocal" on YouTube

"Vocal" is a song by English synth-pop duo Pet Shop Boys from their twelfth studio album, Electric (2013). It was released as the album's third single on 3 June 2013 by x2. The song was written by the duo and produced by Stuart Price.

== Background and recording ==
"Vocal" was originally intended for Elysium (2012), and it was composed early in the writing sessions for that album in Berlin in 2011. Pet Shop Boys worked on the track with Andrew Dawson, but they ran out of time and ultimately decided it did not fit the reflective mood of Elysium. The demo version of "Vocal" is included on the 2017 reissue Elysium: Further Listening 2011–2012.

Pet Shop Boys' next album, Electric, was a dance record, and "Vocal" fit the theme musically and lyrically. Neil Tennant said the song is about "the sense of community on the dancefloor", recalling in particular being at a nightclub in Brazil with Chris Lowe and other members of the Discovery Tour in 1994. The line "every track has a vocal, and that makes a change" is a reference to the prevalence of instrumental dance tracks.

Producer Stuart Price changed the song significantly from the demo, removing the brass line and making it "probably the most euphoric thing we've ever put out", according to Lowe. The track was finished in April 2013, on the day the album was scheduled to be completed. It is the last track on Electric and ends the album on an optimistic note.

== Release ==
"Vocal" premiered on 1 June 2013 on DJ Dave Pearce's BBC Radio 2 show Dance Years. The song was released as a digital download on 3 June. On 29 July, "Vocal" was released as a CD single and a digital bundle, both containing the album version and eight original remixes. The 12-inch vinyl single was released on 9 December 2013. It was the first physical single release by Pet Shop Boys that did not contain any new B-side songs.

The single reached number three on the Billboard Dance Club Songs chart and number nine on the Music Week Upfront Club Chart in the UK. "Vocal" did not place on the UK Singles Chart. The CD single and digital bundle were not eligible according to the chart rules because they had more than four tracks and were longer than 25 minutes.

=== Artwork ===
The single cover (pictured) features Lowe and Tennant in jackets made out of black plastic straws, which they wore on the Electric Tour. Each jacket was adorned with around 3,500 straws, hand-sewn by the designer, Jeffrey Bryant. The photos were taken by John Ross during tour rehearsals. Mark Farrow designed the cover, with the images positioned like double-ended playing cards. The backgrounds for the CD and 12-inch singles were white with orange inner sleeves, while the downloadable remixes image had an orange background.

== Music video ==
The music video for "Vocal" was directed by Joost Vandebrug. It is a tribute to rave culture and electronic music, consisting of a compilation of various amateur videos recorded circa the Summer of Rave in 1989.

== Live performances ==
The song was performed as the final encore on the Electric Tour. The decision was made to replace "Go West" with "Vocal" at the dress rehearsal before the first show in Santiago, Chile, and the new song was enthusiastically received. "Vocal" was also performed on the Super Tour and the Dreamworld Tour.

== Other performances ==
"Vocal" replaced the original closing number "Positive Role Model" in the 2015 revival of Pet Shop Boys' stage musical Closer to Heaven at London's Union Theatre and the 2019 off West End production at Above the Stag Theatre.

== Track listings ==
CD single / digital download (remixes)
No.	Title	Length
1.	"Vocal" (album version)	6:35
2.	"Vocal" (Rektchordz dub)	6:37
3.	"Vocal" (Armageddon Turk Teargas mix)	6:44
4.	"Vocal" (The Cucarachas mix)	8:06
5.	"Vocal" (JRMX Club mix)	7:59
6.	"Vocal" (Ivan Gomez & Nacho Chapado mix)	7:49
7.	"Vocal" (Rektchordz mix)	6:40
8.	"Vocal" (WAWA extended mix)	6:57
9.	"Vocal" (The Cucarachas dub)	7:53

12-inch single
No.	Title	Length
1.	"Vocal" (album version)	6:35
2.	"Vocal" (Rektchordz dub)	6:37
3.	"Vocal" (Armageddon Turk Teargas mix)	6:44
4.	"Vocal" (The Cucarachas mix)	8:06
5.	"Vocal" (JRMX Club mix)	7:59
6.	"Vocal" (Nacho Chapado & Ivan Gomez mix)	7:49
7.	"Vocal" (Rektchordz mix)	6:40
8.	"Vocal" (WAWA extended mix)	6:57

== Charts ==
=== Weekly charts ===
Weekly chart performance for "Vocal"
Chart (2013)	Peak position
Belgium (Ultratip Bubbling Under Flanders)	58
France (SNEP)	196
Japan Hot 100 (Billboard)	63
US Dance Club Songs (Billboard)	3
US Hot Dance/Electronic Songs (Billboard)	36
US Hot Singles Sales (Billboard)	20

=== Year-end charts ===
Year-end chart performance for "Vocal"
Chart (2013)	Position
US Hot Dance/Electronic Songs (Billboard)	96
