= Winner (Pet Shop Boys song) =

Single by Pet Shop Boys

from the album Elysium
- B-side: "A Certain 'Je Ne Sais Quoi'"; "The Way Through the Woods (long version)"; "I Started a Joke"
- Released: 3 July 2012
- Genre: Synth-pop
- Length: 3:48
- Label: Parlophone
- Songwriters: Neil Tennant; Chris Lowe
- Producers: Andrew Dawson; Pet Shop Boys

Pet Shop Boys singles chronology
"Together" (2010)	"Winner" (2012)	"Leaving" (2012)

Music video
- "Winner" on YouTube

"Winner" is a song by English synth-pop duo Pet Shop Boys, released as the lead single from their eleventh studio album, Elysium (2012). It received its UK radio premiere on The Ken Bruce Show on BBC Radio 2 on 2 July 2012. The next day, it was made available for download, followed by a CD single and two digital bundles on 6 August 2012. The track was featured as BBC Radio 2's "Record of the Week" for the second week of July 2012. Its highest chart position in the UK was 86; it reached number 12 on Billboard's Dance Club Songs chart.

== Background and composition ==
In 2011, Pet Shop Boys were the opening act on Take That's Progress Live tour. During their free time, they wrote a number of songs, including "Winner". They had decided to write a mid-tempo anthem after hearing Take That perform "Greatest Day". Initially they felt the song, with its built in harmonies, was more suitable for a boy band to perform, and they offered it to One Direction as a potential Eurovision selection, but they never heard back. Producer Andrew Dawson convinced them to include it on Elysium.

Neil Tennant commented that the song "is called 'Winner' and superficially it's a sort of 'We Are the Champions' song but actually it's not. It's really about that moment...and really what's important is the camaraderie of everything that got you there. Enjoy the moment, enjoy the memory 'cause it's just a little moment." Tennant likened this feeling to the life-changing experience of "West End Girls" becoming a number one hit.

== Artwork ==
The single cover image is a tri-level podium of the type used for a medal ceremony. The letters P S B are engraved on the base. The cover was designed by Mark Farrow, using a 3D model created by architect Chiara Ferrari. The primary cover was all white, while the downloadable remix single had a yellow podium and a 7-inch promo used green.

== Performances ==
During the 2012 Olympic Games, Pet Shop Boys performed "Winner" before the start of the tennis tournaments on 28 July at Wimbledon. The single was played between tennis matches during the Olympics broadcast. Pet Shop Boys reprised their performance of "Winner" at the Athletes' Parade, celebrating the British team, on 10 September.

== Music video ==
The music video for "Winner" was directed by Surrender Monkeys and the features the London Rollergirls, a roller derby team, and their new rookie, Dirty Diana, who is transgender. The story highlights the inclusive message of the song and the Rollergirls, a league open to all women, including transgender and intersex, as well as non-binary and gender expansive participants. Conservative US gay commentator Andrew Sullivan, said it is "one of the very few videos I've seen that actually celebrates the life of the transgender person".

There was positive reception to the video. Music-News.com commented that the video is touching. Stereogum described the video as "an inspirational sports montage of sorts, but the inspiration doesn't come from any athletic feats; it comes from the whole community-building side effect".

The Pet Shop Boys received a letter which thanked them for positively showing the transgender community.

== Critical reception ==
"Winner" was generally well received. Several reviews noted the song's release in time for the Olympics in London. NME stated, "Pet Shop Boys have released one of the most uplifting songs in the history of the Pet Shop Boys." The Daily Telegraph said the song was patently timed to match the Olympic mood and was "Triumphant, low key; a very English take on things". Popjustice commented that the song "kind of works in the context of all the sport in the air at the moment, but as the lead single from a Pet Shop Boys album it's probably the worst since 'Before'", also stating that the three b-sides eclipse the lead song. Metro stated that the single reminds us the pop icons "... do gently persuasive feelgood with panache". Daily Star gave the song 9 out of 10 and commented, "Deserving a gold medal for cashing in on Olympics fever, the duo's first taste of their new album is a gorgeous epic", and added the song is "such a lovely tune nobody can begrudge them their chance" and it is "a champion performance".

== Track listings ==
Digital download
No.	Title	Writer(s)	Producer(s)	Length
1.	"Winner"	Neil Tennant; Chris Lowe	Andrew Dawson; Pet Shop Boys	3:48

Digital EP / CD single
No.	Title	Writer(s)	Producer(s)	Length
1.	"Winner"	Tennant; Lowe	Dawson; Pet Shop Boys	3:47
2.	"A Certain "Je ne sais quoi""	Tennant; Lowe	Pet Shop Boys	4:58
3.	"The Way Through the Woods" (Long version)	Rudyard Kipling (lyrics); Tennant, Lowe (music)	Dawson; Pet Shop Boys	5:42
4.	"I Started a Joke"	Barry Gibb; Maurice Gibb; Robin Gibb	Pet Shop Boys	3:17

Digital download – "Winner" remixed
No.	Title	Writer(s)	Remixer	Length
1.	"Winner" (Andrew Dawson HappyHour Remix)	Tennant; Lowe	Dawson	4:40
2.	"Winner" (John Dahlbäck Remix)	Tennant; Lowe	John Dahlbäck	5:36
3.	"Winner" (Niki & The Dove Remix)	Tennant; Lowe	Niki & The Dove	6:06
4.	"Winner" (Andrew Dawson Extended HappySad Remix)	Tennant; Lowe	Dawson	8:06

== Personnel ==
Credits adapted from the liner notes for Elysium: Further Listening 2011–2012 and "Winner".

Pet Shop Boys

- Neil Tennant
- Chris Lowe

Additional musicians

- Andrew Dawson – additional programming, guitar
- Pete Gleadall – additional programming
- Ryan Hoyle – drums

Orchestra

- Mark Robertson – violin
- Endre Granat – violin
- Ana Landauer – violin
- Peter Kent – violin
- Clayton Haslop – violin
- Sam Fischer – violin
- Neli Nikolaeva – violin
- Serena McKinney – violin
- Andrew Duckles – viola
- David Walther – viola
- Matt Funes – viola
- Jessica van Velzen Freer – viola
- David Low – cello
- Tim Landauer – cello
- Dennis Karmazyn – cello
- Victor Lawrence – cello
- Vanessa Freebairn-Smith – cello
- Jim Thatcher – French horn
- Lisa McCormick – French horn
- Rick Baptist – trumpet
- Rob Schaer – trumpet

Technical

- Andrew Dawson – production, engineering, mixing, orchestra arrangement
- Pete Gleadall – additional engineering
- Ryan Hoyle – drum recording
- Joachim Horsley – orchestra arrangement, conducting
- Ben Leathers – orchestra arrangement
- Mark Robertson – orchestra contractor
- Robert Fernandez – orchestra engineering, orchestra mixing
- Charlie Paakkari – string engineering assistance

Artwork

- Farrow and PSB – design, art direction
- Chiara Ferrari – 3D model

== Charts ==
Chart performance for "Winner"
Chart (2012)	Peak position
Belgium (Ultratip Bubbling Under Flanders)	55
Belgium (Ultratip Bubbling Under Wallonia)	16
Germany (GfK)	60
Japan Hot 100 (Billboard)	16
UK Singles (OCC)	86
US Dance Club Songs (Billboard)	12
US Dance Singles Sales (Billboard)	8
US Hot Singles Sales (Billboard)	17
US Top Dance Albums (Billboard) "Winner" EP	21
