= Electric Tour =

2013–15 concert tour by Pet Shop Boys

- Tour by Pet Shop Boys
- Location: Europe; America; South America; Middle East; Asia
- Associated album: Elysium; Electric
- Start date: 22 March 2013
- End date: 15 August 2015
- Legs: 2

Pet Shop Boys concert chronology
- Pandemonium Tour (2009–10); Electric Tour (2013–15); Super Tour (2016–19)

The Electric Tour was synth-pop duo Pet Shop Boys' 2013–15 world tour in support of their two albums Elysium and Electric. The first leg started on 22 March and ended in October in Mexico. The second leg of the tour was announced in January 2014, starting at the Coachella festival in California in April. A third leg of the tour was announced in February 2015, starting at the Festival Contempopranea in Badajoz, Spain. Notably, the tour was announced on 5 December 2012 even before the announcement of Electric, the album bearing the same name with the tour.

== Concept ==
The show consists of the band along with two dancers performing in front of a huge screen.

The screen often projects the silhouettes of band members Neil Tennant and Chris Lowe morphing into different colours or shapes according to each song, but it also projects other types of videos, such as visiting places of the world via Google Earth during "Somewhere".

The show starts with "Axis" and ends, on most dates, with "Vocal", which are respectively the opening and closing tracks of their Electric album.

The set list has some short interludes or extended instrumental parts to allow the band to go offstage, change costumes and come back. Those moments could also be considered as links between one act and another in the show.

The dancers always have their faces covered in some way. They appear for the first time during the interlude preceding "I Wouldn't Normally Do This Kind of Thing" and finish off on "Vocal", both times wearing big minotaur masks.

== Reviews ==
Alex Needham of The Guardian said of the Sydney shows, "Like a lot of their long career, the show walks a tightrope between pop and art, silliness and profundity. Much of it sees the Pet Shop Boys perform in extravangant outfits (fluorescent orange jackets; a disco ball which entirely covers Lowe’s head) in front of specially-made films ranging from Google Earth images for Somewhere to equations for Opportunities (Let’s Make Lots of Money)."

Robert Collins of CTV British Columbia said of the Vancouver show, "... they comprehensively proved how ideas are at the heart of pop stardom."

== Setlist ==
2013
1. "Axis (Intro)"
2. "One More Chance / A Face Like That"
3. "Opportunities (Let's Make Lots of Money)" (contains a sample from "In the Night")
4. "Memory of the Future"
5. "Fugitive"
6. "Integral"
7. "The Rite of Spring (Interlude)"
8. "I Wouldn't Normally Do This Kind of Thing"
9. "Suburbia"
10. "I'm Not Scared"
11. "Invisible" (May–July shows) or "Fluorescent" (Added August)
12. "The Last to Die" (replaced by "West End Girls" in August)
13. "Somewhere"
14. "Leaving"
15. "Thursday" (feat. Example)
16. "Love Etc."
17. "I Get Excited (You Get Excited Too) / Rent"
18. "Miracles"
19. "It's a Sin"
20. "Domino Dancing"
21. "Go West"
22. "Love Is a Bourgeois Construct" (exceptionally in Santiago on May 13th instead of "Go West")
23. "Always on My Mind"

Encore

1. "West End Girls" (May–August shows)
2. "Vocal"
2014
1. "Axis (Intro)"
2. "One More Chance / A Face Like That"
3. "Opportunities (Let's Make Lots of Money)" (contains a sample from "In the Night")
4. "Love Is a Bourgeois Construct" (only on select dates)
5. "Fugitive"
6. "Integral"
7. "The Rite of Spring (Interlude)"
8. "I Wouldn't Normally Do This Kind of Thing"
9. "Suburbia"
10. "I'm Not Scared"
11. "Fluorescent"
12. "West End Girls"
13. "Somewhere"
14. "Leaving"
15. "Thursday" (feat. Example)
16. "Love Etc."
17. "I Get Excited (You Get Excited Too) / Rent"
18. "Miracles"
19. "It's a Sin"
20. "Domino Dancing"
21. "Always on My Mind"

Encore

1. "Being Boring" (only on select dates)
2. "Go West"
3. "Vocal / It's Alright"

== Tour dates ==
Date	City	Country	Venue
North America
22 March 2013	Papantla	Mexico	Cumbre Tajín Festival
South America
13 May 2013	Santiago	Chile	Movistar Arena
16 May 2013	Buenos Aires	Argentina	Luna Park
18 May 2013	Luque	Paraguay	Centro de Convenciones de la Conmebol
22 May 2013	São Paulo	Brazil	Credicard Hall
25 May 2013	Bogotá	Colombia	Centro de Eventos Bima
Europe & Middle East
3 June 2013	Saint Petersburg	Russia	Oktyabrskiy Big Concert Hall
5 June 2013	Moscow	Russia	Crocus City Hall
9 June 2013	Copenhagen	Denmark	Falkoner Salen
11 June 2013	Paris	France	Grand Rex
15 June 2013	Barcelona	Spain	Sónar Festival 2013
18 June 2013	London	England	The O_{2} Arena
20 June 2013	Manchester	England	Manchester Arena
23 June 2013	Tel Aviv	Israel	Nokia Arena
29 June 2013	Stockholm	Sweden	Cirkus
1 July 2013	Dortmund	Germany	Music Week Festival
3 July 2013	Karlovy Vary	Czech Republic	KV Arena
5 July 2013	Tallinn	Estonia	Tallinn Song Festival Grounds
7 July 2013	Turku	Finland	Ruisrock
9 July 2013	Freiburg	Germany	ZMF
10 July 2013	Munich	Germany	Tollwood Festival at Musik Arena
13 July 2013	Byblos	Lebanon	Byblos Festival
16 July 2013	Athens	Greece	Ejekt Festival
Asia
3 August 2013	Sentosa	Singapore	Resorts World Convention Centre
6 August 2013	Quezon City	Philippines	Araneta Coliseum
9 August 2013	Tokyo	Japan	Makuhari Messe
11 August 2013	Tokyo	Japan	Summer Sonic Festival
14 August 2013	Seoul	South Korea	Supersonic Festival
17 August 2013	Jakarta	Indonesia	Jakarta Convention Center
20 August 2013	Shanghai	China	Shanghai Grand Stage
22 August 2013	Beijing	China	MasterCard Center
24 August 2013	Bangkok	Thailand	Impact Arena
Europe
4 September 2013	Gdańsk	Poland	Ergo Arena
6 September 2013	Berlin	Germany	Berlin Festival
North America
12 September 2013	Miami Beach	United States	Jackie Gleason Theater
13 September 2013	Saint Petersburg	United States	Mahaffey Theater
14 September 2013	Atlanta	United States	Atlanta Symphony Hall
16 September 2013	New York City	United States	Beacon Theatre
17 September 2013	New York City	United States	Beacon Theatre
19 September 2013	Bethesda	United States	Strathmore
21 September 2013	Boston	United States	House of Blues
22 September 2013	Philadelphia	United States	Mann Center for the Performing Arts
24 September 2013	Montreal	Canada	Olympia Theatre
25 September 2013	Toronto	Canada	Sony Centre for the Performing Arts
27 September 2013	Windsor	Canada	Caesars Windsor
28 September 2013	Chicago	United States	Auditorium Building
2 October 2013	Seattle	United States	Paramount Theatre
3 October 2013	Vancouver	Canada	Queen Elizabeth Theatre
4 October 2013	Portland	United States	Arlene Schnitzer Concert Hall
5 October 2013	Oakland	United States	Fox Theatre
7 October 2013	Oakland	United States	Fox Theatre
8 October 2013	San Diego	United States	Copley Symphony Hall
11 October 2013	Las Vegas	United States	Hard Rock Hotel and Casino
12 October 2013	Los Angeles	United States	Shrine Auditorium
15 October 2013	Mexico City	Mexico	Mexico City Arena
Europe
31 December 2013	Edinburgh	Scotland	Hogmanay at the Gardens
North America
8 April 2014	Oakland	United States	Fox Theatre
11 April 2014	Ventura	United States	Ventura Theater
12 April 2014	Coachella	United States	Coachella Festival
15 April 2014	Dallas	United States	The Majestic Theatre
16 April 2014	Austin	United States	ACL Live at the Moody Theater
18 April 2014	Phoenix	United States	Comerica Theatre
19 April 2014	Coachella	United States	Coachella Festival
23 April 2014	Asheville	United States	Moogfest
25 April 2014	Atlantic City	United States	Revel Casino Hotel – Ovation Hall
26 April 2014	New York City	United States	Terminal 5
Australia
6 June 2014	Sydney	Australia	Carriageworks
7 June 2014	Sydney	Australia	Carriageworks
8 June 2014	Sydney	Australia	Carriageworks
Europe
13 June 2014	Birmingham	England	LG Arena
15 June 2014	Cardiff	Wales	Motorpoint Arena
16 June 2014	Blackpool	England	Empress Ballroom
4 July 2014	Vienna	Austria	Jazz Fest Wien
7 July 2014	Budapest	Hungary	Budapest Park
10 July 2014	Novi Sad	Serbia	Exit Festival
12 July 2014	Liepāja	Latvia	LMT Summer Sound
14 July 2014	Zürich	Switzerland	Live At Sunset Festival
18 July 2014	Pori	Finland	Pori Jazz Festival
25 July 2014	Turin	Italy	Traffic Festival
30 July 2014	Marbella	Spain	Starlite Festival
1 August 2014	Gijón	Spain	Plaza La Laboral
3 August 2014	Girona	Spain	Cap Roig Festival
7 August 2014	Skanderborg	Denmark	Smukfest Skanderborg
9 August 2014	Lokeren	Belgium	Lokerse Festival
10 August 2014	Utrecht	Netherlands	TivoliVredenburg
11 August 2014	Utrecht	Netherlands	TivoliVredenburg
13 August 2014	Prague	Czech Republic	Forum Karlín
15 August 2014	Copenhagen	Denmark	Smukfest Copenhagen
29 August 2014	Stradbally	Ireland	Electric Picnic
25 August 2014	Borchester	England	Loxfest on The Archers
31 August 2014	Bingley	England	Bingley Music Live Festival
2 September 2014	Gateshead	England	The Sage
3 September 2014	Gateshead	England	The Sage
5 September 2014	Glasgow	Scotland	Clyde Auditorium
7 September 2014	Portmeirion	Wales	Festival No. 6
Asia
20 September 2014	Singapore	Singapore	Formula 1 Singapore Airlines Singapore Grand Prix
24 September 2014	Kuala Lumpur	Malaysia	Stadium Negara
26 September 2014	Hong Kong	Hong Kong	Asiaworld Expo Hall 10
28 September 2014	Taipei	Taiwan	Linko Dome
South America
22 November 2014	Punta Del Este	Uruguay	Conrad Resort and Casino
Africa
12 December 2014	Johannesburg	South Africa	Sandton Convention Centre
15 December 2014	Cape Town	South Africa	Good Hope Centre
19 December 2014	Durban	South Africa	Moses Mabhida Stadium
Europe
5 June 2015	Badajoz	Spain	Festival Contempopranea
8 June 2015	Barcelona	Spain	Festival Jardins De Pedralbes
25 June 2015	Rome	Italy	Auditorium Parco della Musica
27 June 2015	Ljubljana	Slovenia	Flow Festival Ljubljana
14 August 2015	Gothenburg	Sweden	Way Out West Festival
15 August 2015	Helsinki	Finland	Flow Festival

== Personnel ==
Pet Shop Boys

- Neil Tennant
- Chris Lowe

Dancers

- Merry Holden
- Tom Herron

Creative and tour personnel

- Es Devlin – creative director and set design
- Rob Sinclair – lighting design
- Andrew Turner – laser design
- Luke Halls – video content
- Jack James – video/LED director
- Jeffrey Bryant – costume design
- Andy Crookston – tour manager
- Thomas Stone – production manager
- Matt Gurney – stage manager
- Holger Schwark – sound engineer
- Seamus Fenton – monitor engineer
- Jon Barker – lighting director
- Michael Bowerman – lighting crew chief
- Ed Duda – lighting technician
- Kenny Rutkowski – lighting technician
