= Hotspot (album) =

Studio album by Pet Shop Boys
- Released: 24 January 2020
- Recorded: 2018–2019
- Studio: Hansa (Berlin); RAK (London); Record Plant (Los Angeles)
- Genre: Electropop
- Length: 42:03
- Label: x2
- Producer: Stuart Price

Pet Shop Boys chronology
Inner Sanctum (2019)	Hotspot (2020)	Discovery: Live in Rio 1994 (2021)

Singles from Hotspot
- 1. "Dreamland" Released: 11 September 2019; 2. "Burning the Heather" Released: 14 November 2019; 3. "Monkey Business" Released: 2 January 2020; 4. "I Don't Wanna" Released: 24 April 2020

Hotspot is the fourteenth studio album by English synth-pop duo Pet Shop Boys, released on 24 January 2020 by the band's own label x2, through Kobalt Label Services. It was supported by the singles "Dreamland" featuring Years & Years, "Burning the Heather", "Monkey Business", and "I Don't Wanna". The duo planned the Dreamworld tour to promote the album in mid-2020, but it was postponed due to the COVID-19 pandemic. The album reached number three on the charts in the United Kingdom, Germany, and Spain, and it was number one on Billboard's Top Dance/Electronic Albums chart in the United States.

== Background and recording ==
Hotspot was the third in a trilogy of albums produced by Stuart Price, following Electric (2013) and Super (2016). The album was primarily recorded at Hansa Studios in Berlin where the duo had written "most of [their] music over the last ten years". During a ten-day session in November 2018, they used the studio's analogue equipment to give Hotspot a different quality from the digital sound of the previous two albums.

Several songs on Hotspot make reference to Berlin. Neil Tennant described the opening track, "Will-o-the-Wisp", as a queer song that imagines the author Christopher Isherwood encountering an ex-boyfriend from his 1939 autobiographical novel Goodbye to Berlin years later on a U-Bahn train. The bells of St. Matthias church on Winterfeldtplatz are heard on the songs "Happy People" and "Wedding in Berlin". "You Are the One" describes a summer afternoon in Berlin spent by Schlachtensee lake in Zehlendorf and in the borough of Mitte. The backdrop of the lyric video for "Dreamland" is modelled after a U-Bahn station in Mitte.

"Burning the Heather", featuring Bernard Butler on guitar, was recorded at RAK Studios in London. Additional recording took place in 2019 in Los Angeles, and the album was mixed there at the Record Plant. Chris Lowe cited the studio's experience with making R&B, hip-hop, and contemporary pop records as an influence on the sound of Hotspot, which he called "a transitioning album. It has elements of the previous, but then it's moving towards where we might be going next". The title was chosen because Berlin was a hotspot during the Cold War. "Hotspot" also refers to an internet access point or a popular club.

== Release ==
Hotspot debuted at number three on the UK Albums Chart, making it the Pet Shop Boys' 17th top 10 album. Released on 24 January 2020 by the duo's own label x2, Hotspot spent two weeks at number one on the UK Independent Albums Chart, and it also topped the Vinyl Albums and Physical Albums charts.

The album was available on CD, vinyl, cassette, and digital formats. A print of the album artwork hand-signed by Tennant and Lowe was offered as an incentive for pre-ordering Hotspot. A limited edition CD came with a bonus disc of instrumental versions of the album tracks.

== Singles ==
"Dreamland" was released on 11 September 2019, with the news that a new album and a tour were scheduled for 2020. An expanded package was issued on 25 October on CD, digital, and 12-inch vinyl formats, featuring remixes and two new songs: "No Boundaries", from the play My Beautiful Laundrette, and "An Open Mind". "Dreamland" was a collaboration with Olly Alexander and was originally intended for a Years & Years album, but they decided it was better suited as a Pet Shop Boys release. Alexander was inspired by a visit to the Dreamland Margate amusement park, and Tennant added the narrative of a refugee's experience.

"Burning the Heather" was released alongside the official album announcement on 14 November 2019. A single package with the bonus track "Decide" followed on 13 December, including the first 7-inch vinyl single since "Leaving" in 2012. "Burning the Heather" began as a poem written by Tennant after he observed a controlled burn of heather on the moorland in County Durham in autumn; he sent the words to Lowe, who set them to music. Guitarist Bernard Butler performs on the track.

"Monkey Business" was released on 2 January 2020, with a full single package coming out on 7 February on CD, digital, and 12-inch vinyl formats, including remixes by Prins Thomas and DJ Friend Within and a new song, "At Rock Bottom". The music video was directed by Vaughan Arnell at the Pryzm nightclub in Watford. The dancefloor scenes were inspired by Saturday Night Fever (1977) and La Grande Bellezza (2013) and were choreographed by Lynne Page. Pet Shop Boys appear in the video, and Lowe does some dance moves. "Monkey Business" was written during the sessions for Super (2016). The duo described it as a "groove song". The title came from a man they met in Austin, Texas, who said he was there for "monkey business, just playing around".

"I Don't Wanna" was released on 24 April 2020 on CD, digital, and 12-inch vinyl, with remixes by Mano Le Tough and David Jackson plus the song "New Boy", which was originally written in 1984. "I Don't Wanna" originated as an instrumental by Lowe, inspired by the Tracey Thorn song "Dancefloor" from Record (2018).

== Critical reception ==
Professional ratings
Aggregate scores
Source	Rating
Metacritic	75/100
Review scores
Source	Rating
AllMusic	4/5 stars
And It Don't Stop	(3-star Honorable Mention)
Clash	8/10
The Daily Telegraph	4/5 stars
The Independent	4/5 stars
NME	4/5 stars
Paste	6.8/10
Pitchfork	6.1/10
The Quietus	3/5 stars
Tom Hull – on the Web	(3-star Honorable Mention)

Hotspot was met with generally positive reviews. At Metacritic, which assigns a normalised rating out of 100 to reviews from mainstream critics, the album has an average score of 75 out of 100, based on 18 reviews.

Ross Horton of The Line of Best Fit rated Hotspot an 8 out of 10, calling it "a stylistically diverse, risk-taking album that draws on so much of the band's back catalogue that there’s at least one thing here for everyone" but noted that fans of Electric and Super "might be taken (slightly) aback by the more relaxed, nuanced feel of Hotspot, which feels more considered and thoughtful than any PSB album since their 1990 magnum opus, Behaviour". Christina Lambert of the Washington Blade concluded: "Without question, "Hotspot" is an overall win, an absolute treat to spend time with and a satisfying conclusion to their Price collaboration. No matter what direction they head next, Pet Shop Boys are still here, still relevant, still masters at balancing powerful pop with insightful message, here with a little more gravitas. Don't sleep on this beautifully executed album". Gary Ryan of NME felt that Hotspot "proves they've lost none of their magic touch", giving it 4 out of 5 stars, with the "minor criticism" that it "feels comfortably familiar business as usual. There's no jolting shock-of-the-new: they're just reassuringly here, refining what they do best".

Alfred Soto of Pitchfork rated it 6.1 out of 10, summarizing: "On their 14th studio album, the best-selling duo in UK pop dampen the euphoria; the result is a tuneful, wan album that lands somewhere in the middle of their rich catalogue". In his "Consumer Guide" column, Robert Christgau highlighted "I Don't Wanna", "Wedding in Berlin", and "Will-o-the-Wisp", and wrote in summary of the album: "'Happy people/Living in a sad world,' they celebrate their good fortune by setting it to music both stirring and contained – music that never conceals its limitations".

== Track listing ==
All tracks are written by Neil Tennant and Chris Lowe except where noted.

Standard edition
No.	Title	Writer(s)	Length
1.	"Will-o-the-Wisp"		4:28
2.	"You Are the One"		3:35
3.	"Happy People"		3:51
4.	"Dreamland" (featuring Years & Years)	Tennant; Lowe; Olly Alexander	3:26
5.	"Hoping for a Miracle"		5:00
6.	"I Don't Wanna"		4:02
7.	"Monkey Business"	Tennant; Lowe; Stuart Price	4:08
8.	"Only the Dark"		3:38
9.	"Burning the Heather"		5:27
10.	"Wedding in Berlin"		4:42
Total length:			42:16

Japan bonus tracks
No.	Title	Writer(s)	Length
11.	"Dreamland" (TWD vocal remix)	Tennant; Lowe; Alexander	5:06
12.	"Monkey Business" (Prins Thomas Diskomiks)	Tennant; Lowe; Price	8:45
Total length:			56:13

Special edition disc 2
No.	Title	Writer(s)	Length
1.	"Will-o-the-Wisp" (instrumental)		4:28
2.	"You Are the One" (instrumental)		3:35
3.	"Happy People" (instrumental)		3:51
4.	"Dreamland" (featuring Years & Years) (instrumental)	Tennant; Lowe; Alexander	3:26
5.	"Hoping for a Miracle" (instrumental)		5:00
6.	"I Don't Wanna" (instrumental)		4:02
7.	"Monkey Business" (instrumental)	Tennant; Lowe; Price	4:08
8.	"Only the Dark" (instrumental)		3:38
9.	"Burning the Heather" (instrumental)		5:27
10.	"Wedding in Berlin" (instrumental)		4:42
Total length:			42:16

=== Notes ===
"Wedding in Berlin" incorporates music from Felix Mendelssohn's "Wedding March".

== Personnel ==
Credits adapted from the liner notes of Hotspot.

- Pet Shop Boys – performers, programming

Additional musicians

- Years & Years – featured artist ("Dreamland")
- Stuart Price – bass guitar, additional programming
- Bernard Butler – guitar ("Burning the Heather")
- Keely Hawkes – additional vocals ("Monkey Business")

Technical

- Stuart Price – production, mixing
- Pete Gleadall – additional engineering
- Nanni Johansson – engineer (Hansa)
- Max Wittig – assistant engineer (Hansa)
- Frida Claeson Johansson – assistant engineer (Hansa)
- Andrew Keller – assistant engineer (Record Plant)
- Isabel Gracefield – engineer (RAK)
- Dan Ewins – assistant engineer (RAK)
- Tim Young – mastering
- Farrow – design, art direction
- Pet Shop Boys – design, art direction, photography

== Charts ==
Chart performance for Hotspot
Chart (2020)	Peak position
Australian Albums (ARIA)	8
Austrian Albums (Ö3 Austria)	7
Belgian Albums (Ultratop Flanders)	21
Belgian Albums (Ultratop Wallonia)	5
Canadian Albums (Billboard)	61
Czech Albums (ČNS IFPI)	30
Dutch Albums (Album Top 100)	30
Finnish Albums (Suomen virallinen lista)	23
French Albums (SNEP)	72
German Albums (Offizielle Top 100)	3
Hungarian Albums (MAHASZ)	35
Irish Albums (OCC)	20
Italian Albums (FIMI)	44
Japanese Albums (Oricon)	52
Norwegian Albums (VG-lista)	39
Polish Albums (ZPAV)	31
Scottish Albums (OCC)	3
Spanish Albums (PROMUSICAE)	3
Swedish Albums (Sverigetopplistan)	15
Swiss Albums (Schweizer Hitparade)	6
UK Albums (OCC)	3
US Billboard 200	100
US Top Dance Albums (Billboard)	1
