= Elysium (Pet Shop Boys album) =

Studio album by Pet Shop Boys
- Released: 5 September 2012
- Recorded: January–March 2012
- Studio: SoundEQ, Hollywood; Capitol, Hollywood; Record One, Sherman Oaks, California; Live Drum Tracks, Los Angeles (Note: Drums on tracks 3 and 8)
- Genre: Synth-pop
- Length: 51:02
- Label: Parlophone
- Producer: Andrew Dawson; Pet Shop Boys

Pet Shop Boys chronology
Format (2012)	Elysium (2012)	Electric (2013)

Singles from Elysium
- 1. "Winner" Released: 3 July 2012; 2. "Leaving" Released: 12 October 2012; 3. "Memory of the Future" Released: 31 December 2012

Elysium (/iˈlɪziəm/) is the eleventh studio album by English synth-pop duo Pet Shop Boys. Released on 5 September 2012, it was the duo's last album with Parlophone for the next 12 years. The album was recorded in 2012 in Los Angeles and produced by Andrew Dawson and Pet Shop Boys.

== Background and recording ==
"When we were trying to think of the title I kept saying if we were George Michael we'd call this album Deep, because he tends to give things a direct title. And it is deep in terms of the sound—got a lot of sub-bass—it's sort of deep in terms of subject matter, the way it's expressed. But I think it's the Pet Shop Boys' most beautiful album."

— Neil Tennant on the album's perspective.

Pet Shop Boys began writing the songs for the album in Berlin over an extended period in early 2011. Additional material was written during the Progress Live concert tour with Take That from May to July 2011. They also had two earlier songs, "Leaving" (2010) and "Requiem in Denim and Leopardskin" (2008), which became the opening and closing tracks.

The duo wanted to make the album in Los Angeles. They first approached producer Jeff Bhasker, who did not respond, and their subsequent plan to work with Cliff Martinez fell through. They became interested in working with Andrew Dawson after seeing his name in the credits for the Kanye West albums 808s & Heartbreak (2008) and My Beautiful Dark Twisted Fantasy (2010). They liked the blend of electronic music and hip-hop on 808s & Heartbreak and were looking for someone who could give a different balance and more space to their sound.

The album was recorded from January to March 2012. Pet Shop Boys wanted to use a lot of backing vocalists, and Dawson brought in two groups of singers: the Waters family, who have worked on many albums including Thriller (1982), and the a cappella group Sonos. They also drew on the talents of local session musicians, and an orchestra was recorded at Capitol Studios in Hollywood.

Elysium was conceived as a mood album as opposed to a high-energy dance record. The song "Invisible", about growing older, became a template for the mood. Chris Lowe wanted to make a reflective and downbeat record. In the end, some songs they chose with Dawson's input, such as "Winner" and "A Face Like That", did not adhere to the theme. Lowe has described Elysium as having the same feel as Behaviour (1990), but "sonically I think it's very different." The duo considered HappySad as title of the album, but came up with the word Elysium during a walk in Elysian Park in Los Angeles. Lyrically, the album can be interpreted as "about being us at our stage in our life, doing what we do", according to Neil Tennant.

== Release and promotion ==
Elysium was released in Japan on 5 September 2012, followed by Germany and most of Europe, Australia and New Zealand on 7 September; the United Kingdom, France, South America saw the release on 10 September, and the United States and Canada received it on 11 September. There are two CD formats: a single CD and a special double-CD edition which includes instrumentals of each song. A double-vinyl album was released in limited quantities which also includes the instrumental versions.

The album was re-released on 20 October 2017 (along with 2009's Yes) as Elysium: Further Listening 2011–2012. In addition to the remastered album with its original track listing, the reissue also included a second disc of B-sides, demos and remixes from the era.

=== Artwork ===
The artwork was designed by Mark Farrow, using photos of the natural world to reflect the album title. The CD cover (pictured) uses a stock photo of sunlight on the sea, and the limited double-CD cover has a photo of clouds in the sky at sunset taken by Gary Stillwell. The two photos of sea and sky were merged for the vinyl editions. The album title and artist name are on a white panel partially covering the images. The inside artwork includes a photo of Lowe and Tennant taken by Ann Summa at the duo's rented house in Los Angeles, with the gardener in the background.

=== Promotion ===
A teaser video was released in June 2012 for the track "Invisible". The short film was made by Brian Bress and the song features backing vocals by singer-songwriter James Fauntleroy II and veteran singers Oren, Julia, and Maxine Waters. Pet Shop Boys debuted the album tracks at a live-streamed concert in Berlin on 5 September 2012. Pre-recorded footage of the backing vocalists was shown on individual screens onstage.

=== Singles ===
The album's first official single, "Winner", was released digitally on 3 July 2012, and subsequently in August 2012 as a four-track CD and digital EP. The "Winner" EP includes the non-album tracks "A Certain 'Je Ne Sais Quoi'", "The Way Through the Woods" and a cover version of Bee Gees' "I Started a Joke". A second digital EP of "Winner" containing remixes by Andrew Dawson, John Dahlbäck and Niki & The Dove was released a week later.

The second single, "Leaving", was released on 12 October 2012, containing the non-album tracks "Hell" and "In His Imagination", a 2003 demo titled "Baby", a remix by Dusty Kid, two remixes by Andrew Dawson, and three remixes by the duo themselves.

"Memory of the Future" was released as the album's third and final single on 31 December 2012. A seven-inch mix was commissioned by Stuart Price, as well as remixes from Price, Ulrich Schnauss, DJ Waldo Squash and Digital Dog. It also contains three non-album tracks: "Listening", "One Night" and "Inside".

== Critical reception ==
Professional ratings
Aggregate scores
Source	Rating
AnyDecentMusic?	6.1/10
Metacritic	67/100
Review scores
Source	Rating
AllMusic	3/5 stars
Drowned in Sound	8/10
The Guardian	3/5 stars
The Independent on Sunday	4/5 stars
MSN Music (Expert Witness)	A−
musicOMH	3/5 stars
NME	6/10
Now	4/5
The Observer	3/5 stars
Pitchfork	5.4/10

Elysium received generally positive reviews from music critics. At Metacritic, which assigns a normalised rating out of 100 to reviews from mainstream publications, the album received an average score of 67, based on 20 reviews. Simon Price of The Independent on Sunday wrote, "If Elysium has a weakness, it is the absolute absence of thumping disco-pop monsters. Once you accept that, and surrender to the tranquil beauty of Chris Lowe's synth textures, you quickly realise that Neil Tennant is on top lyrical form". Robert Christgau of MSN Music quipped that although the album "may well seem too restrained", the duo are "at peace with the fate of their fame and their retirement accounts. And the understated beats suit their elysian equanimity." Kevin Ritchie of Now described the album as one of the duo's "most serene and sonically consistent efforts to date", adding that the song "Hold On" "exemplifies why Elysium is one of the year's most beautiful pop albums." Drowned in Sound's Jon Clark viewed the album as "a cohesive and strong effort that can stand up with some of [the duo's] best", calling it "a wise and knowing homage to the life of a pop star". BBC Music's Nick Levine commented that although Elysium "isn't quite a top-drawer Pets album like 1988's Introspective or 1993's Very", it "could be Pet Shop Boys' warmest, wisest album yet." Owen Myers of NME characterised the album as "a massive foamy middle-finger to retromania, running elegantly from jangly indie to kraut jabs". David Jeffries of AllMusic referred to Elysium as "an interesting, sour, and insider-aimed dispatch from backstage, interrupted by some big moments that sound entirely commissioned."

The Guardian critic Jude Rogers opined that half of the album "harks back to 1990's reflective masterpiece, Behaviour, with songs about ageing [...] and escape [...] exerting poignant pulls", but the other half "feels bitter and flippant", concluding that producer Dawson "provides a light LA gloss, but not the heavenly direction the duo deserve." In a review for The Observer, Phil Mongredien cited "Your Early Stuff" and "Ego Music" as highlights, while noting that "elsewhere [the duo are] on autopilot too often for this to be anything more than just another solid Pet Shop Boys album." Despite dubbing album opener "Leaving" "excellent", musicOMH's Laurence Green felt that "the rest of the album never materialises in the way you'd quite hope it would." Green continued, "[I]f Elysium is tainted by a slight tang of disappointment, it is a disappointment tempered in part by its recalling of Behaviour." Under the Radar's Dan Lucas complimented keyboardist Lowe's work on the album, stating, "There may be no stand-out musical line that will live long in the memory, but even more naïve melodies such as 'Winner' constantly shift and change, never growing dull." However, he criticised singer Tennant, claiming his "vocal lines often struggle to fit the songs". Douglas Wolk of Pitchfork wrote that "Tennant's mature gift as a lyricist is for sentimentality tempered by slyness, and he pulls that off a few times", but found that "[t]oo much of Elysium [...] misplaces its subtlety." Andy Gill of The Independent expressed that Elysium is "bookended by two of the best songs the Pet Shop Boys have written in years ['Leaving' and 'Requiem in Denim and Leopardskin'], but flags badly in between", naming "Hold On" the worst song on the album.

== Commercial performance ==
Elysium debuted at number nine on the UK Albums Chart, selling 10,418 copies in its first week. In the United States, Elysium debuted at number 44 on the Billboard 200 with first-week sales of 7,000 copies. It also debuted at number two on Billboard's Dance/Electronic Albums chart.

== Track listing ==
All tracks are written by Neil Tennant and Chris Lowe, except where noted.

No.	Title	Length
1.	"Leaving"	3:50
2.	"Invisible"	5:05
3.	"Winner"	3:50
4.	"Your Early Stuff"	2:33
5.	"A Face Like That"	5:07
6.	"Breathing Space"	5:10
7.	"Ego Music"	3:05
8.	"Hold On" (writers: George Frideric Handel, (Note: Music based on Eternal Source of Light Divine) Lowe, Tennant)	3:19
9.	"Give It a Go"	3:53
10.	"Memory of the Future"	4:31
11.	"Everything Means Something"	4:50
12.	"Requiem in Denim and Leopardskin"	5:49

Japanese edition bonus track
No.	Title	Length
13.	"The Way Through the Woods" (lyrics: Rudyard Kipling; music: Tennant, Lowe)	2:16

iTunes Store deluxe edition bonus content
No.	Title	Length
13.	"Elysium Track by Track" (with David Walliams)	52:03
14.	"Winner" (music video)	4:14
15.	"Invisible" (music video)	5:03

Special edition bonus disc: Elysium instrumental
No.	Title	Length
1.	"Leaving" (instrumental)	3:50
2.	"Invisible" (instrumental)	5:05
3.	"Winner" (instrumental)	3:50
4.	"Your Early Stuff" (instrumental)	2:33
5.	"A Face Like That" (instrumental)	5:07
6.	"Breathing Space" (instrumental)	5:10
7.	"Ego Music" (instrumental)	3:05
8.	"Hold On" (instrumental)	3:19
9.	"Give It a Go" (instrumental)	3:53
10.	"Memory of the Future" (instrumental)	4:31
11.	"Everything Means Something" (instrumental)	4:50
12.	"Requiem in Denim and Leopardskin" (instrumental)	5:49

Japanese limited edition bonus track
No.	Title	Length
13.	"The Way Through the Woods" (instrumental)	2:16

2017 remastered reissue bonus disc: Further Listening: 2011–2012
No.	Title	Length
1.	"Vocal" (demo)
2.	"She Pops" (demo)
3.	"Inside"
4.	"In Slow Motion" (demo)
5.	"Listening"
6.	"Hell"
7.	"The Way Through the Woods" (long version) (lyrics: Rudyard Kipling; music: Tennant, Lowe)
8.	"I Started a Joke" (writers: Barry Gibb, Maurice Gibb, Robin Gibb)
9.	"In His Imagination"
10.	"Leaving" (Believe in PSB mix)
11.	"Leaving" (Side by Side remix)
12.	"Leaving" (Freedom remix)
13.	"Memory of the Future" (New Single Mix)

== Personnel ==
Credits adapted from the liner notes of Elysium.

=== Musicians ===
- James Fauntleroy II – additional vocals (tracks 1, 2)
- Oren Waters – additional vocals (tracks 1, 2, 4, 8, 9, 12)
- Maxine Waters – additional vocals (tracks 1, 2, 4, 8, 9, 12)
- Julia Waters – additional vocals (tracks 1, 2, 4, 8, 9, 12)
- Lenny Castro – percussion (tracks 1, 9, 12)
- Joachim Horsley – orchestra arrangement, conducting (tracks 1, 3, 6, 8, 9, 12)
- Andrew Dawson – orchestra arrangement (tracks 1, 3, 6, 8, 9, 12); additional programming (tracks 3, 5, 11); guitar (tracks 3, 6); drums (track 6); keyboards (track 11)
- Ben Leathers – orchestra arrangement (tracks 1, 3, 6, 8, 9, 12)
- Mark Robertson – contractor (tracks 1, 3, 6, 8, 9, 12)
- Ryan Hoyle – drums (tracks 3, 8)
- Adam Tressler – guitar (tracks 6, 9, 12)
- Sonos – additional vocals (tracks 6–8)
- Carmen Carter – additional vocals (track 8)
- Alex Brown – additional vocals (track 8)
- Luther Waters – additional vocals (track 8)
- Vivi Rama – bass (tracks 8, 12)
- Pet Shop Boys – original orchestra arrangement (track 12)
- Pete Gleadall – additional programming

=== Orchestra ===
- Mark Robertson – violin
- Endre Granat – violin
- Ana Landauer – violin
- Peter Kent – violin
- Clayton Haslop – violin
- Sam Fischer – violin
- Neli Nikolaeva – violin
- Serena McKinney – violin
- Andrew Duckles – viola
- David Walther – viola
- Matt Funes – viola
- Jessica van Velzen Freer – viola
- David Low – cello
- Tim Landauer – cello
- Dennis Karmazyn – cello
- Victor Lawrence – cello
- Vanessa Freebairn-Smith – cello
- Jim Thatcher – French horn
- Lisa McCormick – French horn
- Rick Baptist – trumpet
- Rob Schaer – trumpet

=== Technical ===
- Andrew Dawson – production, engineering, mixing
- Pet Shop Boys – production
- Jorge Velasco – mix assistance
- Chris Athens – mastering
- Tim Young – 2017 remastering
- Mike Riley – additional vocals recording (tracks 1, 2, 4, 9, 12); engineering (track 8)
- Robert Fernandez – orchestra engineering, orchestra mixing (tracks 1, 3, 6, 8, 9, 12)
- Charlie Paakkari – string engineering assistance (tracks 1, 3, 6, 8, 9, 12)
- Max Plisskin – additional vocals recording assistance (track 2)
- Ryan Hoyle – drum recording (tracks 3, 8)
- Jim Caruana – engineering (tracks 8, 10, 11)
- Anna Ugarte – engineering assistance (tracks 8, 10, 11)
- Pete Gleadall – lead vocals recording (tracks 9, 12); additional engineering (all tracks)

=== Artwork ===
- Farrow – design, art direction
- PSB – design, art direction
- Ann Summa – PSB photograph
- Gary Stillwell – sunset photograph

== Charts ==
Chart (2012)	Peak position
Australian Albums (ARIA)	50
Austrian Albums (Ö3 Austria)	20
Belgian Albums (Ultratop Flanders)	44
Belgian Albums (Ultratop Wallonia)	17
Croatian International Albums (HDU)	35
Czech Albums (ČNS IFPI)	13
Danish Albums (Hitlisten)	15
Dutch Albums (Album Top 100)	28
Finnish Albums (Suomen virallinen lista)	2
French Albums (SNEP)	49
German Albums (Offizielle Top 100)	7
Greek Albums (IFPI)	27
Irish Albums (IRMA)	23
Italian Albums (FIMI)	41
Japanese Albums (Oricon)	52
Mexican Albums (Top 100 Mexico)	34
Norwegian Albums (VG-lista)	30
Scottish Albums (OCC)	15
Spanish Albums (Promusicae)	10
Swedish Albums (Sverigetopplistan)	12
Swiss Albums (Schweizer Hitparade)	13
UK Albums (OCC)	9
US Billboard 200	44
US Top Dance Albums (Billboard)	2

Chart (2026)	Peak position
Croatian International Albums (HDU)	10

== Release history ==
Region	Date	Format	Label	Ref.
Japan	5 September 2012	CD; digital download	EMI	
Australia	7 September 2012	CD; digital download	EMI	
Austria	7 September 2012	CD; LP; digital download	EMI	
Germany	7 September 2012	CD; LP; digital download	EMI	
Ireland	7 September 2012	CD; LP; digital download	Parlophone	
Switzerland	7 September 2012	CD; LP; digital download	EMI	
France	10 September 2012	CD; LP; digital download	EMI	
United Kingdom	10 September 2012	CD; LP; digital download	Parlophone	
Canada	11 September 2012	CD; LP; digital download	EMI	
United States	11 September 2012	CD; LP; digital download	Astralwerks	
