= Leaving (Pet Shop Boys song) =

Single by Pet Shop Boys

from the album Elysium
- B-side: "Hell"; "In His Imagination"; "Baby" (2003 demo)
- Released: 12 October 2012
- Recorded: 2012
- Genre: Synth-pop
- Length: 3:50
- Label: Parlophone
- Songwriters: Neil Tennant; Chris Lowe
- Producers: Andrew Dawson; Pet Shop Boys

Pet Shop Boys singles chronology
"Winner" (2012)	"Leaving" (2012)	"Memory of the Future" (2012)

Music video
- "Leaving" on YouTube

"Leaving" is a song by English synth-pop duo Pet Shop Boys from their eleventh studio album, Elysium (2012). It was released as the album's second single on 12 October 2012. It entered the UK Singles Chart at number 44.

== Background and recording ==
"Leaving" takes the familiar notion that "love never dies", in the context of the end of a relationship, and relates it to the memories that remain after the death of a loved one. The song was written in early 2010, and lyricist Neil Tennant drew inspiration from the loss of his parents in 2008 and 2009.

The verse "Our love is dead but the dead don't go away" came from an unreleased song titled "Heaven Is a Playground". Pet Shop Boys wrote a new chorus, and the reworked version, originally called "I'm Leaving", was earmarked for the next album. The demo is included on Yes: Further Listening 2008–2010, covering the songs from that period.

"Leaving" was recorded in Los Angeles in 2012 for Elysium. Producer Andrew Dawson gave the song what Chris Lowe called "that LA sheen". Dawson brought in veteran local musicians, including backing vocalists Oren, Julia, and Maxine Waters and James Fauntleroy to sing harmonies, and percussionist Lenny Castro.

Pet Shop Boys made three remixes of "Leaving": the Freedom remix, a club mix; the Side-by-side remix, a banging mix; and the Believe in PSB mix, an extended mix. Their remixes are included on Elysium: Further Listening 2011–2012. Dawson also made two remixes called HappySad and HappyHour.

== Artwork ==
Two different sleeves depicting each of the Pet Shop Boys were designed by Farrow and PSB, with cover photos by Pelle Crépin. The photo of Lowe (pictured) shows him in profile wearing a quilted hat by JW Anderson, with flaps covering his eyes and neck. This image is on the CD single and digital single and the 7-inch single, as well as the label of the 12-inch.

The photo of Tennant, in a bowler hat with his gloved hands covering his mouth, is on the 12-inch single and on the "Leaving Remixed" CD and digital single, along with the label of the 7-inch. Both photos are on the "Leaving Again" remixes single.

== Music video ==
A black-and-white music video, directed by David Lopez-Edwards, shows the duo performing "Leaving" at an album preview concert in Berlin on 5 September 2012. Lowe is wearing the same headgear as on the cover of the single. Oren, Julia, and Maxine Waters appear on three individual screens onstage, providing pre-recorded backing vocals. Interspersed with the concert footage are scenes around Berlin, on the S-Bahn and in train stations, inspired by the film Christiane F. (1981).

== Track listings ==
All tracks are written by Neil Tennant and Chris Lowe.

CD single / digital EP
No.	Title	Producer(s)	Length
1.	"Leaving"	Andrew Dawson; Pet Shop Boys	3:50
2.	"Hell"	Pet Shop Boys	3:33
3.	"In His Imagination"	Pet Shop Boys	4:54
4.	"Baby" (2003 demo)	Pet Shop Boys	3:47

CD single – Leaving Remixed
No.	Title	Producer(s)	Length
1.	"Leaving" (Lost Her Love remix)	Dusty Kid (remix)	11:31
2.	"Leaving" (HappySad Remix on CD)	Dawson (remix)	6:14
3.	"Leaving" (demo)	Pet Shop Boys	4:16

Digital EP – Leaving Remixed
No.	Title	Producer(s)	Length
1.	"Leaving" (Lost Her Love remix)	Dusty Kid (remix)	11:31
2.	"Leaving" (Believe in PSB remix)	Pet Shop Boys (remix)	6:44
3.	"Leaving" (demo)	Pet Shop Boys	4:16

Digital EP – Leaving Again
No.	Title	Producer(s)	Length
1.	"Leaving" (PSB Side-by-side remix)	Pet Shop Boys (remix)	7:00
2.	"Leaving" (HappySad remix)	Andrew Dawson (remix)	6:14
3.	"Leaving" (PSB Freedom remix)	Pet Shop Boys (remix)	7:05

7-inch single
No.	Title	Producer(s)	Length
1.	"Leaving"	Andrew Dawson, Pet Shop Boys	3:50
2.	"Leaving" (demo)	Pet Shop Boys	4:16

12-inch single
No.	Title	Producer(s)	Length
1.	"Leaving" (Lost Her Love remix)	Dusty Kid (remix)
2.	"Leaving" (HappySad remix)	Andrew Dawson (remix)
3.	"Leaving" (HappyHour remix)	Andrew Dawson (remix)

== Personnel ==
Credits adapted from the liner notes for Elysium: Further Listening 2011–2012 and "Leaving".

Pet Shop Boys

- Neil Tennant
- Chris Lowe

Additional musicians

- James Fauntleroy – additional vocals
- Oren Waters – additional vocals
- Maxine Waters – additional vocals
- Julia Waters – additional vocals
- Lenny Castro – percussion
- Pete Gleadall – additional programming

Orchestra

- Mark Robertson – violin
- Endre Granat – violin
- Ana Landauer – violin
- Peter Kent – violin
- Clayton Haslop – violin
- Sam Fischer – violin
- Neli Nikolaeva – violin
- Serena McKinney – violin
- Andrew Duckles – viola
- David Walther – viola
- Matt Funes – viola
- Jessica van Velzen Freer – viola
- David Low – cello
- Tim Landauer – cello
- Dennis Karmazyn – cello
- Victor Lawrence – cello
- Vanessa Freebairn-Smith – cello
- Jim Thatcher – French horn
- Lisa McCormick – French horn
- Rick Baptist – trumpet
- Rob Schaer – trumpet

Technical

- Andrew Dawson – production, engineering, mixing, orchestra arrangement
- Pete Gleadall – additional engineering
- Joachim Horsley – orchestra arrangement, conducting
- Ben Leathers – orchestra arrangement
- Mark Robertson – orchestra contractor
- Robert Fernandez – orchestra engineering, orchestra mixing
- Charlie Paakkari – string engineering assistance
- Mike Riley – additional vocals recording

Artwork

- Farrow and PSB – design, art direction
- Pelle Crépin – photography

== Charts ==
Chart performance for "Leaving"
Chart (2012–2013)	Peak position
Belgium (Ultratip Bubbling Under Flanders)	73
Belgium (Ultratip Bubbling Under Wallonia)	45
France (SNEP)	139
Germany (GfK)	35
Ireland (IRMA)	77
Japan Hot 100 (Billboard)	74
Netherlands (Single Top 100)	69
Scotland Singles (OCC)	70
UK Singles (OCC)	44
US Dance Club Songs (Billboard)	10
