= Axis (song) =

Single by Pet Shop Boys

from the album Electric
- Released: 30 April 2013
- Genre: Synth-pop; hi-NRG; Italo disco; electro house
- Length: 5:32
- Label: x2
- Songwriters: Neil Tennant; Chris Lowe
- Producer: Stuart Price

Pet Shop Boys singles chronology
"Memory of the Future" (2012)	"Axis" (2013)	"Vocal" (2013)

Music video
- "Axis" on YouTube

"Axis" is a song by English synth-pop duo Pet Shop Boys from their twelfth studio album, Electric (2013). It was released on 30 April 2013 by x2 as a preview to the album. The song was written by the duo and produced by Stuart Price.

== Background ==
"Axis" was written during the writing sessions for the duo's previous album, Elysium (2012). Chris Lowe and Neil Tennant were inspired after attending an Italo disco night in Berlin, and they composed a demo that same night. "Axis" did not suit Elysium, and Pet Shop Boys decided to make a separate dance album, Electric. The titles "Electric" and "Turn It On", from the lyrics, were considered for the album track, but the original demo name "Axis" was kept. The song was produced by Stuart Price, who used a VCS 3 to create some of the sounds on the track.

== Release ==
"Axis" was released digitally on 30 April 2013 and as a 12-inch single on 15 July 2013. The latter format includes a remix by Boys Noize, which was also released as a digital download. The single was the first release on Pet Shop Boys' own record label, x2.

=== Artwork ===
The downloadable single artwork depicts a vertical slit of coloured light bisecting a black background, like an axis, while on the remix version the line is horizontal. The design concept of "an electrical flash coming through the darkness" had been originally considered for the album cover of Electric. The imagery was inspired by the opening sequence of the music video. The 12-inch vinyl has a blue sleeve with the record label name x2 in large white type.

== Music video ==
The music video for "Axis" was created by Jude Greenaway and Luke Halls and included footage used on the Electric Tour. The record and tour promotion were combined as a practical and budgetary concern since the duo were starting their own record label.

The video begins with a vertical beam of light that becomes a tunnel through which Tennant and Lowe emerge, wearing costumes from the tour, including the black pointy hats designed for them by Gareth Pugh for the 2012 Summer Olympics opening ceremony. The tour dancers, Tom Herron and Merry Holden, also appear, at times wearing minotaur headdresses. Spin magazine remarked on the "raver-friendly visuals" and "Tron-like flashing lights".

== Live performances ==
The song was performed as the opening track on the Electric Tour in a slightly shorter and more up-tempo version.

== Track listings ==
Digital download
No.	Title	Length
1.	"Axis"	5:32

12-inch single
No.	Title	Length
1.	"Axis"	5:32
2.	"Axis" (Boys Noize remix)	4:10

== Charts ==
Chart performance for "Axis"
Chart (2013)	Peak position
Australia (ARIA)	194
UK Singles (OCC)	196
UK Indie (OCC)	25
