= Super (Pet Shop Boys album) =

2016 studio album by Pet Shop Boys

Studio album by Pet Shop Boys
- Released: 1 April 2016
- Recorded: 2015–2016
- Genre: Synth-pop
- Length: 46:33
- Label: x2
- Producer: Stuart Price

Pet Shop Boys chronology
Electric (2013)	Super (2016)	Agenda (2019)

Singles from Super
- 1. "The Pop Kids" Released: 16 February 2016; 2. "Twenty-something" Released: 24 June 2016; 3. "Inner Sanctum" Released: 22 July 2016; 4. "Say It to Me" Released: 16 September 2016; 5. "Undertow" Released: 21 April 2017

Super is the thirteenth studio album by English synth-pop duo Pet Shop Boys. It was released on 1 April 2016 on the band's own label, x2, through Kobalt Label Services. Super debuted at number three on the UK Albums Chart, and it was number one on Billboard's Top Dance/Electronic Albums chart, while lead single "The Pop Kids" topped the Billboard Dance Club Songs chart.

== Background and composition ==
Super was the second in a trilogy of albums produced by Stuart Price, preceded by Electric (2013) and followed by Hotspot (2020). As on the first album, the music on Super was purely electronic, with no additional instruments. Pet Shop Boys wrote 25 songs between November 2014 and July 2015, working in London and, mainly, Berlin. Twelve were ultimately used on the album, with an emphasis on upbeat electronic dance tracks.

"The Pop Kids" was the first song written for Super. The music originated as a demo titled "Munich", written in that city by Chris Lowe during the Progress Live tour in 2011. Neil Tennant added the lyrics during the album writing sessions, telling a story about two students and their shared love of pop music. The music of "Twenty-something" was inspired by reggaeton, which Lowe heard at a club in Bogota, while the lyrics refer to young professionals in London. "Sad Robot World" was written after the duo were given a tour of the Wolfsburg Volkswagen Plant, where they saw cars being washed by robotic arms.

Some tracks on Super are largely instrumental, with only a few lyrics and non-traditional song structures. "Pazzo!", meaning "crazy" in Italian, was made using a collection of sounds saved from another track. "Inner Sanctum" celebrates an exclusive club experience; the duo imagined how it would sound in the Berlin nightclub Berghain as they worked on it.

Tracks that were not used for Super included more conventional pop songs, as well as some dark, topical songs like "In Bits", which became a b-side of "The Pop Kids", and "The Lost Room", which was eventually released with other Super-era tracks on the Lost EP (2023).

Super was recorded in Los Angeles, where Price resided. Lowe came up with the album title, conveying an uplifting mood with an internationally recognisable word.

== Promotion and release ==
Pet Shop Boys teased Super in January 2016 with an anonymous poster and social media campaign using the circle logo (pictured), leading to the now-defunct website What Is Super, which featured a brief music clip. On 21 January, the site went live with the album announcement, along with a video preview of the song "Inner Sanctum". Super was made available for pre-order on compact disc, vinyl, or digital download; those who used the iTunes Store received an instant download of "Inner Sanctum". Additionally, the band announced a four-performance residency at the Royal Opera House, held in July 2016.

The album's opening track, "Happiness", was released as a second teaser track on 23 March 2016.

A pop-up shop was opened in London between 1 and 3 April 2016 to promote the release of the album.

=== Album cover ===
The album was released with colour variations of cover. Each format was given its own fluorescent colour scheme. The different music streaming services also have their own colour schemes.

Album covers for Super
Format	Circle colour	SUPER colour
CD	Pink	Yellow
LP	Red	Green
Digital	Green	Red
Digital (Mastered for iTunes)	Yellow	Blue
Streaming (Apple Music, Deezer, Spotify)	Blue	Pink

== Singles ==
On 16 February 2016, "The Pop Kids" was released as the album's lead single. A CD single and a digital extended play were released on 18 March, featuring two remixes of "The Pop Kids" and two new tracks, "In Bits" and "One-Hit Wonder". A white vinyl 12-inch with five remixes of the song was released on 27 May. "The Pop Kids" reached number one on the UK Physical Singles Chart but missed out on the UK Top 100 at number 128. It peaked at number one on the Billboard Dance Club Songs chart.

On 24 June, "Twenty-something" was released as the album's second single on CD and download, featuring the single edit, two remixes, and two new tracks, "The White Dress" and "Wiedersehen"; the latter featured backing vocals by Rufus Wainwright. It debuted at number one on the UK Physical Singles Chart. For the music video, released on 10 May, Pet Shop Boys chose director Gavin Filipiak, who had directed the video of a cover version of "West End Girls" by the cholo goth group Prayers. The "Twenty-something" video follows a Latino man in San Diego, struggling to reintegrate into society after being incarcerated. It won the San Diego Film Award for Best Music Video.

On 22 July, "Inner Sanctum" was released on 12-inch vinyl to celebrate their sold out shows at the Royal Opera House in London. The 4-track vinyl release featured the Carl Craig C2 Juiced RMX, two demo versions of the song, and the album version. The Carl Craig remix was also released digitally.

On 16 September, "Say It to Me" was released on CD and on two separate digital bundles. The first included an alternate mix of the song, as well as two new tracks, "A Cloud in a Box" and "The Dead Can Dance". The second bundle included remixes by Tom Demac, Real Lies, and Offer Nissim. A 12-inch vinyl format was released a week later. The song entered the Billboard Dance Club Chart at number 31 the week of 29 October, and on 10 December the song reached number four. It debuted at number one on the UK Physical Singles Chart. No promotional video was created for "Say It to Me", and it was not performed on the Super Tour.

Originally, "Burn" was planned as the fourth and final single, however, these plans were cancelled following the Ghost Ship warehouse fire.

On 1 April 2017, a three-track CD of "Undertow" was released exclusively with orders of the new Annually fan publication. A four-track vinyl 12-inch was released commercially on 21 April, the same day as the three-track digital download. The CD and digital download contained new remixes of "Undertow" and "Burn" by Tuff City Kids and Baba Stiltz respectively, as well as a new studio version of "Left to My Own Devices". The vinyl single included these three tracks and added "Undertow" (Tuff City Kids dub).

== Reception ==
=== Critical reception ===
Professional ratings
Aggregate scores
Source	Rating
AnyDecentMusic?	7.0/10
Metacritic	75/100
Review scores
Source	Rating
Attitude	8/10
Consequence of Sound	C+
Drowned in Sound	8/10
Evening Standard	4/5 stars
Exclaim!	7/10
The Guardian	4/5 stars
MusicOMH	4/5 stars
PopMatters	9/10
Rolling Stone Russia	5/5 stars
Slant Magazine	3.5/5 stars

Super received generally favourable reviews from music critics. The album earned a 75 Metascore from Metacritic based on 22 reviews.

Martyn Young of DIY gave Super 4 out of 5 stars and described it as "a record that's frequently playful, vibrant and witty and shows off all the hallmarks of classic Pet Shop Boys… 'Super' is confirmation of their position at the head of the pop pantheon with an album brimming with excitement and fizzing with energy". The 4-star AllMusic review by David Jeffries compared Super to its predecessor, Electric, stating: "The musical landscape is the same and still, it's not a sequel or a very proper follow-up. It feels confident, loose, and free like a swaggering epilogue, like the smaller Quantum of Solace following the epic Casino Royale... while Super scores as high as the crossover-ish Electric, it's built more for the fan who puts 'Paninaro' at the top of their list, well ahead of 'West End Girls'".

The album received a 7 out of 10 from The Line of Best Fit's Tom Hocknell, who wrote: "Super is a grower – a brave rejection of pipe and slippers, embracing the mythical dance floor with admirably vacuous experimentation, even if it mines the mid-nineties, when dance music grew least interesting. It veers from the irritating to the irresistible. The good songs could easily be extended, while others shortened, if not removed completely". The Telegraph headline asked, "Time for the Pet Shop Boys to leave the party?" with reviewer Helen Brown giving the album 3 out of 5 stars, noting: "At times, though, the bleepy, burbling "fun" gets too wacky and cheesy for even PSB's long-standing irony to uphold. Too many tracks sound like they've been spun out of ringtones". But she observed, "The brand is established. The fans will buy in. Or they won't. Either way, the "boys" will keep calm, carry on and have a cuppa".

=== Commercial performance ===
The album debuted at number three on the UK Albums Chart, selling 16,953 copies in its first week, becoming their 13th consecutive top 10 studio album. In the United States, Super debuted at number 58 on the Billboard 200 with first-week sales of 10,000 copies. It also debuted at number one on Billboard's Dance/Electronic Albums chart, becoming Pet Shop Boys' first number-one album on the chart since Disco 3 (2003).

== Concert tour ==
The album was supported by the Super Tour, with performances in Europe, North and South America, and Asia between 2016 and 2019. The production was designed by Es Devlin. Pet Shop Boys played two separate residencies at the Royal Opera House in July 2016 and July 2018. A concert film from the 2018 dates was released on DVD and Blu-ray, accompanied by a live album on CD, under the title Inner Sanctum.

== Track listing ==
All tracks are written by Neil Tennant and Chris Lowe, except "Say It to Me" written by Neil Tennant, Chris Lowe, and Stuart Price.

Super track listing
No.	Title	Length
1.	"Happiness"	4:04
2.	"The Pop Kids"	3:55
3.	"Twenty-something"	4:22
4.	"Groovy"	3:29
5.	"The Dictator Decides"	4:50
6.	"Pazzo!"	2:44
7.	"Inner Sanctum"	4:18
8.	"Undertow"	4:15
9.	"Sad Robot World"	3:18
10.	"Say It to Me"	3:08
11.	"Burn"	3:53
12.	"Into Thin Air"	4:17
Total length:		46:33

== Personnel ==
- Pet Shop Boys – performers and programming
- Stuart Price – production, mixing and additional programming
- Jessica Freedman – additional vocals on "Undertow"
- Nayanna Holley – additional vocals on "Burn"

== Charts ==
=== Weekly charts ===
Weekly chart performance for Super
Chart (2016)	Peak position
Australian Albums (ARIA)	12
Austrian Albums (Ö3 Austria)	8
Belgian Albums (Ultratop Flanders)	21
Belgian Albums (Ultratop Wallonia)	27
Canadian Albums (Billboard)	35
Croatian International Albums (HDU)	21
Czech Albums (ČNS IFPI)	2
Danish Albums (Hitlisten)	27
Dutch Albums (Album Top 100)	13
Finnish Albums (Suomen virallinen lista)	8
French Albums (SNEP)	39
German Albums (Offizielle Top 100)	3
Greek Albums (IFPI)	24
Irish Albums (IRMA)	16
Irish Independent Albums (IRMA)	3
Italian Albums (FIMI)	20
Japanese Albums (Oricon)	47
Norwegian Albums (VG-lista)	28
Polish Albums (ZPAV)	48
Scottish Albums (OCC)	5
Spanish Albums (PROMUSICAE)	7
Swedish Albums (Sverigetopplistan)	10
Swiss Albums (Schweizer Hitparade)	4
UK Albums (OCC)	3
UK Independent Albums (OCC)	2
US Billboard 200	58
US Independent Albums (Billboard)	5
US Top Dance Albums (Billboard)	1

=== Year-end charts ===
Year-end chart performance for Super
Chart (2016)	Position
US Dance/Electronic Albums (Billboard)	14

== Sales ==
Sales for Super
Region	Certification	Certified units/sales
United Kingdom	—	33,041
United States	—	20,000
