= Wildlife control =

Wildlife Control may refer to:

- Wildlife Control (band), an American indie rock band from Brooklyn, NY and San Francisco, CA
- Nuisance wildlife management, the term given to the process of selective removal of problem individuals or populations of certain species of wildlife

== See also ==
- Wildlife Services, a program that provides Federal leadership and skill to resolve wildlife interactions that threaten public health and safety
- Wildlife management attempts to balance the needs of wildlife with the needs of people using the best available science
