= Steven Roesler =

American talent manager

- Born: Steven Roesler; Buffalo, New York, U.S.
- Genres: Indie rock, garage rock, alternative pop
- Occupation: Talent manager
- Years active: 2011-present
- Website: roeslermgmt.com

Steven Roesler is an American talent manager who founded Roesler Management, a talent management and marketing company based in Los Angeles, California. Roesler was born and raised in Buffalo, New York and began his career in the music industry managing his friends' bands, founding his company in 2012.

== Career ==
In Florida in 2012 he founded his artist management company.

In 2013 he signed the bands Street Joy and Wildlife Control.

He was also a management consultant to the band Simian Ghost.

== Personal life ==
In 2011, Roesler moved from Buffalo, New York to Gainesville, Florida. He lives in Tampa, Florida.
