= Bolshy =

Bolshy may refer to:

- "Bolshy", a song on Electric (Pet Shop Boys album)
- Alternative spelling of Bolshie, slang for a Bolshevik, or for someone who is rebellious or truculent
