= Thursday (Pet Shop Boys song) =

Single by Pet Shop Boys featuring Example

from the album Electric
- B-side: "No More Ballads"; "Odd Man Out"
- Released: 4 November 2013
- Genre: Pop
- Length: 5:02
- Label: x2
- Songwriters: Neil Tennant; Chris Lowe; Elliot Gleave
- Producer: Stuart Price

Pet Shop Boys singles chronology
"Love Is a Bourgeois Construct" (2013)	"Thursday" (2013)	"Fluorescent" (2014)

Example singles chronology
"All the Wrong Places" (2013)	"Thursday" (2013)	"Kids Again" (2014)

Music video
- "Thursday" on YouTube

"Thursday" is a song by English synth-pop duo Pet Shop Boys, featuring vocals from English singer and rapper Example. It was released on 4 November 2013 as the fourth single from the Pet Shop Boys' twelfth studio album, Electric (2013). The song reached number 61 on the UK Singles Chart and is the highest-charting single from the album.

== Background and composition ==
Chris Lowe wrote the original demo for the song and gave it a temporary title, "Thursday Night Special". He commented that Thursday is "the new Friday"—a special night to go out. The songs for Electric were recorded in alphabetical order, and Neil Tennant decided "Thursday" fit well in the sequence and wrote lyrics about anticipating the weekend.

The duo wanted to use a rap on "Thursday", and they put a sample of Nicki Minaj on the track at first for an idea of how it would sound. Stuart Price, the producer of Electric, was also working with the rapper Example, who agreed to collaborate on the song. In addition to the rap, Example sang his own chorus, "I never tried to make you walk into the deep end…" Tennant's original chorus was "Thursday then Friday, it's soon gonna be the weekend…" The duo added another chorus based on Example's: "It's Thursday night, let's get it right…" Lowe also recited a list of days: "Thursday, Friday, Saturday, Sunday".

== Release ==
"Thursday" was released on CD single and in two digital bundles on 4 November 2013. Both physical and digital formats include remixes by Tensnake and Eddie Amador, as well as two previously unreleased B-sides, "No More Ballads" and "Odd Man Out". A twelve-inch single was released on 9 December 2013.

=== Artwork ===
The sleeve for the single was designed by Mark Farrow, with photography by John Ross. The image (pictured) features the disco ball-style headwear designed by Jeffrey Bryant, which Lowe wore during the Electric Tour. The green text is on a diagonal, the same as on the other releases from Electric.

== Critical reception ==
"Thursday" was mentioned in several reviews of Electric. Kenny McGuane of Under the Radar called it "one of the best Pet Shop Boys songs of the last 20 years". Thom Gibbs of NME described the song as beginning "with a resurrection of the tragic synth wash of 'West End Girls' before unfolding into an irresistible disco explosion". Alexis Petridis of The Guardian wrote: "Thursday, meanwhile, not only features a gorgeous combination of squelching bass and drifting, misty clouds of synthesisers and the reliable source of joy that is Chris Lowe taking to the microphone in stone-faced, Lancashire-vowelled Paninaro style, but rapper Example, who you might have been forgiven for thinking was precisely the kind of pop star Ego Music took aim at… but there's something striking about how his cocksure verse contrasts with the wistful neediness of Tennant's vocal".

== Music video ==
The accompanying music video was filmed in Shanghai, China, when Pet Shop Boys performed there during the Electric Tour in August 2013. Example makes a cameo in the video, with images of the musicians projected on buildings around the city. The Oregonian described the video as featuring "not only two orange, Dali-esque women dancing in a busy intersection but a man with a disco ball for a head, naming all the days of a four-day weekend. It's fun with a side of social commentary."

== Live performances ==
The song was performed on the Electric Tour with Example's section projected on a big screen behind the band. Example joined them onstage at their tour date at The O2 Arena, London, on 18 June 2013.

== Usage in other media ==
The song was played over the end credits of an episode of Looking.

== Track listings ==
"Thursday" is written by Neil Tennant, Chris Lowe, and Elliot Gleave (aka Example). All other songs are by Tennant/Lowe.

CD single / digital bundle 1
No.	Title	Length
1.	"Thursday" (radio edit)	3:56
2.	"No More Ballads"	3:44
3.	"Odd Man Out"	3:46
4.	"Thursday" (Tensnake remix)	5:58

Digital bundle 2
No.	Title	Length
1.	"Thursday" (no rap radio edit)	3:32
2.	"Thursday" (Eddie Amador remix)	6:45
3.	"Thursday" (Mindskap remix)	5:55

12-inch single
No.	Title	Length
1.	"Thursday" (album mix)	5:02
2.	"Thursday" (Eddie Amador remix)	6:45
3.	"Thursday" (Tensnake remix)	5:58

=== Notes ===
"Odd Man Out" includes a spoken-word sample by Charles Lloyd-Pack from the 1961 film Victim.

== Personnel ==
Credits adapted from the liner notes of Electric and "Thursday".

Pet Shop Boys

- Chris Lowe
- Neil Tennant

Additional musicians

- Example – featured vocals
- Jessica Freedman – additional vocals
- Katharine Anne Hoye – additional vocals
- Stuart Price – additional programming

Technical personnel

- Stuart Price – production, engineering, mixing
- Simon Davey – mastering

Artwork

- Farrow and PSB – design and art direction
- John Ross – photography
- Jeffrey Bryant – headwear design

== Charts ==
Chart performance for "Thursday"
Chart (2013–2014)	Peak position
Belgium (Ultratip Bubbling Under Flanders)	61
Scotland Singles (OCC)	86
UK Singles (OCC)	61
UK Indie (OCC)	7
US Dance Club Songs (Billboard)	17
US Hot Dance/Electronic Songs (Billboard)	36
