= Say It to Me =

Single by Pet Shop Boys

from the album Super
- B-side: "A Cloud in a Box"; "The Dead Can Dance"
- Released: 16 September 2016
- Genre: Balearic beat; Eurodance; house
- Length: 3:08
- Label: x2
- Songwriters: Neil Tennant; Chris Lowe; Stuart Price
- Producer: Stuart Price

Pet Shop Boys singles chronology
"Inner Sanctum" (2016)	"Say It to Me" (2016)	"Undertow" (2017)

"Say It to Me" is a song by English synth-pop duo Pet Shop Boys from their thirteenth studio album, Super (2016). It was released on 16 September 2016 as the album's fourth single. The single debuted at number one on the UK Physical Singles chart, and it reached number four on Billboard magazine's Dance Club Songs chart and number five on the Hot Singles Sales chart in the US. The song did not have a music video to accompany it, and was not included in the set list for their 2016 Super Tour.

== Background and composition ==
"Say It to Me" was built around the bassline, which Chris Lowe compared to the sound of the American group Inner City. Lowe suggested that Neil Tennant come up with a repeated phrase, in the manner of Caribou, whose album Our Love (2014) they had enjoyed. Tennant described "Say It to Me" as "about a relationship with someone who doesn't say very much, someone with rather an elusive personality".

Producer Stuart Price did additional work on the song and received a writing credit. The duo originally had not intended to include "Say It to Me" on Super but were persuaded to do so by Price.

== Release ==
"Say It to Me" was chosen as a single after it became a fan favourite from the album. It was the third official single from Super, following the limited edition vinyl single of "Inner Sanctum". "Say It to Me" was released on 16 September 2016 on CD single and in two digital bundles, including remixes by Real Lies, Tom Demac, Offer Nissim and Stuart Price, as well as two previously unreleased B-sides, "A Cloud in a Box" and "The Dead Can Dance". A twelve-inch single was released on 23 September. The cover art was a take on the album art for Super, the title centred in a circle, but designed to look like a dialogue bubble from a comic.

== Critical reception ==
"Say It to Me" was mentioned in some album reviews of Super. Chris Snoddon of the music website XS Noize wrote: "Say It to Me follows, kicking in with a Balearic beat prior to emerging as another house styled track this time in the guise of Italian Euro-dance act Livin' Joy sporting similarities to their anthemic chorus accompaniment featured on 94's dance floor filler Dreamer". A reviewer with ABC News in the US called the song "achingly tense (but tremendously catchy)" and described it as "a bonafide club hit waiting to happen while Tennant relentlessly pleads, "Tell me what you want from me!" It mixes a club-ready beat with an appealing pop hook. Honestly, this really deserves "Top 40" radio spins".

In contrast, Jon O'Brien of Attitude called the track "slightly pedestrian", and Kitty Empire of The Guardian characterized it as "coasting on overfamiliar autopilot".

== Track listings ==
- CD single
1. "Say It to Me" (new radio mix) – 3:11
2. "A Cloud in a Box" – 4:09
3. "The Dead Can Dance" – 2:57
4. "Say It to Me" (Stuart Price alternative mix) – 3:35
5. "Inner Sanctum" (Carl Craig c2 Juiced rmx) – 7:09
- Digital EP
1. "Say It to Me" (new radio mix) – 3:11
2. "A Cloud in a Box" – 4:09
3. "The Dead Can Dance" – 2:57
4. "Say It to Me" (Stuart Price alternative mix) – 3:35
- Digital single – Remixes
1. "Say It to Me" (Tom Demac remix) – 7:23
2. "Say It to Me" (Real Lies remix) – 5:00
3. "Say It to Me" (Offer Nissim remix) – 5:00
- 12-inch single

A1. "Say It to Me" (Real Lies Remix) – 5:00
A2. "Say It to Me" (Tom Demac Remix) – 7:24
B1. "Say It to Me" (Offer Nissim Mix) – 5:00
B2. "Say It to Me" (Stuart Price alternative mix) – 3:35

== Personnel ==
Credits are adapted from the liner notes of "Say It to Me".

Pet Shop Boys

- Chris Lowe
- Neil Tennant

Additional personnel

- Stuart Price – production, engineering, additional programming and keyboards
- Pete Gleadall – engineering
- Tim Young – mastering
- Farrow/PSB – design, art direction

== Charts ==
Chart performance for "Say It to Me"
Chart (2016)	Peak position
France (SNEP)	115
UK Indie (OCC)	40
UK Physical Singles (OCC)	1
US Dance Club Songs (Billboard)	4
US Dance/Electronic Digital Song Sales (Billboard)	41
US Hot Dance/Electronic Songs (Billboard)	35
US Hot Singles Sales (Billboard)	5
