= Electric (Pet Shop Boys album) =

Studio album by Pet Shop Boys
- Released: 14 July 2013
- Recorded: November 2012 – April 2013
- Genre: EDM; synth-pop; electro house; dance-pop; techno
- Length: 49:12
- Label: x2
- Producer: Stuart Price

Pet Shop Boys chronology
Elysium (2012)	Electric (2013)	Super (2016)

Singles from Electric
- 1. "Axis" Released: 30 April 2013; 2. "Vocal" Released: 3 June 2013; 3. "Love Is a Bourgeois Construct" Released: 2 September 2013; 4. "Thursday" Released: 4 November 2013; 5. "Fluorescent" Released: 19 April 2014

Electric is the twelfth studio album by English synth-pop duo Pet Shop Boys. It was released on 14 July 2013 on the duo's own label, x2, through Kobalt Label Services as the duo's first album since their departure from Parlophone. Electric was the first in a trilogy of albums produced by Stuart Price, followed by Super and Hotspot. The single "Thursday" features a collaboration with English singer and rapper Example.

Electric reached number three on the UK Albums Chart and number 26 on the US Billboard 200, the duo's highest chart performances in both territories in 20 years. The album was supported by the Electric Tour which visited 46 countries through 112 concerts.

== Background and recording ==
Electric was completed less than a year after the Pet Shop Boys' previous album, Elysium. They had several unused songs, including "Axis", "Vocal", "Inside a Dream", "Shouting in the Evening", and a cover version of Bruce Springsteen's "The Last to Die". Their intention was to make a dance record, and they enlisted Stuart Price, the music producer of their Pandemonium Tour, who had remixed the last single from Elysium, "Memory of the Future". As they added new material, the project developed into a full-fledged album.

Price stated that his goal was for every track to have a "euphoric, fresh feel to it". The more dance-influenced nature of Electric was a response to the "reflective mood" of Elysium. Neil Tennant commented, "Elysium was about growing old; Electric is about remembering that sense of youthful excitement". The album title was chosen "because that's what it is—electronic music that we hope is exciting."

Pet Shop Boys recorded the album between November 2012 and April 2013. They worked at Price's London studio for the first few months. Later in the process, Price was in Los Angeles, and the duo exchanged material with him from London and Berlin. Price decided to record the songs in alphabetical order, starting with "Axis" and ending with "Vocal", which was finished on the day the album was scheduled to be completed. "Fluorescent" was added as a ninth track during the last month of recording after Chris Lowe sent Tennant a demo. Price finished mixing the album in late April.

== Release ==
Electric is the first Pet Shop Boys studio album that was not released through Parlophone, after 28 years with the label. Pet Shop Boys announced the launch of their own label, x2, in partnership with Kobalt Label Services, for Electric and future releases. Chris Lowe was given credit for the name x2, pronounced "times two".

The album was released in the UK on 14 July 2013 on CD, digital download, and LP formats. Germany, Austria, Switzerland, Netherlands, Belgium, Luxembourg, Australia, and New Zealand had an earlier release date of 12 July; and in the United States, Canada, South America, Spain, and most other countries, the album was released 16 July.

A limited-edition LP boxset from The Vinyl Factory was announced in July and released in December 2013. The five-disc coloured vinyl set had one song per side and a blank side signed by Tennant and Lowe. The pressing was limited to 350 copies, and The Electric Box became a collector's item, with one selling for $2,243 on Discogs in 2023.

=== Artwork ===
The album cover features a blue zigzag pattern on a white background. The pattern represents a lightning strike in an op art style. The artist name and album title do not appear on the cover. It was designed by Mark Farrow, with input from his colleague Fred Ross, with a focus on how the image would look on a smartphone screen. Tennant chose the colour blue as a reference to the lyric "Blue, blue, electric blue" in the David Bowie song "Sound and Vision" (1977).

The limited-edition boxset included five heavyweight vinyl records in different fluorescent colours—orange, yellow, pink, green, and white—housed in a transparent, multi-coloured acrylic box with fluoroscent-edges. The intended effect was a glowing prism. The set came with assembly instructions and white gloves for handling the discs, along with an insert listing the tracks and credits.

=== Promotion ===
On 14 March 2013, Pet Shop Boys debuted a short trailer for Electric on YouTube. The entire album was made available for streaming in the United Kingdom via The Guardian on 9 July.

In support of the album, the duo embarked on the Electric Tour, which began on 22 March 2013 at the Cumbre Tajín festival in Veracruz, Mexico, where they debuted two songs from the album: "Axis" and their cover version of Springsteen's "The Last to Die". The tour's first official date took place at the Movistar Arena in Santiago, Chile, on 13 May 2013. The setlist featured songs from the forthcoming album, including "Vocal" as the final encore.

=== Singles ===
On 30 April 2013, immediately following the official album announcement, "Axis" premiered with a video and digital release. The Boys Noize remix of the song was released on 14 May.

The single "Vocal" premiered on 1 June 2013 on DJ Dave Pearce's BBC Radio 2 show Dance Years, followed by a digital release on 3 June. A CD single and digital download were released on 29 July, featuring new remixes of the song, and a 12-inch vinyl single was released on 9 December.

"Love Is a Bourgeois Construct" was released as a single on 2 September 2013. The single contains remixes and two B-sides, "Entschuldigung!" and "Get It Online".

The single "Thursday" was released on 4 November 2013, with remixes and two B-sides, "No More Ballads", "Odd Man Out". The video footage for the video was shot in Shanghai.

"Fluorescent" was released as a limited edition 12-inch vinyl to celebrate Record Store Day 2014 on 19 April.

== Reception ==
=== Critical reception ===
Professional ratings
Aggregate scores
Source	Rating
AnyDecentMusic?	7.7/10
Metacritic	84/100
Review scores
Source	Rating
AllMusic	4/5 stars
The Daily Telegraph	5/5 stars
The Guardian	4/5 stars
The Independent	4/5 stars
Los Angeles Times	3.5/4 stars
NME	8/10
Pitchfork	7.0/10
Q	4/5 stars
Rolling Stone	3.5/5 stars
Spin	8/10

Electric received widespread acclaim from music critics. At Metacritic, which assigns a normalised rating out of 100 to reviews from mainstream publications, the album received an average score of 84, based on 28 reviews, which indicates "universal acclaim". Dorian Lynskey of Q praised several songs on the album and noted, "With Electric, Pet Shop Boys have succeeded spectacularly." Simon Price, music critic for the Independent on Sunday, described the album as "sublime". Neil McCormick of The Daily Telegraph commented that "Electric is the second really fantastic pop-dance blast of the year".

=== Commercial performance ===
The album debuted at number three in the United Kingdom on the UK Albums Chart, selling 15,715 copies in its first week, becoming Pet Shop Boys' highest-charting studio album in the UK since Very topped the chart in 1993.

In the United States, Electric debuted at number 26 on the Billboard 200, with first-week sales of 11,000 copies, becoming the duo's highest-charting US album since Very peaked at number 20 in 1993. It also debuted at number two on Billboard's Dance/Electronic Albums chart.

== Track listing ==
All tracks are written by Neil Tennant and Chris Lowe, except where noted.

No.	Title	Length
1.	"Axis"	5:32
2.	"Bolshy"	5:44
3.	"Love Is a Bourgeois Construct" (writers: Tennant, Lowe, Henry Purcell)	6:41
4.	"Fluorescent"	6:14
5.	"Inside a Dream"	5:37
6.	"The Last to Die" (writer: Bruce Springsteen)	4:12
7.	"Shouting in the Evening"	3:36
8.	"Thursday" (featuring Example; writers: Tennant, Lowe, Elliot Gleave)	5:02
9.	"Vocal"	6:34

Japanese edition bonus tracks
No.	Title	Length
10.	"Axis" (Boys Noize remix)	4:10
11.	"Axis" (Boys Noize Dub remix)	4:10

Notes

- "Inside a Dream" includes a quotation from "The Land of Dreams" by William Blake (1757–1827)

== Personnel ==
Credits adapted from the liner notes of Electric.

Pet Shop Boys

- Neil Tennant
- Chris Lowe

Additional musicians

- Elliot Gleave – vocals (8)
- Stuart Price – additional programming (all tracks); additional vocals (3)
- Andy Crookston – additional vocals (3)
- Pete Gleadall – additional vocals (3); additional programming (3, 6, 9)
- Luke Halls – additional vocals (3)
- Jessica Freedman – additional vocals (8)
- Katharine Anne Hoye – additional vocals (8)
- Adam Blake – handclaps (5)

Technical

- Stuart Price – production, engineering, mixing
- Pete Gleadall – additional engineering (3, 6, 9); additional vocals recording (3)
- Brian Gardner – mastering
- Farrow – design, art direction
- PSB – design, art direction
- John Ross – photography

== Charts ==
Weekly chart performance for Electric
Chart (2013)	Peak position
Australian Albums (ARIA)	24
Austrian Albums (Ö3 Austria)	13
Belgian Albums (Ultratop Flanders)	25
Belgian Albums (Ultratop Wallonia)	20
Canadian Albums (Billboard)	21
Czech Albums (ČNS IFPI)	4
Danish Albums (Hitlisten)	2
Dutch Albums (Album Top 100)	15
Estonian Albums (Raadio 2)	5
Finnish Albums (Suomen virallinen lista)	5
French Albums (SNEP)	34
German Albums (Offizielle Top 100)	3
Greek Albums (IFPI)	51
Hungarian Albums (MAHASZ)	40
Irish Albums (IRMA)	18
Irish Independent Albums (IRMA)	3
Italian Albums (FIMI)	37
Norwegian Albums (VG-lista)	1
Polish Albums (ZPAV)	50
Scottish Albums (OCC)	10
Spanish Albums (Promusicae)	5
Swedish Albums (Sverigetopplistan)	11
Swiss Albums (Schweizer Hitparade)	6
UK Albums (OCC)	3
UK Independent Albums (OCC)	1
US Billboard 200	26
US Independent Albums (Billboard)	2
US Top Dance Albums (Billboard)	2
