= Memory of the Future =

Single by Pet Shop Boys

from the album Elysium
- B-side: "Listening"; "One Night"; "Inside"
- Released: 31 December 2012
- Recorded: 2012
- Genre: Electro
- Length: 4:31
- Label: Parlophone
- Songwriters: Neil Tennant; Chris Lowe
- Producers: Andrew Dawson; Pet Shop Boys

Pet Shop Boys singles chronology
"Leaving" (2012)	"Memory of the Future" (2012)	"Axis" (2013)

Music video
- "Memory of the Future" (lyric video) on YouTube

"Memory of the Future" is a song by English synth-pop duo Pet Shop Boys from their eleventh studio album, Elysium (2012). It was released on 31 December 2012 as the album's third and final single. The track reached number 68 in Germany and number 111 in the United Kingdom. The single version was remixed by Stuart Price and differs notably from the album version.

== Composition and recording ==
"Memory of the Future" was composed during a song-writing session in Berlin in 2011. Lyricist Neil Tennant described it as a straightforward love song about "something that hasn't happened seeming so inevitable that it already feels like a memory". The line "I keep tasting that sweet madeleine" is a reference to the French novel Remembrance of Things Past by Marcel Proust, in which the taste of a madeleine (a small cake) prompts an involuntary memory of the narrator's childhood.

The song was recorded for the album in 2012 with producer Andrew Dawson. For the single, Stuart Price was asked to make a more electronic version. In addition to the differences in the arrangement, the single is approximately a minute shorter than the album version and has a faster tempo. After the release of "Memory of the Future", Pet Shop Boys went on to work with Price on a trilogy of albums starting with Electric.

== Artwork ==
The single cover featured Tennant and Lowe with blond wigs and blue-tinted eyes, in a look loosely inspired by the science fiction horror film Children of the Damned (1964). The idea was to convey a futuristic look. The photo was taken by Pelle Crépin with retouching by Ashish Karora. The duo's faces are bisected, with one half on each of the two CDs. The primary CD (pictured) has Tennant on the left and Lowe on the right, and remix CD has the reverse. The promo CD had a blue sleeve that was shortened to show part of the disc at the top.

== Music video ==
The single was promoted with a lyric video. Social media had created a demand for videos and the lyric format had become popular at the time. The text scrolls up the screen in a manner similar to the introduction of Star Wars (1977).

== Track listings ==
CD single / digital download
No.	Title	Length
1.	"Memory of the Future" (new single mix)	3:36
2.	"Listening"	4:19
3.	"One Night"	4:06
4.	"Inside"	2:54

CD single – Remixed
No.	Title	Length
1.	"Memory of the Future" (Stuart Price Extended Mix)	5:23
2.	"Memory of the Future" (Ulrich Schnauss Remix)	4:37
3.	"Memory of the Future" (DJ Waldo Squash Remix)	4:00
4.	"Memory of the Future" (Digital Dog Club Remix)	6:19
5.	"Memory of the Future" (Digital Dog Dub)	5:35

== Charts ==
Chart performance for "Memory of the Future"
Chart (2013)	Peak position
Germany (GfK)	68
UK Singles (OCC)	111
US Dance Singles Sales (Billboard)	1
US Hot Singles Sales (Billboard)	2
