= David Cicero =

- Born: May 29, 1970 (age 55)
- Origin: Greenport, New York, United States
- Genres: Synth-pop; dance; electropop; electronica
- Occupations: Singer; musician; keyboardist
- Instruments: Vocals; keyboards
- Years active: 1989–present
- Labels: Spaghetti (1989–1996); Clubscene (1996–present); Academy Street (1996–present)
- Website: Official Website

David John Cicero (born May 29, 1970, Greenport, New York, United States) is a Scottish-American singer and keyboardist who was signed in 1991 to Spaghetti Records, a record label owned by Pet Shop Boys. Releasing material as Cicero, he went on to have minor success in the early 1990s.

== Career ==
Cicero was born in Long Island, but when his parents divorced, he moved to Livingston, Scotland. In 1987, his school band Pneumatic Beat came third in a Battle of the Bands competition encouraging Cicero to become a musician full time. In 1989, he attended a Pet Shop Boys concert in Glasgow and gave a demo tape to Peter Andreas, Pet Shop Boys' personal assistant. Andreas contacted Cicero with an offer of artist management and later, when Neil Tennant and Chris Lowe heard Cicero's material, they signed him up to their recently formed Spaghetti label, licensed through Polydor.

Cicero released his debut single "Heaven Must Have Sent You Back to Me" on August 12, 1991. Despite promotion from the artist and Pet Shop Boys, the single failed to chart. The follow-up, "Love Is Everywhere", reached number 19 in the UK Singles Chart in January 1992 and may have charted higher, as Cicero saw his Top of the Pops slot dropped at the last minute to make room for Michael Jackson's 10-minute video for "Black or White". The third single release was "That Loving Feeling" which reached number 46 in April 1992. The latter two singles were co-produced by Pet Shop Boys.

His debut album, Future Boy, was released in June 1992. The album was produced by David Jacob, with the exceptions of "Love Is Everywhere" and "That Loving Feeling", which were produced by Pet Shop Boys, and "Cloud 9" and "Sonic Malfunction", which Cicero produced himself. Pet Shop Boys also remixed "Heaven Must Have Sent You Back to Me" for the album, and also received keyboard and backing vocal credit for the album. The album did not chart, but to promote it, a new version of "Heaven Must Have Sent You Back to Me" was released as the fourth single and charted at number 70. The music video for the single was directed by Chris Lowe.

On November 2, 1992, Cicero released a fifth single "Live for Today" with Sylvia Mason-James providing backing vocals. The single was taken from the Pet Shop Boys produced soundtrack to the film, The Crying Game, but it failed to chart. The following year, after the success of the title track, sung by Boy George, it was planned to re-release the single, but this never happened.

Cicero released nothing further through Spaghetti Records, although he was still signed with them until 1996. The Pet Shop Boys' fan club magazine regularly gave updates about him, saying that he was working on new tracks.

By late 1996, with Marianne Murphy becoming the lead singer on all of his Eurodance releases, Cicero moved to Clubscene Records, later merged into Academy Street Records in Scotland and his brother Mike took over as manager. He supported Take That on tour.

Cicero featured as one of the mystery guests in the episode of Never Mind the Buzzcocks, broadcast on October 9, 2008 on BBC Two.

In 2019, he played his first gig in 28 years, a benefit for Macmillan Cancer Support in Livingston.

In 2021, he released Today the follow-up to Future Boy, his first new album in 29 years, which included "In the Rain (Children of Today)", a single recorded with his 8-year-old daughter Holly and "Wish" with Amy Maeve Ballie, a Livingston-based artist who plays in Cicero's band. In 2022, Cicero released an instrumental album project called Atmospheric with singles such as "When Love Fades Away".

== Discography ==
=== Albums ===
- Future Boy (Spaghetti / Polydor) (1992)
- Future Boy – The Complete Works (Cherry Red / Strike Force Entertainment) (2016 re-issue)
- Today (2021)
- Atmospheric (2022)
- For Broken Hearts (2024)

=== Singles ===
- "Heaven Must Have Sent You Back to Me" (Spaghetti / CIAO 1)
- "Love Is Everywhere" (1992) (Spaghetti / CIAO 3)
- "That Loving Feeling" (1992) (Spaghetti / CIAO 4)
- "Heaven Must Have Sent You Back to Me (Remix)" (1992) (Spaghetti / CIAO 5)
- "Live for Today" (Spaghetti / CIAO 7)
- "Don't Worry" (Clubscene)
- "Say Hello Wave Goodbye" (1996) (Clubscene)
- "She Has a Way" (1996) (Clubscene)
- "Summertime" (1997) (Clubscene)
- "Forever More" (Academy Street)
- "Wish" (featuring Amy Baillie) (Academy Street)
- "Face This World Alone" (2015) (Academy Street)
- "Wish" (with Amy Maeve Ballie) (2021)
- "In the Rain (Children of Today)" (with Holly Cicero) (2021)
- "This World I Never Knew" (2021)
- "Hold Onto The Memories" (2021)
- "When Love Fades Away" (2022)
- "We Were In Love" (2022)
- "Weekender" (2022)
