= Brian Bress =

American video artist

Brian Bress (born 1975 in Norfolk, Virginia) is an American video artist living and working in Los Angeles.

Bress received a BFA in film, animation and Video from the Rhode Island School of Design in Providence, Rhode Island in 1998, an MFA in Painting and Drawing from the University of California, Los Angeles in 2006. In 2007 Bress attended the Skowhegan School of Painting and Sculpture in Skowhegan, Maine.

In 2012 Bress's video piece "Status Report" was exhibited at the New Museum in New York City as part of their "Stowaway Series". Also in 2012 Bress showed five "video portraits" at the Santa Barbara Museum of Art in an exhibition entitled Interventions". In 2013 Bress' piece "Idiom (Brian, Raffi, Britt)" was exhibited in the Stark bar at the Los Angeles County Museum of Art. In that same year he also had self-titled solo exhibitions at the Museo d'arte contemporanea Roma in Rome, Italy and at the Galeria Marta Cevera in Madrid, Spain.

Bress's work was the subject of a touring ten year retrospective exhibition at Utah Museum of Fine Arts which opened in September 2015. The show then traveled to the Museum of Contemporary Art Denver in January 2016 and to the Orange County Museum of Art in August 2016.

Bress's work was included in the Biennial of Moving Images 2016 at Centre d’Art Contemporain Genève.

Bress is also known for his work with the Pet Shop Boys. In 2012 he directed the video for the duos song, "Invisible", from their "Elysium" release.

Bress's work is in the collections of the following institutions:

- Utah Museum of Fine Arts, Salt Lake City, UT
- Hammer Museum Los Angeles, CA
- Los Angeles County Museum of Art, CA
- Loyola University Museum of Art, Chicago, IL
- Museum of Contemporary Art, Chicago, IL
- Museum of Contemporary Art, San Diego, CA
- Norton Museum of Art, West Palm Beach, FL
- Palm Springs Art Museum, Palm Springs, CA
- Portland Museum of Art, Portland, OR
- San Diego Museum of Art, San Diego, CA
- Santa Barbara Museum of Art, CA
- Smart Museum of Art, University of Chicago, IL
- Whitney Museum of American Art, New York, NY
- Akron Art Museum, Akron, OH
