= Baskery =

Swedish band

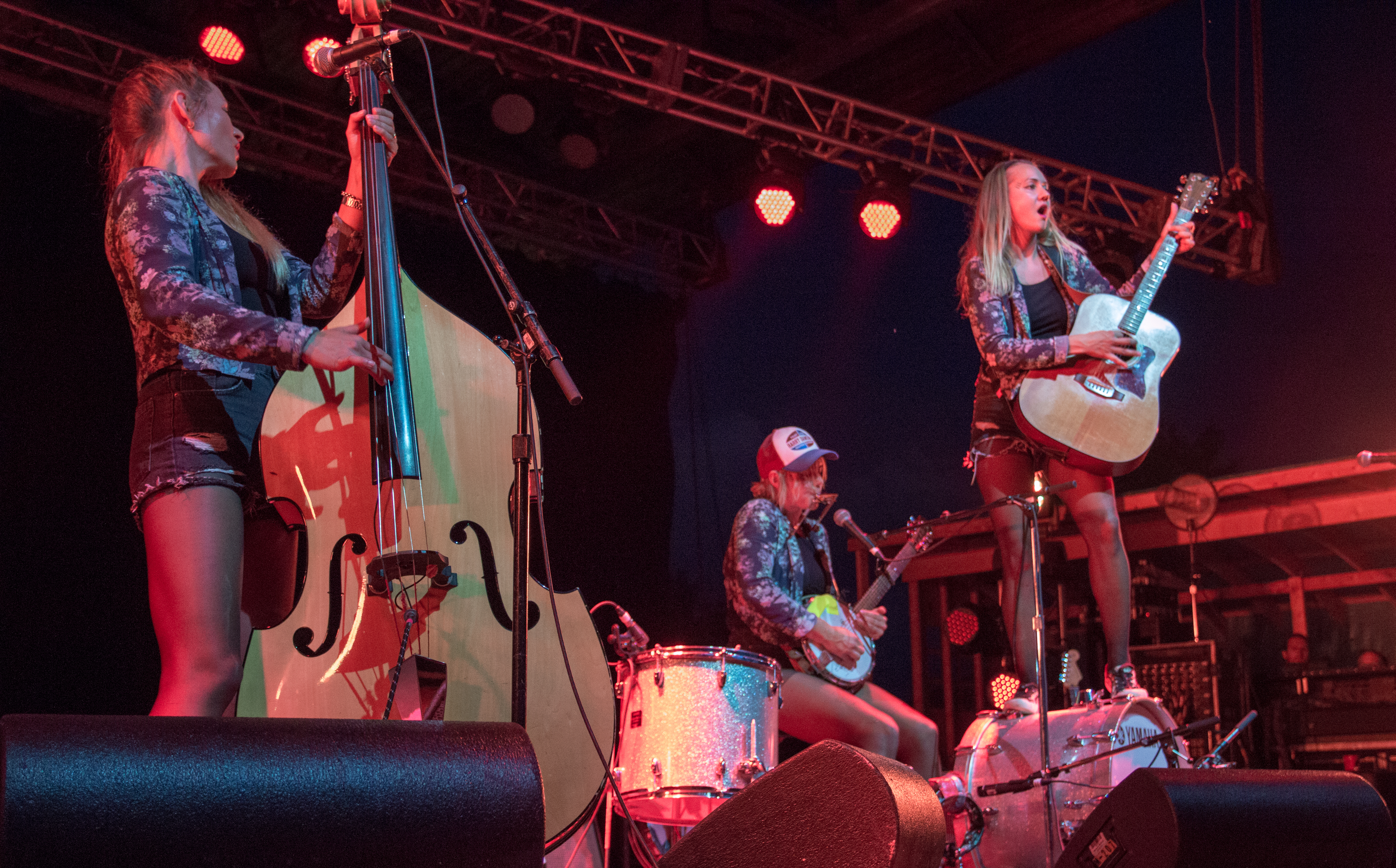
- Baskery performing at the 2015 Hillside Festival

Background information
- Origin: Stockholm, Sweden
- Genres: Alternative country, folk rock, banjo punk
- Years active: 2007–present
- Labels: Warner Bros. Veranda Ind. Records; Glitterhouse Records; Blue Rose Records; Mother Tarantula (present)
- Members: Greta Bondesson; Stella Bondesson; Sunniva Bondesson
- Website: http://www.baskeryband.com/

Baskery is a Swedish alternative Americana folk rock band, comprising the three sisters Greta, Stella and Sunniva Bondesson. The band have released six studio albums.

== History ==
Formed in 2007 as an offshoot of The Slaptones, who featured their father Janåke Bondesson on drums, released two albums (Simplify, 2003, and Amplify, 2004) and toured the United States with The Brian Setzer Orchestra.

Baskery released an EP, One Horse Down, in 2007 on Veranda Independent Records. Their first album, Fall Among Thieves, was recorded with producer Lasse Mårtén using no overdubs and mainly first or second takes, with the aim of capturing as much energy as possible. It was released in Sweden in May 2008; in Norway, Germany, Austria, Belgium, the Netherlands and Italy in autumn 2008; and in the UK in January 2009. In 2008 the group toured and played festivals in the United States, Canada, France, Ireland, Denmark and Norway, and toured the UK supporting Seth Lakeman in late 2008.

In 2011 Baskery released the album New Friends.

Throughout 2012 the band played gigs throughout the United States and Europe including festivals such as Beautiful Days and Shrewsbury Folk Festival before heading into the studio in Berlin to start work on recording their third album.

2013 saw the group touring Germany supporting Ina Müller before embarking on their own US tour playing across the country, including The Birchmere in Virginia with Johnny Winter, Four Corners Folk Festival in Colorado and Sisters Folk Festival in Oregon.

Little Wild Life, the third studio album, was released in Sweden in October 2013 before a Europe-wide release in early 2014.

In 2014 the sisters moved from Europe to the US and were based in Nashville, TN until they landed a record deal with Warner Bros. in September 2014, then relocated to Los Angeles, CA. Baskery opened up for Robbie Williams on his "Let Me Entertain You Tour" in early 2015 and supported Brandi Carlile later the same year.

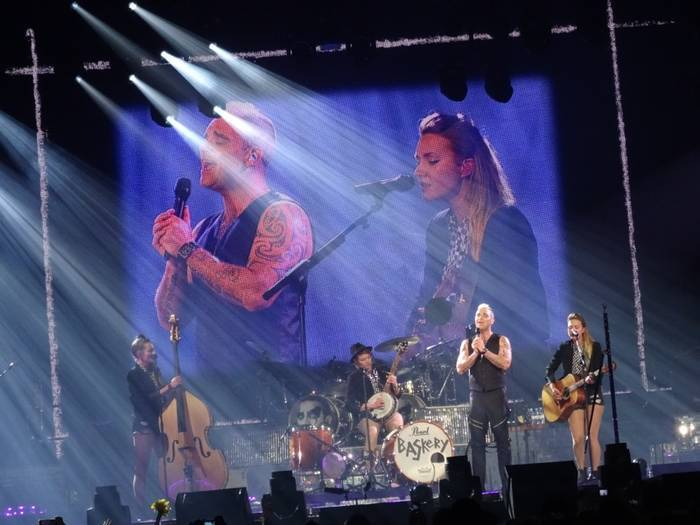

2016 / 2017 saw Baskery tour the length and breadth of the US including playing at Bottle Rock, Arroyo Seco, Newport Folk Festival, Bonnaroo, SXSW & Utopia Fest and supporting Gary Clark Jr. on his The Story of Sonny Boy Slim Tour.

Several singles were released in this period. Love in L.A. (2016) and then Cheerless Leaders, Cruel Companion and Sick Of The Remedy (2017).

In 2018 Baskery embarked on a busy touring schedule across the US, Sweden, Spain, Denmark, Finland and England, opening for Lukas Nelson & Promise of the Real on his German Tour.

The band's fourth studio album Coyote & Sirens was released in 2018 recorded at Glenwood Studios in Burbank, Los Angeles with Andrew Dawson (record producer).

In 2020 the band released the single The Fall.

2021 the band released the single Rock 'n' Roll on 7 inch single and as a digital download. For the vinyl release the single was backed with a cover of the Neil Young track "Old Man".

2022 saw Baskery touring extensively including playing Glastonbury Festival for its much welcome return after a two-year hiatus. A CD only release was issued by the band entitled Most Wanted Vol.1 - this was their own version of a bootleg, recreating the live experience as well as some key studio recordings. It was only available through the band's website.

Baskery's fifth studio album 'V: End of the Bloodline' was released in October 2023 to excellent reviews. Two digital only singles were released to accompany the LP - Wolf Hook and Way With Lovers.

2024 saw Baskery appearing at several festivals including a return to Glastonbury Festival.

In 2024 Baskery released an LP of Neil Young covers which was preceded by the singles Sugar Mountain and Cowgirl In The Sand. The album - The Young Sessions, Live To Tape - was announced on the Baskery website on October 4 2024 and was released December 13 2024. Subsequent singles Down By The River and Heart of Gold were released from the album.

== Style ==
The group have described their musical style in such terms as "killbilly", "mud-country" and "banjo punk" and they have been compared with The Dixie Chicks, The Roches, Led Zeppelin and Black Rebel Motorcycle Club. Colin Irwin of Mojo described them as "absurdly wonderful...[they] do their own thing with a glee which, coupled with no little virtuosity and runaway vivaciousness, is irresistible".

== Personal Lives ==
All members of Baskery are Vegan and are passionate about animal welfare and protecting the environment.

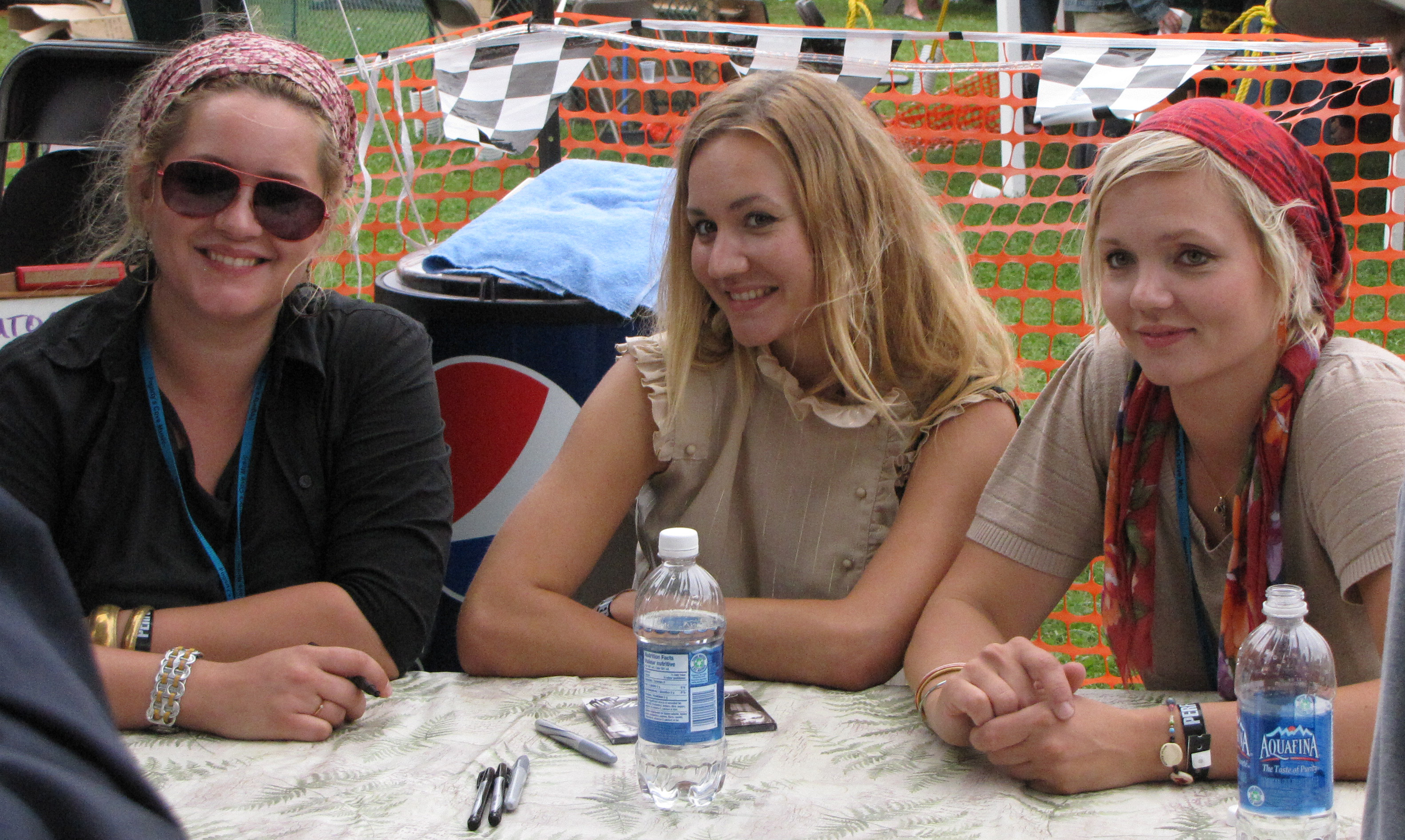
The band at an autograph session in 2010. From left: Stella, Sunniva & Greta

== Band members ==
- Greta Bondesson: Guitar banjo / guitars, drums, harmonica, vocals
- Stella Bondesson: Double bass, electric bass, vocals
- Sunniva Bondesson: Acoustic/electric guitars, cello, vocals

== Discography ==
=== EPs ===
- One Horse Down (Veranda Independent Records, 2007)
- Leafland Avenue (Mother Tarantula Records, 2020)

=== Singles ===
- Love In L.A. (Mother Tarantula Records, 2016)
- Cold Street (Warner Records Inc, 2020) - Track featured on Acoustic Christmas an Amazon Music Original release.
- Cruel Companion (Mother Tarantula Records, 2017)
- Cheerless Leaders (Mother Tarantula Records, 2017)
- Sick Of The Remedy (Mother Tarantula Records, 2017)
- Coup De Coeur Noir (Mother Tarantula Records, 2018)
- We are the People (Mother Tarantula Records, 2020)
- The Fall (Mother Tarantula Records, 2020)
- Old Man (Live In Haparanda) (Mother Tarantula Records, 2020)
- Rock n Roll (Mother Tarantula Records, 2021)
- Wolf Hook (Mother Tarantula Records, 2023)
- Way With Lovers (Mother Tarantula Records, 2023)
- Wolf Hook Live (Mother Tarantula Records, 2023) - Bandcamp release only
- Miss America Live (Mother Tarantula Records, 2023) - Bandcamp release only
- Sugar Mountain (Mother Tarantula Records, 2024)
- Cowgirl In The Sand (Mother Tarantula Records, 2024)
- Down To The River (Mother Tarantula Records, 2024)
- Heart Of Gold (Mother Tarantula Records, 2024)

=== Albums ===
- Fall Among Thieves (Glitterhouse Records, released Europe 2008, UK 2009)
- New Friends (Blue Rose Records, released 2011)
- Little Wild Life (Mother Tarantula Records, released 2013)
- Coyote & Sirens (Mother Tarantula Records, released 2018)
- V- End of the Bloodline (Mother Tarantula Records, released 2023)
- The Young Sessions - Live To Tape (Mother Tarantula Records, to be released November 2024)
