= ARORA (vocal group) =

American vocal band

Arora

Background information
- Origin: Los Angeles, California
- Genres: A cappella, electronic music, alternative rock, indie pop
- Years active: 2008–Present
- Label: Verve Forecast
- Members: Jessica Freedman; Rachel Bearer; Katharine Hoye; Christopher Given Harrison; Ben McLain
- Past members: Paul Peglar
- Website: www.aroratheband.com

Arora, stylized in allcaps with the first R backwards, and formerly called Sonos, is a vocal band based in Los Angeles. Sonos originally grew out of a 2006 recording project and began performing and touring in 2008. The group's repertoire centers on vocal covers sung a cappella with the use of effects pedals. Sonos competed in the third season of The Sing-Off on NBC and was eliminated on the fourth episode. The group changed their name to Arora in 2013 in preparation for the release of their third album, "Bioluminescence."

== History ==
Sonos began as a recording project in 2006, composed of then current and former members of the University of California, Los Angeles co-ed a cappella group Awaken A Cappella; the group arranged and recorded several songs. In 2007, the recording project disbanded and former members Christopher Harrison, Jessica Freedman and Paul Peglar recruited friends and colleagues Rachel Bearer, Katharine Hoye and Ben McLain to form Sonos.

In the fall of 2008, the sextet began performing live and incorporating electronic effects pedals. In the summer of 2009, Sonos completed SonoSings, 2009, produced by band member Harrison, as well as Gabriel Mann, and Hugo Vereker. Sara Bareilles was featured on the cover of her own song "Gravity" as a guest vocalist. Sonos signed onto Verve Forecast and released SonoSings September 15, 2009, and began touring.

Special appearances include live radio sessions on NPR's Weekend Edition, KCRW, BBC Americana, Studio 360 and Sirius XM Radio; performances at South by Southwest 2011, Sundance Film Festival 2010, Celtic Connections, ASCAP Awards and L.A. Ovation Awards; collaborations with Margaret Atwood and the Young@Heart Chorus at Royce Hall. In further collaborations, Sonos performed with Sara Bareilles at the Orpheum Theatre in Los Angeles and sang on an Ozomatli remix as part of their Ozomatli vs. KCRW Soundclash EP. Gods & Marionettes, their collaboration with the L.A. Contemporary Dance Company and playwright David Bridel, premiered in 2010 in Los Angeles at the Ford Amphitheater and USC's Bovard Auditorium.

In November 2010, Sonos released their second studio album, December Songs, also self-produced. December Songs comprises holiday season classics as well as four original songs: two by Bearer, and one each by Freedman and McLain.

In 2011, Sonos appeared on the Sing Off. They had 3 performances and were eliminated in the fourth week.

In 2012 Sonos appeared on Pet Shop Boys' album Elysium.

In July 2013, Sonos changed their name to "Arora" to reflect changes in image and style accompanying their third studio album release, "Bioluminescence." Arora says of their latest album, "Two years in the making, 'Bioluminescence' perfectly demonstrates the cinematic dream pop sound that is Arora, marrying dreamy vocals with striking production. Arora takes the album to the stage using nothing except their 5 voices and their rig of live looping and effects pedals."

In 2015, they worked with Mattel for the film Barbie in Rock 'n Royals. They recorded some songs for the movie.

== Members ==
- Jessica Freedman (soprano)
- Rachel Bearer (mezzo, writer/arranger)
- Katharine Hoye (alto, writer/arranger)
- Ben McLain (vocal percussion, tenor, writer/arranger)
- Christopher Given Harrison (bass, recording & mixing, producer, writer/arranger)

== Discography ==
Date	Title	Notes
2009	SonoSings	Debut album of covers
2010	December Songs	Holiday-themed covers and original material
2013	Bioluminescence	All-originals; debut album as "Arora"

== Awards ==
- Contemporary A Cappella Recording Awards (CARAs)
  - 2010
    - Best Pop/Rock Song: "I Want You Back" from Sonosings
  - 2011
    - Best Holiday Album: December Songs
    - Runner up: Best Religious Song: "Ave Maria" from December Songs
    - Runner up: Holiday Song: "Come December" from December Songs
    - Runner up: Best Professional Original Song: "Home" from December Songs
- A Cappella Community Awards (ACAs)
  - 2011
    - Favorite Pop/Rock Group
    - Favorite Female Vocalist: Jessica Freedman
    - Favorite Songwriter: Ben McLain
    - Favorite Arranger: Christopher Given Harrison
    - Favorite Mash-Up: "Wonderwall" (arr. Katharine Hoye)
    - Runner up: Favorite Professional Album: December Songs
    - Runner up: Favorite Vocal Percussionist: Ben McLain
    - Runner up: Favorite Live Performance Moment: Sonos set at SoJam A Cappella Festival 2010
  - 2010
    - Favorite Pop/Rock Group
    - Favorite Professional Album SonoSings
    - Favorite Female Vocalist: Jessica Freedman
    - Favorite A Cappella Song: "I Want You Back"
    - Favorite Gender-Bender Song/Solo: "I Want You Back"
    - Most Cutting-Edge Group
    - Runner up: Favorite Arranger: Christopher Given Harrison
    - Runner up: Favorite Arrangement: "I Want You Back" by Christopher Given Harrison
