= Wildlife Control (band) =

American indie rock band

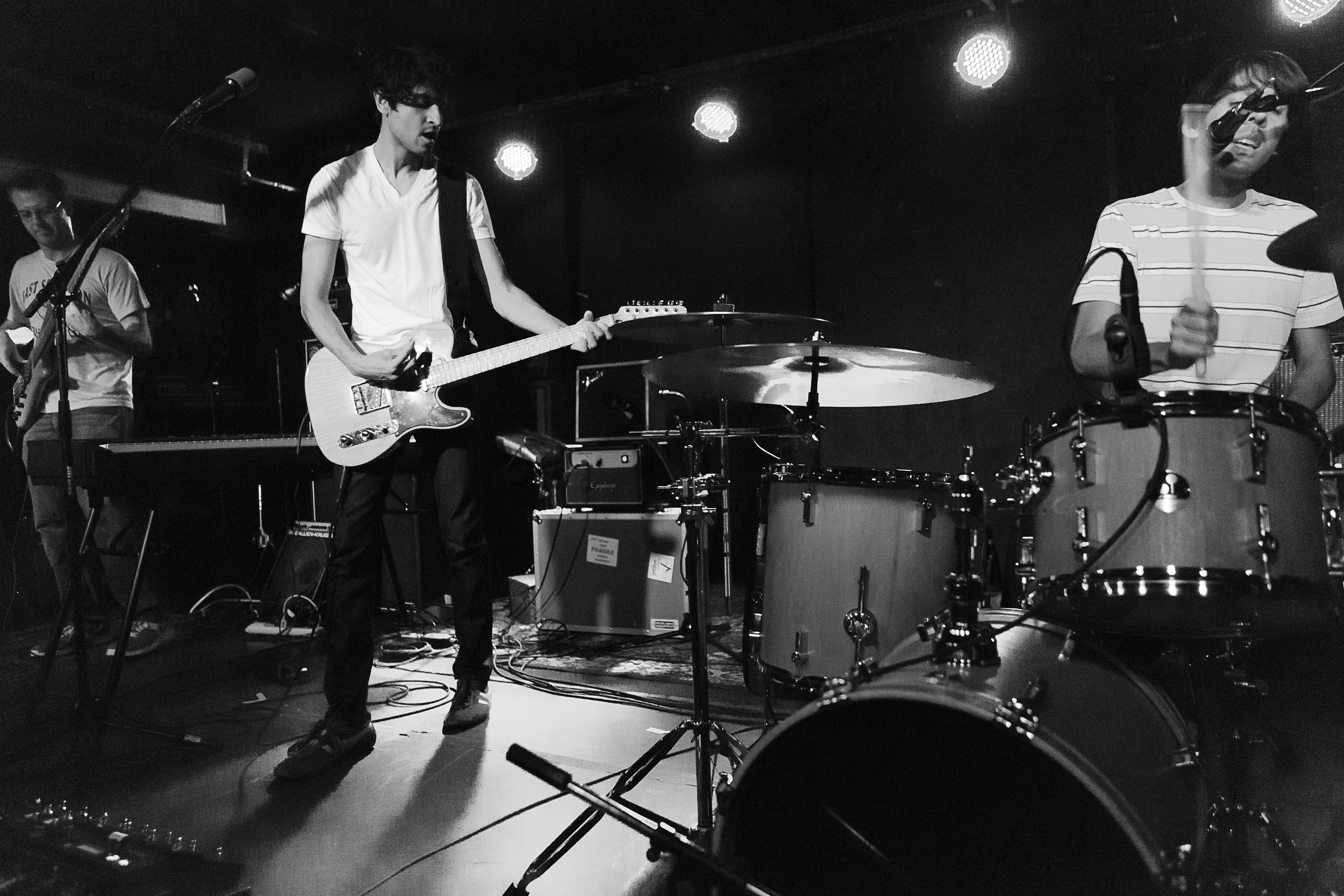
- Wildlife Control during a concert at Mercury Lounge in New York City in August 2012

Background information
- Origin: Brooklyn, New York, U.S. San Francisco, California, U.S.
- Genres: indie rock, alternative pop
- Years active: 2011 – present
- Label: Kobalt
- Members: Neil Shah; Sumul Shah
- Website: Official Site

Wildlife Control is an American indie rock band and creative lab originally from Brooklyn, New York and San Francisco, California formed in 2011 by brothers Neil Shah (lead vocals, guitar, piano) and Sumul Shah (vocals, drums, guitar). Touring members include Moppa Elliott (bass) and Kevin Thaxton (bass).

== History ==
Wildlife Control released their debut single Analog or Digital in December 2011 with an interactive video using HTML5, JavaScript, and the SoundCloud API. In February 2012, they released the official music video for Analog or Digital on YouTube. It went viral, officially trending during the first weekend of its release. Analog or Digital and the band's subsequently released EP, Spin were No. 1 on Amazon MP3's "Hot New Releases" sales chart in the alternative pop category.

Wildlife Control released their self-titled debut album on July 31, 2012. The album received favorable reviews from several major media outlets. Wired said it was "A great debut album from an indie band who really seem to be creating their own musical pulse." Two songs from the album hit the Hype Machine "Popular" chart, with People Change reaching No. 1 and Spin reaching No. 4. The band sold out album premiere shows at Mercury Lounge in New York City and Bottom of the Hill in San Francisco.

On August 22, 2012, Wildlife Control peaked at No. 48 on the CMJ Radio 200 chart, making it the highest ranked self-released album for that week.

Wildlife Control headlined The Deli Magazine's Avant Pop show at the 2012 CMJ Music Marathon.

South By Southwest announced on their website that Wildlife Control is scheduled to appear at the annual SXSW Music Festival in 2013.

On January 18, 2013, MTV Hive premiered a new Wildlife Control single titled Different, announcing a release date of January 29, 2013. The band then released another single titled Ages Places on March 8, 2013, while announcing details of their upcoming SXSW performances.

Billboard (magazine) announced on their website that Wildlife Control is scheduled to appear at the annual BottleRock Festival in 2015.

Popular Science premiered Particles on April 8, 2016, describing it as "one of the year's more forward thinking album releases." The album is composed of three movements: Illusion, Subtract, and Creature. Particles also features a 12-minute film by the same name with the music set to Hyperlapse videos from users around the world.

The Showtime documentary More Than T, featuring an original score by Wildlife Control, premiered on June 23, 2017. The film profiles seven members of the trans community and highlights their "passions, hopes for the future and life's work." Wildlife Control released the film's soundtrack on June 1, 2017, with The Burning Ear describing the music as "grand, sweeping, and full of hope."

In 2019, Ranker included Wildlife Control in their list of famous bands from the San Francisco Bay Area as voted on by the site's audience.

== Discography ==
=== Albums ===
Title	Release date	Peak chart positions	
Title	Release date	CMJ 200	Billboard Next Big Sound
Wildlife Control	31 July 2012	48	4
Music for a Film	1 June 2017	—	—
"—" denotes a recording that did not chart or was not released in that territory.

=== Extended plays ===
Title	Release date
Spin	27 March 2012
Particles	8 April 2016

=== Singles ===
Title	Release date	Peak chart positions
Title	Release date	SubModern
Analog or Digital	6 December 2011	12
Different	29 January 2013	—
Ages Places	8 March 2013	—
"—" denotes a recording that did not chart or was not released in that territory.

== Media ==
- Aux (TV channel) Track of the Week on July 6, 2012
- Billboard Next Big Sound Top 25 Chart on July 28, 2012
- SoundCloud Soundclouder of the Day on July 31, 2012
- Last.fm Most Hyped Artist - Alternative Rock on September 9, 2012
- Channel One News Hear it Now Artist of the Week on September 17, 2012
