= Kobalt Label Services =

Company providing record label services to artists

Kobalt Music Recordings
- Company type: Division
- Industry: Music
- Founded: 2012; 14 years ago
- Headquarters: London, United Kingdom
- Area served: Worldwide
- Services: Distribution; Campaign management; Marketing; Accounting; Data analytics; Direct to fan commerce; Digital archiving
- Parent: Kobalt Music Group

Kobalt Music Recordings is a division of Kobalt Music Group. KLS provides record label services to artists, receiving a share of revenues, while allowing artists to retain ownership of their master recordings. The company was founded in 2012 when Kobalt acquired digital distributor AWAL. Their roster includes artists such as Chip, Nick Cave & The Bad Seeds, Prince, New Kids on the Block, Pet Shop Boys, Maya Jane Coles, and Travis.

== Artists ==
- Band of Horses
- Band of Skulls
- Best Coast
- The Birds of Satan
- Blonde Redhead
- Boy George
- Chip
- Maya Jane Coles
- Culture Club
- The Darkness
- De La Soul
- Die Antwoord
- Dispatch
- Markus Feehily
- Neil Finn
- Sean Forbes
- Frank Carter & The Rattlesnakes
- David Gray
- The Growlers
- Eric Hutchinson
- Billy Idol
- Karen O
- Kele
- Lenny Kravitz
- Lifehouse
- Little Boots
- Courtney Love
- Jowynalex
- Laura Marling
- Richard Marx
- Massive Attack
- Martina McBride
- Brian McKnight
- Mint Condition
- New Kids on the Block
- Nick Cave and the Bad Seeds
- Noel Gallagher's High Flying Birds
- Pet Shop Boys (until 2023)
- Peter Bjorn and John
- Placebo
- Prince
- Duncan Sheik
- Steel Panther
- Dave Stewart
- Joss Stone
- Travis
- VÉRITÉ
- The Voidz
- Von Grey
- The Waterboys
- Wildlife Control
- Dan Wilson
- Ozuna

== Labels ==
- Atom Ninja Records
- Cash Motto
- Cherry Forever Records
- Chrysalis Records
- Cult Records
- Different Man Music
- Ramalamadingdong Recordings Ltd.
- Marathon Artists
- Mau5trap
- EEM Records
- Red Telephone Box
- HipHop Rex
- Sour Mash Records
- Painfullyanallymusicentertainment Inc. (USA Only)
- Very Me Records
- Zoiks Music
- Woah Dad!
- x2 (until 2023)
