= Vanessa Freebairn-Smith =

American musician

Vanessa Freebairn-Smith is a cellist, based in Los Angeles, California. She is a founding member of the Sonus Quartet, formed in 2003, which presents art music in alternative and unusual ways, fusing classical with pop, rock, and hip-hop. She is the daughter of Ian Freebairn-Smith.

Freebairn-Smith has performed with the Sonus Quartet at presentations such as The Grammy's, The AMA's, The Tonight Show with Jay Leno and the Late Show with David Letterman. In recent years, she has worked in conjunction with artists such as Sarah McLachlan, Paul McCartney, Ringo Starr, Billy Preston, Dhani Harrison, Sting, Jay-Z, Jewel, John Frusciante, Josh Klinghoffer, Billy Joel, and k.d. lang.

When she is not working with the Sonus Quartet, Freebairn-Smith plays a wide variety of musical genres from classical to rock and does both studio work for albums as well as film and television scores, also performing live in many venues and television presentations. She recently toured with Gnarls Barkley as well as Josh Groban on his 'Awake' tour. She toured with Jeff Beck on his 'Stars Align' Tour.
