= Christina Paakkari =

American audio engineer

Christina Paakkari, also known as Charlie Paakkari, is an American audio engineer for Capitol Records and the recipient of a 2005 Grammy Award for her work on the Dianne Reeves album Good Night, and Good Luck.
