= James Thatcher (musician) =

American musician

James Thatcher is an American hornist.

== Early career ==
Thatcher began his professional career at age 16 when he played and studied in Mexico City with his uncle, Gerald Thatcher, former principal hornist with the National Symphony of Mexico. Subsequent instructors have included Fred Fox, Don Peterson, Thomas Greer, Wendell Hoss, James Decker, Vincent DeRosa and master classes with Hermann Baumann. He also earned a bachelor's degree at Brigham Young University. Thatcher has been a member of the Phoenix Symphony, the Utah Symphony, the Pacific Symphony and the Los Angeles Philharmonic.

== Career ==
As of 2016, Thatcher is principal horn of the Pasadena Symphony, the New West Symphony and the Los Angeles Music Center Opera, but principally he is a studio player, a recipient of the Most Valuable Player Award from the National Association of Recording Arts and Sciences and "arguably the most often heard horn player in the world" due to his performances on some 70 to 80 films per year for the last 20 years.

Thatcher was a faculty member the USC Thornton School of Music as the co-professor of Horn.

== Selected filmography ==
Thatcher has the enviable position of being the favored first horn of multiple-Oscar-winning composer John Williams performing in such films as Always, Jurassic Park, The Lost World, Sleepers (in which he received an on-screen credit), Nixon, Schindler's List, JFK, Sabrina, Home Alone, Rosewood, Seven Years in Tibet and The Patriot as well as the fanfare for the 1992 Olympics. He also has worked regularly with other Hollywood greats Jerry Goldsmith, James Newton Howard, Randy Newman, John Barry, James Horner and Alan Silvestri, as well as many others. He can also be heard in the tracks to Glory, The Rocketeer, Field of Dreams, Monster House, X-Men: The Last Stand, Robots, Spider-Man 3, Ice Age, Polar Express, Beowulf, Dances with Wolves, Toy Story, Cars, Maverick, Apollo 13, Forrest Gump, Titanic, Pearl Harbor, Constantine, National Treasure, Transformers, The Simpsons Movie, Night at the Museum, Dinosaur, Atlantis: The Lost Empire, King Kong, Signs, Lady in the Water, Peter Pan, First Knight, Hook as well as Independence Day, and the Star Trek films. In 2010, Thatcher was principal horn on James Newton Howard's soundtrack of The Last Airbender directed by M. Night Shyamalan.
