= Andrew Dawson (music producer) =

American music producer (born 1980)

- Born: March 12, 1980 (age 46)
- Origin: Minneapolis, Minnesota, U.S.
- Genres: Hip hop; pop; rock; R&B
- Occupations: Record producer; songwriter; mixer; engineer; songwriter
- Instruments: Piano; guitar
- Website: http://soundeq.com/

Andrew Dawson (born March 12, 1980) is an American music producer, engineer, mixer and songwriter based in Maryvale, Arizona. Dawson is a three-time Grammy award winner and six-time Grammy nominee, having won for his work as engineer and mixer on Kanye West's Late Registration (2005), Graduation (2007, 11 September), and My Beautiful Dark Twisted Fantasy (2010) – each winning the Best Rap Album category. Dawson is also credited with additional production on My Beautiful Dark Twisted Fantasy. Although Dawson made his initial breakthrough with hip hop artists including Kanye West, Jay-Z, Common, Tyler The Creator, and P.O.S, Dawson has also moved on to produce and work on records for pop, indie and rock bands including fun., The Rolling Stones, Pet Shop Boys, Sleigh Bells, Baskery and Night Terrors of 1927.

== Life and career ==
=== Personal life ===
Dawson began playing piano at the age of five, studying jazz and classical piano at a private music conservatory until the age of 16. During the last few years of high school, Dawson interned at a Minneapolis recording studio and during the summers did live sound mixing for outdoor concerts. Dawson then attended Berklee College of Music in Boston, Massachusetts, where he majored in Music Production & Engineering. While living in the Boston area Dawson worked at Lexicon - a company famous for manufacturing digital reverb units including the 480L. In 2001 Dawson moved to New York City, where he worked as an assistant then later became a staff engineer at Sony Music Studios. Dawson prefers to work on projects that have meaning, due to his passion for music, and work with artists who are equally as passionate about their records.

=== Work with Kanye West ===
In 2003, midway through the recording and producer sessions for Kanye West's The College Dropout, Dawson was called to try for the position of Kanye West's engineer. The rap artist and producer Kanye West had gone through a string of seven engineers, all of whom were fired. Dawson was able to impress the rap star and maintained his position. Since then Dawson has worked as West's primary audio and mixing engineer. In a period spanning almost 9 years, Dawson has been directly involved in seven of West's studio album releases, totaling in sales of over 11 million records and four #1 US albums.

== Studio ==
The majority of fun.'s chart topping album Some Nights, including #1 single "We Are Young" was recorded at SoundEQ Studios. Dawson has hosted co-writing sessions with artists and writers including Andy Grammer, Hudson Taylor, Baby E, Zack Waters, K.Flay, Michelle Branch, Kimbra, and Jimmy Harry.

== Discography ==
Artist	Year	Album	Producer	Engineer	Mixer	Co-writer
Code Orange	2020	Underneath			check	
Teyana Taylor	2018	K.T.S.E.	check		check	
Baskery	2018	Coyote & Sirens	check	check	check	
Mike Shinoda	2018	Post Traumatic	check			check
Pusha T	2018	Daytona	check	check		check
Linkin Park	2017	One More Light	check			
Childish Gambino	2013	Because the Internet			check	
Night Terrors of 1927	2013	Guilty Pleas	check	check	check	check
Tyler, The Creator	2013	Wolf			check	
Kanye West	2013	Yeezus		check		
Phlo Finister	2013	Poster Girl EP	check			check
Sleigh Bells	2013	Bitter Rivals			check	
The Rolling Stones	2012	GRRR!		check		
Kanye West	2012	Cruel Summer			check	
Pet Shop Boys	2012	Elysium	check	check	check	
VersaEmerge	2012	Another Atmosphere	check	check	check	check
POP ETC	2012	POP ETC	check	check	check	
P.O.S.	2012	We Don't Even Live Here	check	check	check	check
fun.	2012	Some Nights		check		
Beyoncé	2011	4		check		
Kanye West, Jay-Z	2011	Watch the Throne		check		
Big Sean	2011	Finally Famous		check		
Snoop Dogg	2011	Doggumentary		check		
Chamillionaire	2011	"When Ya On" single	check	check		check
T.I.	2010	No Mercy		check		
Kanye West	2010	My Beautiful Dark Twisted Fantasy *	co-P	check	check	
Rick Ross	2010	Teflon Don		check		
Various Artists	2010	Just Dance Vol. 3			check	
Common	2010	Go! - Common Classics		check		
Mr. Hudson	2010	Straight No Chaser		check	check	
Thirty Seconds to Mars	2009	This Is War		check		
Mary J. Blige	2009	Stronger with Each Tear		check		
Kid Cudi	2009	Man on the Moon: The End of Day		check		
Jay-Z	2009	The Blueprint 3		check		
N.A.S.A.	2009	The Spirit of Apollo		check		
Kanye West	2008	808s & Heartbreak		check	check	
T-Pain	2008	Thr33 Ringz		check		
T.I.	2008	Paper Trail			check	
Kanye West feat. Chris Martin	2008	"Homecoming" single		check	check	
Lil Wayne	2008	The Carter III			check	
Kanye West	2007	Graduation *		check	check	
Chrisette Michele	2007	I Am		check		
Ne-Yo	2007	Because of You		check		
Consequence	2007	Don't Quit Your Day Job!		check	check	
John Legend	2007	Once Again		check		
UGK	2006	Underground Kingz		check		
Common	2006	Finding Forever		check	check	
Jay-Z	2006	Kingdom Come		check		
Nas	2006	Hip Hop Is Dead		check		
The Game	2006	Doctor's Advocate		check		
Monica	2006	The Makings of Me			check	
The Notorious B.I.G.	2005	Duets: The Final Chapter		check		
Paul Wall	2005	The People's Champ		check		
Kanye West	2005	Late Registration *		check	check	
Common	2005	Be		check		
John Legend	2004	Get Lifted		check		
Destiny's Child	2004	Destiny Fulfilled			check	
Maria Mena	2004	White Turns Blue			check	
Kanye West	2004	The College Dropout		check		

- Indicates Grammy win.
