= X2 (record label) =

British record label

x2 (pronounced "times two") is a British record label set up in 2013 by Pet Shop Boys for the release of their own music.

== x2 history ==
On 14 March 2013, the Pet Shop Boys officially left Parlophone after 28 years and entered into a new arrangement with Kobalt Label Services for the release of their 12th album, their first release on their own music label. Tennant said at the time, "We'd like to thank everyone we've worked with at Parlophone over the last 28 years both in the UK and abroad. When we signed to the label in 1985 we had no idea how long and successful a relationship we were embarking on. However it is also exciting now to commence a new phase working with a new team in a new business structure and we look forward to a creative and equally fulfilling relationship with Kobalt." On 31 January 2024, the Pet Shop Boys were "delighted to confirm their return to Parlophone". Music will continue to be released through x2 with Parlophone handling distribution.

== Previous record labels ==
In addition to their time signed to Parlophone, Pet Shop Boys had previously created several smaller record labels for the release of side projects and collaborations.

Spaghetti Records was launched in September 1991. The label's first single to be released was by a 21-year-old Scottish singer, synthesizer player and songwriter David Cicero. The single was called "Heaven Must Have Sent You Back to Me". Cicero released four more singles and an album on Spaghetti. Other artists to release material on Spaghetti include Masterboy, Boy George and Ignorants. The label's logo is the word SPAGHETTI laid out vertically in extremely tall extra-thin type, to mimic a strand of spaghetti.

Olde English Vinyl and Lucky Kunst were launched by the Pet Shop Boys in May 2003. These labels had releases by Atomizer, Pete Burns and Sam Taylor-Wood.

== See also ==
- Vanity label
- Lists of record labels
