= Deep (East 17 song) =

1993 single by East 17

Single by East 17

from the album Walthamstow
- Released: 18 January 1993
- Genre: Pop; funk; hip-hop
- Length: 4:08
- Label: London
- Songwriter: Tony Mortimer
- Producers: Robin Goodfellow, Ian Curnow, Phil Harding

East 17 singles chronology
"Gold" (1992)	"Deep" (1993)	"Slow It Down" (1993)

Music video
- "Deep" on YouTube

"Deep" is a song by British boy band East 17, released on 18 January 1993 by London Records as the third single from the band's debut album Walthamstow (1993). Written by band member Tony Mortimer and produced by Robin Goodfellow along with Ian Curnow and Phil Harding, "Deep" charted at number five on the UK Singles Chart and entered the top 10 in Australia, Ireland, Sweden and Zimbabwe. It is the band's only single to appear on the main Billboard charts in the United States, peaking at number 23 on the Bubbling Under Hot 100 in September 1993. The accompanying music video was directed by Richard Heslop.

== Critical reception ==
Larry Flick from Billboard magazine wrote, "Shuffling, hip-hop-lite beats groove along at a pleasing clip, while harmless rapping and layers of harmony cover the bases of top 40's fave sounds of the moment. It may sound completely formulaic and sugary, but it works incredibly well. Besides, not every song is meant to change the world. Sometimes, a little ear-candy is in order." Adam Sweeting from The Guardian declared it as a "happening dance-pop combo [that] are currently luxuriating in chart glory with the atmospheric 'Deep', though the song is hardly typical." Victoria Segal from Melody Maker wrote, "A phallic monument that could make the Eiffel Tower blush, it swam with hilariously creepy lust-lyrics — I'll butter the toast if you lick the knife, indeed — and a slippery Hot Chocolate bass-line, encapsulating why the choice had to be made." A reviewer from Music & Media felt the "slow rap not unlike L.L. Cool J's standard 'I Need Love' is a fairly inventive piece of music."

Alan Jones from Music Week named it Pick of the Week, commenting, "After their high octane hit 'House of Love', it's something of a surprise to hear East 17 adopt a shuffle beat, as they do here, for a much less frenetic deadpan rap, punctuated by a melodic chorus, some pretty piano runs and chiming strings. A hit of some magnitude." Jeff Silberman from The Network Forty described it as "a smooth pop/funk ditty with spoken-rap vocals and sweet harmonies. This song is funky enough for crossover, yet polished and melodic enough for the mainstream. An inviting debut from their first album, Walthamstow." Another TNF editor, Wendi Cermak, noted that "down-tempo and smooth, this jam comes off fresh. With a sound something like PM Dawn, this tune is sure to please." Gina Morris from NME wrote, "'Deep' is a gooey, girlie, dripping wet lettuce of a song, set to rival Take That's last abysmal effort." Neil Spencer from The Observer remarked that "with sly sexuality", the band showed "surprisingly clever songwriting." Johnny Lee from Smash Hits gave it five out of five and named it Best New Single, writing that "the tykes from the 'Stow launch into the '93 with a groove so slinky it's almost obscene. Tony purrs his rap - "how much I can touch/How much and where" - in slo-mo mystical fashion. Plus it's got the most squishy chorus ever."

== Music video ==
The official music video for "Deep", directed by British director Richard Heslop, intercuts clips of the band performing the track in various locations, hanging out, and playing pool in their local area.

== Track listings ==
- UK and Australian CD single
1. "Deep" (Breath mix)
2. "Deep" (Penetration mix)
3. "Deep" (Throat mix)
4. "Deep" (Down)
- UK limited-edition CD single
1. "Deep" (Depth mix)
2. "House of Love" (Wet Nose dub)
3. "Gold" (Paws on the Floor)
4. "Deep" (Meaning)
- UK 7-inch and cassette single; European CD single
1. "Deep" (Breath mix)
2. "Deep" (Depth mix)
- French CD single
1. "Deep" (remix) – 3:10
2. "Deep" (Penetration mix) – 4:52
- US 12-inch single

A1. "Deep" (Penetration mix) – 4:52
A2. "Deep" (Meaning) – 4:06
B1. "Deep" (Down) – 4:39
B2. "Deep" (Throat mix) – 6:16

- US cassette single

A1. "Deep" (Breath mix) – 3:59
A2. Special previews ("House of Love"/"Slow It Down"/"West End Girls")
B1. "I Disagree" – 4:57
B2. Special previews ("House of Love"/"Slow It Down"/"West End Girls")

== Charts ==
=== Weekly charts ===
Chart (1993–1994)	Peak position
Australia (ARIA)	7
Austria (Ö3 Austria Top 40)	13
Belgium (Ultratop 50 Flanders)	40
Europe (Eurochart Hot 100)	16
Europe (European Dance Radio)	19
Europe (European Hit Radio)	26
Finland (Suomen virallinen lista)	13
France (SNEP)	30
France Airplay (SNEP)	22
Germany (GfK)	14
Greece (IFPI Greece)	3
Ireland (IRMA)	7
Israel (Israeli Singles Chart)	1
Japan International (Oricon)	5
Netherlands (Dutch Top 40)	22
Netherlands (Single Top 100)	31
New Zealand (Recorded Music NZ)	50
Sweden (Sverigetopplistan)	6
Switzerland (Schweizer Hitparade)	32
UK Singles (Official Charts)	5
UK Airplay (Music Week)	13
US Bubbling Under Hot 100 (Billboard)	23
Zimbabwe (ZIMA)	8

=== Year-end charts ===
Chart (1993)	Position
Australia (ARIA)	46
Europe (Eurochart Hot 100)	62
Germany (Media Control)	66
Israel (Israeli Singles Chart)	31
Sweden (Topplistan)	69
UK Singles (OCC)	39

== Certifications ==
Region	Certification	Certified units/sales
Australia (ARIA)	Gold	35,000^{^}
United Kingdom (BPI)	Silver	200,000^{^}
^{^} Shipments figures based on certification alone.

== Release history ==
Region	Date	Format(s)	Label(s)	Ref.
United Kingdom	18 January 1993	7-inch vinyl; CD; cassette	London	
Japan	26 May 1993	Mini-CD	London	
