= Walthamstow (album) =

Studio album by East 17
- Released: 1992
- Recorded: 1991–1992
- Length: 61:07 (first release); 65:34 (first reissue); 66:12 (second reissue)
- Label: London
- Producers: Robin Goodfellow; Ian Curnow; Phil Harding; Steve Spiro; Mykaell Riley; Howie Bernstein; Neil Stainton

East 17 chronology
Walthamstow (1992)	Steam (1994)

Singles from Walthamstow
- 1. "House of Love" Released: 17 August 1992; 2. "Gold" Released: 2 November 1992; 3. "Deep" Released: 18 January 1993; 4. "Slow It Down" Released: 29 March 1993; 5. "West End Girls" Released: 14 June 1993; 6. "It's Alright" Released: 22 November 1993

Alternative cover
- US cover of the album

Professional ratings
Review scores
Source	Rating
AllMusic	3.5/5 stars
Music Week	4/5 stars
The Observer	(favourable)
Select (Jan 1993)	1/5 medals
Select (Mar 1993)	3/5 medals

Walthamstow is the debut album by English boy band East 17. The album entered the UK Albums Chart at number 1 on 27 February 1993 and contains three UK top-10 singles: their debut single "House of Love", released in 1992 (No. 10), third single "Deep" (No. 5), and sixth single "It's Alright" (No. 3).

British boyband contemporaries Take That's debut album Take That & Party had peaked at number two the previous month in the UK, 20 weeks after release. With both albums achieving huge commercial success at the same time this period (early 1993) signalled the start of boyband mania in the UK.

The album was certified Platinum in the UK.

== Track listing ==
All tracks are written by Anthony Mortimer, except where noted.

Standard version
No.	Title	Producer(s)	Length
1.	"House of Love"	Robin Goodfellow, Ian Curnow^{[a]}, Phil Harding^{[a]}	4:42
2.	"Deep"	Robin Goodfellow, Ian Curnow, Phil Harding	4:08
3.	"Gold"	Curnow, Harding	4:21
4.	"Love Is More Than a Feeling"	Steve Spiro	4:02
5.	"I Disagree"	Mykaell Riley	5:00
6.	"Gotta Do Something"	Curnow, Harding	4:21
7.	"Slow It Down"	Riley	4:44
8.	"I Want It"	Howie Bernstein, Neil Stainton	5:39
9.	"It's Alright"	Stainton	4:02
10.	"Feel What U Can't C"	Stainton	3:26
11.	"Gold" (Paws on the Floor)	Curnow, Harding, Phil Kelsey^{[b]}	7:04
12.	"Deep" (Dark mix)	Curnow, Harding, Goodfellow	4:43
13.	"Slow It Down" (Liverpool mix)	Riley	4:55
Total length:			61:07

1993 first re-release
No.	Title	Producer(s)	Length
1.	"House of Love"	Robin Goodfellow, Ian Curnow^{[a]}, Phil Harding^{[a]}	4:29
2.	"Deep"	Curnow, Harding, Goodfellow	4:08
3.	"Gold"	Curnow, Harding	4:21
4.	"Love Is More Than a Feeling"	Steve Spiro	4:02
5.	"I Disagree"	Mykaell Riley	5:00
6.	"Gotta Do Something"	Curnow, Harding	4:21
7.	"Slow It Down"	Riley	4:44
8.	"I Want It"	Howie Bernstein, Neil Stainton	5:39
9.	"It's Alright"	Stainton	4:02
10.	"Feel What U Can't C"	Stainton	3:26
11.	"West End Girls" (Faces on Posters mix; Neil Tennant, Chris Lowe)	The Groove Corporation	4:27
12.	"Gold" (Paws on the Floor)	Curnow, Harding, Phil Kelsey^{[b]}	7:04
13.	"Deep" (Dark mix)	Curnow, Harding, Goodfellow	4:43
14.	"Slow It Down" (Liverpool mix)	Riley	4:55
Total length:			65:34

1993 second re-release
No.	Title	Producer(s)	Length
1.	"House of Love"	Robin Goodfellow, Ian Curnow^{[a]}, Phil Harding^{[a]}	4:29
2.	"Deep"	Curnow, Harding, Goodfellow	4:08
3.	"Gold"	Curnow, Harding	4:21
4.	"Love Is More Than a Feeling"	Steve Spiro	4:02
5.	"I Disagree"	Mykaell Riley	5:00
6.	"Gotta Do Something"	Curnow, Harding	4:21
7.	"Slow It Down"	Riley	4:44
8.	"I Want It"	Howie Bernstein, Neil Stainton	5:39
9.	"It's Alright" (The Guvnor mix)	Power Syndicate	4:40
10.	"Feel What U Can't C"	Stainton	3:26
11.	"West End Girls" (Faces on Posters mix; Neil Tennant, Chris Lowe)	The Groove Corporation	4:27
12.	"Gold" (Paws on the Floor)	Curnow, Harding, Phil Kelsey^{[b]}	7:04
13.	"Deep" (Dark mix)	Curnow, Harding, Goodfellow	4:43
14.	"Slow It Down" (Liverpool mix)	Riley	4:55
Total length:			66:12

Notes

- ^{^[a]} signifies an additional producer
- ^{^[b]} signifies a remixer

== Charts ==
=== Weekly charts ===
Weekly chart performance for Walthamstow
Chart (1993-1994)	Peak position
Australian Albums (ARIA)	5
Austrian Albums (Ö3 Austria)	10
Dutch Albums (Album Top 100)	17
European Albums Chart	11
Finnish Albums (Suomen virallinen lista)	2
French Albums (SNEP)	5
German Albums (Offizielle Top 100)	11
Greek Albums (IFPI Greece)	4
Hungarian Albums (MAHASZ)	10
Irish Albums (IRMA)	22
Scottish Albums (OCC) (March 1994 chart inception)	51
Swedish Albums (Sverigetopplistan)	9
Swiss Albums (Schweizer Hitparade)	22
UK Albums (OCC)	1

=== Year-end charts ===
Year-end chart performance for Walthamstow
Chart (1993)	Position
Australian Albums (ARIA)	83
Europe (Eurochart Hot 100)	64
German Albums (Offizielle Deutsche Charts)	75
UK Albums (OCC)	37
Chart (1994)	Position
Australian Albums (ARIA)	37
Europe (Eurochart Hot 100)	72
French Albums (SNEP)	21
German Albums (Offizielle Deutsche Charts)	51

== Certifications ==
Certifications for Walthamstow
Region	Certification	Certified units/sales
Australia (ARIA)	Platinum	70,000^{^}
France (SNEP)	Platinum	300,000^{*}
Germany (BVMI)	Gold	250,000^{^}
Switzerland (IFPI Switzerland)	Gold	25,000^{^}
United Kingdom (BPI)	Platinum	300,000^{^}
^{*} Sales figures based on certification alone.^{^} Shipments figures based on certification alone.
