= The Caretaker (play) =

1960 play by Harold Pinter

- First edition cover of The Caretaker, 1960
- Original language: English
- Written by: Harold Pinter
- Characters: Mick, a man in his late twenties; Aston, a man in his early thirties; Davies, an old man
- Setting: A house in West London. Winter.

Premiere
- Date: 27 April 1960
- Place: Arts Theatre; Westminster, London

The Caretaker is a drama in three acts by Harold Pinter. Although it was the sixth of his major works for stage and television, this psychological study of the confluence of power, allegiance, innocence, and corruption among two brothers and a tramp, became Pinter's first significant commercial success. It premiered at the Arts Theatre Club in London's West End on 27 April 1960 and transferred to the Duchess Theatre the following month, where it ran for 444 performances before departing London for Broadway. In 1963, a film version of the play based on Pinter's unpublished screenplay was directed by Clive Donner. The movie starred Alan Bates as Mick and Donald Pleasence as Davies in their original stage roles, while Robert Shaw replaced Peter Woodthorpe as Aston. First published by both Encore Publishing and Eyre Methuen in 1960, The Caretaker remains one of Pinter's most celebrated and oft-performed plays.

== Plot summary ==
=== Act I ===
A night in winter

[Scene 1]

Aston has invited Davies, a homeless man, into his flat after rescuing him from a bar fight (7–9). Davies comments on the flat and criticises the fact that it is cluttered and badly kept. Aston attempts to find a pair of shoes for Davies but Davies rejects all the offers. He turns down a pair that doesn't fit well enough and another that has the wrong colour laces. Early on, Davies reveals to Aston that his real name is not "Bernard Jenkins", his "assumed name", but really "Mac Davies" (19–20, 25). He claims that his papers validating this fact are in Sidcup and that he must and will return there to retrieve them just as soon as he has a good pair of shoes. Aston and Davies discuss where he will sleep and the problem of the "bucket" attached to the ceiling to catch dripping rain water from the leaky roof (20–21) and Davies "gets into bed" while "ASTON sits, poking his [electrical] plug (21).

[Scene 2]
The LIGHTS FADE OUT. Darkness.

LIGHTS UP. Morning. (21) As Aston dresses for the day, Davies awakes with a start, and Aston informs Davies that he was kept up all night by Davies muttering in his sleep. Davies denies that he made any noise and blames the racket on the neighbours, revealing his fear of foreigners: "I tell you what, maybe it were them Blacks" (23). Aston informs Davies that he is going out, but invites him to stay if he likes, indicating that he trusts him (23–24), something unexpected by Davies; for, as soon as Aston does leave the room (27), Davies begins rummaging through Aston's "stuff" (27–28) but he is interrupted when Mick, Aston's brother, unexpectedly arrives, "moves upstage, silently", "slides across the room" and then suddenly "seizes Davies' "arm and forces it up his back", in response to which "DAVIES screams", and they engage in a minutely choreographed struggle, which Mick wins (28–29), ending Act One with the "Curtain" line, "What's the game?" (29).

=== Act II ===
[Scene 1]
A few seconds later

Mick demands to know Davies' name, which the latter gives as "Jenkins" (30), interrogates him about how well he slept the night before (30), wonders whether or not Davies is actually "a foreigner"—to which Davies retorts that he "was" indeed (in Mick's phrase) "Born and bred in the British Isles" (33)—going on to accuse Davies of being "an old robber […] an old skate" who is "stinking the place out" (35), and spinning a verbal web full of banking jargon designed to confuse Davies, while stating, hyperbolically, that his brother Aston is "a number one decorator" (36), either an outright lie or self-deceptive wishful thinking on his part. Just as Mick reaches the climactic line of his diatribe geared to put the old tramp off balance—"Who do you bank with?" (36), Aston enters with a "bag" ostensibly for Davies, and the brothers debate how to fix the leaking roof and Davies interrupts to inject the more practical question: "What do you do . . . when that bucket's full?" (37) and Aston simply says, "Empty it" (37). The three battle over the "bag" that Aston has brought Davies, one of the most comic and often-cited Beckettian routines in the play (38–39). After Mick leaves, and Davies recognises him to be "a real joker, that lad" (40), they discuss Mick's work in "the building trade" and Davies ultimately discloses that the bag they have fought over and that he was so determined to hold on to "ain't my bag" at all (41). Aston offers Davies the job of Caretaker, (42–43), leading to Davies' various assorted animadversions about the dangers that he faces for "going under an assumed name" and possibly being found out by anyone who might "ring the bell called Caretaker" (44).

[Scene 2]

THE LIGHTS FADE TO BLACKOUT.

THEN UP TO DIM LIGHT THROUGH THE WINDOW.
A door bangs.
Sound of a key in the door of the room.

DAVIES enters, closes the door, and tries the light switch, on, off, on, off.

It appears to Davies that "the damn light's gone now", but, it becomes clear that Mick has sneaked back into the room in the dark and removed the bulb; he starts up "the electrolux" and scares Davies almost witless before claiming "I was just doing some spring cleaning" and returning the bulb to its socket (45). After a discussion with Davies about the place being his "responsibility" and his ambitions to fix it up, Mick also offers Davies the job of "caretaker" (46–50), but Davies pushes his luck with Mick when he observes negative things about Aston, like the idea that he "doesn't like work" or is "a bit of a funny bloke" for "Not liking work" (Davies' camouflage of what he really is referring to), leading Mick to observe that Davies is "getting hypocritical" and "too glib" (50), and they turn to the absurd details of "a small financial agreement" relating to Davies' possibly doing "a bit of caretaking" or "looking after the place" for Mick (51), and then back to the inevitable call for "references" and the perpetually necessary trip to Sidcup to get Davies' identity "papers" (51–52).

[Scene 3]
Morning

Davies wakes up and complains to Aston about how badly he slept. He blames various aspects of the flat's set up. Aston suggests adjustments but Davies proves to be callous and inflexible. Aston tells the story of how he was checked into a mental hospital and given electric shock therapy, but when he tried to escape from the hospital he was shocked while standing, leaving him with permanent brain damage; he ends by saying, "I've often thought of going back and trying to find the man who did that to me. But I want to do something first. I want to build that shed out in the garden" (54–57). Critics regard Aston's monologue, the longest of the play, as the "climax" of the plot. In dramaturgical terms, what follows is part of the plot's "falling action".

=== Act III ===
[Scene 1]
Two weeks later [… ]Afternoon.

Davies and Mick discuss the flat. Mick relates "(ruminatively)" in great detail what he would do to redecorate it (60). When asked who "would live there", Mick's response "My brother and me" leads Davies to complain about Aston's inability to be social and just about every other aspect of Aston's behaviour (61–63). Though initially invited to be a "caretaker", first by Aston and then by Mick, he begins to ingratiate himself with Mick, who acts as if he were an unwitting accomplice in Davies' eventual conspiracy to take over and fix up the flat without Aston's involvement (64) an outright betrayal of the brother who actually took him in and attempted to find his "belongings"; but just then Aston enters and gives Davies yet another pair of shoes which he grudgingly accepts, speaking of going down to Sidcup in order to get his papers again (65–66).

[Scene 2]
That night

Davies brings up his plan when talking to Aston, whom he insults by throwing back in his face the details of his treatment in the mental institution (66–67), leading Aston, in a vast understatement, to respond: "I . . . I think it's about time you found somewhere else. I don't think we're hitting it off" (68). When finally threatened by Davies pointing a knife at him, Aston tells Davies to leave: "Get your stuff" (69). Davies, outraged, claims that Mick will take his side and kick Aston out instead and leaves in a fury, concluding (mistakenly): "Now I know who I can trust" (69).

[Scene 3]
Later

Davies reenters with Mick explaining the fight that occurred earlier and complaining still more bitterly about Mick's brother, Aston (70–71). Eventually, Mick takes Aston's side, beginning with the observation "You get a bit out of your depth sometimes, don't you?" (71). Mick forces Davies to disclose that his "real name" is Davies and his "assumed name" is "Jenkins" and, after Davies calls Aston "nutty", Mick appears to take offence at what he terms Davies' "impertinent thing to say", concludes, "I'm compelled to pay you off for your caretaking work. Here's half a dollar", and stresses his need to turn back to his own "business" affairs (74). When Aston comes back into the apartment, the brothers face each other", "They look at each other. Both are smiling, faintly" (75). Using the excuse of having returned for his "pipe" (given to him earlier through the generosity of Aston), Davies turns to beg Aston to let him stay (75–77). But Aston rebuffs each of Davies' rationalisations of his past complaints (75–76). The play ends with a "Long silence" as Aston, who "remains still, his back to him [Davies], at the window, apparently unrelenting as he gazes at his garden and makes no response at all to Davies' futile plea, which is sprinkled with many dots (". . .") of elliptical hesitations (77–78).

== Origins and contexts of the play ==
According to Pinter's biographer Michael Billington, the playwright frequently discussed details of The Caretaker's origins in relation to images from his own life. Billington notes in his authorised biography that Pinter said he had written the play while he and his first wife Vivien Merchant were living in Chiswick:

[The flat was] a very clean couple of rooms with a bath and kitchen. There was a chap who owned the house: a builder, in fact, like Mick who had his own van and whom I hardly ever saw. The only image of him was of this swift mover up and down the stairs and of his van going . . . Vroom . . . as he arrived and departed. His brother lived in the house. He was a handyman . . . he managed rather more successfully than Aston, but he was very introverted, very secretive, had been in a mental home some years before and had had some kind of electrical shock treatment . . . ECT, I think . . . Anyway, he did bring a tramp back one night. I call him a tramp, but he was just a homeless old man who stayed three or four weeks.

According to Billington, Pinter described Mick as the most purely invented character of the three. For the tramp, Davies, however, he felt a certain kinship, writing "[The Pinters' life in Chiswick] was a very threadbare existence . . . very . . . I was totally out of work. So I was very close to this old derelict's world, in a way."(Harold Pinter 114–17).

For earlier critics, like Martin Esslin, The Caretaker suggests aspects of the Theatre of the Absurd, described by Esslin in his eponymous book coining that term first published in 1961; according to Esslin, absurdist drama by writers such as Samuel Beckett, Eugène Ionesco, Jean Genet, and Edward Albee, and others was prominent in the late 1950s and early 1960s as a reaction to chaos witnessed in World War II and the state of the world after the war.

Billington observes that "The idea that [Davies] can affirm his identity and recover his papers by journeying to Sidcup is perhaps the greatest delusion of all, although one with its source in reality"; as "Pinter's old Hackney friend Morris Wernick recalls, 'It is undoubtedly true that Harold, with a writer's ear, picked up words and phrases from each of us. He also picked up locales. The Sidcup in The Caretaker comes from the fact that the Royal Artillery HQ was there when I was a National Serviceman and its almost mythical quality as the fount of all permission and record was a source.' To English ears," Billington continues, "Sidcup has faintly comic overtones of suburban respectability. For Davies it is a Kentish Eldorado: the place that can solve all the problems about his unresolved identity and uncertain past, present and future" (122).

About directing a production of The Caretaker at the Roundabout Theatre Company in 2003, David Jones observed:

The trap with Harold's work, for performers and audiences, is to approach it too earnestly or portentously. I have always tried to interpret his plays with as much humour and humanity as possible. There is always mischief lurking in the darkest corners. The world of The Caretaker is a bleak one, its characters damaged and lonely. But they are all going to survive. And in their dance to that end they show a frenetic vitality and a wry sense of the ridiculous that balance heartache and laughter. Funny, but not too funny. As Pinter wrote, back in 1960 : "As far as I am concerned The Caretaker IS funny, up to a point. Beyond that point, it ceases to be funny, and it is because of that point that I wrote it."

Hickling writes in this review of a production directed by Mark Babych in March 2009:

[The Caretaker] remains, however, a remorselessly accurate record of its time. At the center of the drama is the horrifically indiscriminate use of shock therapy, which left one of the characters with brain damage; Matthew Rixon's disturbingly docile Aston is a brilliant portrait of the horrors inflicted by a supposedly civilised state. The climax comes in the harrowing monologue in which he recalls the moment the electrodes were attached. The lights close down on his traumatised features as he speaks, leaving us uncomfortably alone with his thoughts.

Pinter's own comment on the source of three of his major plays is frequently quoted by critics:

I went into a room and saw one person standing up and one person sitting down, and few weeks later I wrote The Room. I went into another room and saw two people sitting down, and a few years later I wrote The Birthday Party. I looked through a door into a third room and saw two people standing up and I wrote The Caretaker.

== Analysis of the characters ==
Aston

When he was younger he was given electric shock therapy that leaves him permanently brain damaged. His efforts to appease the ever-complaining Davies may be seen as an attempt to reach out to others. He desperately seeks a connection in the wrong place and with the wrong people. His main obstacle is his inability to communicate. He is misunderstood by his closest relative, his brother, and thus is completely isolated in his existence. His good-natured attitude makes him vulnerable to exploitation. His dialogue is sparse and often a direct response to something Mick or Davies has said. Aston has dreams of building a shed. The shed to him may represent all the things his life lacks: accomplishment and structure. The shed represents hope for the future.

Davies

Davies manufactures the story of his life, lying or sidestepping some details to avoid telling the whole truth about himself. A non-sequitur. He adjusts aspects of the story of his life according to the people he is trying to impress, influence, or manipulate. As Billington points out, "When Mick suggests that Davies might have been in the services — and even the colonies, Davies retorts: 'I was over there. I was one of the first over there.' He defines himself according to momentary imperatives and other people's suggestions" (122).

Mick

At times violent and ill-tempered, Mick is ambitious. He talks above Davies' ability to comprehend him. His increasing dissatisfaction with Davies leads to a rapprochement with his brother, Aston; though he appears to have distanced himself from Aston prior to the opening of the play, by the end, they exchange a few words and a faint smile. Early in the play, when he first encounters him, Mick attacks Davies, taking him for an intruder in his brother Aston's abode: an attic room of a run-down house which Mick looks after and in which he enables his brother to live. At first, he is aggressive toward Davies. Later, it may be that by suggesting that Davies could be "caretaker" of both his house and his brother, Mick is attempting to shift responsibility from himself onto Davies, who hardly seems a viable candidate for such tasks. The disparities between the loftiness of Mick's "dreams" and needs for immediate results and the mundane realities of Davies's neediness and shifty non-committal nature creates much of the absurdity of the play.

== Style ==
The language and plot of The Caretaker blends Realism with the Theatre of the Absurd. In the Theatre of the Absurd language is used in a manner that heightens the audience's awareness of the language itself, often through repetition and circumventing dialogue.

The play has often been compared to Waiting for Godot, by Samuel Beckett, and other absurdist plays because of its apparent lack of plot and action.

The fluidity of the characters is explained by Ronald Knowles as follows: "Language, character, and being are here aspects of each other made manifest in speech and silence. Character is no longer the clearly perceived entity underlying clarity of articulation the objectification of a social and moral entelechy but something amorphous and contingent (41).

== Language ==
One of the keys to understanding Pinter's language is not to rely on the words a character says but to look for the meaning behind the text. The Caretaker is filled with long rants and non-sequiturs, the language is either choppy dialogue full of interruptions or long speeches that are a vocalised train of thought. Although the text is presented in a casual way, there is always a message behind its simplicity. Pinter is often concerned with "communication itself, or rather the deliberate evasion of communication" (Knowles 43).

The play's staccato language and rhythms are musically balanced through strategically placed pauses. Pinter toys with silence, where it is used in the play and what emphasis it places on the words when they are at last spoken.

== Mode of drama: Tragicomedy ==
The Caretaker is a drama of mixed modes; both tragic and comic, it is a tragicomedy. Elements of comedy appear in the monologues of Davies and Mick, and the characters' interactions at times even approach farce. For instance, the first scene of Act Two, which critics have compared to the hat and shoe sequences in Beckett's Waiting for Godot, is particularly farcical:

ASTON offers the bag to DAVIES.

MICK grabs it.
ASTON takes it.
MICK grabs it.
DAVIES reaches for it.
ASTON takes it.
MICK reaches for it.
ASTON gives it to DAVIES.

MICK grabs it. Pause. (39)

Davies' confusion, repetitions, and attempts to deceive both brothers and to play each one off against the other are also farcical. Davies has pretended to be someone else and used an assumed name, "Bernard Jenkins". But, in response to separate inquiries by Aston and Mick, it appears that Davies' real name is not really "Bernard Jenkins" but that it is "Mac Davies" (as Pinter designates him "Davies" throughout) and that he is actually Welsh and not English, a fact that he is attempting to conceal throughout the play and that motivates him to "get down to Sidcup", the past location of a British Army Records Office, to get his identity "papers" (13–16).

The elements of tragedy occur in Aston's climactic monologue about his shock treatments in "that place" and at the end of the play, though the ending is still somewhat ambiguous: at the very end, it appears that the brothers are turning Davies, an old homeless man, out of what may be his last chance for shelter, mainly because of his (and their) inabilities to adjust socially to one another, or their respective "anti-social" qualities.

== Interpretation ==
In his 1960 book review of The Caretaker, fellow English playwright John Arden writes: "Taken purely at its face value this play is a study of the unexpected strength of family ties against an intruder." As Arden states, family relationships are one of the main thematic concerns of the play.

Another prevalent theme is the characters' inability to communicate productively with one another. The play depends more on dialogue than on action; however, though there are fleeting moments in which each of them does seem to reach some understanding with the other, more often, they avoid communicating with one another as a result of their own psychological insecurities and self-concerns.

The theme of isolation appears to result from the characters' inability to communicate with one another, and the characters' own insularity seems to exacerbate their difficulty communicating with others.

As the characters also engage in deceiving one another and themselves, deception and self-deception are motifs, and certain deceptive phrases and self-deceptive strategies recur as refrains throughout the dialogue. Davies uses an assumed name and has convinced himself that he is really going to resolve his problems relating to his lack of identity papers, even though he appears too lazy to take any such responsibility for his own actions and blames his inaction on the weather. Aston believes that his dream of building a shed will eventually reach fruition, despite his mental disability. Mick believes that his ambitions for a successful career outweigh his responsibility to care for his mentally damaged brother. In the end however all three men are deceiving themselves. Their lives may continue on beyond the end of the play just as they are at the beginning and throughout it. The deceit and isolation in the play lead to a world where time, place, identity, and language are ambiguous and fluid.

== Production history ==
=== Premiere ===
On 27 April 1960, the first production of The Caretaker opened at the Arts Theatre, in London, prior to transferring to the West End's Duchess Theatre on 30 May 1960. It starred Donald Pleasence as Davies, Alan Bates as Mick, and Peter Woodthorpe as Aston. The productions received generally strong reviews.

=== Other notable productions and major revivals ===
- 1961 – Lyceum Theatre, New York City, on 4 October 1961 by Roger L. Stevens, Frederick Brisson, and Gilbert Miller. Directed by Donald McWhinnie. Setting: Bert Currah, Sets Supervised and lighting: Paul Morrison, Production Supervisor: Fred Herbert, Stage Manager/Understudy: Joel Fabiani

Cast: Alan Bates (Mick), Donald Pleasence (Davies), and Robert Shaw (Aston).

- 1972 – Residenz Theatre, Munich directed by August Everding

Cast: Heinz Rühmann (Davies), Gerd Baltus (Aston) and Michael Schwarzmaier (Mick)

- 1976 – Virginia Museum Theater (VMT), directed by James Kirkland. Part of the mission of the Virginia Museum at the time was to disseminate the arts, including drama, widely to the people of Virginia. In this regard, it is noteworthy that this was the second Pinter play to be produced by VMT, showing the increasing popularity of his works. This production followed the company's statewide tour of The Homecoming two years previously.
- 1981 – Royal National Theatre. Directed by Kenneth Ives.

Cast: Jonathan Pryce, Kenneth Cranham, and Warren Mitchell

- 1983 – Royal Exchange, Manchester directed by Richard Negri

Cast: Charlie Drake (Davies), Jonathan Hackett (Aston) and Tim McInnerny (Mick). Michael Angelis also played one of the two brothers.

- 1990 – Sherman Theatre, Cardiff (24 October – 10 November)

Cast: Miriam Karlin played Davies – the first time a woman performed the title role – with Mark Lewis Jones (Aston) and Gary Lilburn (Mick). Directed by Annie Castledine.

- 1991 – Comedy Theatre, London. Directed by Harold Pinter.

Cast: Donald Pleasence, Peter Howitt and Colin Firth

- 1993 – The Studio Theatre, Washington, D.C. (12 September – 24 October)

Cast: Emery Battis, Richard Thompson, John Tindle.

- 2000 – Comedy Theatre, London, November 2000 – February 2001. Directed by Patrick Marber. Designer, Rob Howell; lighting, Hugh Vanstone; sound, Simon Baker (for Autograph Sound). Associate Director, Gari Jones

Cast: Michael Gambon (Davies), Rupert Graves (Mick), and Douglas Hodge (Aston)

- 2003 – Roundabout Theatre Company, New York City. Directed by David Jones. Set design: John Beatty, Costume design: Jane Greenwood, Lighting: Peter Lezorowski. Design: Scott Lehrer.

Cast: Patrick Stewart (Davies), Aidan Gillen (Mick), and Kyle MacLachlan (Aston).

- 2005 – Zephyr Theatre. Los Angeles. Directed by Matt Gottlieb.

Cast Robert Mandan (Davies), Steve Spiro (Mick) and Jaxon Duff Gwillim (Aston).

- 2006 – Sheffield Theatres, part of UK tour in 2006–2007 season. Directed by Jamie Lloyd.

Cast Nigel Harman, David Bradley, and Con O'Neill.

- 2006–2007 – "Le gardien". Théâtre de l'Oeuvre. Transferred to the Théâtre de Paris. Directed by Didier Long.

Cast: Robert Hirsch, Samuel Labarthe and Cyrille Thouvenin.

- 2007 – The English Theatre of Hamburg. Directed by Clifford Dean.

Cast: Hayward Morse, Steven Lello, and Scott Smith.

- 2008 – Guthrie Theater, Minneapolis. Directed by Benjamin McGovern.

Cast: Stephen Cartmell, Steven Epp, and Kris L. Nelson.

- 2009 – Everyman Theatre, Liverpool. Directed by Christopher Morahan.

Cast: Jonathan Pryce (Davies), Peter McDonald (Aston), Tom Brooke (Mick).

- 2010 – London Classic Theatre (touring production). Directed by Michael Cabot.

Cast: Nicholas Gadd, Nicholas Gasson, and Richard Stemp.

- 2011 – Writers' Theatre, Glencoe, Illinois. Directed by Ron OJ Parson.

Cast: Kareem Bandealy, Anish Jethmalani and Bill Norris.

- Broadcast on BBC Radio 4, 2:30PM Sat, 27 November 2010, repeated 2:30PM Sat, 28 April 2012: Davies read by David Warner, Aston by Tony Bell and Mick by Daniel Mays, directed by Peter Kavanagh.
- 2016 – The Old Vic Theatre, London. Directed by Matthew Warchus.

Cast: Timothy Spall, Daniel Mays, and George MacKay.

- 2017 – Bristol Old Vic, Bristol. Directed by Christopher Haydon.

Cast: Patrice Naiambana, David Judge, Jonathan Livingstone.

== Film adaptation ==
- The Caretaker (1963)

== Awards and nominations ==
=== Original Broadway production ===
Year	Award	Category	Nominee	Result
1962	Tony Award	Best Play		Nominated
1962	Tony Award	Best Actor in a Play	Donald Pleasence	Nominated
1962	Tony Award	Best Direction of a Play	Donald McWhinnie	Nominated

=== 2003 Broadway revival ===
Year	Award	Category	Nominee	Result
2004	Tony Awards	Best Featured Actor in a Play	Aidan Gillen	Nominated
2004	Drama Desk Award	Outstanding Featured Actor in a Play	Aidan Gillen	Nominated

== Works cited ==
Arden, John. Book review of The Caretaker, by Harold Pinter. New Theatre Mag. 1.4 (July 1960): 29–30.

Billington, Michael. Harold Pinter. 1996. London: Faber and Faber, 2007. ISBN 978-0-571-23476-9 (13). Updated 2nd ed. of The Life and Work of Harold Pinter. 1996. London: Faber and Faber, 1997. ISBN 0-571-17103-6 (10). Print.

Esslin, Martin. The Theatre of the Absurd. 1961. 3rd ed. New York: Vintage Books, 2004. ISBN 1-4000-7523-8 (10). ISBN 978-1-4000-7523-2 (13). Print.

Hickling, Alfred. "The Caretaker: Octagon, Bolton". Guardian. Guardian Media Group, 13 March 2009. Web. 28 May 2009. (Rev. of production directed by Mark Babych.)

Jones, David. "Travels with Harold". Front & Center Online. Roundabout Theatre Company, Fall 2003. Web. 12 March 2009. ("Online version of the Roundabout Theatre Company's subscriber magazine.")

Knowles, Roland. The Birthday Party and The Caretaker: Text and Performance. London: Macmillan Education, 1988. 41–43. Print.

Naismith, Bill. Harold Pinter. Faber Critical Guides. London: Faber and Faber, 2000. ISBN 0-571-19781-7. Print.

Pinter, Harold. The Caretaker: A Play in Three Acts. London: Encore Publishing Co., 1960. OCLC 10322991. Print.

–––. The Caretaker and The Dumb Waiter: Two Plays by Harold Pinter 1960. New York: Grove Press, 1988. ISBN 0-8021-5087-X (10). ISBN 978-0-8021-5087-5 (13). Print.

Powlick, Leonard. " 'What the hell is that all about?' A Peek at Pinter's Dramaturgy." Harold Pinter: Critical Approaches. Ed. Steven H. Gale. Cranbury, NJ: Associated UP, 1986. 30–37. Print.

Richardson, Brian. Performance review of The Caretaker, Studio Theatre (Washington D.C.), 12 September 1993. The Pinter Review: Annual Essays 1994. Ed. Francis Gillen and Steven H. Gale. Tampa: U of Tampa P, 1994. 109–10. Print.

Scott, Michael, ed. Harold Pinter: The Birthday Party, The Caretaker, The Homecoming: A Case Book. London: Macmillan Education, 1986. Print.
