= It's Alright, It's OK =

It's Alright, It's OK may refer to:

- "It's Alright, It's OK" (Ashley Tisdale song), 2009
- "It's Alright, It's OK" (Primal Scream song), 2013
- "It's Alright, It's OK", a song by Shirley Caesar and Anthony Hamilton from the 2016 album Fill This House

== See also ==
- It's Alright (disambiguation)
- It's OK (disambiguation)
