= Snapshots (Kim Wilde album) =

Studio album by Kim Wilde
- Released: 26 August 2011
- Recorded: 2010–2011
- Genre: Pop rock
- Length: 51:29
- Label: Columbia SevenOne, Sony Music Germany
- Producer: Alex G. (tracks: 1, 6), Alex Rethwisch (tracks: 2, 3, 4, 10, 12), Andrew Murray (tracks: 5, 7, 8, 9, 11, 13), Ricky Wilde (tracks: 5, 7, 8, 9, 11, 13, 14)

Kim Wilde chronology
Come Out and Play (2010)	Snapshots (2011)	Wilde Winter Songbook (2013)

Singles from Snapshots
- 1. "It's Alright" / "Sleeping Satellite" Released: 19 August 2011; 2. "To France" Released: 2 December 2011; 3. "Ever Fallen in Love" Released: 24 February 2012

Snapshots is the 12th studio album and the first covers album by British singer Kim Wilde. It was released in Germany on 26 August 2011 by Columbia SevenOne. The album features versions of songs hand-picked by Wilde from the last five decades. It was later released in other European countries, including the United Kingdom, on 28 November 2011.

== Background ==
The album was preceded by its lead single, which is a double release of "It's Alright" and "Sleeping Satellite", originally recorded by East 17 and Tasmin Archer respectively. They were released on 19 August 2011 and both songs have an accompanying music video. Also on the album is a duet with her husband Hal Fowler on the final track "Kooks", originally by David Bowie. The digital download version of the album available on the iTunes Store includes the bonus track "I'll Stand by You", originally by the Pretenders, as well as the music videos for "It's Alright" and "Sleeping Satellite". A track-by-track interview was also available as an extra bonus for those who pre-ordered the album on iTunes. Another bonus track has been made available on an exclusive edition of the album only sold at Saturn stores. The song included is "Forever Young", originally recorded by Alphaville and first covered by Laura Branigan.

"To France", originally by Mike Oldfield featuring Maggie Reilly, was released digitally on 2 December 2011 as the second single from the album. It includes a brand new Christmas remix of the song as well as a remix of "It's Alright". The third single "Ever Fallen in Love (With Someone You Shouldn't've)", originally by the Buzzcocks, was released on 24 February 2012, under the shortened title of "Ever Fallen in Love", to promote Wilde's European tour. It was again only released digitally and includes a previously unreleased cover of "Spirit in the Sky", originally by Norman Greenbaum.

== Track listing ==
No.	Title	Writer(s)	Original Artist	Length
1.	"It's Alright"	Anthony Mortimer	East 17	4:17
2.	"In Between Days"	Robert Smith	The Cure	3:06
3.	"About You Now"	Lukasz Gottwald, Cathy Dennis	Sugababes	3:34
4.	"Sleeping Satellite"	Tasmin Archer, John Beck, John Hughes	Tasmin Archer	4:09
5.	"To France"	Mike Oldfield	Mike Oldfield	3:59
6.	"A Little Respect"	Vince Clarke, Andy Bell	Erasure	3:22
7.	"Remember Me"	Nickolas Ashford, Valerie Simpson	Diana Ross	3:50
8.	"Anyone Who Had a Heart"	Burt Bacharach, Hal David	Dionne Warwick	3:50
9.	"Wonderful Life"	Colin Vearncombe	Black	4:50
10.	"They Don't Know"	Kirsty MacColl	Kirsty MacColl	2:38
11.	"Beautiful Ones"	Brett Anderson, Richard Oakes	Suede	3:47
12.	"Just What I Needed"	Ric Ocasek	The Cars	3:45
13.	"Ever Fallen in Love (With Someone You Shouldn't've)"	Pete Shelley	Buzzcocks	3:15
14.	"Kooks" (with Hal Fowler)	David Bowie	David Bowie	2:53

Exclusive edition bonus track
No.	Title	Writer(s)	Original Artist	Length
15.	"Forever Young"	Bernhard Lloyd, Marian Gold, Frank Mertens	Alphaville	3:56

iTunes Store bonus tracks
No.	Title	Writer(s)	Original Artist	Length
15.	"I'll Stand by You"	Chrissie Hynde, Tom Kelly, Billy Steinberg	The Pretenders	3:41
16.	"It's Alright" (Music video)			3:14
17.	"Sleeping Satellite" (Music video)			3:33
18.	"Track by Track" (Pre-order only video)

== Charts ==
Chart (2011)	Peak position
German Albums (Offizielle Top 100)	14
Swiss Albums (Schweizer Hitparade)	27

== Release history ==
Country	Date	Label	Format	Edition	Catalogue
Germany	5 August 2011	Columbia SevenOne	CD	Promo	88697941192
Germany	26 August 2011	Columbia SevenOne	CD, digital download	Standard	88697941172
Germany	26 August 2011	Columbia SevenOne	CD	Exclusive	88697959122
Germany	26 August 2011	Columbia SevenOne	Digital download	iTunes Store	G010002690274K
United Kingdom	28 November 2011	Sony Music	Digital download	Standard	
