= Gold (East 17 song) =

1992 single by East 17

Single by East 17

from the album Walthamstow
- Released: 2 November 1992
- Length: 4:20
- Label: London
- Songwriter: Tony Mortimer
- Producers: Ian Curnow; Phil Harding

East 17 singles chronology
| "House of Love" (1992) | "Gold" (1992) | "Deep" (1993) |

Music video
- "Gold" on YouTube

"Gold" is a song by English boy band East 17, taken from the band's debut album, Walthamstow (1993). Written by Tony Mortimer and produced by Ian Curnow and Phil Harding, it was released on 2 November 1992 by London Records as the second single from the album. In Australia, it instead served as the album's fifth single in November 1993. "Gold" was successful in only a few countries, peaking at number two in Sweden, number three in Finland, and number 28 in the UK. A music video was produced to promote the single, directed by Jaswinder Bancil, depicting the band performing the track whilst wearing angel wings.

== Critical reception ==
Sharon Mawer from AllMusic felt the song could easily have been recorded by the Pet Shop Boys, "as the intro and chorus had their lush orchestration and smooth vocals, although the verses featured Tony Mortimer rapping about the futility of war and the need to live together in harmony on this planet." In his weekly UK chart commentary, James Masterton wrote, "With their tracks having a harder dance feel to them unlike most teen bands their future looks set to follow soundalikes EMF. Watch this climb."

Alan Jones from Music Week gave the song three out of five, describing it as "energetic and slick pop, with the Walthamstow boys more in control of their own destiny." In his review of the Walthamstow album, Neil Spencer from The Observer found that 'House of Love' and 'Gold' "prove the more inane offerings from a mix of junior hip-hop and melodic pop". Ted Kessler from Select wrote, "Love them or loathe them, 'House of Love' and 'Gold' were perfectly fashioned hits: spanking contemporary production and sounds, crass, horribly infectious choruses and easily absorbed dance routines." Mark Frith from Smash Hits also gave it three out of five, saying it's "quite good — memorable, light and poppy".

== Track listings ==
- CD and cassette single
1. "Gold" (7-inch Collar Size)
2. "Gold" (The Dark Bark mix)
3. "Gold" (Paws on the Floor mix)
4. "Gold" (The Rabid mix)
- 7-inch single

A. "Gold" (7-inch Collar Size)
B. "Gold" (The Soho demo)

- 12-inch single

A1. "Gold" (The Dark Bark mix)
A2. "Gold" (The Techno Bonio mix)
B1. "Gold" (Paws on the Floor mix)
B2. "Gold" (The Rabid mix)

== Charts ==
=== Weekly charts ===
| Chart (1992–1993) | Peak position |
|---|---|
| Australia (ARIA) | 101 |
| Estonia (Eesti Top 20) | 11 |
| Europe (Eurochart Hot 100) | 36 |
| Finland (Suomen virallinen lista) | 3 |
| Israel (Israeli Singles Chart) | 1 |
| Sweden (Sverigetopplistan) | 2 |
| Switzerland (Schweizer Hitparade) | 35 |
| UK Singles (Official Charts) | 28 |
| UK Airplay (Music Week) | 37 |
| UK Dance (Music Week) | 29 |
| UK Club Chart (Music Week) | 38 |

=== Year-end charts ===
| Chart (1992) | Position |
|---|---|
| Israel (Israeli Singles Chart) | 10 |
| Sweden (Topplistan) | 76 |

| Chart (1993) | Position |
|---|---|
| Sweden (Topplistan) | 36 |

== Release history ==
| Region | Date | Format(s) | Label(s) | Ref. |
|---|---|---|---|---|
| United Kingdom | 2 November 1992 | 7-inch vinyl; 12-inch vinyl; CD; cassette | London | |
| Australia | 8 November 1993 | CD; cassette | London; Polydor | |
