= It's Alright (East 17 song) =

1993 single by East 17

Single by East 17

from the album Walthamstow
- Released: 22 November 1993
- Genre: Dance-pop
- Length: 4:41 (The Guvnor mix); 5:18 (The Ballad mix)
- Label: London
- Songwriter: Tony Mortimer
- Producers: Phil Harding; Ian Curnow; Richard Stannard; Neil James Stainton

East 17 singles chronology
"West End Girls" (1993)	"It's Alright" (1993)	"Around the World" (1994)

Music video
- "It's Alright" on YouTube

"It's Alright" is a song by English boy band East 17, released in November 1993 by London Records as the sixth and last single from their debut album, Walthamstow (1993). The song was written by band member Tony Mortimer, and produced by Phil Harding, Ian Curnow, Richard Stannard and Neil James Stainton. The single version, labelled the "Guvnor mix", begins with a slow ballad-like intro for the first minute, before converting to the techno-house sound for the rest of the track.

"It's Alright" became a worldwide hit, reaching number three on the UK Singles Chart and topping the charts of Australia, France, Ireland, Israel, and Switzerland. The accompanying music video was directed by Chris Clunn and Lawrence Watson, depicting the band performing onstage. In 2011, English singer and songwriter Kim Wilde recorded a cover of the song for her 12th album, Snapshots (2011), which charted in Germany.

== Critical reception ==
In his weekly UK chart commentary, James Masterton complimented "It's Alright" as "classic East 17", "starting mellow with a piano before launching into a hardcore dance beat." Victoria Segal from Melody Maker named it a "pop spectacular", noting "the cocky thump" of the song, "with its stud farm lyrics (We are the seed of the new breed)". In his review of Walthamstow, Alan Jones from Music Week found that the track "rings the changes; a reggae rollercoaster that moves from a UB40-style lead vocal through ragga and dub." On the single release, he gave it four out of five, adding, "The teen market has become somewhat more crowded since East 17's last single, but their stock is still high and this unusual track should confirm their standing behind Take That." Ted Kessler from Select wrote that "It's Alright" "could grace a Galliano album". German band Culture Beat reviewed it for Smash Hits, giving it three out of five. Tania Evans said, "I like the song, the chords are nice and the contrast where it speeds up. What they do isn't so bad." Buddy Iahn noted that "It's Alright" "has some techno influences, particularly in the chorus".

== Chart performance ==
In Europe, "It's Alright" peaked at number one in France, Ireland and Switzerland while reaching number two in both Germany and Lithuania. Additionally, the single was a top-10 hit in Austria, Belgium, the Netherlands, Norway and the United Kingdom, as well as on the Eurochart Hot 100, where it reached number four. In the UK, "It's Alright" peaked at number three during its seventh week on the UK Singles Chart, on 9 January 1994. The song also was a top-20 hit in Denmark and a top-30 hit in Sweden. Outside Europe, it reached number one in Australia, where it spent seven consecutive weeks at the top and ended the year as the fourth-highest-selling single. In Israel, the song spent five weeks at number one. "It's Alright" earned a gold record in France, a silver record in the UK, and a platinum record in Australia and Germany.

== Music video ==
The music video for "It's Alright" was directed by Chris Clunn and Lawrence Watson. They had previously directed the video for "Slow It Down". "It's Alright" begins with band members Brian Harvey and Tony Mortimer in a dark room, in front of a red stage curtain. Harvey sings while Mortimer plays the piano. As the rhythm kicks in, the band appears performing on a stage in front of a large crowd of young people. Different colors appear in the backdrop throughout the video, and the members of the band often performs while standing on large pyramide-like stairs. As the video nears its end, we're back with Harvey in front of the red stage curtain again. "It's Alright" was a Box Top on British music television channel The Box in the beginning of January 1994. In February, the video received heavy rotation on MTV Europe and was A-listed on Germany's VIVA.

== Track listings ==
- CD and 7-inch single
1. "It's Alright" (The Guvnor mix) – 4:43
2. "It's Alright" (The Ballad mix) – 5:18
- CD maxi
1. "It's Alright" (The Guvnor mix) – 4:43
2. "It's Alright" (The Ballad mix) – 5:18
3. "It's Alright" (Diss-cuss mix) – 6:53
4. "It's Alright" (Diss-cuss dub) – 7:02
5. "It's Alright" (Uncle Bob's All Strung Out mix) – 7:08
- 12-inch maxi
1. "It's Alright" (The Guvnor mix)
2. "It's Alright" (Diss-cuss mix)
3. "It's Alright" (Uncle Bob's All Strung Out mix)
- CD maxi – Remixes
1. "It's Alright" (Uncle Bob's All Strung Out mix) – 7:10
2. "It's Alright" (Big Boss mix) – 3:42
3. "It's Alright" (Swing mix) – 3:53
4. "It's Alright" (BiffCo mix) – 8:59

== Charts ==
=== Weekly charts ===
Chart (1993–1994)	Peak position
Australia (ARIA)	1
Austria (Ö3 Austria Top 40)	5
Belgium (Ultratop 50 Flanders)	6
Belgium (Ultratop 50 Wallonia)	3
Denmark (IFPI)	15
Europe (Eurochart Hot 100)	4
Europe (European Hit Radio)	18
Europe (Channel Crossovers)	8
Finland (Suomen virallinen lista)	15
France (SNEP)	1
France Airplay (SNEP)	1
Germany (GfK)	2
Greece (IFPI Greece)	6
Ireland (IRMA)	1
Israel (Israeli Singles Chart)	1
Japan International (Oricon)	12
Latvia (Latvijas Top 20)	1
Lithuania (M-1)	2
Netherlands (Dutch Top 40)	4
Netherlands (Single Top 100)	4
Norway (VG-lista)	8
Sweden (Sverigetopplistan)	26
Switzerland (Schweizer Hitparade)	1
UK Singles (Official Charts)	3
UK Airplay (Music Week)	3

=== Year-end charts ===
Chart (1993)	Position
UK Singles (OCC)	44

Chart (1994)	Position
Australia (ARIA)	4
Austria (Ö3 Austria Top 40)	21
Belgium (Ultratop 50 Flanders)	46
Europe (Eurochart Hot 100)	9
France (SNEP)	10
France Airplay (SNEP)	10
Germany (Media Control)	8
Israel (Israeli Singles Chart)	5
Latvia (Latvijas Top 50)	20
Netherlands (Dutch Top 40)	45
Netherlands (Single Top 100)	39
Switzerland (Schweizer Hitparade)	9
UK Singles (OCC)	95

== Certifications and sales ==
Region	Certification	Certified units/sales
Australia (ARIA)	Platinum	70,000^{^}
France (SNEP)	Gold	250,000^{*}
Germany (BVMI)	Platinum	500,000^{^}
United Kingdom (BPI)	Silver	200,000^{^}
^{*} Sales figures based on certification alone.^{^} Shipments figures based on certification alone.

== Release history ==
Region	Date	Format(s)	Label(s)	Ref.
United Kingdom	22 November 1993	CD; cassette	London	
Japan	20 December 1993	Mini-CD	London	
Australia	7 February 1994	CD; cassette	London; Polydor	

== Kim Wilde version ==
"It's Alright"

Single by Kim Wilde

from the album Snapshots
- A-side: "Sleeping Satellite"
- Released: 19 August 2011
- Length: 3:20
- Label: Columbia SevenOne
- Songwriter: Anthony Mortimer

Kim Wilde singles chronology
"Real Life" (2010)	"It's Alright" / "Sleeping Satellite" (2011)	"To France" (2011)

English singer and songwriter Kim Wilde recorded a cover of "It's Alright" for 2011 for her 12th album, Snapshots (2011). It was released as a double lead single with "Sleeping Satellite", originally performed by Tasmin Archer, on 19 August 2011. A Groove Coverage remix of the song was also released, as the B-side to the album's second single, "To France".

=== Music video ===
The accompanying music video for "It's Alright" premiered on 28 July 2011 exclusively on the German website of video hosting service MyVideo. It was recorded at the Kameha Hotel in Bonn and was directed by Nikolaj Georgiew.

The video features Wilde and her band in a conference room at the hotel, where they perform the song. In between, there are segments featuring Wilde singing in other areas of the hotel.

=== Track listings ===
- CD single
1. "It's Alright" (radio edit) – 3:20
2. "Sleeping Satellite" (radio edit) – 3:30
- Digital download
1. "It's Alright" (radio edit) – 3:20
2. "Sleeping Satellite" (radio edit) – 3:30
3. "It's Alright" (music video) – 3:14
4. "Sleeping Satellite" (music video) – 3:33

=== Charts ===
Chart (2011)	Peak position
Germany (Official German Charts)	98

== In popular culture ==
The song came back to the public eye in February 2009, with the yoghurt company Müller playing "It's Alright" as the background song for their new advert. In the same year, it was featured in another advert, this time for More Th>n car insurance. In 2010, it was also used in the final montage in the series-ending episode of Big Brother's Big Mouth in the United Kingdom.

In June 2015 the song was featured in an advertisement for the mobile network 3, in which it is lip-synched by a purple puppet, made by Jim Henson's Creature Shop, named Jackson.
