= Slow It Down =

Slow It Down may refer to:

- "Slow It Down" (East 17 song), 1993
- "Slow It Down" (Amy Macdonald song), 2012
- "Slow It Down" (Benson Boone song), 2024
- "Slow It Down", a 2018 song by Charlie Puth from Voicenotes
- "Slow It Down", a 2013 song by The-Dream from IV Play
- "Slow It Down", a 2017 song by Kim Petras from Era 1
- "Slow It Down", a 2012 song by the Lumineers from The Lumineers
- "Slow It Down", a 2023 song by Nas from Magic 2
- "Slow It Down", a 2009 song by Tyler, the Creator from Bastard
