= It's Alright =

It's Alright or It's All Right may refer to:

== Music ==
=== Albums ===
- It's All Right! (Teddy Edwards album), a 1967 jazz album by Teddy Edwards
- It's All Right! (Wynton Kelly album), a 1964 jazz album
- It's Alright (I See Rainbows), a 1982 album by Yoko Ono
- It's Alright, a 1977 album by Frank Sinatra Jr.

=== Songs ===
- "It's All Right" (The Impressions song), 1963
- "But It's Alright" (a.k.a. "It's Alright"), by J.J. Jackson, 1966
- "It's Alright" (311 song), 2009
- "It's Alright" (Classic Example song), 1992
- "It's Alright" (East 17 song), 1993
- "It's Alright" (Echo & the Bunnymen song), 2001
- "It's Alright (Baby's Coming Back)", 1985, by Eurythmics
- "It's Alright" (Deni Hines song), 1995
- "It's Alright" (Jay-Z and Memphis Bleek song), 1998
- "It's Alright" (Kaycee Grogan song), 1996
- "It's Alright" (Ricky Martin song), 2006
- "It's Alright" (Chanté Moore song), 1992
- "It's Alright" (Pet Shop Boys song), 1987, originally by Sterling Void, later covered by Pet Shop Boys from the album Introspective
- "It's Alright" (Queen Latifah song), 1997
- "It's All Right", 1963 song, B-side to Gerry and the Pacemakers' "You'll Never Walk Alone"
- "It's All Right", a song by Joe Walsh from his album Songs for a Dying Planet
- "It's Alright", by The American Analog Set, from the album The Fun of Watching Fireworks
- "It's Alright", by Big Head Todd and the Monsters, from the album Sister Sweetly
- "It's Alright", by Black Sabbath, from the album Technical Ecstasy
- "It's Alright", by Candlebox, from the album Happy Pills
- "It's Alright", by The Cockroaches from their 1987 album The Cockroaches
- "It's Alright", by Fabolous
- "It's OK (It's Alright", by Fine Young Cannibals from their 1989 album The Raw & the Cooked
- "It's Alright", by Five from Invincible
- "It's Alright", by The Kinks, B-side to the single "You Really Got Me"
- "It's Alright", by Matt & Kim
- "It's All Right", by Ray Charles, from the album Yes Indeed!
- "It's Alright", by S Club 7 from their 2001 album Sunshine
- "It's Alright", by Yoko Ono, from the album It's Alright (I See Rainbows)
- "It's Alright", theme song to the BBC's New Tricks
- "It's Alright (So Far)", by The 1975
- "It's Alright" by Paul Stanley, from his 1978 album Paul Stanley
- "It's Alright", by Mother Mother, from the album Dance and Cry
- "It's Alright", 2021 song from My Little Pony: A New Generation

== Entertainment ==
- It's All Right! (TV series)

== See also ==
- I'm Alright (disambiguation)
