= Tom Milne =

British film critic (1926–2005)

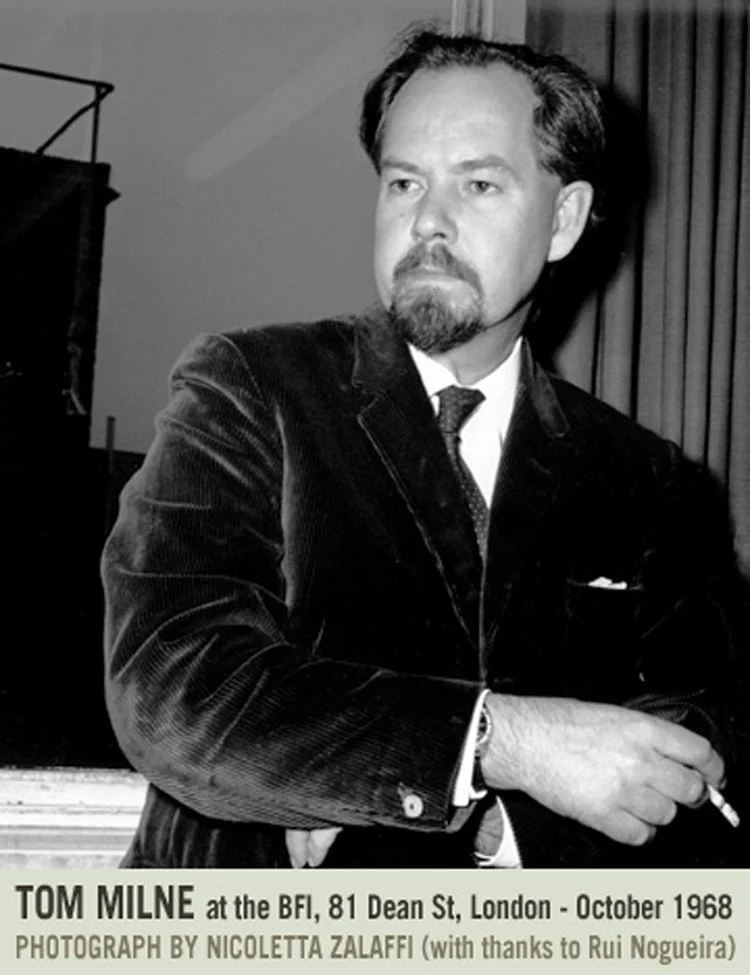
- Born: 2 April 1926; Malacca, Malaya
- Died: 14 December 2005 (aged 79); Aberdeen, Scotland
- Occupation: Film critic

Tom Milne (2 April 1926 – 14 December 2005) was a British film critic.

Milne was born in Malacca, Malaya. At the age of nine he was sent home to Aberdeen, and from there went on to Trinity College, Glenalmond. His war time service was with the Fleet Air Arm as a meteorologist, spending his last year in New Guinea. Following demobilisation, he studied English and French at the University of Aberdeen and later at the Sorbonne. He taught in a French lycée before returning to Britain, working initially in an antiquarian bookshop in London. Interested in the theatre too, he wrote for the magazine Encore, which existed for a decade (1954 to 1965).

Milne wrote for Sight & Sound, the Monthly Film Bulletin, The Observer and The Times during his career. During the 1960s he was associate editor of Sight & Sound and editor of the Monthly Film Bulletin. His book length studies of film directors include monographs on Joseph Losey (1968) and Rouben Mamoulian (1969) in the Thames & Hudson Cinema One series, the former comprising a series of extended interviews with the director. He also wrote a short study on the Danish director Carl Theodor Dreyer (1971) and edited and translated an anthology of interviews and writings on Jean-Luc Godard (1972).

In addition, Tom Milne oversaw the translation and subtitling of French films for television screenings. He was the founding editor of the Time Out Film Guide, which went through nineteen editions from 1989 through 2010.

In 1993, he returned to Aberdeen to live with his sister, Eileen. An archive of over 3000 novels that were the personal collection of Tom Milne is held at Lancaster University Library.
