= House of Love (East 17 song) =

1992 single by East 17

- UK and European artwork. The Australian artwork has the central image mirrored.

Single by East 17

from the album Walthamstow
- Released: 10 August 1992
- Recorded: September 1991
- Genre: House
- Length: 4:37
- Label: London
- Songwriters: Tony Mortimer; Robin Goodfellow
- Producer: Robin Goodfellow

East 17 singles chronology
"House of Love" (1992)	"Gold" (1992)

Music video
- "House of Love" on YouTube

Alternative cover
- US promo CD artwork

"House of Love" is a song by British boy band East 17 from their first studio album, Walthamstow (1993). London Records released the song as their debut single in August 1992. Written by band member Tony Mortimer with the track's producer, Robin Goodfellow, it became a number-one hit in Finland, Israel and Sweden. It also entered the top 40 in several other countries between 1992 and 1994. In the United Kingdom, "House of Love" peaked at number 10 on the UK Singles Chart. Two different music videos were produced to promote the single. Rolling Stone magazine ranked the song at number 75 on their list of the "75 Greatest Boy Band Songs of All Time" in 2020.

== Background ==
Initially conceived by former Pet Shop Boys manager Tom Watkins as a tougher version of Take That, East 17 decided that their first single—like Take That's debut—should be an upbeat dance number that would sell to both teenagers and to clubs. Inspired by current dance groups like the KLF and Snap!, Tony Mortimer wrote "House of Love" as a mock 'rave' anthem, complete with a 'harmony' rap performed by Brian Harvey. Mortimer rapped the main verses with the entire band singing the chorus. The Pedigree Mix of the song, complete with an explosion and then a dog barking at the beginning and the end, was released as the single, complete with a low-budget video.

"House of Love" rose to No. 10 on the UK Singles Chart, establishing East 17 as a premier pop act. It was included on their first album, Walthamstow, and their 1996 greatest hits compilation. On 15 April 2011, T-Mobile uploaded a video parody of the JK Wedding Entrance Dance portraying the wedding of Prince William and Catherine Middleton weeks before the actual Royal Wedding using choreography with the group's song.

== Critical reception ==
Adam Sweeting from The Guardian remarked that the band "take aim at the dance floor" on the song. David Bennun from Melody Maker wrote, "...and East 17, a posse of hippety-hoppety wee whippersnappers, lamenting the decline of Mother Earth in the most simplistically eco-conscious manner imaginable." Another Melody Maker editor, Victoria Segal, added, "Stupidstupidstupid lyrics over blasts of adrenalin that made you grin like a lunatic from the word boom!, this was East 17 pumped and primed and ready to go."

Neil Spencer from The Observer said the song "prove the more inane offerings from a mix of junior hip-hop and melodic pop". Ted Kessler from Select wrote, "Love them or loathe them, 'House of Love' and 'Gold' were perfectly fashioned hits: spanking contemporary production and sounds, crass, horribly infectious choruses and easily absorbed dance routines." Carl Fysh from Seventeen named it a "hard-hitting house anthem". Tom Doyle from Smash Hits gave it four out of five, commenting, "Looking a bit like a cross between Take That and Flowered Up in their trendy Essex techno gear, E17 [sic] come up with this well catchy tune with background barking supplied by their dog".

== Music video ==
There were made two different music videos for the song: a European and an American version. The latter was directed by Scott Kennedy.

== Track listings ==
- UK CD and cassette single
1. "House of Love" (Pedigree mix)
2. "House of Love" (Son of a Bitch mix)
3. "House of Love" (Glossy Coat mix)
4. "House of Love" (Wet Nose mix)
- UK 7-inch single; French and Japanese single
1. "House of Love" (Pedigree mix) – 4:37
2. "House of Love" (The Expedient demo) – 7:43
- UK 12-inch single

A1. "House of Love" (Son of a Bitch mix)
A2. "House of Love" (Glossy Coat mix)
B1. "House of Love" (Wet Nose mix)

- US 12-inch single

A1. "House of Love" (Son of a Bitch mix) — 9:02
A2. "House of Love" (Wet Nose mix) — 6:04
B1. "House of Love" (Murk's main mix) — 6:41
B2. "House of Love" (Oscar G's Dope dub) — 6:45

- US cassette single

A. "House of Love" (Pedigree mix) — 4:37
B. "House of Love" (Son of a Bitch mix) — 9:02

- Australian CD and cassette single
1. "House of Love" (Pedigree mix)
2. "House of Love" (Wet Nose mix)

== Charts ==
=== Weekly charts ===
Chart (1992–1994)	Peak position
Australia (ARIA)	5
Austria (Ö3 Austria Top 40)	7
Belgium (Ultratop 50 Flanders)	32
Estonia (Eesti Top 30)	2
Europe (Eurochart Hot 100)	9
Europe (European Dance Radio)	18
Finland (Suomen virallinen lista)	1
France (SNEP)	8
France Airplay (SNEP)	6
Germany (GfK)	6
Greece (IFPI Greece)	4
Ireland (IRMA)	16
Israel (Israeli Singles Chart)	1
Japan International (Oricon)	8
Netherlands (Dutch Top 40)	31
Netherlands (Single Top 100)	21
New Zealand (Recorded Music NZ)	48
Norway (VG-lista)	8
Spain Airplay (Top 40 Radio)	40
Sweden (Sverigetopplistan)	1
Switzerland (Schweizer Hitparade)	15
UK Singles (Official Charts)	10
UK Airplay (Music Week)	21
UK Dance (Music Week)	15
UK Club Chart (Music Week)	27
US Dance Club Play (Billboard)	41

=== Year-end charts ===
Chart (1992)	Position
Israel (Israeli Singles Chart)	1
Sweden (Topplistan)	10
UK Singles (OCC)	91

Chart (1993)	Position
Australia (ARIA)	31
Europe (Eurochart Hot 100)	55
Germany (Media Control)	38
Sweden (Topplistan)	52

== Certifications ==
Region	Certification	Certified units/sales
Australia (ARIA)	Gold	35,000^{^}
Germany (BVMI)	Gold	250,000^{^}
Sweden (GLF)	Gold	25,000^{^}
^{^} Shipments figures based on certification alone.

== Release history ==
Region	Date	Format(s)	Label(s)	Ref.
United Kingdom	10 August 1992	7-inch vinyl; 12-inch vinyl; CD; cassette	London	
Australia	9 November 1992	CD; cassette	London; Polydor	
Japan	25 March 1993	Mini-CD	London	
