= List of Shooting Stars episodes =

This is a list of episodes for the BBC2 game show Shooting Stars hosted by Vic Reeves and Bob Mortimer.

The two teams are referred to as Team A and Team B, with the exception of the pilot episode (where they were referred to as the Starbirds and the Helicopters). Mark Lamarr was team A's captain for the first three series, after which Will Self took over. From the 2008 Anniversary Special, comedian Jack Dee became captain of team A.

Ulrika Jonsson has been team B's captain for the programme's entire run, with the exceptions of the pilot episode (in which Jonsson appeared as a guest) and a 2002 special, where Sara Cox assumed the captaincy due to illness, Jonsson did appear in a pre-recorded sketch used in the special.

In series 4 and 5 Johnny Vegas was a permanent panelist on team B, and Angelos Epithemiou (played by comedian Dan Skinner), appeared in the same capacity in series 6 before replacing George Dawes (played by Matt Lucas) as scorekeeper thereafter.

Contestants whose names are written in bold undertook the show's final challenge, unless otherwise stated.

== Episode list ==
As of 12 September 2011, 72 episodes of the show have been broadcast, not including the exclusive-to-video episode.

The coloured backgrounds denote the result of each of the shows:

– indicates Starbirds/Team A won.
– indicates Helicopters/Team B won.
– indicates the game ended in a draw

=== Pilot ===
Episode	First broadcast	Jonathan Ross' team	Danny Baker's team
Pilot	27 December 1993	Martin Clunes and Wendy Richard	Noddy Holder and Ulrika Jonsson

=== Series 1 ===
Episode	First broadcast	Mark's team	Ulrika's team
1x01	22 September 1995	Martine McCutcheon and Peter Stringfellow	Caryn Franklin and Rowland Rivron
1x02	29 September 1995	Jarvis Cocker and Carol Vorderman	Martin Clunes and Noah Huntley
1x03	6 October 1995	John Peel and Jonathan Ross	John Craven and Chris Evans
1x04	13 October 1995	Leslie Ash and Syd Little	Eddie Large and Bill Oddie
1x05	20 October 1995	Kathy Lloyd and Norman Pace	Gareth Hale and Patsy Palmer
1x06	27 October 1995	Caroline Aherne and Shane Richie	Danny Baker and Simon Bates
1x07	3 November 1995	Annabel Giles and Muriel Gray	David Baddiel and Paul Shane
1x08	10 November 1995	Samantha Janus and Richie Wermerling	Noddy Holder and Chris Rea
1x09	29 December 1995 (Note: Christmas Special)	Anna Friel and Clive Mantle	Neil Morrissey and Alvin Stardust

=== Series 2 ===
Episode	First broadcast	Mark's team	Ulrika's team	Final Challenge
2x01	27 September 1996	Samantha Beckinsale and Tommy Cannon	Bobby Ball and **Richard E. Grant**	Valley of the Plums
2x02	4 October 1996	Alice Beer and Robbie Williams	**Gordon Burns** and Dermot Morgan	The Wall of Dog
2x03	11 October 1996	Jo Brand and Carol Smillie	Russell Grant and Gary Rhodes	Windscreen Wipe-Off (Ulrika)
2x04	18 October 1996	Sara Cox and **Stephen Fry**	Eric Bristow and Wolf	Self-Propelled Tomato Gathering
2x05	25 October 1996	**Jo Guest** and Lynne Perrie	Philippa Forrester and Sarah Greene	Protect the Rennie
2x06	1 November 1996	Darcus Howe and Rose-Marie	Richard Whiteley and Gabrielle	The Mammalathon Challenge (Mark)
2x07	8 November 1996	Belinda Carlisle and Dennis Pennis	Tim Brooke-Taylor and Reg Presley	Tea Time and Tourniquets (Ulrika)
2x08	15 November 1996	Sonya Aurora Madan and Tamara Beckwith	Gareth Jones and **Richard Wilson**	Egg Skiing on the Hollywood Walk of Fame
2x09	22 November 1996	Anneka Rice and Dave Lee Travis	**Ardal O'Hanlon** and Carol Vorderman	The Gift of the Karate Chop
2x10	29 November 1996	Donna Air and **Griff Rhys Jones**	Morwenna Banks and Stephen Tompkinson	The Stairway to Heaven
2x11	6 December 1996	Vanessa Feltz and **Mark Williams**	Fred Talbot and Louise Wener	Locker Room Layabout
2x12	13 December 1996	Eric Hall and **Dervla Kirwan**	Zoe Ball and Roy Walker	The Pied Pipe-a-thon
2x13	20 December 1996	**Clare Grogan** and Sarah White	Frank Bough and John Thomson	Fruit Defence
2x14	27 December 1996	Ewen Bremner and Emma Forbes	**Jarvis Cocker** and Ian Kelsey	Feed Finnigan's Face

=== Unviewed and Nude ===
Mark's team	Ulrika's team	Final Challenge
Julia Carling and Robbie Williams	**Martin Clunes and Les Dennis**	Journey to Fowl Mountain (Note: Episode released exclusive-to-video.)

=== Series 3 ===
Episode	First broadcast	Mark's team	Ulrika's team	Final Challenge
3x01	26 September 1997	**Tania Bryer** and Leo Sayer	Mariella Frostrup and Antony Worrall Thompson	Makeup Shake-Up
3x02	3 October 1997	Daniela Denby-Ashe and **Janet Street-Porter**	Rolf Harris and Tony Mortimer	Industrial Incident
3x03	10 October 1997	Glenn Hugill and Carol Vorderman	Eddie Izzard and **Melanie Sykes**	Trichotomy Challenge
3x04	17 October 1997	Sid Owen and Tara Palmer-Tomkinson	**Stephen Fry** and Kate Robbins	Gather a Pre-Hibernatory Mixed Grill
3x05	24 October 1997	Robbie Coltrane and Denise van Outen	**Sue Cook** and David Hamilton	Naughty Boy
3x06	31 October 1997	Adam Ant and Melinda Messenger	Fern Britton and Wayne Hemingway	Onion Family Values (Ulrika)
3x07	7 November 1997	Mark Homer and **Lisa Stansfield**	David Emanuel and Judith Hann	The Gift of Celery
3x08	22 December 1997	Melvyn Hayes and Louise Nurding	Lorraine Kelly and Mark Owen	Time Drop (Mark)

=== Series 4 ===
Episode	First broadcast	Will's team	Ulrika and Johnny's team	Final Challenge
4x01	13 January 2002	Simon Day and Jordan	Goldie	The Gift of Hoovers (Johnny)
4x02	20 January 2002	Gail Hipgrave and **Paul Whitehouse**	Larry Hagman	Tending Bar for the King of Habsburg
4x03	27 January 2002	Keith Duffy and Jasmine Lowson	**Paul Daniels**	Wake Ken Tussle-McFactor with Confection
4x04	3 February 2002	Bradley Walsh and **Debbie McGee**	David Dickinson	Escape from Stalag 99
4x05	10 February 2002	Hugh Fearnley-Whittingstall and Nell McAndrew	**Michael Winner**	Identify the Dirty Boys
4x06	17 February 2002	**Nicky Clarke** and Tania Strecker	Quentin Willson	Deep South Dinner Time
4x07	24 February 2002	**Craig Cash** and Lisa Rogers	Chris Greener	Absorb the Power of Poultry
4x08	3 March 2002	Geoff Capes and Patsy Kensit	**Damon Hill**	Voyage on the Sea of Mushrooms

=== Series 5 ===
Episode	First broadcast	Will's team	Ulrika and Johnny's team	Final Challenge
5x01	6 October 2002 (Note: Premiere special)	Liz Smith and Lisa Snowdon	Sara Cox (Note: Ulrika Jonsson was not available to attend the recording.) Neil Hamilton	
5x02	13 October 2002	Amanda Donohoe and Jeremy Edwards	**Curtis Stigers**	Percy the Pelican's House
5x03	20 October 2002	Cat Deeley and Magnus Magnusson	Vernon Kay	The Turtle's Tale (Johnny)
5x04	27 October 2002	Clement Freud and **Myleene Klass**	Claire Goose	Justin the Monkey's House
5x05	3 November 2002	**Lucy Benjamin** and Jessica Taylor	Jo Whiley	The Stingray Shuffle
5x06	10 November 2002	Eddy Grant and **Victoria Silvstedt**	Sabrina Washington	The Hippo's House
5x07	17 November 2002	Tess Daly and Stuart Hall	**Nick Moran**	Eyes on the Glossaries
5x08	24 November 2002	**Zoe Ball** and Valerie Singleton	Norman Cook	The Elephant Challenge
5x09	1 December 2002	Alex Sibley and **Penny Smith**	Les Dennis	Arise, Sir Pigeon
5x10	8 December 2002	Mo Mowlam and Miranda Richardson	**Dr. Chris Steele**	Mr. Walrus Saves the Sea Turtles
5x11	15 December 2002	Lisa Barbuscia and Frankie Fraser	Barry McGuigan	The Elephant Challenge (Ulrika)
5x12	22 December 2002	Robin Gibb and **Anthea Turner**	Hugh Laurie	Geoffrey the Bull's House

=== Anniversary Specials ===
Episode	First broadcast	Title (Details)		
Sp.x01	30 December 2008	**The Inside Story**; A nominally 'behind the scenes' special which included clips from the previous series, interviews with previous guests and also appearances by Vic and Bob characters from their non-Shooting Stars series.		
Sp.x02	30 December 2008	Jack's team	Ulrika's team	Final Challenge
Sp.x02	30 December 2008	Kate Garraway and Dizzee Rascal	Peter Jones and Christine Walkden	Feel the Force of Opera (Jack)

=== Series 6 ===
Episode	First broadcast	Jack's team	Ulrika and Angelos' team	Final Challenge
6x01	26 August 2009	**Christine Bleakley** and DJ Ironik	Paddy McGuinness	Travel Master 9000
6x02	2 September 2009	Liz McClarnon and Ricky Wilson	**Gregg Wallace**	CSI Wallop Wallop Wallop
6x03	9 September 2009	Julia Bradbury and Martin Freeman	**Paddy Considine**	Lord Lloyd Cobbler
6x04	16 September 2009	Lee Mack and Kim Woodburn	**Dave Myers**	Identify the Stinky-Fingered Mutants
6x05	23 September 2009	**Mutya Buena** and Lenny Henry	Laurence Llewelyn-Bowen	Whose Face is it Anyway?
6x06	30 September 2009	Noel Fielding and Zöe Salmon	Tony Blackburn	Frankenstein's Melody (Angelos)

=== Series 7 ===
Episode	First broadcast	Jack's team	Ulrika's team	Final Challenge
7x01	13 July 2010	Linda Henry and Example	Camilla Dallerup and **Simon King**	Naughty Boy
7x02	20 July 2010	Trisha Goddard and **Kimberly Wyatt**	David Gest and Ben Miller	Whose Face is it Anyway?
7x03	27 July 2010	Tulisa Contostavlos and John Simpson	**Brendan Cole** and Chris Kamara	Face Picnic
7x04	3 August 2010	Cheryl Fergison and Dominic Littlewood	Jean Christophe Novelli and Luke Pasqualino	Face Pain (Jack)
7x05	10 August 2010	**Alex Reid** and Penny Smith	Mathew Horne and Tim Lovejoy	Shed Wars
7x06	17 August 2010	Paloma Faith and Louie Spence	James Buckley and **James May**	Tramp-o-leaner
7x07	30 December 2010	Thandiwe Newton and **Ronnie Wood**	Joanna Page and **Ricky Tomlinson**	Shopmobility Scooter Race (Note: The episode ended with a tie, so the Final Challenge was played as a tie-breaker.)

=== Series 8 ===
Episode	First broadcast	Jack's team	Ulrika's team	Final Challenge
8x01	8 August 2011	Graeme Hawley and Brigitte Nielsen	**James Martin** and Ross Noble	Bombs Away
8x02	15 August 2011	Tess Daly and Chris Packham	Mark Benton and Alexa Chung	
8x03	22 August 2011	Gabby Logan and **Jake Wood**	James Anderson and Matt Berry (Note: Berry spent the episode in character, as Vangelis.)	The Cube
8x04	29 August 2011	John Humphrys and Lisa Snowdon	Scott Mills and Peter Serafinowicz (Note: Serafinowicz spent the episode as his sketch show character, Brian Butterfield.)	
8x05	5 September 2011	Ronni Ancona and Sam Faiers	Ashley Banjo and **Chris Tarrant**	Crouching Tramp, Hidden Pound
8x06	12 September 2011	**Tamzin Outhwaite** and Mani	Micky Flanagan and Charlie Higson	Whose Face is it Anyway?

== Scores ==
Mark	Will	Jack	Ulrika
**Series wins** (3 drawn)
1			4
0	0	1	4
**Episode wins** (1 drawn)
34			36
15	9	10	36
