= To France =

1984 single by Mike Oldfield

Single by Mike Oldfield

from the album Discovery
- B-side: "In the Pool"; "Bones"
- Released: 18 June 1984
- Recorded: "In the Swiss Alps at 2,000 metres within sight of Lake Geneva on sunny days"
- Genre: Progressive pop, rock
- Length: 4:33
- Label: Virgin
- Songwriter: Mike Oldfield
- Producers: Mike Oldfield; Simon Phillips

Mike Oldfield singles chronology
"Crime of Passion" (1984)	"To France" (1984)	"Tricks of the Light" (1984)

"To France" is a single by musician Mike Oldfield, released in 1984. It is from the album Discovery and features Maggie Reilly on vocals.

The musical theme used in "To France" was also used on the first track on side two of the Discovery album, "Talk About Your Life". The B-sides for the single are the non-album tracks "In the Pool" and "Bones". The B-sides later re-appeared on the re-issue of the "Moonlight Shadow" single in 1993.

The music video that appears on the Elements – The Best of Mike Oldfield video for "To France" is a mock-live performance of the song. Oldfield plays a Fender Stratocaster in the video.

== Track listing ==
7" Single

1. "To France" (4.33)
2. "In the Pool" (3.40)

12" Single

1. "To France" (extended version) (5:32)
2. "In the Pool" (3:40)
3. "Bones" (3:19)

== Charts ==
The song reached the top 10 in a number of countries in 1984.

=== Weekly charts ===
Chart (1984)	Peak position
Austria (Ö3 Austria Top 40)	9
Canada Adult Contemporary (RPM)	19
Belgium (Ultratop 50 Flanders)	2
Europe (European Hot 100 Singles)	7
European Airplay (Music & Media)	6
France (SNEP)	23
Netherlands (Dutch Top 40)	3
Netherlands (Single Top 100)	4
Switzerland (Schweizer Hitparade)	7
UK Singles (Official Charts)	48
West Germany (GfK)	6

=== Year-end charts ===
Chart (1984)	Position
Belgium (Ultratop Flanders)	32
Netherlands (Dutch Top 40)	37
Netherlands (Single Top 100)	52
West Germany (Official German Charts)	37

== Maggie Reilly version ==
"To France"

Single by Maggie Reilly

from the album Elena
- Released: January 1997
- Recorded: 1996
- Genre: Folk pop
- Length: 5:09
- Label: EMI
- Songwriter: Mike Oldfield
- Producer: Nick Patrick

Maggie Reilly singles chronology
"Walk on By (The Mixes)" (1996)	"To France" (1997)	"Listen to Your Heart (The Mixes)" (1997)

In 1996, Maggie Reilly re-recorded "To France" on her solo album Elena, and in 2009 she recorded another version of the song for her album Looking Back Moving Forward. Compared to the original, this version is significantly Pop-heavy.

=== Track listing ===
Maxi-CD

1. "To France" (JPO & Beam Video Mix) 3:46
2. "To France" (Intro) 1:08
3. "To France" (JPO & Beam Spanish Dream Mix) 5:50
4. "To France" (JPO & Beam Club Mix) 8:03
5. ""To France" (Espirito Remix) 6:40
6. "Mike Oldfield & Maggie Reilly - "To France" (Radio Edit) 3:34

Part II - CD-Maxi

1. "To France" (DJ Beam's Radio Mix) 3:54
2. "To France" (De Donatis Remix) 6:16
3. "To France" (DJ Beam's Club Mix) 6:29

=== Charts ===
Chart (1997)	Peak position
Austria (Ö3 Austria Top 40)	17
Germany (GfK)	19
Netherlands (Dutch Top 40)	30
Netherlands (Single Top 100)	53
Switzerland (Schweizer Hitparade)	22

== Kim Wilde version ==
"To France"

Single by Kim Wilde

from the album Snapshots
- Released: 2 December 2011
- Recorded: 2011
- Genre: Pop rock
- Length: 3:59
- Label: Columbia SevenOne
- Songwriter: Mike Oldfield
- Producers: Andrew Murray; Ricky Wilde

Kim Wilde singles chronology
"It's Alright" / "Sleeping Satellite" (2011)	"To France" (2011)	"Ever Fallen in Love" (2012)

"To France" is the second single to be released from Kim Wilde's twelfth studio album Snapshots. It was released digitally on 2 December 2011. Included on the single is a Christmas remix of the song as well as an exclusive remix of "It's Alright" by German Euro-dance band Groove Coverage.

=== Track listing ===
1. "To France" (Christmas edit) – 3:56
2. "To France" – 3:59
3. "It's Alright" (Groove Coverage remix edit) – 2:55
4. "It's Alright" (Groove Coverage remix) – 4:26

== Other cover versions ==
- In 1996, Blind Guardian released a cover of "To France" in their compilation album The Forgotten Tales.
- In 1997, Marina Kapuro recorded a Russian version, called "Маленький остров" ("Little island").
- In 2001, Natalya Myrna recorded a Ukrainian version, called "Не вертатись в Ісландію" ("Don't go back to Iceland").
- In 2002, Novaspace released a cover of "To France" as a single.
- In 2011, Leaves' Eyes released a cover of "To France" on their album Meredead.
