= Come Out and Play (Kim Wilde album) =

Studio album by Kim Wilde
- Released: 27 August 2010
- Recorded: 2009–2010
- Genre: Pop rock
- Length: 42:58
- Label: Columbia SevenOne, Sony Music Germany
- Producer: Henrik Guemoes

Kim Wilde chronology
Never Say Never (2006)	Come Out and Play (2010)	Snapshots (2011)

Singles from Come Out and Play
- 1. "Lights Down Low" Released: 13 August 2010; 2. "Real Life" Released: 19 November 2010

Come Out and Play is the 11th studio album by British singer Kim Wilde. It was released on 27 August 2010 in Europe and is her first album with Sony Music Germany on the label Columbia SevenOne Music. The track "Lights Down Low" was released as the album's lead-single, reaching Number 34 in Germany. It included a previously unreleased song called "Snakes & Ladders". A second single called "Real Life" was released in November 2010. The album was a notable success in Germany, where it reached no. 10 on the album chart, and according to Nilsen Soundscan, was the most advertised album in the country that year.

A digital deluxe edition of the album was released in France on 7 March 2011 and includes two brand new songs as well as the "Lights Down Low" B-side. It has sold more than 80.000 Copies in Europe.

== Track listing ==
No.	Title	Writer(s)	Length
1.	"King of the World"	Kim Wilde, Fredrik Thomander, Anders Wikström	3:31
2.	"Lights Down Low"	Anthony Galatis, Mark Frisch	3:00
3.	"Real Life"	Alexander Geringas, Erik Nyholm, Dimitri Ehrlich	3:54
4.	"Greatest Journey" (with Glenn Gregory)	Kim Wilde, Ricky Wilde	3:48
5.	"I Want What I Want"	Kim Wilde, Robert Habolim	3:06
6.	"Love Conquers All" (featuring Nik Kershaw)	Kim Wilde, Rob Davis	3:58
7.	"Hey You!"	Kim Wilde, Thomander, Wikström	3:12
8.	"Suicide"	Kim Wilde, Andrew Murray, Stephen Jones, Neil Jones	2:41
9.	"This Paranoia"	Kim Wilde, Ricky Wilde, Thomander, Wikström	2:48
10.	"Loving You More"	Ricky Wilde, Steve Hart	4:01
11.	"Get Out"	Pete Kirtley, Nyholm, Sacha Collisson	3:45
12.	"My Wish Is Your Command"	Ricky Wilde, Scarlett Wilde	3:33
13.	"Jessica"	Kim Wilde	1:21

Digital download bonus tracks
No.	Title	Writer(s)	Length
14.	"Carry Me Home"	Kim Wilde, Thomander, Wikström	4:03
15.	"Lights Down Low" (Music video)		3:01

French deluxe edition bonus tracks
No.	Title	Writer(s)	Length
14.	"Carry Me Home"	Kim Wilde, Thomander, Wikström	4:03
15.	"Addicted to You"	Ricky Wilde, Roxanne Wilde, Sean Vincent	3:35
16.	"Party on the Brink"	Hayley Bonnick, Nick Beggs	3:33
17.	"Snakes & Ladders"	Kim Wilde, Thomander, Wikström	3:21

== Charts ==
Chart (2010)	Peak position
Austrian Albums (Ö3 Austria)	24
French Albums (SNEP)	156
German Albums (Offizielle Top 100)	10
Greek International Albums (IFPI)	21
Swiss Albums (Schweizer Hitparade)	9
