= I'm Alright =

I'm Alright may refer to:

- I'm Alright (Loudon Wainwright III album), 1985
- I'm Alright (Jo Dee Messina album), 1998
  - "I'm Alright" (Jo Dee Messina song), this album's title track
- "I'm Alright" (Kenny Loggins song), from the Caddyshack soundtrack, 1980
- I'm Alright (Lynn Anderson album), 1970
  - ""I'm Alright" (Lynn Anderson song), a song by Lynn Anderson from the album of the same name
- "I'm Alright", a song by Childish Gambino from the mixtape Culdesac
- "I'm Alright", a song by Jars of Clay from their album If I Left the Zoo
- "I'm Alright", a song by Luna Halo from their self-titled album
- "I'm Alright", a song by the band Stereophonics from the album You Gotta Go There to Come Back
- "I'm Alright", a song by Simon Townshend from the album Animal Soup
- "I'm Alright", a song by Shania Twain from the album Now
- "I'm Alright", a song by Sugababes from The Lost Tapes
- "I'm All Right", a 2006 song by Madeleine Peyroux from the album Half the Perfect World
- "I'm All Right" (Bo Diddley song), on his 1963 album Bo Diddley's Beach Party, covered by The Rolling Stones as "I'm Alright" on their EP Got Live If You Want It!

== Others ==
- I'm Alright Jack & the Beanstalk, the alternate title for Not of This Earth, an album by The Damned
- I'm All Right Jack, a 1959 British comedy film
- "I'm All Right Jack", a song by the Tom Robinson Band on the 1978 album Power in the Darkness

== See also ==
- It's Alright (disambiguation)
