= Shooting Stars (British TV series) =

British television comedy panel game (1993–2011)

- Genre: Surreal comedy, Slapstick comedy, British comedy
- Created by: Vic Reeves; Bob Mortimer
- Presented by: Vic Reeves; Bob Mortimer
- Starring: Team captains; Jonathan Ross (1993 pilot); Danny Baker (1993 pilot); Mark Lamarr (1995–1997); Ulrika Jonsson (1995–2011); Sara Cox (2002 special); Will Self (2002); Jack Dee (2008–2011) Regular panellists; Johnny Vegas (2002); Angelos Epithemiou (Dan Renton Skinner) (2009) Scorekeepers; George Dawes (Matt Lucas) (1995–2009); Angelos Epithemiou (Dan Renton Skinner) (2010–2011)
- Voices of: Graham Skidmore (1993–2002); Nico Tatarowicz (2008–2011)
- Country of origin: United Kingdom
- Original language: English
- No. of series: 8
- No. of episodes: 72 (list of episodes)

Production
- Producers: Alan Marke (1995–1997); Lisa Clark (2002–2011)
- Running time: 30 minutes

Original release
- Network: BBC Two
- Release: 27 December 1993 – 22 December 1997
- Network: BBC Choice
- Release: 13 January – 22 December 2002
- Network: BBC Two
- Release: 30 December 2008 – 12 September 2011

Shooting Stars is a British television comedy panel game broadcast on BBC Two as a pilot in 1993, then as three full series from 1995 to 1997, then on BBC Choice from January to December 2002 with two series before returning to BBC Two for another three series from 2008 until its cancellation in 2011. Created and hosted by double-act Vic Reeves and Bob Mortimer, it uses the panel show format but with the comedians' often slapstick, surreal and anarchic humour that does not rely on rules in order to function, with the pair apparently ignoring existing rules or inventing new ones as and when the mood takes them.

== Format ==
The basic format of the show is that of a conventional panel game. Hosts Vic Reeves and Bob Mortimer ask questions of the two teams with points awarded for "correct" answers; however, scoring is largely arbitrary. Each episode is produced by editing together excerpts of a longer session. Rounds include "true or false", the film clip round, the impressions round, and "The Dove from Above". In the impressions round, contestants have to guess what song Reeves is singing (incomprehensibly) in the style of an incoherent nightclub singer.

=== The Dove From Above ===
"The Dove from Above" is a large cardboard prop animal suspended above the contestants merely for the purpose of bearing six key words for further questions. Guests would be prompted to "coo" down the dove. Alternatives to the dove in various series included "The Blue Suitcase" in the pilot, "The Crow from Below", "The Vest from the West", Matt Lucas as "George Dawes from the Upper Floors," "The Wonderful, Wonderful Car", "Donald Cox – The Sweaty Fox," "The Fly from Upon High" and "The Beast from the East."

In the "Dove from Above" round and subsequent versions of the round, if a contestant answers incorrectly, Vic says "UVAVU" /uːˈvɑːvuː/ and pulls a silly face. If the contestant chooses a certain, prize-winning option, he pulls another face and says "ERANU" /ɪəˈrɑːnuː/. The prize is invariably a bizarre and practically useless device.

Occasionally, there would be a "Maverick Round" where a guest would have to stand centre stage and represent something "via the medium of dance", or "the gift of the air guitar". They would then be judged by scorekeeper George Dawes (Lucas), who would invariably award them no points.

Reeves would often tell a joke, much to everyone's disappointment. The joke would always fall flat, often accompanied by tumbleweed blowing across the floor of the studio. Occasionally, someone else would tell the joke and would be met with uproarious laughter, much to Reeves' anger.

=== Impressions round ===
The impressions round saw a "random light" pick a contestant at random, and then they had to do an impression of a celebrity. In the pilot this was called by Reeves, "random factor". Other elements of the impressions round included the aforementioned club style singing. George Dawes played the drums while Reeves did this.

=== Film clip round ===
The film clip round always included a clip that was related to the question, but the answer to the question was never shown in the film just like the lyrics of George Dawes' songs, despite Bob Mortimer as a running gag saying to watch or listen carefully. In one episode, Mark Lamarr's team were shown a clip from Citizen Smith (instead of a comedy clip created by the Shooting Stars team), and were totally unaware the question would relate directly to the clip. A serious question was asked requesting what a man's T-shirt read, only for Mark to make something up and then Vic saying his traditional "UVAVU!" wrong answer catchphrase. One of the most memorable film clips was a spoof of The Naked Chef, with Matt Lucas playing the part of Jamie Oliver, and Ulrika Jonsson playing the part of his then wife-to-be Juliette Norton. In the sketch, Lucas plays on highlighting Jamie's then constant use of the word pukka, constantly using the word while making sandwiches for a party in which he has invited his friends along (which he often used to do on his show, including the Sainsbury's adverts). He keeps saying that he'll use something later which he has discarded such as an eggshell, while Juliette twice appears asking if he would like any help, only to be turned away. At the end of the film clip, he throws a lot of chips in his motorcycle crash helmet.

=== Final round ===
Whichever teams "wins" the round according to the scoring system "wins" £1 per point, and the captain must nominate a teammate to do a silly stunt for an alleged £5 per point. This is a timed round, often marked by Vic or Bob stating, "We don't know how much time we have, but when the time is up, you'll hear this sound," prompting George to say a silly phrase such as "Come on, come on! Clear it up, woman!" The credits then roll after this round as Vic and Bob sing their goodbyes.

=== Humour ===
The title of the show is a pun on the fact that much of the humour is at the expense of the guest stars. To prove this point, in the pilot episode at the opening song (singing "let's start Shooting Stars"), Vic and Bob are holding shotguns and fire these into the stars.

== Participants ==
There are two teams – Team A and Team B. Each team has a regular team captain – originally Mark Lamarr and Ulrika Jonsson – and two celebrity guests on each team. Lamarr left the series in 1997 as he disliked being in too many quiz shows at once (at the time he was hosting Never Mind the Buzzcocks), and was replaced by novelist Will Self when the series returned in 2002. At the same time comedian Johnny Vegas was brought in as a regular guest on Jonsson's team, where he had a pint of Guinness on his desk where all the other contestants had water. Self was replaced by Jack Dee for the 2008 15th Anniversary Special and for the 2009 series, which also saw Lucas' character, George Dawes, replaced by Angelos Epithemiou, a creation of comedian Dan Renton Skinner. Contestants are often addressed by their surnames, in reference to University Challenge.

In addition to the 'regulars', the panel consisted of other celebrities from music, sports, politics and other fields. Some of the most memorable episodes included members who were clearly unaware of the format; on one particularly famous episode, Dallas star Larry Hagman appeared on the show and was in a state of constant bemusement. Writing in The Guardian, Nancy Banks-Smith described him as looking "like a man in a nightmare".

Until the 2010 series, the "score" was kept by George Dawes, an overgrown, ranting, drumming baby played by comedian Matt Lucas (occasionally, George's mother Marjorie – also played by Lucas – appears instead. She also appears in Little Britain). His arrival at the start of the show would be accompanied by the words, "He's a baby!" sung to the tune of Led Zeppelin's "Black Dog". He would also provide a sound effect to signal the end of timed rounds: in earlier series this was a simple scream, but later became random phrases ("Leakage"), sometimes in regional accents ("That's it; I'm turning the car around and we're going back to Dorset!"), or advertising slogans ("Have you ever been to a Harvester before?"). In the later series he would also perform "George's Song," on which subject questions would follow. These included "Lesbians", "Everybody's Talkin' About Football", "Hip Hop Is The Best", "1942" (appeared in the 15-year special, while being a song about inventions such as floors, trees, shoes and the 'flu) and even a rendition of the Rentaghost theme song. One of the most famous songs is "Peanuts", with George shouting "Peanuts!" every so often to a backing track, while corpsing. The costume Lucas wore for this performance later became an inspiration for his Little Britain character Andy. Another notable song was "Thank You Baked Potato", in which a potato gave him helpful advice. Lucas later used a revised version of this song in a fundraising effort for the National Health Service, during the 2020 COVID-19 pandemic.

Lucas quit the programme in the 2010 series due to scheduling conflicts with his other projects, and the role of scorekeeper was taken over by Epithemiou.

== Most appearances ==
Apart from the Team Captains, Johnny Vegas made the most appearances with 19 as he was a permanent panellist on Ulrika's team during the 2002 series. Carol Vorderman made a total of 3 appearances and Jarvis Cocker, Stephen Fry, Zoe Ball, Les Dennis and Sara Cox each made two appearances (although Fry made a short appearance in the 2002 Christmas special). Martin Clunes and Robbie Williams both made two appearances as a panellist, once on Series One and once on video exclusive Unviewed and Nude, Clunes was also featured as a "mystery celebrity" in series two.

== Merchandise ==
- In November 1996 the first Shooting Stars VHS was released entitled Shooting Stars - Unviewed and Nude.
- 1996 saw the release of the Shooting Stars book and CD game. Published by BBC Books in hard cover, this 120-page book retailed at £9.99, and featured various rounds from the shows, as well as a 45-minute CD of the Club Singer round, allowing you to play a full game of Shooting Stars in your own home.
- In November 1997 the second Shooting Stars VHS was released entitled "Unpicked And Plucked".
- In March 1999 both the first and second Shooting Stars VHS was released as a double VHS. It was called Shooting Stars - Unviewed And Nude & Unpicked And Plucked.
- In November 2009, the first Shooting Stars DVD was released, containing the complete series 6. The complete seventh series was released on DVD the following year.

== Relaunch ==
An anniversary edition entitled All New Shooting Stars was shown on 30 December 2008, celebrating the 15th anniversary of the show. Ulrika Jonsson returned as captain, with Jack Dee as the replacement team captain. Matt Lucas also reprised his George Dawes character for the episode. Guests for the episode were Peter Jones, Kate Garraway, Christine Walkden, and Dizzee Rascal.

On 3 April 2009, it was announced that the show would return for a full sixth series. Most of the original cast returned along with Jack Dee, who continued as a permanent team captain after his appearance on the anniversary special. It began on BBC Two and BBC HD on 26 August 2009.

The relaunched series altered the format in a number of ways:

- There are now only three rounds; a general round, the Dove from Above round, and the quick-fire round. The first general round usually contains "true or false" questions, but contains other questions as well, including a regular "Who is Hitler" question in which the contestants must identify which celebrity has been disguised as Adolf Hitler.
- The Dove from Above has only four categories, meaning that all are exhausted in every show. The rules for "Eranu" and "Uvavu" are still read out (usually with the final -u extended into a reference or comedy phrase), but these phrases are not actually used during the round, and no "hidden special prizes" are ever awarded in spite of Vic saying that they exist and every category of the Dove being used in every show. The phrases, and the references to a special prize, are finally dropped entirely in the last two episodes.
- The four categories of the Dove always correspond to classic theme skits: one is always "George's Song", another is always "a song in the club style", and another is always either a spoof video clip or a performance by the "Hartlepool Film Re-enactment Society" in which Vic and Bob use a wendy house and dolls on the end of sticks to play out a skit featuring characters from a well-known film.
- Other regular skits integrated into the show include a conversation with kebab van owner "Angelos Epithemiou" (actually comedian Renton Skinner), and an attempt to "cheer up Jack Dee" by playing him a song using drain pipes.
- The prize awarded for the final game, rather than being surreal, is instead laughably small: examples include "a cassette of Reggae", "a can of tropical drink", and "this wonderful toothpick holder". There was also an occasion where a video of an exotic destination was shown on a screen only for the prize to be able to see the remainder of that video.

Shooting Stars returned in July 2010 for a seventh series. This series made the following further changes:

- Following Matt Lucas's decision to leave the programme, Angelos Epithemiou became the scorekeeper. His entrance music is Shaggy's "Boombastic"; rather than George Dawes' drum kit, he keeps the scores from behind his "Dream Machine", a combination of a DJ station and a pound shop. It still includes a miniature electronic drum kit which he uses to accompany Vic's "songs in the club style". Angelos always plays a short burst of music (an excerpt from "Drop The Pressure (Jack Beats 'Rinsed Out Rave' Remix)" by Project Bassline) before announcing the first round's scores, and brings in a plastic bag, the contents of which are revealed between rounds during the show.
- There are now four rounds: the opening general round, the "clip round" (which has only one question, opened to both teams, on the presented clip), the Dove from Above and the quick-fire round. The video clips (and the "Hartlepool re-enactments") are removed from the Dove round and replaced by "celebrity questions", in which a question is asked in a video clip by Vic or Bob while dressed up as another celebrity.
- "George's Song" - as one of the options on the Dove - is replaced by "Angelos Epithemou's Variety Showcase" in which Angelos performs a short skit, often involving dancing or a parody of a magic show. Spoof magic tricks appear frequently elsewhere in this series, including a regular routine with a magic box at the beginning of each show (although many of the tricks are obviously done by camera cuts or editing).
- Ulrika is introduced by the singing of a spoof song to the melody of "Agadoo".
- In at least one round, an unoccupied pair of trousers will "walk" unattended across the studio. This is completely ignored by everyone else. In one episode, this is replaced by a taxidermy Great Dane which quietly drifts up behind one of the contestants' podiums.
- Shooting Stars returned for an eighth series on 8 August 2011. It now featured Archie Andrews, a puppet who walks and "hands" the question to the contestant on the left of Ulrika.
- It was announced by Bob Mortimer on 15 November 2011 that the BBC had cancelled further series of the show. The BBC have confirmed that the show has been axed.

== Transmissions ==
=== Original series ===
Series	Start date	End date	Episodes
Pilot	27 December 1993		1
1	22 September 1995	10 November 1995	8
2	27 September 1996	20 December 1996	13
3	26 September 1997	7 November 1997	7
4	13 January 2002	3 March 2002	8
5	13 October 2002	15 December 2002	10
6	26 August 2009	30 September 2009	6
7	13 July 2010	17 August 2010	6
8	8 August 2011	12 September 2011	6

=== Specials ===
Date	Entitle
29 December 1995	Christmas Special
27 December 1996	Christmas Special
22 December 1997	Christmas Special
6 October 2002	Premiere Special
22 December 2002	Christmas Special
30 December 2008	Anniversary Special
30 December 2010	Christmas Special

== International versions ==
Country	Name	Host	Channel	Premiere	Finale
Denmark	Shooting Stars	Frank Hvam and Casper Christensen	TV2 Zulu	2004	
Israel	פפראצי; Paparazzi	Erez Ben Harush and Michael Hanegbi	yes	2006	2007
