= Kaycee Grogan =

American singer

Kayce Denise Grogan-Wallace
- Born: August 19, 1980 (age 46); Marietta, Georgia, United States
- Other name: Kaycee
- Education: Kennesaw State University
- Musical career
- Genres: R&B; soul; new jack swing
- Occupations: Singer; songwriter
- Labels: Columbia; Sony

Kaycee Grogan is an R&B singer who was signed to Columbia Records in the 1990s. Heralded at 13 as a "major talent in development" in a 1994 Billboard article, her debut single "It's Alright" was later released in 1996 and charted on the Billboard Hot 100 chart. In 1997, her debut album What Girls Are Made Of was released to the Japanese market alongside the release of a second single "So In Love," but the albums' North American release was shelved.

Grogan later attended Kennesaw State University to study music education, theater, and dance, before appearing in numerous Atlanta-area touring dramatic/musical productions: Dreamgirls, Once on This Island, 42nd Street, and The Color Purple.
