= It's OK =

It's OK or It's Okay may refer to:

- It's OK! (band), American band
- "It's OK!" (Atomic Kitten song)
- "It's O.K." (The Beach Boys song)
- "It's OK" (CeeLo Green song)
- "It's OK" (Delirious? song)
- "It's Okay" (Des'ree song)
- "It's Okay" (One Blood), a song by The Game
- "It's OK", a song by Alexander O'Neal from Saga of a Married Man
- "It's OK", a song by Alvin and the Chipmunks
- "It's OK", a song by Dead Moon
- "It's OK", a song by Eminem from Infinite
- "It's OK", a song by Imagine Dragons from Mercury – Act 1
- "It's OK", a 2020 song by Nightbirde
- "It's O.K.", a song by BeBe & CeCe Winans from the 1991 album Different Lifestyles
- "It's Okayyy", a 2018 song by Swizz Beatz
- "It's Okay", a 2025 song by Minnie
- "It's OK (It's Alright)", a song by Fine Young Cannibals from their 1989 album The Raw & the Cooked
