= It's Alright (Kaycee Grogan song) =

Single by Kaycee Grogan
- Released: 1996
- Genre: R&B
- Label: Columbia
- Songwriters: Darcy Aldridge, Carl Breeding, Robert Carter, Norman Giscombe, Benny Tillman

Music video
- "It's Alright" Video on YouTube

"It's Alright" is the debut single by Kaycee Grogan. It was the only single released from her debut album, first appearing on Billboard lists on December 14, 1996. The single peaked at number sixty-one on the Billboard Hot 100.

== Chart positions ==
Chart (1996)	Peak position
U.S. Billboard Hot 100	61
