= West End Girls =

1984 single by Pet Shop Boys

- 12-inch single cover

Single by Pet Shop Boys
- B-side: "Pet Shop Boys"
- Released: 9 April 1984
- Recorded: 1983
- Studio: Unique Recording (New York City)
- Genre: Synth-pop
- Length: 4:45
- Label: Bobcat
- Songwriters: Neil Tennant; Chris Lowe
- Producer: Bobby Orlando

Pet Shop Boys singles chronology
"West End Girls" (1984)	"One More Chance" (1984)

"West End Girls"
- 7-inch single cover

Single by Pet Shop Boys

from the album Please
- B-side: "A Man Could Get Arrested"
- Released: 28 October 1985
- Recorded: August 1985
- Studio: Advision (London)
- Genre: Synth-pop; dance-pop; disco; new wave
- Length: 4:41 (album version); 3:59 (7-inch version)
- Label: Parlophone
- Songwriters: Neil Tennant; Chris Lowe
- Producer: Stephen Hague

Pet Shop Boys singles chronology
"Opportunities (Let's Make Lots of Money) (first release)" (1985)	"West End Girls" (1985)	"Love Comes Quickly" (1986)

Music video
- "West End Girls" on YouTube

"West End Girls" is a song by the English synth-pop duo Pet Shop Boys. Written by Neil Tennant and Chris Lowe, the song was released twice as a single. The lyrics, concerned with class and the pressures of inner-city life in London, are inspired partly by T. S. Eliot's poem The Waste Land (1922). The track was generally well received by contemporary music critics and has been frequently cited as a highlight in the duo's career.

The first version of the song was produced by Bobby Orlando and was released on Columbia Records' Bobcat Records imprint in April 1984, becoming a club hit in the United States and some European countries. After the duo signed with EMI, the song was re-recorded with producer Stephen Hague for their first studio album, Please (1986). In October 1985, the new version was released, reaching number one in the United Kingdom and the United States in 1986.

In 1987, the song won Best Single at the Brit Awards and Best International Hit at the Ivor Novello Awards. In 2005, 20 years after its release, it was awarded Song of The Decade between 1985 and 1994 by the British Academy of Composers and Songwriters. A critic's poll in 2020 by The Guardian selected "West End Girls" as the greatest UK number-one single. Despite not being considered a hip-hop track, it is one of the very first songs heavily influenced by rap or spoken-word to top the charts on both the UK singles chart and the US Billboard Hot 100, though its classification as rap has been a source of controversy.

The song was performed by the Pet Shop Boys at the 2012 Summer Olympics closing ceremony.

== Background ==
=== Recording and production ===
==== Bobby O version ====
In 1983, Neil Tennant met producer Bobby Orlando, while on an assignment in New York interviewing Sting for Smash Hits. After listening to some demos, Orlando offered to produce for the duo.

In 1983 and 1984, the duo recorded twelve songs with Orlando at Unique Studios in New York, "West End Girls", "Opportunities (Let's Make Lots of Money)", "One More Chance", "I Want a Lover", "That's My Impression", "A Man Could Get Arrested", "I Get Excited", "Two Divided by Zero", "Rent", "It's a Sin", "Pet Shop Boys", and "Later Tonight". Orlando played most of the instruments on "West End Girls", including the jazz riff at the end. Lowe played one chord and the bassline. It included a drum part lifted from Michael Jackson's "Billie Jean", and an arrangement involving what Tennant called "Barry White chords". Orlando was thrilled by the song's production; his idea was to make a rap record in a British accent.

In April 1984, "West End Girls" was released, becoming a club hit in Los Angeles and San Francisco, and a minor dance hit in Belgium and France, but was only available in the United Kingdom as a 12-inch import. In March 1985, after long negotiations, Pet Shop Boys cut their contractual ties with Orlando, and hired manager Tom Watkins, who signed them with EMI.

==== Stephen Hague version ====
An entire week had been spent re-recording and rearranging "West End Girls" with producer Stephen Hague at Advision Studios, using Studio Two housed with an Otari 24-track tape machine and an SSL console.

The song, according to engineer David Jacob, was musically "constructed with only four basic rhythmical patterns throughout", with no 'real' instruments production-wise except for one cymbal. The rhythmic foundations were laid down with an Oberheim DMX drum machine. In addition to that, the synthesizer strings that run throughout the song were created using a blend of string sounds from an E-mu Emulator I and an Emulator II.

The bass part is a composite of different sounds from an Emulator II, a Yamaha DX7 and a Roland Jupiter-6, all of which were connected by MIDI. It had been played by hand to "lend more fluidity to the track", although initially there was a bit of difficulty in keeping the part in time with the drum machine.

The song features a cowbell-like sound, which is in fact a combination of a cowbell and an Emulator II choir sound recorded into a Roland MSQ-700 sequencer, and spun in manually at appropriate places in the song.

The trumpet solo in this version was played by Hague on the Emulator. According to Jacob, "it took about six hours to get the trumpet to sound genuine, purposely playing wrong notes to make it sound more 'jazz'".

The traffic noise which introduces the song was recorded by Hague using a Sony Professional Walkman on Gosfield Street outside Advision. By examining the original source tape, the sing-song voice heard at the beginning was discovered to be saying "Get on the mic-ro-ph-one" by a random WHAM! fan on the street.

In addition to the rap verses and choruses sung by Tennant (each using different microphones—one for verse and another for choruses), singer Helena Springs was brought in to sing background vocals—parts of these were sampled into the Emulator to be used wherever wanted in the track.

They re-released the song in late 1985, topping the charts in both the UK and the US.

=== Music and lyric ===
"West End Girls"
A 30-second sample from the 1985 version of "West End Girls", featuring Tennant rapping part of the first verse, and the chorus, which shows the song's focus on class with the lyrics "East End Boys and West End Girls".

"West End Girls" is a synth-pop song influenced by hip hop music. It has also been described as dance-pop, disco, and new wave. The song's socially conscious streak, as well as the propulsive bass line, derives from Grandmaster Flash's protest rap song "The Message". Lowe and Hague created a "snaky, obsessive rhythm punch" for the music, replacing the song's previously sparse beats and minimal keyboard lines.

Tennant started to write the song when he was staying at his cousin's house in Nottingham while watching a gangster film. Just when he was going to sleep he came up with the lines: "Sometimes you're better off dead, there's a gun in your hand and it's pointing at your head". The lyrics were inspired by T.S. Eliot's poem The Waste Land, particularly in the use of different narrative voices and arcane references. The song's lyrics are largely concerned with class and inner-city pressure. Tennant later said that some listeners had assumed the song referred to prostitutes, but was actually, "about rough boys getting a bit of posh".

Sound-wise, the 1985 version also features a considerably smoother arrangement than the 1984 version, trading out the collage of disjointed samples (such as glass breaking and Tennant shouting the word "I") in favour of soft synth pads and Hague's Emulator trumpet solo. At the same time, however, the 1985 version "starts off like a film noir", opening with ambient traffic sounds not heard in the 1984 version. In the liner notes to the 2001 reissue of Please, Tennant noted that this was born out of a desire for "filmic" music.

In 2022, Tennant changed the line "From Lake Geneva to the Finland Station" in the last verse to "From Mariupol to Kyiv Station" during their co-headline Unity Tour with New Order and at their Glastonbury festival Sunday night headline appearance. The change was done in solidarity for Ukraine which was invaded by Russia (also because Finland Station is located in Russia).

== Critical reception ==
"West End Girls" has been generally well received by music critics. Stephen Thomas Erlewine from AllMusic in a review of the album Please called the song "hypnotic", adding that "it's not only a classic dance single, it's a classic pop single". In a review for the group's second studio album Actually, Rob Hoerburger from Rolling Stone magazine commented that "West End Girls" was "as catchy as anything on the radio in 1986", praising "its enticing bass line and foreboding synth riffs", but felt that it was almost "nullified by peevish spoken asides and the cryptic posturing of the duo's lyrics". In a review of the live album Concrete, Michael Hubbard from musicOMH said that "West End Girls" was one of the songs that "round out a collection that never feels too long or superfluous", adding that it "goes some way to installing Tennant and Lowe as national treasures".

Cash Box called it "a sensational pop single". Billboard called it a "cannily haunting song" in which "disco meets sociology, rap and the Al Stewart catalogue".

Nitsuh Abebe from Pitchfork, in a review of their compilation album PopArt: The Hits commented that in the song "we meet Tennant not as a singer, but as a speaker", adding that "he mumbles the verses to us not like a star, but like a stranger in a raincoat, slinking alongside you and pointing out the sights".

In 1987, "West End Girls" won for Best Single at the Brit Awards, and for Best International Hit at the Ivor Novello Awards. In 2005, the British Academy of Composers and Songwriters gave to West End Girls the Ivor Novello Award for Song of The Decade between 1985 and 1994.

In 2015, the song was voted by the British public as the nation's 12th favourite 1980s number one in a poll for ITV. In 2020, The Guardian selected "West End Girls" as number one in a critics' poll of the 100 greatest UK number-one singles. It was ranked No. 433 on Rolling Stone's "Top 500 Greatest Songs of All Time" in 2021 and No. 65 on their "200 Greatest Dance Songs of All Time" in 2022.

== Music video ==
The accompanying music video for "West End Girls" was directed by Andy Morahan and Eric Watson, and consists of shots of the duo around London.

At the beginning of the video, noises from the city can be heard, a camera passes Lowe on the street, and focuses on mannequins in a shop window. Then appears a sequence of quick cuts with shots of the city's different sub-cultures; the video freezes and cuts to Tennant and Lowe, who walk through an empty Wentworth Street in Petticoat Lane Market. They stand in front of a red garage door; Tennant is in front dressed with a long coat, white shirt and dark necktie, directly addressing the camera, with Lowe standing behind him with a blank expression. Lowe is filmed in double-exposure and appears almost ghostlike. In other shots, Tennant power-walks imperiously while Lowe casually follows behind. While Tennant delivers the lyrics and chorus directly at the viewer, Lowe appears at times uninterested in the proceedings or preoccupied with other goings-on around them.

Then the video shows various shots at Waterloo Station, as the chorus starts. In slow motion, the camera pans across the WHSmith shop on the station concourse as the duo walk past. It cuts to a brief shot of a No. 42 red double-decker bus, showing the destination as Aldgate, also advertising the stage-show Evita, then black and white shots of the Tower Bridge, Westminster and the Westminster Palace Clock Tower from the sky. The duo poses on the South Bank of the River Thames in a pastiche of a postcard image, with the Houses of Parliament as a background.

The camera shows shots of young women, and passes through arcades and cinemas in Leicester Square. The camera now passes South Africa House showing protestors in the Non-Stop Picket, an anti-apartheid vigil. The video cuts to a closeup of Tennant singing the chorus, with a purple neon sign eerily passing across his face. At the end the camera passes again through Leicester Square, where people queue to see Fletch and Desperately Seeking Susan. The video was nominated for Best New Artist in a Video at the 1986 MTV Video Music Awards, but lost to A-ha's "Take On Me".

== Commercial performance ==
"West End Girls" was first released in April 1984 through writer and producer Bobby Orlando's label. The song was a club hit in the United States, and in some European countries, such as Belgium, where it debuted at number 24 on the VRT Top 30 chart on 28 July 1984, peaking at 17 four weeks later. In Canada, "West End Girls" first entered the RPM singles chart in April 1985, reaching a peak position of 81 in June 1985.

Having signed with EMI, the group released their first major label single "Opportunities (Let's Make Lots of Money)" in mid-1985, but it failed to attract attention. The Pet Shop Boys then decided to re-record "West End Girls", and issue this new version as a single. Producer Stephen Hague helmed the new, re-recorded version of "West End Girls".

The re-recorded version of "West End Girls" was released in the United Kingdom in October 1985, debuting on the UK Singles Chart at number 80, and within eight weeks of its release it had reached the top of the chart. It maintained the number one position for two weeks and received a platinum certification by the British Phonographic Industry (BPI) in May 2023. Across Europe, "West End Girls" also topped the singles chart in Norway, as well as peaking in the top ten in Australia, Belgium, West Germany, Ireland, the Netherlands, Sweden, and Switzerland.

In Canada, where the original recording of "West End Girls" had already been a minor hit in 1985, the re-recorded version was issued as a single in early 1986. The re-recorded song entered the chart in March 1986, peaking at number one for one week on 17 May 1986. In the United States, "West End Girls" debuted on the Billboard Hot 100 at number 71, reaching the number one position on 10 May 1986, and remained on the chart for 20 weeks. The song also peaked at number one on Billboard's Hot Dance Music/Club Play chart for two weeks.

"West End Girls" re-entered the charts in February 2021 as Pet Shop Boys received some exposure in early 2021 thanks to the premiere of the Channel 4 series It's a Sin, named after the song of the same name, and a popular Allstate Super Bowl ad featuring the song "Opportunities (Let's Make Lots of Money)". Consequently, several singles have re-entered the charts, with "Opportunities" having reached number one in February 2021 on Billboard's Dance/Electronic Digital Song Sales chart and spending three consecutive weeks atop the chart. "West End Girls" re-charted with the latter song, re-entering the charts for the week of 27 February 2021 at number nine on the Dance/Electronic Digital Song Sales chart, nearly having switched places in chart rankings with "Opportunities" from their 1986 entries. The song rose to number six on the chart for the week of 12 March 2021.

In May 2024 it was reported to have 70 million streams on music streaming services in the UK, making it the most streamed Pet Shop Boys song in the UK.

== Track listings ==
- 7-inch UK (1984 release)
1. "West End Girls" (Nouvelle version) – 4:10
2. "Pet Shop Boys" – 5:10
- 12-inch UK (1984 release)
1. "West End Girls" (extended mix) – 7:50
2. "Pet Shop Boys" – 5:10
- 7-inch Belgium (1984 release)
1. "West End Girls" (Nouvelle version) – 4:10
2. "Pet Shop Boys" – 5:10
- 7-inch West Germany (1984 release)
1. "West End Girls" (Nouvelle version edit) – 3:21
2. "Pet Shop Boys" (Edit) – 3:26
- 7-inch Canada (1984 release)
1. "West End Girls" (Original 7″ version) – 4:14
2. "West End Girls" (Original 7″ version) – 4:14

Note: The titles Nouvelle version and original 7″ version do not appear on any releases. They are names created by fans in order to distinguish the different versions.

- 7-inch UK (1985 release) Parlophone / R 6115
1. "West End Girls" – 3:55
2. "A Man Could Get Arrested" (7″ version) – 4:50
- 10" limited edition – UK (1985 release) Parlophone / 10R 6115
1. "West End Girls" (10" mix) – 7:05
2. "A Man Could Get Arrested" (Bobby Orlando version) – 4:18
- 12-inch UK (1985 release) Parlophone / 12R 6115
1. "West End Girls" (dance mix) – 6:31
2. "A Man Could Get Arrested" (12″ version) – 4:09
3. "West End Girls" – 3:55
- 12-inch The Shep Pettibone Mastermix – UK (1985 release) Parlophone / 12RA 6115
1. "West End Girls" (The Shep Pettibone Mastermix) – 8:09
2. "West End Dub" – 9:31
3. "A Man Could Get Arrested" (12″ version) – 4:09

== Credits and personnel ==
=== 1984 Bobby O version ===
- Neil Tennant – vocals
- Chris Lowe – keyboards, bassline

with:

- Bobby Orlando – keyboards, synthesizers

=== 1985 Stephen Hague version ===
- Neil Tennant – vocals
- Chris Lowe – synthesizers

with:

- Stephen Hague – synthesizers, emulator "trumpet" solo
- Helena Springs – background vocal

== Charts ==
=== Weekly charts ===
Weekly chart performance for "West End Girls" (original release)
Chart (1985)	Peak position
Canada Top Singles (RPM)	81
Luxembourg (Radio Luxembourg)	2
UK Singles (OCC)	133

Weekly chart performance for "West End Girls" (reissue)
Chart (1986)	Peak position
Australia (Kent Music Report)	5
Austria (Ö3 Austria Top 40)	5
Belgium (Ultratop 50 Flanders)	6
Canada Retail Singles (The Record)	1
Canada Top Singles (RPM)	1
Europe (European Hot 100 Singles)	6
Finland (Suomen virallinen lista)	1
Ireland (IRMA)	2
Japan (Oricon)	98
Netherlands (Dutch Top 40)	3
Netherlands (Single Top 100)	4
New Zealand (Recorded Music NZ)	1
Norway (VG-lista)	1
Quebec (ADISQ)	1
South Africa (Springbok Radio)	2
Spain (AFYVE)	3
Sweden (Sverigetopplistan)	2
Switzerland (Schweizer Hitparade)	2
UK Singles (Official Charts)	1
US Billboard Hot 100	1
US Adult Contemporary (Billboard)	26
US Dance Club Songs (Billboard)	1
US Dance Singles Sales (Billboard)	3
US Hot Black Singles (Billboard)	36
US Mainstream Rock Airplay (Billboard)	37
US Cash Box Top 100	1
US Black Contemporary Singles (Cash Box)	37
West Germany (GfK)	2

2021 weekly chart performance for "West End Girls"
Chart (2021)	Peak position
US Dance/Electronic Digital Song Sales (Billboard)	6

=== Year-end charts ===
1985 year-end chart performance for "West End Girls" (reissue)
Chart (1985)	Position
UK Singles (Gallup)	68

1986 year-end chart performance for "West End Girls" (reissue)
Chart (1986)	Position
Australia (Kent Music Report)	26
Belgium (Ultratop 50 Flanders)	64
Canada Top Singles (RPM)	25
Europe (European Hot 100 Singles)	45
Netherlands (Dutch Top 40)	34
Netherlands (Single Top 100)	67
New Zealand (RIANZ)	5
South Africa (Springbok Radio)	18
UK Singles (Gallup)	65
US Billboard Hot 100	15
US 12-inch Singles Sales (Billboard)	15
US Dance/Disco Club Play (Billboard)	6
US Cash Box Top 100	2
West Germany (Media Control)	13

== Certifications ==
Certifications for "West End Girls"
Region	Certification	Certified units/sales
Canada (Music Canada)	Gold	50,000^{^}
New Zealand (RMNZ)	Platinum	30,000^{‡}
United Kingdom (BPI)	Platinum	600,000^{‡}
^{^} Shipments figures based on certification alone.^{‡} Sales+streaming figures based on certification alone.

== East 17 version ==
"West End Girls"

Single by East 17

from the album Walthamstow
- Released: 14 June 1993
- Length: 3:59
- Label: London
- Songwriters: Neil Tennant; Chris Lowe
- Producers: Mykaell S. Riley; The Groove Corporation

East 17 singles chronology
"Slow It Down" (1993)	"West End Girls" (1993)	"It's Alright" (1993)

Music video
- "West End Girls" on YouTube

In 1993, English boy band East 17 covered "West End Girls" for their debut album, Walthamstow (1993). The single was released in June 1993 by London Records and was a top-10 hit in Australia, Finland, Greece, Israel and Portugal. On the UK Singles Chart, it peaked at number 11. The music video for the song was directed by L. Watson & C. Clunn. Siân Pattenden from Smash Hits gave East 17's version of "West End Girls" three out of five.

=== Track listing ===
- 7-inch single

A. "West End Girls" (Faces on Posters Mix)
B. "West End Girls" (Kicking in Chairs)

=== Charts ===
==== Weekly charts ====
Weekly chart performance for "West End Girls"
Chart (1993)	Peak position
Australia (ARIA)	4
Europe (Eurochart Hot 100)	31
Europe (European Hit Radio)	26
Finland (Suomen virallinen lista)	10
France (SNEP)	48
France Airplay (SNEP)	53
Germany (GfK)	40
Greece (IFPI Greece)	2
Ireland (IRMA)	14
Israel (Israeli Singles Chart)	2
Japan International (Oricon)	38
Netherlands (Single Top 100)	48
Portugal (AFP)	7
UK Singles (Official Charts)	11
UK Airplay (Music Week)	11
UK Dance (Music Week)	45

==== Year-end charts ====
Year-end chart performance for "West End Girls"
Chart (1993)	Position
Australia (ARIA)	56
Israel (Israeli Singles Chart)	38

=== Certifications ===
Certifications for "West End Girls"
Region	Certification	Certified units/sales
Australia (ARIA)	Gold	35,000^{^}
^{^} Shipments figures based on certification alone.

=== Release history ===
Release dates and formats for "West End Girls"
Region	Date	Format(s)	Label(s)	Ref.
United Kingdom	14 June 1993	7-inch vinyl; CD; cassette	London	
Australia	19 July 1993	CD; cassette	London	
Japan	25 July 1993	Mini-CD	London	
Japan	25 August 1993	Remix CD	London	
