= Slow It Down (East 17 song) =

Single by East 17

from the album Walthamstow
- Released: 3 April 1993
- Genre: Pop rap; soul-rap
- Length: 4:45
- Label: London
- Songwriter: Tony Mortimer

East 17 singles chronology
| "Deep" (1993) | "Slow It Down" (1993) | "West End Girls" (1993) |

Music video
- "Slow It Down" on YouTube

"Slow It Down" is a song by British boy band East 17, released in April 1993 by London Records as the fourth single from their debut album, Walthamstow (1993). It was written by band member Tony Mortimer and peaked within the top 10 in Lithuania. In Ireland and the United Kingdom, the single was a top-20 hit.

== Critical reception ==
In his weekly UK chart commentary, James Masterton wrote, "Feeling at last they may have found their niche, the aspiring teen sensations follow up the Top 10 success of "Deep" with another pop/rap track in a similar vein. Whether the same thing twice will sell remains to be seen - it's a tactic rivals Take That have deliberately steered clear of." Roger Morton from NME said, "'Slow It Down', from the Number One Walthamstow record, is a tastefully constructed soul-rap smoocher which effectively approximates LL Cool J getting into a smouldering lurve mood with PM Dawn. Quality bumfluff and better hats than Take That!" Ted Kessler from Select felt it "could be a lost Omar smoochie." Tom Doyle from Smash Hits gave it two out of five, naming it "their weakest single to date."

== Music video ==
A music video was produced to promote the single, directed by Chris Clunn and Lawrence Watson. It shows the band performing in front of a white backdrop.

== Charts ==
=== Weekly charts ===
| Chart (1993) | Peak position |
|---|---|
| Europe (Eurochart Hot 100) | 39 |
| Ireland (IRMA) | 12 |
| Israel (Israeli Singles Chart) | 1 |
| Lithuania (M-1) | 8 |
| Netherlands (Dutch Top 40 Tipparade) | 14 |
| Netherlands (Single Top 100) | 50 |
| UK Singles (Official Charts) | 13 |
| UK Airplay (Music Week) | 20 |
| UK Dance (Music Week) | 57 |

=== Year-end charts ===
| Chart (1993) | Position |
|---|---|
| Israel (Israeli Singles Chart) | 50 |
