= Steve Spiro =

British musician

Steve Spiro is a British musician. He started his musical career as a record producer and remixer, working with artists including the Pet Shop Boys, Talk Talk, The Farm and Imagination. Spiro then went on to work with Paul McCartney's keyboard player Paul Wickens, together they created the BBC theme tune for the Atlanta Olympics in 1996, which was picked up by EMI and went on to be a UK hit. They also scored the music for the clay-motion feature Hamilton Mattress, produced by the makers of Wallace and Gromit .

Spiro has also written music for many high-profile television adverts and programs including Sex and the City and Six Feet Under.

In 2011, Spiro released an album of original electronica/dance music entitled Frequent Traveller. It contained thirteen tracks, twelve of which were named after the railway stations on the Victoria to East Grinstead railway line in South London.

== Selected discography ==
=== Producer ===
Year	Album	Artist
1996	Tara's Theme	Spiro & Wix
2005	Six Feet Under: Everything Ends	Various
2009	Darling/Dance of Fools	Arthur Delaney
