= Encore Theatre Magazine =

British online magazine

Encore Theatre Magazine is an online magazine relating to contemporary theatre published in the United Kingdom.

== History ==
Encore Theatre Magazine begun publication in May 2003. It was inspired by the defunct magazine of the same title (Encore), which had a brief but influential life from 1954 to 1965. The magazine describes its history thus:

"The life of Encore (right) was brief but furious. For little more than a decade, between 1954 and 1965, the magazine railed at the state of British theatre, championing work that it saw as standard-bearing for the experimental, challenging, vital theatre it sought. It was not an ideologically-driven magazine; it was not consistent; it admired the Royal Court, Theatre Workshop, Ionesco, Arden, and Tynan, and it often attacked all of these. But it had passion and it had curiosity. Its standards were invariably high. It knew what it wanted. We've named this site after Encore. We're not reviving the magazine but maybe we can revive its spirit.

Articles published in the original Encore were reprinted in a volume entitled The Encore Reader: A Chronicle of New Drama. According to Robert Brustein, the original magazine Encore embodied both the virtues and the failings of the movement it examined; he criticizes it for being "bursting with energy, vigor, and excitement" but being "seriously lacking in balanced judgments or penetrating ideas."
