= Tony Mortimer =

English singer, songwriter and record producer (born 1970)

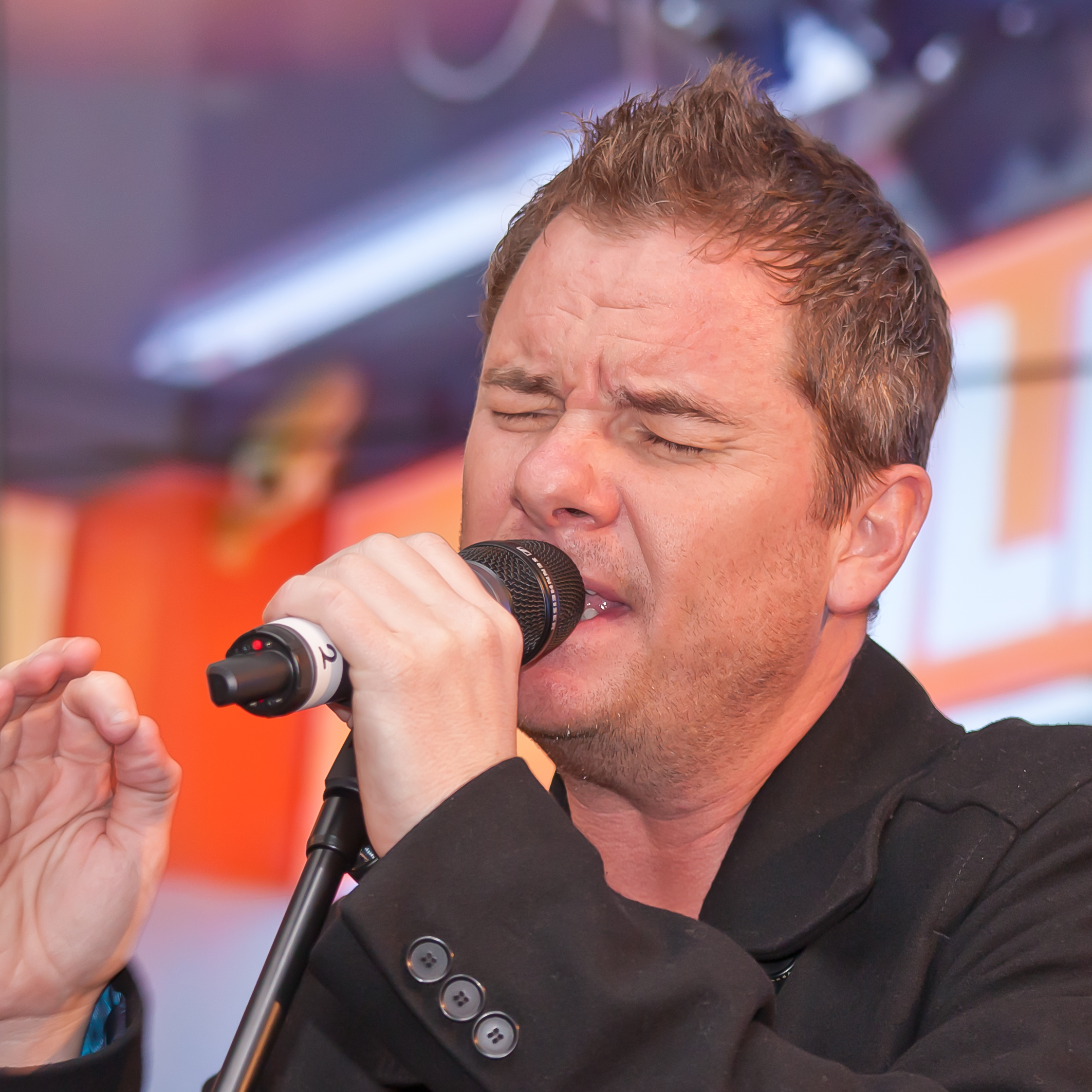
- Mortimer performing with East 17 during a promotional tour in Cologne, Germany in 2012

Background information
- Born: Anthony Michael Mortimer; 21 October 1970 (age 55); London, England
- Genres: Pop; dance-pop; Europop; hip hop; R&B
- Occupations: Singer; songwriter; musician; record producer
- Instruments: Vocals; keyboards
- Years active: 1992–present
- Label: FOD Records (2011–present)

Anthony Michael Mortimer (born 21 October 1970) is an English singer, songwriter and record producer. He is a former member of the boy band East 17, who were originally active from 1991 to 1997 and sold more than 18 million albums worldwide. Mortimer wrote most of the band's songs, which included co-writing their UK number one single, "Stay Another Day".

== Career ==
Mortimer was a member of the 1990s boy band East 17, and was the band's primary songwriter. With East 17, he had seven top-ten singles in the UK singles chart and four albums in the UK Albums Chart between 1992 and 1997. He turned to songwriting when the group disbanded in 1997, due to negative media coverage after fellow member Brian Harvey said that he had taken twelve ecstasy tablets in one night. In 1998, Mortimer's East 17 bandmates briefly re-formed the group without him, and released two singles as E-17. They disbanded again the following year.

During his time in East 17, Mortimer wrote the Childliners "The Gift of Christmas" which was a charity single featuring other popular chart acts including MN8, Backstreet Boys, Peter Andre, Boyzone and Dannii Minogue. Mortimer has continued as a record producer since 1997, from his studio in Essex, as well as recording his own songs including the single "N Toxyc 8".

Mortimer has managed bands, including girl group Urban Angel, whose members included Roxanne Pallett, who wrote some of the group's songs. The band broke up after Pallett won a role in ITV soap opera Emmerdale. In December 2012, Mortimer appeared as a panellist on Channel 5 show The Wright Stuff and again in June 2013. On 17 June 2013, he released his debut solo album Songs from the Suitcase. In early 2014, Mortimer left East 17 to focus on his solo career. In December 2019, Mortimer released a re-recorded version of "Stay Another Day" with the Waltham Forest Youth Choir, to raise money for mental health charity CALM.

== Personal life ==
Mortimer has two daughters with his partner Tracey. The award-winning lyrics of his song "Stay Another Day" were inspired by the death of his brother, Ollie, by suicide. In October 2000, Mortimer was chosen as one of four pall bearers at the funeral of gangster Reggie Kray. Mortimer once collaborated with Kray when he got JJ Gilmour to record a poem Kray had written while in prison. The song has never been released, but Mortimer still has the tape at his home.

== Awards ==
- Ivor Novello Awards
  - Songwriter of the Year (won) (1995)
  - The Best Selling Song – "Stay Another Day" (Brits Award nominated) (1995)
  - The PRS Most Performed Work – "Stay Another Day" (nominated) (1995)

== Discography ==
=== Albums ===
- Songs from the Suitcase (2013)

=== Singles ===
- N Toxyc 8 (2006)
- We Will Stand (with Fighters Forever) (2002)
- Shake It Down (2013)
- Rain in England (with Julian Lennon) (2013)
- Stay Another Day (2013)

== See also ==
- List of Shooting Stars episodes
- List of Never Mind the Buzzcocks episodes
