= East 17 discography =

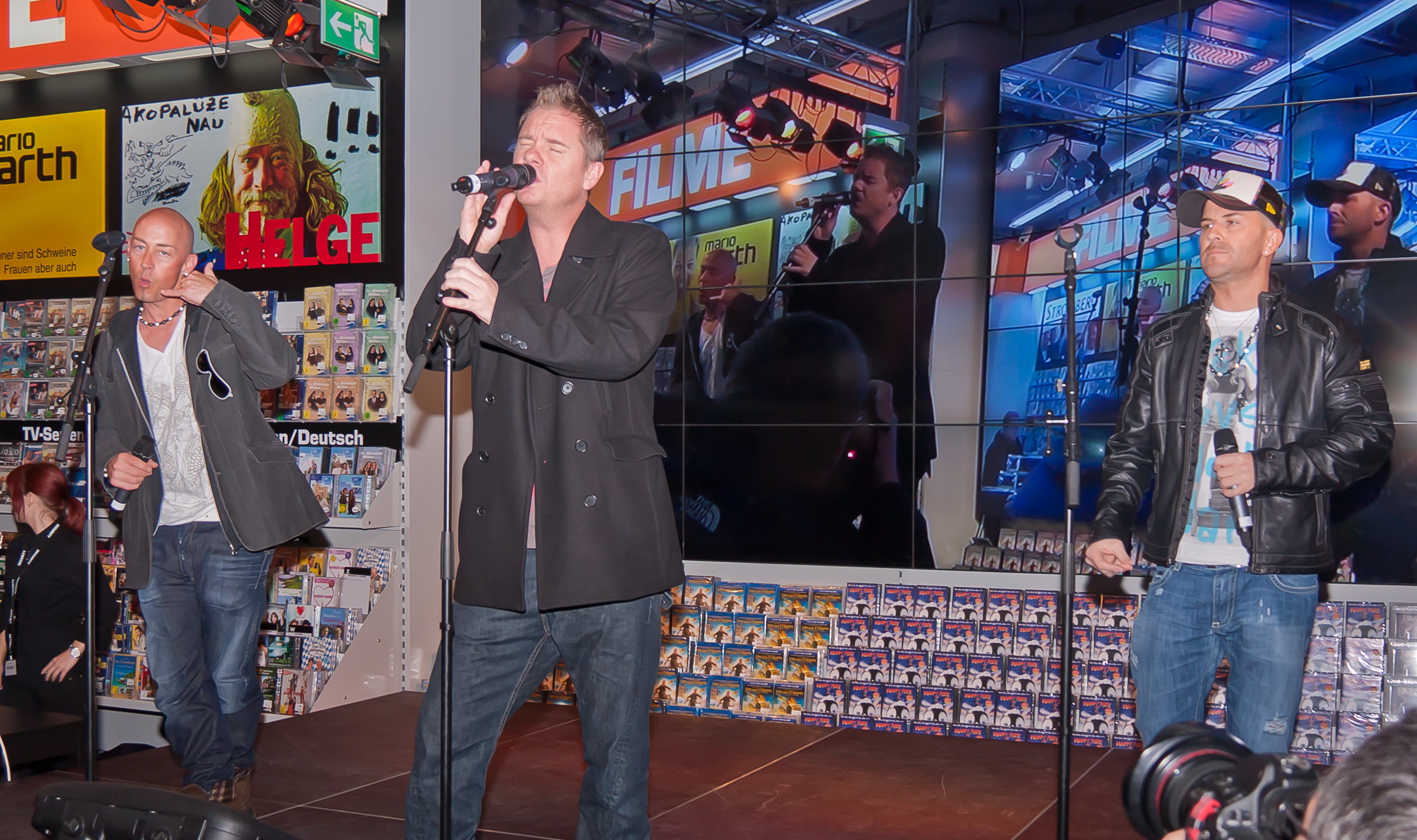
- East 17 performing in Cologne, Germany, 2012
- Studio albums: 6
- Extended plays: 1
- Compilation albums: 4
- Singles: 25
- Music videos: 24

The discography of East 17, a British boy band, consists of six studio albums, four compilation albums, and twenty-five singles.

The band's debut album, Walthamstow, shot to No. 1 on the UK Albums Chart. It featured a string of Top 20 singles, including "House of Love" and "Deep". "It's Alright" became a major success in Australia, reaching No. 1 in early 1994 for 7 weeks in a row and No. 3 in the UK in 1993.

In 1994, upon the release of their second album, Steam, East 17 scored their only UK number-one single with "Stay Another Day". Their next album, Up All Night, was released in 1995. In 1996, the group hit No. 2 with the track "If You Ever", a duet with Gabrielle. They split up in 1997.

In 1998, East 17 were renamed E-17 and released the single "Each Time", which reached No. 2 in the UK. Their next single, "Betcha Can't Wait", went to number 12, but their album Resurrection failed to make the UK top 40. The band was again dropped by their label in 1999 and split for the second time.

In 2011, East 17 released their first single since 1999, titled "Secret of My Life", followed by "I Can't Get You Off My Mind (Crazy)" and its parent album, Dark Light, released in 2012.

In 2017, East 17 released their sixth studio album, 24/7, exclusively in Australia. It was released internationally in 2021.

== Albums ==
=== Studio albums ===
Title	Album details	Peak chart positions										Certifications
Title	Album details	UK	AUS	AUT	FIN	FRA	GER	NL	NOR	SWE	SWI	Certifications
Walthamstow	Released: 15 February 1993; Label: London (#8283732); Formats: CD, CS, LP	1	5	10	2	5	11	17	—	9	22	UK: Platinum; AUS: Platinum; FRA: Platinum; GER: Gold; SWI: Gold
Steam	Released: 17 October 1994; Label: London (#8285422); Formats: CD, CS	3	16	3	23	11	10	12	24	19	8	UK: 2× Platinum; AUS: Gold; FRA: 2× Gold; GER: Gold; SWI: Platinum
Up All Night	Released: 13 November 1995; Label: London (#8286992); Formats: CD, CS	7	72	28	—	30	17	75	32	—	14	UK: Platinum; SWI: Gold
Resurrection	Released: 16 November 1998; Label: Telstar (#TCD 3015); Formats: CD, CS	43	—	—	—	—	61	—	—	—	43	UK: Silver
Dark Light	Released: 2 April 2012; Label: FOD (#FODCD10); Formats: CD, download	—	—	—	—	—	—	—	—	—	—	
24/7	Released: 17 February 2017 (Australia); 27 August 2021 (international); Label: Miroma (Australia); Beyond / So, Lets Talk. (#BRSLTCD1) (international); Formats: CD, download	—	—	—	—	—	—	—	—	—	—	
"—" denotes items that did not chart or were not released in that territory.

=== Compilations ===
Title	Album details	Peak chart positions										Certifications
Title	Album details	UK	AUS	AUT	BEL	FRA	GER	NL	SCO	SWE	SWI	Certifications
Around the World Hit Singles: The Journey So Far	Released: 4 November 1996; Label: London (#8288522); Formats: CD, CS	3	80	33	37	7	10	82	6	38	9	UK: 2× Platinum
The Very Best of East Seventeen	Released: 31 January 2005; Label: London (#WSMCD200); Formats: CD, Download	34	—	—	—	—	—	—	61	—	—	
East 17: The Platinum Collection	Released: 11 December 2006; Label: Warner (#5101-18655-2); Formats: CD	—	—	—	—	—	—	—	—	—	—	
Stay Another Day: The Very Best of East 17	Released: 20 September 2010; Label: Music Club Deluxe (#504); Formats: CD	—	—	—	—	—	—	—	—	—	—	
The Best of East 17	Released: 4 December 2026; Label: London; Formats: CD, LP, digital	—	—	—	—	—	—	—	—	—	—	
"—" denotes items that did not chart or were not released in that territory.

== Singles ==
Title	Year	Peak chart positions										Certifications	Album
Title	Year	UK	AUS	AUT	FIN	FRA	GER	IRE	NL	SWE	SWI	Certifications	Album
"House of Love"	1992	10	5	7	1	8	6	16	21	1	15	AUS: Gold; GER: Gold; SWE: Gold	Walthamstow
"Gold"	1992	28	101	—	3	—	—	—	—	2	35		Walthamstow
"Deep"	1993	5	7	13	13	30	14	7	31	6	32	UK: Silver; AUS: Gold	Walthamstow
"Slow It Down"	1993	13	—	—	—	—	—	12	50	—	—		Walthamstow
"West End Girls"	1993	11	4	—	10	48	40	14	48	—	—	AUS: Gold	Walthamstow
"It's Alright"	1993	3	1	5	15	1	2	1	4	26	1	UK: Silver; AUS: Platinum; FRA: Gold; GER: Platinum	Walthamstow
"Around the World"	1994	3	4	29	7	—	15	4	14	23	16	UK: Silver; AUS: Gold	Steam
"Steam"	1994	7	18	28	12	46	23	6	13	34	12		Steam
"Stay Another Day"	1994	1	3	2	15	7	4	1	5	1	2	UK: 3× Platinum; AUS: Gold; AUT: Gold; GER: Gold; SWE: Gold; SWI: Gold	Steam
"Let It Rain"	1995	10	12	—	10	21	26	5	16	33	25		Steam
"Hold My Body Tight"	1995	12	73	—	—	23	42	10	20	—	28		Steam
"Thunder"	1995	4	36	19	—	13	6	3	21	22	5	UK: Silver; GER: Gold	Up All Night
"Do U Still?"	1996	7	54	—	—	—	23	8	—	—	22		Up All Night
"Someone to Love"	1996	16	—	—	—	—	47	16	—	42	27		Up All Night
"If You Ever" (featuring Gabrielle)	1996	2	—	—	—	19	31	4	38	5	20	UK: Platinum	Around the World Hit Singles: The Journey So Far
"Hey Child"	1997	3	—	—	—	—	46	20	82	—	45		Around the World Hit Singles: The Journey So Far
"Each Time"	1998	2	83	—	—	—	30	9	92	25	20	UK: Silver	Resurrection
"Betcha Can't Wait"	1999	12	—	—	—	—	—	—	—	—	—		Resurrection
"Secret of My Life"	2011	—	—	—	—	—	—	—	—	—	—		Non-album single
"I Can't Get You Off My Mind (Crazy)"	2012	—	—	—	—	—	—	—	—	—	—		Dark Light
"Friday Night"	2012	—	—	—	—	—	—	—	—	—	—		Dark Light
"Counting Clouds"	2012	—	—	—	—	—	—	—	—	—	—		Dark Light
"Strip"	2017	—	—	—	—	—	—	—	—	—	—		24/7
"Crying"	2017	—	—	—	—	—	—	—	—	—	—		24/7
"I Just Wanna"	2022	—	—	—	—	—	—	—	—	—	—		Non-album singles
"Merry Quitmas" (with Riot)	2023	—	—	—	—	—	—	—	—	—	—		Non-album singles
"Tell Me You're the One"	2024	—	—	—	—	—	—	—	—	—	—		Non-album singles
"Megamix"	2026	—	—	—	—	—	—	—	—	—	—		The Best of East 17
"—" denotes items that did not chart or were not released in that territory.

== Home videos ==
Title	Video details	Peak chart positions	Certifications	Notes
Title	Video details	UK Video	Certifications	Notes
Pie & Mash	Released: 29 November 1993; Label: PolyGram (#0877823); Formats: VHS	7		10 songs from the start of their career
Letting Off Steam: The Around the World Tour	Released: 10 October 1994; Label: PolyGram (#780063235839); Formats: VHS	6	UK: Gold	Live concert filmed at the Brighton Centre, Brighton, in May 1994.
No Place Like Home	Released: 9 November 1995; Label: PolyGram (#78006362203); Formats: VHS	6	UK: Gold	Live concert filmed at Wembley Stadium, London, in May 1995.
Greatest Hits	Released: 28 October 1996; Label: PolyGram; Formats: VHS	12		Includes all promotional music videos; Also includes a documentary

== Music videos ==
Year	Song	Director(s)
1992	"House of Love"	Jaswinder Bancil
1992	"House of Love" (Alternate video)	Jaswinder Bancil
1992	"Gold"	Jaswinder Bancil
1993	"Deep"	Richard Heslop
1993	"Slow It Down"	Lawrence Watson & Chris Clunn
1993	"West End Girls"	Lawrence Watson & Chris Clunn
1993	"It's Alright"	Lawrence Watson & Chris Clunn
1994	"Around the World"	Katie Bell
1994	"Steam"	Kevin Godley
1994	"Stay Another Day"	Marcus Adams
1994	"Stay Another Day" (Alternate video)	Marcus Adams
1995	"Let It Rain"	
1995	"Hold My Body Tight"	Lawrence Watson
1995	"Thunder"	Francis Ridley
1996	"Do U Still"	Russell Young
1996	"Someone to Love"	Badger Smith & Iain Titterington
1996	"If You Ever" (featuring Gabrielle)	Badger Smith & Iain Titterington
1997	"Hey Child"	Badger Smith & Iain Titterington
1998	"Each Time"	Nick Quested
1999	"Betcha Can't Wait"	Nick Quested
2011	"Secret of My Life"	Roberto Saku Cinardi
2012	"I Can't Get You Off My Mind (Crazy)"	Lorenzo Vignolo
2013	"Counting Clouds"	
2021	"Crying"	
2023	"Merry Quitmas"	
