= The Very Best of East Seventeen =

Greatest hits album by East 17
- Released: 31 January 2005
- Recorded: 1993–1998
- Genre: Pop
- Label: WEA International

East 17 chronology
Resurrection (1998)	The Very Best of East Seventeen (2005)	East 17: The Platinum Collection (2006)

Professional ratings
Review scores
Source	Rating
Allmusic	4/5 stars

The Very Best of East Seventeen is a greatest hits album from 1990s boy band East 17. The album was released on 31 January 2005.

== Track listing ==
1. "House of Love" from Walthamstow
2. "Deep" from Walthamstow
3. "It's Alright" from Walthamstow
4. "Stay Another Day" from Steam
5. "Steam" from Steam
6. "Let It Rain" from Steam
7. "Slow It Down" from Walthamstow
8. "If You Ever" (featuring Gabrielle) from Around the World Hit Singles: The Journey So Far
9. "West End Girls" from Walthamstow
10. "Around The World" from Steam
11. "Thunder" from Up All Night
12. "Gold" from Walthamstow
13. "Do U Still?" from Up All Night
14. "Someone To Love" from Up All Night
15. "Hey Child" from Around the World Hit Singles: The Journey So Far
16. "Hold My Body Tight" from Steam
17. "Each Time" from Resurrection
18. "Betcha Can't Wait" from Resurrection

== Charts ==
Chart (2005)	Peak position
Scotland (OCC)	61
UK Albums (OCC)	34
