= Around the World Hit Singles: The Journey So Far =

Greatest hits album by East 17
- Released: 4 November 1996
- Recorded: 1992–1996
- Label: London
- Producers: Robin Goodfellow; Ian Curnow; Phil Harding; Richard Stannard; Rob Kean; Mykaell Riley; Mike Rose; Nicholas Foster; The Groove Corporation; Anthony Mortimer

East 17 chronology
Up All Night (1995)	Around the World Hit Singles: The Journey So Far (1996)	Resurrection (1998)

Singles from Around the World Hit Singles: The Journey So Far
- 1. "If You Ever" Released: 21 October 1996; 2. "Hey Child" Released: 6 January 1997

Professional ratings
Review scores
Source	Rating
AllMusic	4.5/5 stars
Melody Maker	(favorable)
Music Week	4/5 stars

Around the World Hit Singles: The Journey So Far is the first greatest hits compilation by British boy band East 17. It was released on 4 November 1996 and has been certified 2× Platinum in the UK.

== Track listing ==
All tracks written by Anthony Mortimer, except where noted.

No.	Title	Writer(s)	Length
1.	"House of Love" (Pedigree Mix)	Mortimer; Robin Goodfellow	4:40
2.	"Deep" (Breath Mix)		4:01
3.	"It's Alright" (Guvnor Mix)		4:41
4.	"Stay Another Day" (S.A.D. Mix)	Mortimer; Rob Kean; Dominic Hawken	4:27
5.	"Steam" (Vapoureyes Mix)	Mortimer; Matt Rowe; Richard Stannard	3:23
6.	"Let It Rain" (Thunder Radio Edit)	Mortimer; Kean; Phil Harding; Ian Curnow	3:33
7.	"Slow It Down" (Perpetual Motion)		4:45
8.	"If You Ever" (with Gabrielle)	Carl Martin	4:14
9.	"West End Girls" (Faces on Posters Mix)	Neil Tennant; Chris Lowe	4:27
10.	"Around the World" (Ourworld Master 7")	Mortimer; Rowe; Stannard; Brian Harvey	4:37
11.	"Thunder" (Radio Edit)		4:16
12.	"Gold" (7" Collar Size)		4:20
13.	"Do U Still?" (Single Remix)		4:18
14.	"Someone to Love" (Summer of Love Mix)		4:00
15.	"Hey Child"	Mortimer; Mike Rose; Nicholas Foster	4:33
16.	"Hold My Body Tight" (7" Radio Edit)	Mortimer; Rowe; Stannard	3:39
17.	"Stay Another Day" (Less Sad Mix)	Mortimer; Kean; Hawken	3:35

Limited edition bonus mix CD

1. "Let It Rain" (Overworld Storm Mix)
2. "Hold My Body Tight" (Danny Tenaglia Vocal Mix)
3. "House of Love" (Wet Nose Dub)
4. "Deep" (Delta Steam House of Funk Mix)
5. "Gold" (Paws on the Floor)
6. "Do U Still?" (Wildchild Vocal Mix)
7. "Steam" (Overworld Haze Mix)
8. "Deep" (Throat Mix)
9. "Let It Rain" (Part One Low Pressure Remix)
10. "Slow It Down" (Speed It Up)

== Charts ==
=== Weekly charts ===
Chart performance for Around the World Hit Singles: The Journey So Far
Chart (1996)	Peak position
Australian Albums (ARIA)	80
Austrian Albums (Ö3 Austria)	33
Belgian Albums (Ultratop Wallonia)	37
Danish Albums (Tracklisten)	15
Dutch Albums (Album Top 100)	82
Estonian Albums (Eesti Top 10)	3
European Albums Chart	20
French Albums (SNEP)	7
German Albums (Offizielle Top 100)	10
Greek Albums (IFPI Greece)	18
Irish Albums (IRMA)	8
Scottish Albums (OCC)	6
Singapore Albums (SPVA)	8
Swedish Albums (Sverigetopplistan)	38
Swiss Albums (Schweizer Hitparade)	9
UK Albums (Official Charts)	3

=== Year-end charts ===
Chart (1996)	Position
UK Albums (OCC)	21

== Certifications ==
Certifications for Around the World Hit Singles: The Journey So Far
Region	Certification	Certified units/sales
United Kingdom (BPI)	2× Platinum	600,000^{^}
Summaries
Europe (IFPI)	Platinum	1,000,000^{*}
Worldwide	—	1,200,000
^{*} Sales figures based on certification alone.^{^} Shipments figures based on certification alone.
