= 20th Century Masters – The Millennium Collection: The Best of Shai =

20th Century Masters: The Millennium Collection: The Best of Shai

Greatest hits album by Shai
- Released: August 14, 2001
- Recorded: 1991–1999
- Genre: R&B
- Label: MCA
- Producer: Various

Shai chronology
Destiny (1999)	20th Century Masters: The Millennium Collection: The Best of Shai (2001)

Professional ratings
Review scores
Source	Rating
AllMusic	4/5 stars

20th Century Masters – The Millennium Collection: The Best of Shai was released on August 14, 2001. The compilation album contains several hit singles of the R&B group.

== Track listing ==
No.	Title	Length
1.	"If I Ever Fall in Love" (Remix)	4:49
2.	"Comforter"	4:11
3.	"Baby I'm Yours"	4:35
4.	"Sexual Interlude"	2:15
5.	"Sexual (Tonight Is the Night)"	5:20
6.	"Changes" (Remix)	4:30
7.	"The Place Where You Belong"	4:22
8.	"Come With Me"	4:40
9.	"I Don't Wanna Be Alone"	4:55
10.	"Mr. Turn U Out"	4:41
11.	"Did You Know"	4:01
12.	"If I Ever Fall in Love" (Original a cappella version)	3:09
