= Right Back at Cha =

EP by Shai
- Released: December 7, 1993
- Recorded: 1992–93
- Genre: R&B
- Length: 49:07
- Labels: Gasoline Alley, MCA

Shai chronology
...If I Ever Fall in Love (1992)	Right Back at Cha (1993)	Blackface (1995)

Right Back at Cha is an album containing unreleased material, remixes and live performances of tracks from the debut album by Shai, ...If I Ever Fall in Love.

Professional ratings
Review scores
Source	Rating
Allmusic	link

== Track listing ==
1. "Live Introduction" – 0:55
2. "Yours" (a cappella) – 5:20
3. "Show Me" – 5:49
4. "Sexual (Tonight Is the Night)" – 5:19
5. "Together Forever" (Live) – 6:08
6. "Come Home to My Love" – 6:07
7. "Waiting for the Day" (Remix) – 4:10
8. "Changes" (Remix) – 4:10
9. "Comforter" (Smooth Mix) – 4:10
10. "If I Ever Fall in Love" (Live) – 6:56

== Charts ==
Chart (1993)	Peak position
Australian Albums (ARIA)	140
