= If I Ever Fall in Love (disambiguation) =

If I Ever Fall in Love is a song by Shai 1992

- If I Ever Fall in Love (album) Shai
- "If I Ever Fall In Love", single by The De Castro Sisters Gene De Paul, Don Raye 1955

== See also ==
- "If I Ever Fall in Love Again", a song written by Steve Dorff and Gloria Sklerov, and performed by Anne Murray and Kenny Rogers as a duet. 1989
- If I Ever Fall In Love (With A Honky Tonk Girl) Faron Young 1970
- If I Ever Fall In Love Again, Jesse Boone And The Astros, Boone 1972
- If I Ever Fall In Love Again, Peter Greenwell from The Crooked Mile (musical) 1959
- If I Should Ever Fall In Love, Gladys Knight And The Pips 1965
