= Blackface (album) =

Studio album by Shai
- Released: September 26, 1995
- Recorded: 1995
- Genre: R&B
- Length: 53:17
- Label: Gasoline Alley/MCA
- Producer: Shai

Shai chronology
Right Back at Cha (1993)	Blackface (1995)	Destiny (1999)

Singles from Blackface
- 1. "Come With Me" Released: 1995; 2. "I Don't Wanna Be Alone" Released: 1995

Blackface is a studio album by the R&B group Shai. It was produced by Shai; the group spent nine months working on it.

The album peaked at No. 42 on the Billboard 200. Its first single was "Come with Me".

== Critical reception ==
Professional ratings
Review scores
Source	Rating
AllMusic	3/5 stars
Los Angeles Times	3/4 stars

The Washington Post concluded that "when Carl Martin, Darnell Van Rensalier, Garfield Bright and Marc Gay stack their voices in one unexpected chord after another, though, they capture the hope and anxiety of young love like few other acts today." The Los Angeles Times determined that Shai "saves its best vocals for the album's one a cappella track, 'If I Gave (A Confession of Hope)', a spiritual that is moving in its sheer simplicity."

AllMusic noted that "the first half of the disc is devoted to seductive slow numbers, while the second part is dominated by deep bass grooves."

== Track listing ==
1. "Come with Me" – 4:39
2. "During the Storm" – 4:38
3. "I Don't Wanna Be Alone" – 4:54
4. "Mr. Turn U Out" – 4:40
5. "Concert a (The Hidden One)" – 1:57
6. "Falling" – 5:11
7. "Planet Solitude" – 1:12
8. "Did You Know" – 4:00
9. "To Get to Know You" – 4:00
10. "Let's Go Back" – 4:22
11. "Will I Find Someone" – 3:53
12. "95" – 3:23
13. "The Place Where You Belong" – 4:21
14. "If I Gave (A Confession of Hope)" – 2:07

== Charts ==
Chart (1995)	Peak position
Australian Albums (ARIA)	111
US (Billboard 200)	42
