= Dominic Hawken =

British musician (1967–2023)

Dominic J. Hawken (1967 – 6 February 2023) was a keyboard player, session musician, music writer and software engineer. His music career started in the 1990s, originally playing with Boy George and Marilyn.

In 1994 he co-wrote "Stay Another Day", the UK number-one single performed by East 17. He was subsequently nominated for two Ivor Novello Awards.

In the 1990s he worked with a number of leading DJs including Danny Rampling and Boilerhouse Boys to record a number of UK hit records, including "Can I Kick It" by A Tribe Called Quest.

He was a founding Director of Deluxe Corporation.

== Death ==
Hawken died on 6 February 2023, at home with his family, from an aggressive form of pancreatic cancer.
