= Shai (group) =

American contemporary R&B group

- Origin: Washington, D.C., United States
- Genre: R&B
- Years active: 1991–present
- Labels: Gasoline Alley/MCA (1991–1996); Big Play (1998–1999); Shai Music (2003–2004); 9 World Wide (2007–2008); Fight 4 Mu (ALIVE) (2008–present)
- Members: Darnell Van Rensalier; Garfield A. Bright; Carl Martin; Marc Gay

Shai (pronounced "shy") is an American vocal R&B/soul quartet that rose to prominence in the 1990s. The group met and formed on the campus of Howard University, influenced by the vocal stylings of Boyz II Men, Jodeci, and Color Me Badd, among others. The group remains best known for their 1992 debut single "If I Ever Fall in Love," which peaked at number two on the Billboard Hot 100.

== History ==
=== Early beginnings and formation ===
Shai (a Swahili word meaning "personification of destiny") was formed on the campus of Howard University. In 1990, Alpha Phi Alpha fraternity brothers, Marc Gay, Carl Martin, and Darnell Van Rensalier invited fellow Howard University student Garfield Bright to join their a capella group after two other founding members, and Jeffrey Talley departed. None of the members had professional singing experience and mostly performed in and around campus for fun, according to Gay.

The group came together seriously after winning a Howard University talent show. From there, they decided to pursue a record deal in New York City but did not receive any offers. Martin later gave Paco Lopez, a local deejay at WPGC radio in DC metro, a demo cassette copy of "If I Ever Fall in Love," and he began promoting the single on the air. In September 1992, the group signed with Gasoline Alley/MCA Records and released their debut album later that year.

=== 1992-1993: If I Ever Fall In Love and Right Back at Cha ===
Shai released "If I Ever Fall in Love" as the first single from the debut album of the same title, which peaked at No. 2 in the U.S. and sold over two million copies. The next two releases from the platinum album, "Comforter" and "Baby I'm Yours", each peaked at No. 10 in the U.S.

At the insistence of the group members, the video for "Baby I'm Yours" was shot on the Howard University campus. The female love interests, including future television host and model Ananda Lewis, and many of the extras were actual Howard students.

The group's next album release was Right Back at Cha, a remix album that largely consisted of new versions of their previous hits and a couple of new songs. A completely reworked version of their previous hit, "Baby I'm Yours," simply titled "Yours," was released as a single (US No. 63).

In 1993, the group won an NAACP Image Award (Outstanding New Artist), and they performed at Bill Clinton's inauguration along with Michael Jackson, Quincy Jones, Ray Charles, and Diana Ross, among others. Additionally, Shai appeared on The Arsenio Hall Show and The Tonight Show.

=== 1994-2001 ===
At the beginning of 1994, Shai made a guest appearance on the sitcom Family Matters in the episode, "Good Cop, Bad Cop", in a dream sequence.

The group released "The Place Where You Belong", from the Beverly Hills Cop III soundtrack. It was the group's final Top 40 single (No. 32 R&B). In late 1995, their follow-up album Blackface was released (No. 42 Pop & No. 15 R&B). It featured their final R&B Top 20 single "Come with Me" (US No. 43). The 1996 remix, "I Don't Wanna Be Alone" (featuring Jay-Z), peaked at No. 89 in the U.S. It was inspired by Belinda Carlisle's "Heaven Is a Place on Earth."

"Song For You" by Rick Braun, featuring Shai, peaked at No. 39 on the R&B chart in 2001.

As of 2025, Shai still performs with each other in various concerts and shows.

== Discography ==
=== Albums ===
List of albums, with selected chart positions
Title	Album details	Peak chart positions		Certification
Title	Album details	US	AUS	Certification
...If I Ever Fall in Love	Released 1992; Label: MCA	6	24	RIAA: Platinum
Right Back at Cha	Released 1993; Label: Gasoline / MCA	127	140	
Blackface	Released 1995; Label: Gasoline / MCA	42	111	
Destiny	Released 1998; Label: Big Play	—	—	
Back from the Mystery System: The Love Cycle	Released 2004	—	—	
Love Cycle: Back from the Mystery System	Released 2007; Label: 9 World Wide	—	—	
Worldwide (as D-n-G of Shai)	Released 2009; Label: Fight4Music	—	—	
Musically Yours	Released June 2018; Label: Cleopatra Records Inc.	—	—	

=== Compilations ===
- 20th Century Masters – The Millennium Collection: The Best of Shai (2001)
- If I Ever Fall in Love: The Best Of (3 re-recorded tracks from the original album) (2011)
- If I Ever Fall in Love: Greatest Hits (same 3 tracks re-recorded with new members Dwayne Jones & George Spencer III) (2011)
- In Concert (2018)

=== Singles ===
List of singles, with selected chart positions
Title	Year	Peak chart positions								Album
Title	Year	US	US R&B/HH	AUS	BEL (FL)	GER	NLD	NZ	UK	Album
"If I Ever Fall in Love"	1992	2	1	4	21	47	11	5	36	...If I Ever Fall in Love
"Comforter"	1993	10	4	—	—	—	—	24	—	...If I Ever Fall in Love
"Baby I'm Yours"	1993	10	16	70	—	—	—	40	—	...If I Ever Fall in Love
"Together Forever"	1993	—	89	—	—	—	—	—	—	...If I Ever Fall in Love
"Yours"	1993	63	56	—	—	—	—	—	—	...If I Ever Fall in Love
"The Place Where You Belong"	1994	34	21	—	—	—	—	—	—	Beverly Hills Cop III
"Come with Me"	1995	43	15	91	—	—	—	25	—	Blackface
"I Don't Wanna Be Alone"	1995	89	51	197	—	—	—	27	—	Blackface
"Destiny" (promo only)	1998	—	—	—	—	—	—	—	—	Destiny
"He's Doing You Wrong" (promo only)	1998	—	—	—	—	—	—	—	—	Destiny
"—" denotes releases that did not chart or were not released.

== Filmography ==
- Video Personification: Vol. 1 (1993)

== Awards and nominations ==
- NAACP Image Awards (1993), Outstanding new artist - winner
- Soul Train Music Awards (1993), Best New R&B/Soul Artist - nominee
