= Love Cycle: Back from the Mystery System =

Studio album by Shai
- Released: August 7, 2007
- Recorded: 2003–2007
- Genre: R&B
- Length: 59:00
- Producer: Shai

Shai chronology
Back from the Mystery System: The Love Cycle (2004)	Love Cycle: Back from the Mystery System (2007)

Love Cycle: Back from the Mystery System is an album by Shai. It's a re-release of Back from the Mystery System: The Love Cycle, with additional tracks.

== Track listing ==
1. "WKMT Radio (Intro)"
2. "Tell Me"
3. "Ready or Not"
4. "Dearly Beloved"
5. "Girl I Live"
6. "WKMT Radio (Live Caller)"
7. "There Is Something"
8. "Whenever I Fall"
9. "That Feeling"
10. "I Promise"
11. "I Want to Love You"
12. "WKMT Radio (Station Identification)"
13. "Fools Rush In"
14. "First Time"
15. "I Don't Know"
16. "Happy Song"
17. "WKMT Radio (Sign Off)"
