= Thunder (East 17 song) =

1995 single by East 17

Single by East 17

from the album Up All Night
- B-side: "E-17 - Overture Medley"
- Released: 23 October 1995
- Length: 4:16
- Label: London
- Songwriter: Tony Mortimer
- Producers: Ian Curnow; Phil Harding; Rob Kean; Tony Mortimer

East 17 singles chronology
"Hold My Body Tight" (1995)	"Thunder" (1995)	"Do U Still?" (1996)

Music video
- "Thunder" on YouTube

"Thunder" is a song recorded by English boy band East 17, released on 23 October 1995 by London Records as the first single from their third album, Up All Night (1995). It was written by band member Tony Mortimer, who co-produced it with Ian Curnow, Phil Harding and Rob Kean. The song achieved success in many countries, including Belgium (Wallonia), Germany, Indonesia, Ireland, Norway, Switzerland and the UK, where it was a top-10 hit. Its music video was directed by Francis Ridley, featuring the band performing at an indoor set, where it later begins to rain.

== Critical reception ==
Victoria Segal from Melody Maker noted the "bizarre fantasia" of "Thunder". A reviewer from Music Week gave the song three out of five, writing, "A bland, lyrically-lacking rehash of all the elements which has made East 17 so successful. But it's catchy enough to create a stir." Pan-European magazine Music & Media described it as "a theatrical ballad with a great melodic hook." John Robinson from NME commented, "Continuing the preoccupation with meteorological phenomena that began with 'Let It Rain', this is East 17's gothic ballad. Featuring extensive use of those slightly annoying DUM-DUM-DUM-DIDDLY-CRASH drum fills from Phil Collins' first batch of My Wife Left Me records, 'Thunder' finds the lean 'Teen out among the elements being called by a distant rumble to an intriguing and no doubt even sexual liaison under purple skies where the wild horses roam." Mark Frith from Smash Hits gave it a top score of five out of five, writing, "This is the finest record ever made. It is moving, dramatic, classic, catchy and genuinely wonderful. [...] After repeated listenings, 'Thunder' still maintains its impact, and is as classy as 'Deep' and 'Stay Another Day'."

== Track listings ==
- CD single
1. "Thunder" (Radio Edit) – 4:16
2. "E-17 - Overture Medley" * (Live Steam Tour '95) – 9:28
- CD maxi
1. "Thunder" (Radio Edit)
2. "E-17 - Overture Medley" (Live Steam Tour '95)
3. "Thunder" (Video Mix)
4. "Thunder" (Lightning Mix)
- Cassette
1. "Thunder" (Radio Edit) – 4:16
2. "E-17 - Overture Medley" * (Live Steam Tour '95) – 9:28

* Contains "Let It Rain", "Stay Another Day", "House of Love", "Gold", "It's Alright", "Be There"

== Credits ==
- Written by Anthony Mortimer
- Artwork by E.17/Form
- Photography of the band by Lawrence Watson
- Photography of the Cloud by Comstock, Inc.

== Charts ==
=== Weekly charts ===
Chart (1995–1996)	Peak position
Australia (ARIA)	36
Austria (Ö3 Austria Top 75)	19
Belgium (Ultratop Flanders)	13
Belgium (Ultratop Wallonia)	8
Denmark (IFPI)	9
Estonia (Eesti Top 20)	4
Europe (Eurochart Hot 100)	6
Europe (European AC Radio)	11
Europe (European Hit Radio)	6
Europe (Channel Crossovers)	2
France (SNEP)	13
France Airplay (SNEP)	31
Germany (Media Control)	6
Greece (IFPI Greece)	2
Hungary (Mahasz)	1
Iceland (Íslenski Listinn Topp 40)	39
Indonesia (IFPI)	5
Ireland (IRMA)	3
Israel (Israeli Singles Chart)	3
Italy (Musica e dischi)	21
Italy Airplay (Music & Media)	8
Japan International (Oricon)	12
Latvia (Latvijas Top 20)	2
Lithuania (M-1)	1
Netherlands (Dutch Top 40)	19
Netherlands (Single Top 100)	21
Norway (VG-lista)	7
Scotland (OCC)	5
Spain Airplay (Top 40 Radio)	33
Sweden (Sverigetopplistan)	22
Switzerland (Swiss Hitparade)	5
UK Singles (OCC)	4
UK Airplay (Music Week)	15

=== Year-end charts ===
Chart (1995)	Position
Europe (Eurochart Hot 100)	89
Israel (Israeli Singles Chart)	9
Latvia (Latvijas Top 50)	33
Norway (VG-lista)	9
UK Singles (OCC)	31

Chart (1996)	Position
Europe (Eurochart Hot 100)	90
Latvia (Latvijas Top 50)	37

== Certifications ==
Region	Certification	Certified units/sales
Germany (BVMI)	Gold	250,000^{^}
United Kingdom (BPI)	Silver	200,000^{^}
^{^} Shipments figures based on certification alone.

== Release history ==
Region	Date	Format(s)	Label(s)	Ref.
United Kingdom	23 October 1995	CD; cassette	London	
Australia	20 November 1995	CD; cassette	London	
Australia	27 November 1995	CD digipak	London	
Japan	1 December 1995	CD	London	
