= Back from the Mystery System: The Love Cycle =

Studio album by Shai
- Released: April 29, 2004
- Recorded: 2003–2004
- Genre: R&B
- Length: 43:27
- Producer: Shai

Shai chronology
Destiny (1999)	Back from the Mystery System: The Love Cycle (2004)	Love Cycle: Back from the Mystery System (2007)

Back from the Mystery System: The Love Cycle is an album by Shai, released on April 29, 2004. It was distributed electronically by CD Baby.

== Track listing ==
1. "Tell Me"
2. "Sexcapade"
3. "Sunshine"
4. "Fools Rush In"
5. "Complete Love"
6. "Runaway"
7. "Ain't Got Time for Love"
8. "Don't Wait Too Long"
9. "Back in the Days"
10. "That Feeling"
