= Up All Night (East 17 album) =

Studio album by East 17
- Released: 13 November 1995
- Recorded: 1995
- Genre: Pop
- Length: 61:14
- Label: London
- Producers: Brian Harvey; John Hendy; Phil Harding; Ian Curnow; Tony Mortimer; Terry Coldwell

East 17 chronology
Steam (1994)	Up All Night (1995)	Around the World Hit Singles: The Journey So Far (1996)

Singles from Up All Night
- 1. "Thunder" Released: 23 October 1995; 2. "Do U Still?" Released: 29 January 1996; 3. "Someone to Love" Released: 29 July 1996

Professional ratings
Review scores
Source	Rating
AllMusic	3/5 stars
The Guardian	1/5 stars
Music & Media	favourable
Music Week	3/5 stars
NME	8/10
Smash Hits	5/5 stars

Up All Night is the third studio album by East 17 and the last to feature the group's entire original lineup. It was released in November 1995. It is notable in that all members of the group made songwriting contributions to the album, although all three singles released were still penned solely by Tony Mortimer.

The album was certified as Platinum in the UK.

== Track listing ==
Standard version
No.	Title	Writer(s)	Producer(s)	Length
1.	"Innocent Erotic"	John Hendy, Tony Vickers, Rob Kean	Phil Harding, Ian Curnow, Hendy	5:53
2.	"Thunder"	Tony Mortimer	Harding, Curnow, Mortimer, Ian Stanley^{[a]}	4:54
3.	"I Remember"	Terry Coldwell, Dominic Hawken	Harding, Curnow, Coldwell	3:43
4.	"Do U Still?"	Mortimer	Harding, Curnow, Mortimer	4:18
5.	"Gotta Keep On"	Brian Harvey	Harding, Curnow, Harvey	5:12
6.	"Ghetto"	Harvey, Andy Reynolds	Harding, Curnow, Harvey	5:45
7.	"Looking For"	Coldwell	Harding, Curnow, Coldwell	4:07
8.	"Best Days"	Hendy, Vickers, Kean	Harding, Curnow, Hendy	3:25
9.	"Don't You Feel So Good"	Coldwell, Hawken	Harding, Curnow, Coldwell	3:50
10.	"Free Your Mind"	Hendy, Vickers, Kean	Harding, Curnow, Hendy	4:21
11.	"Right Here with You"	Harvey	Harding, Curnow, Harvey	5:04
12.	"Someone to Love"	Mortimer	Harding, Curnow, Mortimer	4:25
13.	"It's All Over"	Mortimer	Harding, Curnow, Mortimer	6:17
Total length:				61:14

Japanese version (bonus track)
No.	Title	Length
14.	"Overture Medley (from Letting Off Steam Tour '94)" ("Let It Rain" / "Stay Another Day" / "House of Love" / "Gold" / "It's Alright" / "Be There")	9:29
Total length:		70:43

Notes

- ^{^[a]} signifies a producer

== Charts ==
=== Weekly charts ===
Weekly chart performance for Up All Night
Chart (1995)	Peak position
Australian Albums (ARIA)	72
Austrian Albums (Ö3 Austria)	28
Belgian Albums (Ultratop Wallonia)	23
Dutch Albums (Album Top 100)	75
Estonian Albums (Eesti Top 10)	5
European Albums Chart	17
French Albums (SNEP)	30
German Albums (Offizielle Top 100)	17
Greek Albums (IFPI Greece)	6
Hungarian Albums (MAHASZ)	15
Irish Albums (IRMA)	12
Italian Albums (FIMI)	11
Norwegian Albums (VG-lista)	32
Russian Albums (NFPF)	1
Scottish Albums (OCC)	13
Swiss Albums (Schweizer Hitparade)	14
UK Albums (Official Charts)	7

=== Year-end charts ===
Year-end chart performance for Up All Night
Chart (1995)	Position
UK Albums (OCC)	39
Chart (1996)	Position
German Albums (Offizielle Top 100)	90

== Certifications ==
Certifications for Up All Night
Region	Certification	Certified units/sales
Switzerland (IFPI Switzerland)	Gold	25,000^{^}
United Kingdom (BPI)	Platinum	300,000^{^}
^{^} Shipments figures based on certification alone.
