= Each Time =

1998 single by E-17

Single by E-17

from the album Resurrection
- Released: 2 November 1998
- Genre: R&B
- Length: 4:01
- Label: Telstar
- Songwriters: Brian Harvey; John Hendy; Terry Coldwell; Ivor Reid; John Beckford; Mark Reid
- Producers: Ivor Reid; John Beckford; Mark Reid

E-17 singles chronology
| "Hey Child" (1997) | "Each Time" (1998) | "Betcha Can't Wait" (1999) |

Music video
- "Each Time" on YouTube

"Each Time" is the first single released by English pop group East 17 under the name E-17. It was issued as the lead single from their fourth studio album, Resurrection (1998), on 2 November 1998 by Telstar Records. The song marked a stylistic change for the band following their first split, the departure of member Tony Mortimer, and a change of record labels. "Each Time" became the band's final top-10 hit in the United Kingdom, debuting and peaking at number two on the UK Singles Chart. It was their final chart hit in most other countries, including Germany, Ireland, New Zealand, Sweden, and Switzerland.

== Composition ==
The album version of "Each Time" is three minutes and forty-seven seconds, but the single version is extended to four minutes and one second. The song diverts from the band's established pop sound in favor of an R&B style in the vein of Stevie Wonder's music from the 1970s.

== Critical reception ==
Music & Media magazine wrote that the band's new R&B sound fit them "surprisingly well". In Oxfordshire, Fox FM head of music Stuart Davies also agreed that the band's new style suited them well and called the song "excellent".

== Chart performance ==
On 8 November 1998, "Each Time" debuted at number two on the UK Singles Chart, selling 72,000 copies during its opening week. It remained on the chart for 15 nonconsecutive weeks, becoming the band's final top-10 hit in the UK. In November 2021, the British Phonographic Industry (BPI) awarded the song a silver certification for sales and streams exceeding 200,000 units. The single also charted within the top 10 in Ireland, peaking at number nine. In Europe, "Each Time" reached number 20 in Switzerland, number 25 in Sweden, and number 30 in Germany, experiencing minor success in the Netherlands and the Flanders region of Belgium. On the Eurochart Hot 100, it debuted and peaked at number 10. In New Zealand, the single charted at number 23 on 30 May 1999, becoming the band's second-highest-peaking single there, after "Around the World". It was not as successful in Australia, stalling at number 83 on the ARIA Singles Chart.

== Track listings ==
The Resurrection album sampler consists of three tracks: "Ain't No Stoppin'", "Sleeping in My Head", and "I'm Here for You"

- UK and Irish CD1
1. "Each Time" (radio edit) – 4:00
2. "Each Time" (K-Gee remix) – 4:37
3. Resurrection album sampler – 4:12
- UK and Irish CD2
1. "Each Time" (radio edit) – 4:01
2. "Each Time" (Sunship remix edit) – 3:57
3. "Each Time" (Full Crew remix) – 4:48
4. "Each Time" (Funk Force Low Pressure remix edit) – 5:23
- UK and Irish cassette single
1. "Each Time" (radio edit)
2. "Each Time" (Sunship remix)
3. Resurrection album sampler
- Benelux CD single
1. "Each Time" (radio edit) – 3:56
2. "Each Time" (Full Crew remix) – 4:45
- German maxi-CD
1. "Each Time" (radio edit) – 4:01
2. "Each Time" (Full Crew remix) – 4:48
3. "Each Time" (K-Gee remix) – 4:38
4. "Each Time" (Sunship remix) – 5:51
5. Urban Navigator (video, photos, biography)

== Charts ==
=== Weekly charts ===
| Chart (1998–1999) | Peak position |
|---|---|
| Australia (ARIA) | 83 |
| Belgium (Ultratip Bubbling Under Flanders) | 14 |
| Europe (Eurochart Hot 100) | 10 |
| Europe (European Hit Radio) | 44 |
| Germany (GfK) | 30 |
| Greece (IFPI Greece) | 5 |
| Ireland (IRMA) | 9 |
| Netherlands (Dutch Top 40 Tipparade) | 18 |
| Netherlands (Single Top 100) | 92 |
| New Zealand (Recorded Music NZ) | 23 |
| Scottish Singles Sales (Official Charts) | 7 |
| Spain Airplay (Top 40 Radio) | 39 |
| Sweden (Sverigetopplistan) | 25 |
| Switzerland (Schweizer Hitparade) | 20 |
| UK Singles (Official Charts) | 2 |
| UK Airplay (Music Week) | 8 |
| UK Hip Hop/R&B (Official Charts) | 1 |

=== Year-end charts ===
| Chart (1998) | Position |
|---|---|
| UK Singles (OCC) | 105 |

== Certifications ==
| Region | Certification | Certified units/sales |
|---|---|---|
| United Kingdom (BPI) | Silver | 200,000^{‡} |
^{‡} Sales+streaming figures based on certification alone.
