= Someone to Love (East 17 song) =

1996 single by East 17

Single by East 17

from the album Up All Night
- Released: 29 July 1996
- Length: 4:00
- Label: London
- Songwriter: Tony Mortimer
- Producers: Ian Curnow; Phil Harding; Rob Kean; Tony Mortimer

East 17 singles chronology
"Do U Still?" (1996)	"Someone to Love" (1996)	"If You Ever" (1996)

Music video
- "Someone to Love" on YouTube

"Someone to Love" is a song recorded by English boy band East 17, released on 29 July 1996 by London Records as the third and final single from their third album, Up All Night (1995). It was written by band member Tony Mortimer, who co-produced it with Ian Curnow, Phil Harding and Rob Kean.

== Critical reception ==
Johnny Dee from NME noted that "unlike their peers, East 17 have always been credible, they are the Oasis you can dance to", whilst also noting the similar sound to them of this single.

== Music video ==
The music video for "Someone to Love" was directed by Badger Smith and Iain Titterington. "Someone to Love" begins with the band and family and friends in a mansion before everyone moves outside to continue socialising in the garden.

== Track listings ==
- CD single
1. "Someone to Love" (Summer of Love Mix) – 4:00
2. "Steam" (Vapoureyes Mix) – 3:23
3. "Someone To Love" (Near Naked Mix) – 4:31

== Charts ==
Chart (1996)	Peak position
Estonia (Eesti Top 20)	10
Europe (Eurochart Hot 100)	47
Europe (European AC Radio)	13
Europe (European Hit Radio)	26
Europe (Channel Crossovers)	14
Germany (GfK)	47
Greece (IFPI Greece)	15
Hungary (Mahasz)	17
Ireland (IRMA)	16
Israel (Israeli Singles Chart)	2
Latvia (Latvijas Top 20)	10
Scotland (OCC)	13
Spain Airplay (Top 40 Radio)	30
Sweden (Sverigetopplistan)	42
Switzerland (Schweizer Hitparade)	27
UK Singles (OCC)	16
UK Airplay (Music Week)	18
