= Destiny (Shai album) =

Studio album by Shai
- Released: February 16, 1999
- Recorded: 1998–1999
- Genre: R&B
- Length: 53:15
- Label: Big Play

Shai chronology
Blackface (1995)	Destiny (1999)	Back from the Mystery System: The Love Cycle (2004)

Destiny is a studio album by American R&B group Shai. It was released on February 16, 1999, by Big Play Records.

It was their first album as a trio, after the departure of Carl Martin.

== Critical reception ==
Professional ratings
Review scores
Source	Rating
AllMusic	3/5 stars

The New York Post called the album "a mature, solid collection that should get this D.C.-based band some deserved national attention." MTV wrote that Destiny "is more blunder than wonder, the group a mere shadow of a once-vibrant R&B ensemble."

== Track listing ==
1. "Destiny" – 5:14
  - Featuring KRS-One
2. "Before I Go" – 3:54
3. "Zodiac" – 4:52
4. "He's Doing You Wrong" – 4:24
5. "Last Time We Talked" – 4:53
6. "(Interlude)" – 0:49
7. "Can't Stop the Rain" – 4:56
8. "Hard When You Love Someone" – 4:16
9. "Hold on to Love" – 4:44
  - Featuring Miss Jones
10. "You Got Me Twisted" – 3:36
11. "Sunshine" – 4:32
12. "If I Spend the Night" – 7:05
