= ...If I Ever Fall in Love =

Studio album by Shai
- Released: December 22, 1992
- Recorded: 1991–1992
- Genre: R&B
- Length: 49:00
- Label: MCA
- Producer: Carl "Groove" Martin; Marc Gay; Darnell VanRensalier

Shai chronology
...If I Ever Fall in Love (1992)	Right Back at Cha (1993)

Singles from ...If I Ever Fall in Love
- 1. "If I Ever Fall in Love" Released: September 1, 1992; 2. "Comforter" Released: January 19, 1993; 3. "Baby I'm Yours" Released: 1993; 4. "Together Forever" Released: 1993; 5. "Yours" Released: 1993

...If I Ever Fall in Love is the debut album of American R&B group Shai, released December 22, 1992, on MCA Records. It was produced by group members Carl "Groove" Martin and Darnell Van Rensalier.

The album produced three hit singles, "If I Ever Fall in Love", "Comforter", and "Baby I'm Yours". On January 13, 1994, ...If I Ever Fall in Love was certified double platinum by the Recording Industry Association of America (RIAA), for shipments of two million copies in the United States. Although it performed well commercially, the album received generally mixed reviews from music critics.

== Reception ==
Professional ratings
Review scores
Source	Rating
AllMusic	2.5/5 stars
Robert Christgau	B−
Entertainment Weekly	B−
Music Week	4/5 stars
The Philadelphia Inquirer	3/4 stars
Rolling Stone	3.5/5 stars

Rolling Stone gave the album three-and-a-half out of five stars and complimented its "crisp, precise harmonies that imply explosive vocal power but display few pyrotechnics", adding that "Shai joins the spiritual yearnings of Take Six with the secular pull of Boyz II Men". David Browne of Entertainment Weekly found its hip hop and new jack swing-oriented songs "fussy [and] unconvincing", but praised the group's crooning and stated, "They wrap their voices like a thick shag carpet around the choruses of the album's languorous, starry-eyed ballads".

However, in his consumer guide for The Village Voice, critic Robert Christgau gave the album a B− rating and named it "dud of the month", indicating "a bad record whose details rarely merit further thought". Christgau found the group's singing "indifferent" and panned them as having "no class and no sense of humor; they're too smarmy and too slow", adding that "They epitomize the difference between seduction and betrayal--between shared lie and imposed illusion, rascal and bounder, rogue and complete asshole. There's not a winning wink on the entire album". In a retrospective review, AllMusic editor Stephen Thomas Erlewine stated, "Apart from the gorgeous title track, most of the material on ...If I Ever Fall in Love is underdeveloped; although Shai sound terrific, their material doesn't match their vocal talents."

== Track listing ==
...If I Ever Fall in Love track listing
No.	Title	Writer(s)	Producer(s)	Length
1.	"Sexual Interlude"	Carl "Groove" Martin; Marc Gay	Carl "Groove" Martin	2:15
2.	"Comforter"	Martin; Gay; Darnell Van Rensalier	Martin	4:10
3.	"If I Ever Fall in Love" (Remix)	Martin	Martin	4:49
4.	"Sexual"	Martin; Gay	Martin	5:31
5.	"Together Forever"	Gay	Gay	5:14
6.	"If I Ever Fall in Love" (Original a cappella version)	Martin	Martin	3:09
7.	"Flava"	Martin; Gay; Garfield Bright; Van Rensalier	Shai	3:52
8.	"Baby I'm Yours"	Martin; Gay	Martin	4:34
9.	"Waiting for the Day"	Martin; Gina "Go-Go" Gomez; Van Rensalier	Martin	4:45
10.	"Changes"	Gay; Van Rensalier	Gay; Van Rensalier	4:30
11.	"Don't Wanna Play"	Bright; Gay; Van Rensalier	Bright; Van Rensalier; Gay	5:06
12.	"Lord I've Come"	Van Rensalier; Gay; Bright	Shai	0:57

== Personnel ==
- Bill Appleberry – keyboards
- Paul Brown – engineer, mixing
- Jeff Carruthers – programming
- Mario Castellanos – photography
- Jim Ebert – mixing
- James Elliott – production coordination
- Marc Gay – keyboards, producer
- Eric Greedy – assistant engineer
- Steve Hall – mastering
- Kevin Levi – saxophone
- Carl "Groove" Martin – keyboards, producer, programming
- Ken Schubert – engineer
- Darnell VanRensalier – drum programming, keyboards, producer
- Cyndra Williams – make-up

== Charts ==
Chart performance for ...If I Ever Fall in Love
Chart (1993)	Peak position
Australian Albums (ARIA)	24
Dutch Albums (Album Top 100)	21
US Billboard 200	6
US Top R&B/Hip-Hop Albums (Billboard)	3

== Certifications ==
Certifications for ...If I Ever Fall in Love
Region	Certification	Certified units/sales
United States (RIAA)	2× Platinum	2,000,000^{^}
^{^} Shipments figures based on certification alone.
