= Hey Child (East 17 song) =

1997 single by East 17

Single by East 17

from the album Around the World (the Journey So Far)
- Released: 6 January 1997
- Length: 4:06
- Label: London
- Songwriter: Anthony Mortimer
- Producers: Mike Rose; Nicholas Foster

East 17 singles chronology
"If You Ever" (1996)	"Hey Child" (1997)	"Each Time" (1998)

Music video
- "Hey Child" on YouTube

"Hey Child" is a song by British boy band East 17 released by London Records. The song was the second and final single from East 17's first Greatest Hits compilation, Around the World Hit Singles: The Journey So Far (1996), released on 6 January 1997.

== Critical reception ==
Victoria Segal from Melody Maker noted "new track 'Hey Child' is grisly as only a song called 'Hey Child' can be."

== Music video ==
The music video for "Hey Child" was directed by Badger Smith and Iain Titterington. "Hey Child" music video features lead vocalist on the song Tony Mortimer performing in front of children facing different scenarios, all in colour, whilst intercut with the whole group singing the song against a white background, shot in black and white.

== Brian Harvey comments: Media and public fallout ==
This was the final single released by the original band members following lead singer Brian Harvey's dismissal on 18 January 1997 during promotion of this single.

Harvey was sacked from East 17 after making comments in a radio interview that appeared to condone the use of the drug ecstasy, in which he claimed to have taken 12 pills in one night. These comments caused an uproar in the press and general public with the matter being raised by Member of Parliament Barry Legg during Prime Minister's Questions. The band were subsequently blacklisted from UK radio stations where some DJs even smashed the band's CDs on-air in protest. The group were also blocked from all mainstream youth media outlets and lost a considerable amount of their young fans in the aftermath of the controversy.

Tony Mortimer left East 17 several months later after Harvey was allowed to rejoin the group who then re-launched under the rebranded name of E-17.

== Track listings ==
- CD single
1. "Hey Child" (7" Radio Edit) - 4:06
2. "Hey Child" (Matthew Roberts' Low Pressure Phunk Remix) - 8:19
3. "Hey Child" (Trade Mix) - 6:25
4. "Hey Child" (4 X Men Mix) - 5:33

== Charts ==
Chart (1997)	Peak position
Belgium (Ultratip Bubbling Under Flanders)	14
Estonia (Eesti Top 20)	4
Europe (Eurochart Hot 100)	42
Europe (European Hit Radio)	42
Germany (GfK)	46
Greece (IFPI Greece)	12
Ireland (IRMA)	20
Israel (IBA)	6
Netherlands (Single Top 100)	82
Poland Airplay (Music & Media)	11
Scottish Singles Sales (Official Charts)	6
Switzerland (Schweizer Hitparade)	45
UK Singles (Official Charts)	3
UK Airplay (Music Week)	17

=== Year-end charts ===
Chart (1997)	Position
UK Singles (OCC)	141
