= Resurrection (East 17 album) =

Studio album by E-17
- Released: 16 November 1998
- Recorded: 1998
- Genre: Pop
- Label: Telstar
- Producer: Ivor Reid; John Beckford; Mark Reid

East 17 chronology
Around the World Hit Singles: The Journey So Far (1996)	Resurrection (1998)	The Very Best of East Seventeen (2005)

Singles from Resurrection
- 1. "Each Time" Released: 2 November 1998; 2. "Betcha Can't Wait" Released: 1 March 1999

Resurrection is the fourth studio album by the English boy band East 17 and their only album under the E-17 name. The album was released on 16 November 1998 as their first album as a trio, following Tony Mortimer's departure and initial split the year prior.

"Each Time" and "Betcha Can't Wait" were released as singles. "Each Time" peaked at No. 2 on the UK Singles Chart, while "Betcha Can't Wait" peaked at No. 12.

Despite each single being top 20 hits, the album failed to repeat the success of their first three albums, peaking at number 43 on the UK Albums Chart and the band would be dropped by their record label Telstar Records in 1999, resulting in their second split and eventual reunion in 2006, as well as that it would be their last studio album until Dark Light fourteen years later.

== Greatest ==
In 2013, Resurrection was re-released via the Demon Music Group under the name Greatest with a slightly re-arranged track listing.

== Track listing ==
1. "Each Time"
2. "Sleeping in My Head"
3. "Tell Me What You Want"
4. "Betcha Can't Wait"
5. "Anything (Interlude)"
6. "Daddy's Gonna Love You"
7. "I'm Here for You"
8. "Ain't No Stoppin'"
9. "Falling in Love Again"
10. "Whatever You Need"
11. "Coming Home" (Interlude)
12. "I Miss You"
13. "Another Time"
14. "Lately"

A hidden track titled "Start It" is in the pre-gap before "Each Time". The CD can be rewound on most CD players to 4:27.

== Charts ==
Chart (1999)	Peak position
German Albums (Offizielle Top 100)	61
Swiss Albums (Schweizer Hitparade)	43
UK Albums (OCC)	43

== Certifications ==
Region	Certification	Certified units/sales
United Kingdom (BPI)	Silver	60,000^{^}
^{^} Shipments figures based on certification alone.
