= Do U Still? =

1996 single by East 17

Single by East 17

from the album Up All Night
- B-side: "Holding On"
- Released: 29 January 1996
- Genre: Soul-pop
- Length: 4:18
- Label: London
- Songwriter: Tony Mortimer
- Producers: Ian Curnow; Phil Harding; Rob Kean; Tony Mortimer

East 17 singles chronology
"Thunder" (1995)	"Do U Still?" (1996)	"Someone to Love" (1996)

Music video
- "Do U Still" on YouTube

"Do U Still?" is a song recorded by English boy band East 17, released on 29 January 1996 by London Records as the second single from their third album, Up All Night (1995). It was written by band member Tony Mortimer, who co-produced it with Ian Curnow, Phil Harding and Rob Kean. The song peaked at number seven on the UK Singles Chart and number eight in Ireland. The accompanying music video was directed by Russell Young.

== Critical reception ==
Victoria Segal from Melody Maker noted the song "has a chorus to snarl at every opportunity, it's a bit, aargh, UB40."Johnny Dee from NME praised the "soul pop simplicity" of the song and named it a highlight of the album.

== Music video ==
The music video for "Do U Still?" was directed by Russell Young. "Do U Still?" was shot in black and white and features the group in a large warehouse recording the song's vocals and performing to camera. The song is shown transmitting out across the airwaves illegally and being received by various members of the public. The police track the broadcast to the warehouse and raid the property but the group members have already left leaving the song to play on a loop for them.

== Track listings ==
- CD single
1. "Do U Still?" (Single Remix) – 4:18
2. "Holding On" – 5:37
3. "Holding On" (Groovin' Mix) – 4:43
- CD maxi
1. "Do U Still?" (Single Remix) - 4:18
2. "Do U Still?" (Ian Stanley Remix) - 5:53
3. "Do U Still?" (Wildchild Vocal Remix) - 8:33
4. "Do U Still?" (Wildchild Dub) - 8:16
5. "Do U Still?" (Wildchild Bonus Beat) - 6:43

== Charts ==
=== Weekly charts ===
Chart (1996)	Peak position
Australia (ARIA)	54
Belgium (Ultratop 50 Flanders)	47
Estonia (Eesti Top 20)	12
Europe (Eurochart Hot 100)	31
Europe (European AC Radio)	15
Europe (European Hit Radio)	5
Europe (Channel Crossovers)	3
France Airplay (SNEP)	50
Germany (GfK)	23
Greece (IFPI Greece)	8
Hungary (Mahasz)	8
Iceland (Íslenski Listinn Topp 40)	38
Ireland (IRMA)	8
Israel (IBA)	5
Italy Airplay (Music & Media)	13
Latvia (Latvijas Top 20)	6
Netherlands (Dutch Top 40 Tipparade)	15
Scotland (OCC)	10
Spain Airplay (Top 40 Radio)	17
Switzerland (Schweizer Hitparade)	22
UK Singles (OCC)	7
UK Airplay (Music Week)	11
UK Club Chart (Music Week)	42

=== Year-end charts ===
Chart (1996)	Position
Latvia (Latvijas Top 50)	70
