= Hold My Body Tight =

1995 single by East 17

Single by East 17

from the album Steam
- Released: 5 June 1995
- Length: 3:37
- Label: London
- Songwriters: Anthony Mortimer; Matt Rowe; Richard Stannard
- Producers: Ian Curnow; Phil Harding; Rob Kean

East 17 singles chronology
"Let It Rain" (1995)	"Hold My Body Tight" (1995)	"Thunder" (1995)

Music video
- "Hold My Body Tight" on YouTube

"Hold My Body Tight" is a song by English boyband East 17, released in June 1995 by London Records as the fifth single from their second album, Steam (1994). It was written by bandmember Tony Mortimer with Matt Rowe and Richard Stannard, and produced by Ian Curnow, Phil Harding and Rob Kean. The song is the only single from the album to miss the UK top 10, peaking at No. 12. Outside the UK, "Hold My Body Tight" did enter the top 10 hit in Ireland, Japan, and Lithuania.

== Critical reception ==
Pan-European magazine Music & Media commented, "Everybody can see that daily push-ups keep these guys fitter than any Olympic sportsman. If that's not proof enough of their stamina, check out the vitality radiating from the hot swingbeat track off Steam." Alan Jones from Music Week described it as "a softly smacking mid-tempo groove", adding that "far from their most melodic song, it is nicely harmonised, but a little bland. Definitely not the one to put them back at number one." James Hamilton from the Record Mirror Dance Update named it a "plaintive jackswing jiggler" in his Dance column. Mark Sutherland from Smash Hits gave "Hold My Body Tight" three out of five, writing, "This mildly pervy smoocher isn't actually bad, just a bit boring."

== Track listings ==
- CD maxi
1. "Hold My Body Tight" (7-inch radio edit) – 3:37
2. "Hold My Body Tight" (Tony Mortimer remix) – 3:40
3. "Hold My Body Tight" (Danny Tenaglia vocal mix) – 7:57
4. "Hold My Body Tight" (Delta house of funk mix) – 4:44
- 12-inch maxi
1. "Hold My Body Tight" (Tony Mortimer remix) – 3:40
2. "Stay Another Day" (Aphrodite mix) – 5:28
3. "Hold My Body Tight" (Danny Tenaglia vocal mix) – 7:58
4. "Hold My Body Tight" (Brian Harvey remix) – 4:16

== Charts ==
=== Weekly charts ===
Chart (1995)	Peak position
Australia (ARIA)	73
Belgium (Ultratop 50 Wallonia)	27
Europe (Eurochart Hot 100)	37
Europe (European AC Radio)	9
Europe (European Dance Radio)	6
Europe (European Hit Radio)	5
Europe (Channel Crossovers)	2
France (SNEP)	23
France Airplay (SNEP)	8
Germany (GfK)	42
Iceland (Íslenski Listinn Topp 40)	24
Ireland (IRMA)	10
Israel (IBA)	4
Italy Airplay (Music & Media)	6
Japan International (Oricon)	7
Latvia (Latvijas Top 20)	9
Lithuania (M-1)	3
Netherlands (Dutch Top 40)	35
Netherlands (Single Top 100)	20
Scottish Singles Sales (Official Charts)	16
Switzerland (Schweizer Hitparade)	28
UK Singles (Official Charts)	12
UK Airplay (Music Week)	6
UK Pop Tip Club Chart (Music Week)	13
US Dance Club Play (Billboard)	32

=== Year-end charts ===
Chart (1995)	Position
Europe (European Hit Radio)	37
Europe (Channel Crossovers)	13
Israel (IBA)	44
Italy Airplay (Music & Media)	11

== Release history ==
Region	Date	Format(s)	Label(s)	Ref.
United Kingdom	5 June 1995	CD; cassette	London	
Australia	3 July 1995	CD; cassette	London; Polydor	
Japan	7 July 1995	CD	London	
United States	29 August 1995	Rhythmic contemporary radio	London	
