= Steam (East 17 album) =

Studio album by East 17
- Released: 17 October 1994
- Recorded: 1994
- Genre: Dance pop
- Length: 41:04
- Label: London
- Producers: Phil Harding; Ian Curnow; Rob Kean; Richard Stannard

East 17 chronology
Walthamstow (1993)	Steam (1994)	Up All Night (1995)

Singles from Steam
- 1. "Around the World" Released: 2 May 1994; 2. "Steam" Released: 19 September 1994; 3. "Stay Another Day" Released: 21 November 1994; 4. "Let It Rain" Released: 13 March 1995; 5. "Hold My Body Tight" Released: 5 June 1995

Professional ratings
Review scores
Source	Rating
AllMusic	3/5 stars
The Guardian	(mixed)
Music Week	5/5 stars
NME	5/10
Smash Hits	5/5 stars

Steam is the second studio album by English boy band East 17. It was released in the UK on 17 October 1994 by London Records. The album was certified 2× Platinum in the UK.

The album spawned four UK top-10 hits, "Around the World" (No. 3), the title track (No. 7), "Let It Rain" (No. 10) and the UK Christmas No. 1, "Stay Another Day". The US version of the album added the three UK top-10 singles from their first album ("House of Love", "Deep" and "It's Alright").

== Critical reception ==
AllMusic editor Stephen Thomas Erlewine wrote, "East 17's Steam is arguably their most consistent album, featuring a non-stop attack of catchy, incessant dance/pop with strong, melodic pop hooks." Alan Jones from Music Week gave the album full score of five out of five and named it Pick of the Week, adding, "Short and taut, a 10-track delight of finely-honed pop and dance numbers. The current hit 'Steam' is actually one of the weaker cuts. Their last single 'Around the World' is also here, and practically every other song has the potential to make it as a 45'." Jordan Paramor from Smash Hits also gave the album a full score, naming it Best New Album. She said, "East 17 have just produced a dazzling second album to rival the brilliance of Walthamstow. Steam is filled with fast funky tracks along with soulful swingbeat ones. You'll skip around to 'Set Me Free' and chill out to 'Stay Another Day', a very sexy, stylish love song."

== Track listing ==
Steam track listing
No.	Title	Writer(s)	Producer(s)	Length
1.	"Steam"	Tony Mortimer, Richard Stannard, Matt Rowebottom	Stannard, Phil Harding^{[a]}, Ian Curnow^{[a]}, Rob Kean^{[a]}	3:23
2.	"Hold My Body Tight"	Mortimer, Stannard, Rowebottom	Harding, Curnow, Kean	3:51
3.	"Let It All Go"	Mortimer, Terry Coldwell, Kean, Dominic Hawken	Harding, Curnow, Kean	4:16
4.	"Set Me Free"	Mortimer	Harding, Curnow, Kean	4:47
5.	"Stay Another Day"	Mortimer, Kean, Hawken	Harding, Curnow, Kean	4:25
6.	"Around the World"	Mortimer, Brian Harvey, Rowebottom, Stannard	Stannard	4:33
7.	"Let It Rain"	Mortimer, Kean, Harding, Curnow	Harding, Curnow, Kean	4:07
8.	"Be There"	Mortimer, Kean, Hawken	Harding, Curnow, Kean	3:49
9.	"M.F. Power"	Mortimer	Harding, Curnow, Kean	3:31
10.	"Generation XTC"	Mortimer, Kean, Harding, Curnow	Harding, Curnow, Kean	4:22
Total length:				41:04

Notes

- ^{^[a]} signifies an additional producer

== Charts ==
=== Weekly charts ===
Weekly chart performance for Steam
Chart (1994–1995)	Peak position
Australian Albums (ARIA)	16
Austrian Albums (Ö3 Austria)	3
Belgian Albums (Ultratop Flanders)	7
Belgian Albums (Ultratop Wallonia)	16
Dutch Albums (Album Top 100)	12
European Albums Chart	7
Finnish Albums (Suomen virallinen lista)	23
French Albums (SNEP)	11
German Albums (Offizielle Top 100)	10
Greek Albums (IFPI Greece)	2
Hungarian Albums (MAHASZ)	17
Irish Albums (IRMA)	10
Italian Albums (FIMI)	15
Italian Albums (Musica e Dischi)	22
Norwegian Albums (VG-lista)	24
Scottish Albums (Official Charts)	3
Swedish Albums (Sverigetopplistan)	19
Swiss Albums (Schweizer Hitparade)	8
UK Albums (Official Charts)	3

=== Year-end charts ===
1994 year-end chart performance for Steam
Chart (1994)	Position
UK Albums (OCC)	10

1995 year-end chart performance for Steam
Chart (1995)	Position
Austrian Albums (Ö3 Austria)	32
Belgian Albums (Ultratop Flanders)	96
Belgian Albums (Ultratop Wallonia)	33
European Albums (Eurochart Hot 100)	28
French Albums (SNEP)	48
German Albums (Offizielle Top 100)	39
Swiss Albums (Schweizer Hitparade)	27
UK Albums (OCC)	70

== Certifications ==
Certifications and sales for Steam
Region	Certification	Certified units/sales
Australia (ARIA)	Gold	35,000^{^}
Belgium (BRMA)	Gold	25,000^{*}
France (SNEP)	2× Gold	200,000^{*}
Germany (BVMI)	Gold	250,000^{^}
Switzerland (IFPI Switzerland)	Platinum	50,000^{^}
United Kingdom (BPI)	2× Platinum	600,000^{^}
Summaries
Europe (IFPI)	Platinum	1,000,000^{*}
Worldwide	—	2,000,000
^{*} Sales figures based on certification alone.^{^} Shipments figures based on certification alone.
