= Betcha Can't Wait (East 17 song) =

1999 single by East 17

Single by E-17

from the album Resurrection
- Released: 1 March 1999
- Length: 4:12
- Label: Telstar
- Songwriters: Brian Harvey; John Hendy; Terry Coldwell; Ivor Reid; Jon Beckford; Mark Reid
- Producers: Mark Reid; Jon Beckford

E-17 singles chronology
| "Each Time" (1998) | "Betcha Can't Wait" (1999) | "Secret of My Life" (2011) |

Music video
- "Betcha Can't Wait" on YouTube

"Betcha Can't Wait" is a song recorded by English boy band East 17, released on 1 March 1999 by Telstar Records as the second and final single from their fourth album, Resurrection (1998). It was written by band members Brian Harvey, John Hendy and Terry Coldwell alongside Ivor Reid, Jon Beckford and Mark Reid and co-produced with the group by Mark Reid and Jon Beckford.

== Critical reception ==
John O'Brien from AllMusic noted that "Resurrection struggled to convince anyone of their new direction, as evident on their final single, the aimless and tuneless "Betcha Can't Wait."

== Music video ==
The music video for "Betcha Can't Wait" was directed by Nick Quested. "Betcha Can't Wait" is a continuation of the previous single "Each Time" and set in Las Vegas and the surrounding Mojave Desert. This music video also contained a "to be continued" ending, however, the band were dropped by their record label after this release with no third single materialising.

== Track listings ==
- CD single
1. "Betcha Can't Wait" (Radio Edit) – 4:12
2. "Another Time" – 4:27
3. "Betcha Can't Wait" (The Sharp Boys Club Mix Edit) – 6:36

== Charts ==
| Chart (1999) | Peak position |
|---|---|
| Europe (Eurochart Hot 100) | 54 |
| Scotland (OCC) | 32 |
| Spain Airplay (Top 40 Radio) | 34 |
| UK Singles (OCC) | 12 |
| UK Airplay (Music Week) | 49 |
