= If I Ever Fall in Love =

1992 single by Shai

Single by Shai

from the album ...If I Ever Fall in Love
- Released: September 23, 1992
- Recorded: 1992
- Genre: A cappella; R&B
- Length: 3:09
- Label: Gasoline Alley
- Songwriter: Carl "Groove" Martin
- Producer: Carl "Groove" Martin

Shai singles chronology
"If I Ever Fall in Love" (1992)	"Comforter" (1993)

Music video
- "If I Ever Fall in Love" on YouTube

"If I Ever Fall in Love" is a song by American R&B-soul quartet Shai. It was released as their debut single in September 1992 from their debut album, ...If I Ever Fall in Love (1992). The song, both written and produced by Carl "Groove" Martin, reached number two on the US Billboard Hot 100 in 1992 and peaked at number one on the Billboard Hot R&B Singles chart. It spent eight weeks at number two on the Hot 100, which at the time was the second-most number of weeks that a song held the position without topping the chart, behind Foreigner's "Waiting for a Girl Like You". The song was also their only top-40 hit in the UK, peaking at number 36.

== Critical reception ==
Paul Lester from Melody Maker declared "If I Ever Fall in Love" as "a kind of doo wop teen-love weepathon" in the mould of Boyz II Men's "End of the Road".

== Charts ==
=== Weekly charts ===
Chart (1992–1993)	Peak position
Australia (ARIA)	4
Belgium (Ultratop 50 Flanders)	21
Canada Retail Singles (The Record)	10
Canada Top Singles (RPM)	53
Europe (Eurochart Hot 100)	80
European Hit Radio (Music & Media)	22
Germany (GfK)	47
Iceland (Íslenski Listinn Topp 40)	12
Netherlands (Dutch Top 40)	8
Netherlands (Single Top 100)	11
New Zealand (Recorded Music NZ)	5
UK Singles (Official Charts)	36
UK Dance (Music Week)	37
US Billboard Hot 100	2
US Dance Singles Sales (Billboard)	4
US Hot R&B/Hip-Hop Songs (Billboard)	1
US Pop Airplay (Billboard)	5
US Rhythmic Airplay (Billboard)	1

=== Year-end charts ===
Chart (1993)	Position
Australia (ARIA)	41
Netherlands (Dutch Top 40)	69
Netherlands (Single Top 100)	67
New Zealand (RIANZ)	34
US Billboard Hot 100	7
US Hot R&B Singles (Billboard)	5
US Maxi-Singles Sales (Billboard)	49

=== Decade-end charts ===
Chart (1990–1999)	Position
US Billboard Hot 100	66

== Certifications ==
Region	Certification	Certified units/sales
Australia (ARIA)	Gold	35,000^{^}
United States (RIAA)	Platinum	1,000,000^{^}
^{^} Shipments figures based on certification alone.

== Release history ==
Region	Date	Format(s)	Label(s)	Ref.
United States	September 23, 1992	—N/a	Gasoline Alley	
Australia	December 14, 1992	12-inch vinyl; CD; cassette	Gasoline Alley	
Japan	December 23, 1992	Mini-CD	Gasoline Alley	

== East 17 and Gabrielle version ==
"If You Ever"

Single by East 17 featuring Gabrielle

from the album Around the World (the Journey So Far) and Gabrielle
- Released: October 21, 1996
- Length: 4:15
- Label: London
- Songwriter: Carl Martin
- Producers: Mike Rose; Nicholas Foster

East 17 singles chronology
"Someone to Love" (1996)	"If You Ever" (1996)	"Hey Child" (1997)

Gabrielle singles chronology
"If You Really Cared" (1996)	"If You Ever" (1996)	"Walk On By" (1997)

Music video
- "If You Ever" on YouTube

"If I Ever Fall in Love" was covered in 1996 as a duet between British boy band East 17 and singer-songwriter Gabrielle, completed with a backing track. Renamed "If You Ever" and released by London Records, the cover peaked at number two on the UK Singles Chart and also peaked within the top 10 of the charts in Ireland and Sweden. The song received a platinum certification from the British Phonographic Industry in September 2019 for sales and streams exceeding 600,000.

The song was the first single from East 17's first Greatest Hits compilation, Around the World Hit Singles: The Journey So Far (1996), and was also the fourth single from Gabrielle's second self-titled album (1996). It was the highest-charting single from both aforementioned albums.

=== Critical reception ===
Kristy Barker from Melody Maker complimented "If You Ever" as "gorgeous" and "lovely". Kevin Courtney from Irish Times wrote, "The Walthamstow wideboys and the pirate patched soul queen team up for this fairly run of the mill ballad [...]. At least it's a more appropriate pairing than Lulu and Take That [on "Relight My Fire"]. On the sleeve art, the numeral 17 has been replaced by the spelled out version, perhaps a sign that the Easties are making a subtle bid for a more "mature" audience. Why not go all the way and change their name to East Thirtysomething?"

=== Track listings ===
- UK CD1 and Japanese CD single
1. "If You Ever" (Smoove 7-inch mix)
2. "If You Ever" (Ruff mix)
3. "Deep" (live at Wembley Arena, 28 May 1995)
4. "Steam" (live)
- UK CD2
1. "If You Ever" (Smoove 7-inch mix)
2. "Stay Another Day" (live)
3. "Around the World" (live)
4. "It's Alright" (live)
- UK cassette single and European CD single
1. "If You Ever" (Smoove 7-inch mix)
2. "If You Ever" (Simple Simon's Pieman remix)

=== Charts ===
==== Weekly charts ====
Chart (1996–1997)	Peak position
Belgium (Ultratip Bubbling Under Flanders)	11
Belgium (Ultratop 50 Wallonia)	35
Estonia (Eesti Top 20)	3
Estonia Airplay (Eesti Top 25)	8
Europe (Eurochart Hot 100)	15
Europe (European AC Radio)	11
Europe (European Hit Radio)	3
Europe (Channel Crossovers)	4
France (SNEP)	19
France Airplay (SNEP)	16
Germany (GfK)	31
Greece (IFPI Greece)	3
Iceland (Íslenski Listinn Topp 40)	30
Ireland (IRMA)	4
Israel (IBA)	7
Italy Airplay (Music & Media)	20
Japan International (Oricon)	24
Latvia (Latvijas Top 20)	4
Lithuania (M-1)	4
Netherlands (Dutch Top 40)	38
Netherlands (Single Top 100)	38
Scottish Singles Sales (Official Charts)	3
Spain Airplay (Top 40 Radio)	37
Sweden (Sverigetopplistan)	5
Switzerland (Schweizer Hitparade)	20
UK Singles (Official Charts)	2
UK Airplay (Music Week)	1

==== Year-end charts ====
Chart (1996)	Position
Israel (IBA)	27
Latvia (Latvijas Top 50)	72
Sweden (Topplistan)	28
UK Singles (OCC)	18
UK Airplay (Music Week)	31

Chart (1997)	Position
Romania (Romanian Top 100)	68

=== Certifications ===
Region	Certification	Certified units/sales
United Kingdom (BPI)	Platinum	600,000^{‡}
^{‡} Sales+streaming figures based on certification alone.

=== Release history ===
Region	Date	Format(s)	Label(s)	Ref.
United Kingdom	October 21, 1996	CD; cassette	London	
Japan	November 25, 1996	CD	London	
