= Comforter (song) =

Single by Shai

from the album ...If I Ever Fall in Love
- Released: January 19, 1993
- Recorded: 1992
- Genre: R&B
- Length: 4:11
- Label: Gasoline Alley/MCA
- Songwriter(s): Carl "Groove" Martin; Darnell Van Rensalier; Marc Gay
- Producer(s): Carl "Groove" Martin

Shai singles chronology
| "If I Ever Fall in Love" (1992) | "Comforter" (1993) | "Baby I'm Yours" (1993) |

Music video
- "Comforter" on YouTube

"Comforter" is a song by American vocal R&B/soul quartet Shai, issued in January 1993 as the second single from their debut studio album ...If I Ever Fall in Love (1992). The song was written by group members Carl Martin, Darnell Van Rensalier and Marc Gay, with Martin also handling production. The song peaked at number 10 on the US Billboard Hot 100 and was certified gold on July 28, 1993 for sales of 500,000 copies.

== Music video ==
The official music video for the song was directed by Ian Fletcher.

== Charts ==
=== Weekly charts ===
| Chart (1993) | Peak position |
|---|---|
| US Billboard Hot 100 | 10 |
| US Hot R&B/Hip-Hop Songs (Billboard) | 4 |
| US Pop Airplay (Billboard) | 31 |
| US Rhythmic (Billboard) | 3 |

=== Year-end charts ===
| Chart (1993) | Position |
|---|---|
| US Billboard Hot 100 | 48 |
| US Hot R&B/Hip-Hop Songs (Billboard) | 21 |
| US Cash Box Top 100 | 38 |
