= Let It Rain (East 17 song) =

1995 single by East 17

Single by East 17

from the album Steam
- Released: 13 March 1995
- Genre: Techno; gospel
- Length: 3:32
- Label: London
- Songwriters: Ian Curnow; Phil Harding; Rob Kean; Anthony Mortimer
- Producers: Ian Curnow; Phil Harding; Rob Kean

East 17 singles chronology
"Stay Another Day" (1994)	"Let It Rain" (1995)	"Hold My Body Tight" (1995)

Music video
- "Let It Rain" on YouTube

"Let It Rain" is a song by English pop boy band East 17, released on 13 March 1995 by London Records as the fourth single from their second album, Steam (1994). It was written by bandmember Tony Mortimer along with producers Ian Curnow, Phil Harding and Rob Kean. The song reached number one in Lithuania and entered the top 10 in Finland, Ireland and the UK.

== Critical reception ==
Caroline Sullivan from The Guardian named the song an "unpretentious dancefloor sparkler". In his weekly UK chart commentary, James Masterton wrote that 'Let It Rain' "turns back to the harder dance sound that typifies much of their output and sounds in places like a distant relation of their first hit 'House of Love' back in September 1992." Dave Simpson from Melody Maker commented, "E17 go from strewth (poncy ballads) to strength. 'Let It Rain' is their finest since 'Everybody in the House of Love'. An uplifting blend of euphoria, electronics and existential introspection, it's not that unlike mid-period ('Shellshock') New Order." Another Melody Maker editor, Victoria Segal, noted its "hysteric gospel". Music Week gave it a score of four out of five, calling it "a more upbeat, but equally commercial, follow-up to the band's Christmas number one is in remixed form, ensuring interest from even Steam-owning fans." The reviewer added, "It will no doubt be boosted by the lads' Brits performance last week."

Music Week editor, Alan Jones, deemed it "preposterous". John Robinson from NME said, "Needless to say, East 17 instruct the heavens to open and pour love upon us." He noted that it "duly arrives by way of a tumultuous chorus". James Hamilton from the Record Mirror Dance Update described it as a "'love rain down on me' chorused rap [track]" in his weekly dance column. Pete Stanton from Smash Hits gave it three out of five, writing, "It's as fast as 'Steam', if not faster, starts with a thunderstorm noise and ends with a thunderstorm noise and Brian belts out a stonking rap, while someone chants Love every now and then. It's nothing new and won't be their second number one, but because every-one, including your Auntie Edith, loves 'em, it should still do well."

== Music video ==
The accompanying music video for "Let It Rain" begins with East 17 arriving by helicopter. Then they are transported by jeeps to a warehouse where the band performs on a stage with dancers. In the background, the rain pours down. At the end, all the members of East 17 are back in the helicopter that takes them away. The video was a Box Top on British music television channel The Box in April 1995. It received active rotation on MTV Europe and was B-listed on Germany's VIVA in May 1995. "Let It Rain" was later made available on YouTube in 2017 by London Records, and had generated almost five million views as of late 2025.

== Track listings ==
- CD and 7-inch single
1. "Let It Rain" (Thunder radio edit) – 3:32
2. "Let It Rain" (J-Pac Sleeting edit) – 3:33
- CD maxi
1. "Let It Rain" (Thunder radio edit) – 3:32
2. "Let It Rain" (Overworld Storm edit) – 3:46
3. "Let It Rain" (J-Pac sleeting remix) – 5:35
4. "Let It Rain" (Overworld Storm mix) – 6:40
- 12-inch maxi
1. "Let It Rain" (City of Love club mix) – 6:33
2. "Let It Rain" (City of Love instrumental mix) – 6:33
3. "Let It Rain" (City of Love radio edit) – 3:34
4. "Let It Rain" (Fritz 12-inch mix) – 4:39
5. "Let It Rain" (Fritz edit) – 3:51

== Credits ==
- Written by Harding/Curnow, Kean and Mortimer
- Engineered by Dillon Gallagher and Phil Harding
- Mixed and produced by Phil Harding and Ian Curnow and Rob Kean
- Artwork by Form
- Photography by Lawrence Watson

== Charts ==
=== Weekly charts ===
Chart (1995)	Peak position
Australia (ARIA)	12
Belgium (Ultratop 50 Wallonia)	31
Canada Top Singles (RPM)	79
Canada Dance/Urban (RPM)	20
Europe (Eurochart Hot 100)	21
Europe (European Dance Radio)	24
Europe (European Hit Radio)	21
Europe (Channel Crossovers)	16
Finland (Suomen virallinen lista)	10
France (SNEP)	21
France Airplay (SNEP)	13
Germany (GfK)	26
Greece (IFPI Greece)	3
Iceland (Íslenski Listinn Topp 40)	32
Ireland (IRMA)	5
Israel (IBA)	1
Latvia (Latvijas Top 20)	5
Lithuania (M-1)	1
Netherlands (Dutch Top 40)	27
Netherlands (Single Top 100)	16
Norway (VG-lista)	18
Scottish Singles Sales (Official Charts)	11
Sweden (Sverigetopplistan)	33
Switzerland (Schweizer Hitparade)	25
UK Singles (Official Charts)	10
UK Airplay (Music Week)	14
UK Pop Tip Club Chart (Music Week)	3

=== Year-end charts ===
Chart (1995)	Position
Israel (IBA)	45
Latvia (Latvijas Top 50)	65

== Release history ==
Region	Date	Format(s)	Label(s)	Ref.
United Kingdom	13 March 1995	CD; cassette	London	
Australia	3 April 1995	CD; cassette	London	
