= Around the World (East 17 song) =

1994 single by East 17

Single by East 17

from the album Steam
- Released: 2 May 1994
- Length: 4:37
- Label: London
- Songwriters: Brian Harvey; Tony Mortimer; Matt Rowe; Richard Stannard
- Producer: Richard Stannard

East 17 singles chronology
"It's Alright" (1993)	"Around the World" (1994)	"Steam" (1994)

Music video
- "Around the World" on YouTube

"Around the World" is a song by English boy band East 17. Written by band members Brian Harvey and Tony Mortimer with Matt Rowe and Richard Stannard, and produced by the latter, it was released on 2 May 1994 by London Records as the lead single from the band's second album, Steam (1994). The song became their fourth top-10 hit in the United Kingdom, charting at number three on the UK Singles Chart. It was a number-one hit in Israel, and a top-10 hit also in Australia, Denmark, Finland, Ireland, Lithuania, the Netherlands, and Zimbabwe. The accompanying music video for "Around the World" was directed by Katie Bell.

== Critical reception ==
In his weekly UK chart commentary, James Masterton wrote that on the song, "[The band is] returning to the slick dancefloor balladry that first brought them to the Top 5 in the shape of 'Deep'. From here they can clearly only go from strength to strength." Victoria Segal from Melody Maker remarked "that piano". Pan-European magazine Music & Media commented, "East 17 has got the Walthamstow blues. The teen stars with street credibility can be "softies" too, suffering from homesickness while touring abroad as we learn from this ballad." Alan Jones from Music Week gave "All Around the World" a score of four out of five, viewing it as "a polished, shuffling vehicle for the usual East 17 posturing and trademark touches, with a slow rap to the fore and a subtle melody, Just what fans ordered, in fact."

Stuart Bailie from NME wrote, "The new record would also suggest that East 17 are getting soft — a sappy tour bus ballad about how your soul can only truly feel at rest in Walthamstow." Leesa Daniels from Smash Hits gave "All Around the World" a top score of five out of five and named it Best New Single, praising it as "incredible". She added, "Tony and Co have come up with a stunningly gorgeous record that has the slow, funky vibes that made 'Deep' such a brilliant song. Never, ever has a single deserved to be number one as much as this one does. This proves once and for all that East 17 are, musically, the best band in Britain. Amen."

== Music video ==
The music video for "Around the World" was directed by Katie Bell and released in May 1994. It shows the band performing underground and also in a forest. In between a female dancer appears, wearing a hat and dressed as the globe. The video received heavy rotation on MTV Europe and was A-listed on Germany's VIVA in June/July 1994. On British The Box, it was a Box Top in June.

== Charts ==
=== Weekly charts ===
Chart (1994)	Peak position
Australia (ARIA)	4
Austria (Ö3 Austria Top 40)	29
Belgium (Ultratop 50 Flanders)	37
Denmark (IFPI)	6
Europe (Eurochart Hot 100)	7
Europe (European AC Radio)	19
Europe (European Hit Radio)	5
Europe (Channel Crossovers)	4
Finland (Suomen virallinen lista)	7
Germany (GfK)	15
Greece (IFPI Greece)	2
Iceland (Íslenski Listinn Topp 40)	12
Ireland (IRMA)	4
Israel (Israeli Singles Chart)	1
Italy (Musica e dischi)	23
Lithuania (M-1)	6
Netherlands (Dutch Top 40)	10
Netherlands (Single Top 100)	14
New Zealand (Recorded Music NZ)	22
Scottish Singles Sales (Official Charts)	5
Spain Airplay (Top 40 Radio)	14
Sweden (Sverigetopplistan)	23
Switzerland (Schweizer Hitparade)	16
UK Singles (Official Charts)	3
UK Airplay (Music Week)	3
UK Club Chart (Music Week)	19
Zimbabwe (ZIMA)	7

=== Year-end charts ===
Chart (1994)	Position
Australia (ARIA)	64
Europe (Eurochart Hot 100)	67
Europe (Channel Crossovers)	14
Germany (Media Control)	72
Israel (Israeli Singles Chart)	16
Netherlands (Single Top 100)	95
UK Singles (OCC)	39
UK Airplay (Music Week)	18

== Certifications ==
Region	Certification	Certified units/sales
Australia (ARIA)	Gold	35,000^{^}
United Kingdom (BPI)	Silver	200,000^{^}
^{^} Shipments figures based on certification alone.

== Release history ==
Region	Date	Format(s)	Label(s)	Ref.
United Kingdom	2 May 1994	CD; cassette	London	
Australia	30 May 1994	CD; cassette	London; Polydor	
Japan	25 June 1994	Mini-CD	London	
