= Stay Another Day =

1994 single by British boy-band East 17

Single by East 17

from the album Steam
- Released: 21 November 1994
- Genre: Pop
- Length: 4:29
- Label: London
- Songwriters: Tony Mortimer; Rob Kean; Dominic Hawken
- Producers: Phil Harding; Ian Curnow

East 17 singles chronology
| "Steam" (1994) | "Stay Another Day" (1994) | "Let It Rain" (1995) |

Music video
- "Stay Another Day" on YouTube

"Stay Another Day" is a song recorded by British boy band East 17, released on 21 November 1994 by London Records as the third single from their second album, Steam (1994). The song was written by band member Tony Mortimer with Rob Kean and Dominic Hawken, and produced by Phil Harding and Ian Curnow. It is the band's only number-one song on the UK singles chart, becoming the Christmas number one of 1994. "Stay Another Day" topped the charts in 15 countries, including Denmark, Ireland, Israel, Sweden, and Zimbabwe and peaked within the top 10 in several others including Australia, France, and the Netherlands. Two different music videos were produced for the song.

== Background ==
"Stay Another Day" was the third single from East 17's second album, Steam, following up "Around the World" and the album's title track. It was their first ballad, written by the band's lead songwriter Tony Mortimer about the suicide of his brother Ollie. Mortimer explained:

It was based on my brother's suicide and losing someone. What would you do if you had one more day with a loved one?... It was all based on conversations I'd had with my brother and I was trying to change it into a love song about the end of a relationship.

Mortimer was aided in the composition by his co-manager Rob Kean and songwriter Dominic Hawken, who had once been Boy George's keyboard player. Christmas bells were included towards the end of the song to appeal to the lucrative Christmas singles market. The most familiar arrangement is unusual among pop records in that it uses almost no drums, save for timpani rolls during the introduction and towards the end of the track.

== Reception ==
=== Commercial reception ===
In late November 1994, "Stay Another Day" entered at number seven on the UK Singles Chart. The following week it climbed to its peak of number one. For the last three weeks of the year, "Stay Another Day" faced stiff competition for the 1994 Christmas number-one from the popular Mariah Carey single "All I Want for Christmas Is You". It outsold Carey's hit single for the weeks commencing 11, 18 and 25 December, selling roughly 130,000, 120,000 and 160,000 copies respectively. The sales lead over Carey in the week before Christmas was around 60,000, and thus securing 1994's Christmas number one to East 17.

It was the 3rd biggest selling boy band single of the 1990s in the United Kingdom and 35th overall of the decade. As of December 2024, the single has current UK sales of 1.6 million.

Tony Mortimer won an Ivor Novello songwriting award for this song. The single was also nominated for 'Best Single' at the 1995 Brit Awards.

"Stay Another Day" was not released as a single in the United States but did receive limited Christmas-time airplay on KYSR-FM "Star 98.7" in Los Angeles in 1996, owing to the market's influence and exposure to international hit singles. After its success in the UK it went on to become a major hit all over Europe and internationally, topping the charts in fifteen countries across Europe, Asia, and Africa as well as reaching the Top 3 in Australia.

In the decades following release the song has become a belated discovery in North America (it wasn't promoted or released in either North or South America) appearing on multiple Christmas playlists, both corporate and consumer, and contributing to the song's yearly 20 million streams. American alternative rock musician Courtney Love publicly stated that she is a fan of the song and that it makes her Christmas playlist every year.

=== Critical reception ===
The song received largely positive reviews from critics. Ross Jones from The Guardian felt that "teen-town's hard men show their soft side on a Christmas number one contender" and "a beautiful thing". In his weekly UK chart commentary, James Masterton noted, "East 17 prove that there is more to them than the usual 'bad boy' image and sing in astonishingly perfect harmony to create what is certain to be one of the biggest seasonal successes, especially when you consider they were a fixture of the Christmas charts last year with 'Its Alright'." Pan-European magazine Music & Media wrote, "Like anybody else the Walthamstow posse knows that this time of the year is reserved for woeful ballads. The "less sad", "even more sad" and "not so sad" remixes, however, have a club spirit." Alan Jones from Music Week gave the song a top score of five out of five and named it Pick of the Week, writing, "This exquisitely arranged, close harmony ballad, piano-led and draped with strings, is a hot favourite for the Christmas number one but may fail by being released a tad too early. East 17's most accomplished piece of work yet, and a song that will be played in years to come, long after Steam has evaporated." Jordan Paramor from Smash Hits viewed it as "a very sexy, stylish love song." Sunday Mirror commented, "A tinkling piano, a gorgeous melody, a sweet and soulful lead vocal those little devils East 17 have gone all angelic for Christmas. The result, a slow and lovelorn ballad called 'Stay Another Day'".

== Music videos ==
Two music videos were made for the song. One video features the band recording and performing the song in a studio. The other video features the band in a black background. The group are seen wearing white fur trimmed parkas and black leather jackets. A woman wearing a dress and veil also appears whilst it snows. The latter video is shown usually around Christmas, while the first version is shown outside Christmas. The black-and-white video version was made available on YouTube in 2017.

== Legacy ==
British newspaper The Guardian ranked "Stay Another Day" number 41 in their list of "The 100 greatest UK No 1s" in 2020. Ben Beaumont-Thomas wrote:

One of the greatest Christmas No 1s of all time is a triumph of emotional candour. It resembles a breakup song with its talk of final kisses, but was written by Tony Mortimer after his brother killed himself. The pain of those sudden calls of 'stay now' is so acute, voicing the suddenness of loss.

The song has featured on Christmas compilation albums and is usually a mainstay on radio during the festive period. However, scepticism remains within the British public as to whether the song should be labelled a Christmas song. In December 2017, YouGov carried out a poll asking the British public whether they agreed if "Stay Another Day" is a Christmas song. Just over one third, or 34% disagreed, while 29% agreed. This left a large proportion of 37% in the don't know category, which includes all of those who were unaware of the song.

According to analysis of PRS for Music figures, it was estimated that the song generates £97,000 of royalties per year.

== Track listings ==
- CD single
1. "Stay Another Day" (S.A.D. mix) – 4:29
2. "Stay Another Day" (less sad mix) – 4:42
3. "Stay Another Day" (more sad mix) – 8:34
4. "Stay Another Day" (not so sad mix) – 6:16

== Charts ==
=== Weekly charts ===
| Chart (1994–1995) | Peak position |
|---|---|
| Australia (ARIA) | 3 |
| Austria (Ö3 Austria Top 40) | 2 |
| Belgium (Ultratop 50 Flanders) | 3 |
| Belgium (Ultratop 50 Wallonia) | 2 |
| Denmark (IFPI) | 1 |
| Europe (Eurochart Hot 100) | 2 |
| Europe (European AC Radio) | 2 |
| Europe (European Dance Radio) | 3 |
| Europe (European Hit Radio) | 1 |
| Europe (Channel Crossovers) | 1 |
| Finland (Suomen virallinen lista) | 15 |
| France (SNEP) | 7 |
| France Airplay (SNEP) | 5 |
| Germany (GfK) | 4 |
| Greece (IFPI Greece) | 1 |
| Iceland (Íslenski Listinn Topp 40) | 15 |
| Ireland (IRMA) | 1 |
| Israel (Israeli Singles Chart) | 1 |
| Italy (Musica e dischi) | 21 |
| Italy Airplay (Music & Media) | 5 |
| Japan (Oricon) | 70 |
| Latvia (Latvijas Top 20) | 1 |
| Lithuania (M-1) | 1 |
| Macedonia (IFPI) | 1 |
| Netherlands (Dutch Top 40) | 6 |
| Netherlands (Single Top 100) | 5 |
| Netherlands Airplay (Music & Media) | 4 |
| Norway (VG-lista) | 2 |
| Poland Airplay (Music & Media) | 2 |
| Scottish Singles Sales (Official Charts) | 1 |
| Spain Airplay (Top 40 Radio) | 7 |
| Sweden (Sverigetopplistan) | 1 |
| Switzerland (Schweizer Hitparade) | 2 |
| UK Singles (Official Charts) | 1 |
| UK Airplay (Music Week) | 1 |
| UK Club Chart (Music Week) | 58 |
| Zimbabwe (ZIMA) | 1 |

| Chart (2019-2025) | Peak position |
|---|---|
| UK Singles (OCC) | 35 |
| UK Physical Singles (OCC) | 6 |
| UK Singles Downloads (Official Charts) | 39 |
| UK Singles Sales (OCC) | 11 |
| UK Streaming Chart (OCC) | 25 |
| UK Vinyl Singles Chart (OCC) | 3 |

=== Year-end charts ===
| Chart (1994) | Position |
|---|---|
| Europe (Eurochart Hot 100) | 87 |
| Latvia (Latvijas Top 50) | 33 |
| Sweden (Topplistan) | 87 |
| UK Singles (OCC) | 3 |

| Chart (1995) | Position |
|---|---|
| Australia (ARIA) | 28 |
| Austria (Ö3 Austria Top 40) | 14 |
| Belgium (Ultratop 50 Flanders) | 41 |
| Belgium (Ultratop 50 Wallonia) | 27 |
| Europe (Eurochart Hot 100) | 18 |
| Europe (European Hit Radio) | 26 |
| France (SNEP) | 57 |
| France Airplay (SNEP) | 40 |
| Germany (Media Control) | 36 |
| Israel (Israeli Singles Chart) | 4 |
| Latvia (Latvijas Top 50) | 3 |
| Netherlands (Dutch Top 40) | 51 |
| Netherlands (Single Top 100) | 48 |
| Norway (VG-lista) | 4 |
| Sweden (Topplistan) | 12 |
| Switzerland (Schweizer Hitparade) | 17 |

=== Decade-end charts ===
| Chart (1990–1999) | Position |
|---|---|
| Ireland (IRMA) | 91 |
| UK Singles (OCC) | 32 |

== Certifications ==
| Region | Certification | Certified units/sales |
|---|---|---|
| Australia (ARIA) | Gold | 35,000^{^} |
| Austria (IFPI Austria) | Gold | 25,000^{*} |
| Germany (BVMI) | Gold | 250,000^{^} |
| Sweden (GLF) | Gold | 25,000^{^} |
| Switzerland (IFPI Switzerland) | Gold | 25,000^{^} |
| United Kingdom (BPI) | 3× Platinum | 1,800,000^{‡} |
^{*} Sales figures based on certification alone.^{^} Shipments figures based on certification alone.^{‡} Sales+streaming figures based on certification alone.

== Release history ==
| Region | Date | Format(s) | Label(s) | Ref. |
|---|---|---|---|---|
| United Kingdom | 21 November 1994 | 7-inch vinyl; CD; cassette | London | |
| Australia | 5 December 1994 | CD; cassette | London | |
| Japan | 19 December 1994 | CD | London | |
| United States | 28 November 1995 | Rhythmic contemporary; contemporary hit radio | London | |

== Girls Aloud version ==
"Stay Another Day"

Song by Girls Aloud
- A-side: "Sound of the Underground"
- Released: 16 December 2002
- Genre: Pop
- Length: 4:24
- Label: Polydor
- Songwriters: Tony Mortimer; Rob Kean; Dominic Hawken
- Producers: Andrew Ian Murray; Christian Ballard; Denis Ingoldsby

=== Background ===
Girls Aloud were formed through Popstars: The Rivals by a public vote on 30 November 2002. The concept of the programme was to produce a boyband and a girlband who would be "rivals" and compete for the Christmas number one single in 2002. Girls Aloud competed against One True Voice, managed by music producer Pete Waterman. Girls Aloud recorded a cover version of "Stay Another Day", intended as their debut single, with Cheryl Cole providing lead vocals. After Girls Aloud recorded "Sound of the Underground", "Stay Another Day" was instead released as its B-side. The release was originally meant to be a double A-side, and it is often mistakenly labelled as such. "Stay Another Day" was performed on This Morning, Top of the Pops and Top of the Pops Saturday to promote its parent single. Backing vocals were provided by Easther Bennett of fellow UK Girl-group Eternal.

Girls Aloud gave the song a "romantic slant," which surprised East 17's Mortimer since it is about his brother's suicide. Mortimer insisted that he loves Girls Aloud, but said, "I found it really odd they were singing a song about my dead brother. It should've been left alone for a few years."

=== Reception ===
Colin Paterson of The Guardian remarked on the unoriginality of Girls Aloud's cover: "A group formed on a TV show by a phone poll and then doing a cover of a former Christmas No 1. Life seldom gets less imaginative."

== Waltham Forest Youth Choir version ==
On 3 December 2019, London Recordings uploaded a new version of the song to YouTube, performed by Waltham Forest Youth Choir, with Mortimer on piano. Mortimer himself appears in the video. The track was released to raise money for mental health charity CALM.

== Jorja Smith version ==
"Stay Another Day"

Single by Jorja Smith
- Released: 9 November 2023
- Genre: Pop
- Length: 2:42
- Label: FAMM
- Songwriters: Tony Mortimer; Rob Kean; Dominic Hawken

"Stay Another Day" was covered in 2023 by British singer Jorja Smith as part of the Amazon Music Originals series. It was released on 9 November 2023. "Stay Another Day" debuted at number 3 on the UK's Official Trending Chart.

=== Charts ===
| Chart (2023) | Peak position |
|---|---|
| UK Singles (Official Charts) | 16 |
| UK Indie (Official Charts) | 2 |

== Charity re-releases ==
Mortimer has re-recorded Stay Another Day on several occasions, with the re-released singles being used to fundraise for charity.

=== 2019 version ===
On 3 December 2019, London Recordings uploaded a new version of the song to YouTube, performed by Waltham Forest Youth Choir, accompanied by Mortimer on piano. Mortimer himself appears in the video. The collaboration was formed as part of the celebrations of the Waltham Forest London Borough of Culture initiative, and the track was released to raise money for mental health charity Campaign Against Living Miserably (CALM).

=== 2024 version ===
On 13 December 2024, Mortimer performed a version of the song on piano at London St Pancras railway station while being accompanied by the London Community Choir. The event was to mark the 30th anniversary of "Stay Another Day" and to promote the re-release of the single. The song was published on ice clear 7” vinyl and featured new artwork and a previously unreleased live version of the song from East 17’s 1995 ‘Letting Off Steam’ arena tour.

The band also released merchandising to promote the anniversary, including a Christmas tree bauble featuring four Lego figures dressed in replicas of the band’s iconic white parka jackets from the original music video and an East 17 Christmas card was available exclusively through Card Factory.

Money from the sale of the vinyl record and related merchandising was used to raise funds for Nordoff and Robbins – the UK’s largest music therapy charity.
