= Steam (East 17 song) =

1994 single by East 17

Single by East 17

from the album Steam
- Released: 19 September 1994
- Genre: Dance-pop; new jack swing; pop rap
- Length: 3:25
- Label: London
- Songwriters: Tony Mortimer; Matt Rowe; Richard Stannard
- Producers: Matt Rowe; Richard Stannard

East 17 singles chronology
"Around the World" (1994)	"Steam" (1994)	"Stay Another Day" (1994)

Music video
- "Steam" on YouTube

"Steam" is a song by English pop boy band East 17, released on 19 September 1994, by London Records, as the second single from their second album by the same name (1994). The song was written by band member Tony Mortimer with its producers, Matt Rowe and Richard Stannard. It was a major hit in Europe, peaking at number six in Portugal, number seven in the UK and number eight in Scotland, while becoming a top-20 hit in Australia, Denmark, Finland, Italy, the Netherlands and Switzerland. In the UK, the Carter USM remix of the song was featured heavily on Radio 1's alternative evening show. The accompanying music video was directed by Kevin Godley, featuring the band performing onstage at a concert. "Steam" was nominated in the category for Best Single at the 1995 Smash Hits Awards.

== Critical reception ==
In his weekly UK chart commentary, James Masterton said, "Whilst the last single was in truth a little wimpy 'Steam' cranks up the pace and marks a return to the white-boy pop/rap the band have carved a niche for themselves with." Victoria Segal from Melody Maker named it a "pop spectacular", noting its "Gett Off" rip-off. Pan-European magazine Music & Media wrote, "Street cred they've always had, more than all their competitors combined, but even with a Carter USM remix to their account, it's a proven fact that these lads have grown up."

Alan Jones from Music Week gave "Steam" a score of four out of five and named it Single of the Week, adding, "Rock guitars and whistling are just two elements of this introductory jackswing-style single from the forthcoming East 17 album. Far from their best, but they have enough impetus to score Top 10 hits at will." Iestyn George from NME commented, "A sweaty swingbeat vibe prevails on 'Steam', coupled with a natty whistling riff that'll annoy the f— out of Credit to the Nation fans. Naturally, it is ACE and will be Number One for 16 weeks." Female pop-punk music duo Shampoo reviewed the song for Smash Hits, naming it Best New Single.

== Music video ==
A music video was produced to promote the single, featuring the band performing at a concert, and was directed by English singer, songwriter, musician and music video director Kevin Godley. Peter Sinclair directed photography and Nicci Power produced. The video is interspersed with close-up footage of people in the audience, shot in black-and-white. "Steam" received active rotation on MTV Europe and was B-listed on both French and German music television channels MCM and VIVA from October to December 1994. The video was later made available by London Records on YouTube in 2017 and had generated more than 1.2 million views as of late 2025 on the platform.

== Track listings ==
- 12", UK (1994)
1. "Steam" (Overworld Haze Mix)
2. "Steam" (Man City Mix)
3. "Steam" (P. & C Mix)
- CD single, Europe (1994)
1. "Steam" (Vapoureyes Mix) — 3:25
2. "Steam" (Carter USM SW2 Mix) — 3:58
- CD single, UK & Europe (1994)
1. "Steam" (Vapoureyes Mix) — 3:24
2. "Steam" (Carter USM SW2 Mix) — 4:00
3. "Deep" (Delta Steam House Of Funk Mix) — 4:24
4. "Steam" (Overworld Haze Dub) — 6:50
- CD single, France (1994)
1. "Steam" (Vapoureyes Mix) — 3:25
2. "Steam" (Carter USM SW2 Mix) — 3:58
- CD maxi, Australia (1995)
1. "Steam" (Vapoureyes Mix) — 3:24
2. "Steam" (Carter USM SW2 Mix) — 4:00
3. "Steam" (Overworld Heat Mix) — 5:59
4. "Steam" (P + C No. 2 Mix) — 7:34
- Cassette single, UK & Europe (1994)
1. "Steam" (Vapoureyes Mix) — 3:24
2. "Steam" (Carter USM SW2 Mix) — 4:00

== Charts ==
=== Weekly charts ===
Chart (1994)	Peak position
Australia (ARIA)	18
Austria (Ö3 Austria Top 40)	28
Belgium (Ultratop 50 Flanders)	28
Denmark (IFPI)	12
Europe (Eurochart Hot 100)	17
Europe (European Hit Radio)	17
Europe (Channel Crossovers)	6
Finland (Suomen virallinen lista)	12
France (SNEP)	46
France Airplay (SNEP)	55
Germany (GfK)	23
Greece (IFPI Greece)	4
Ireland (IRMA)	6
Israel (IBA)	2
Italy (Musica e dischi)	19
Lithuania (M-1)	4
Netherlands (Dutch Top 40)	16
Netherlands (Single Top 100)	13
Scottish Singles Sales (Official Charts)	8
Sweden (Sverigetopplistan)	34
Switzerland (Schweizer Hitparade)	12
UK Singles (Official Charts)	7
UK Airplay (Music Week)	17
UK Club Chart (Music Week)	50

=== Year-end charts ===
Chart (1994)	Position
Israel (IBA)	29
UK Singles (OCC)	78

== Release history ==
Region	Date	Format(s)	Label(s)	Ref.
United Kingdom	19 September 1994	7-inch vinyl; CD; cassette	London	
Japan	2 November 1994	CD	London	
