= East 17 =

English boy band

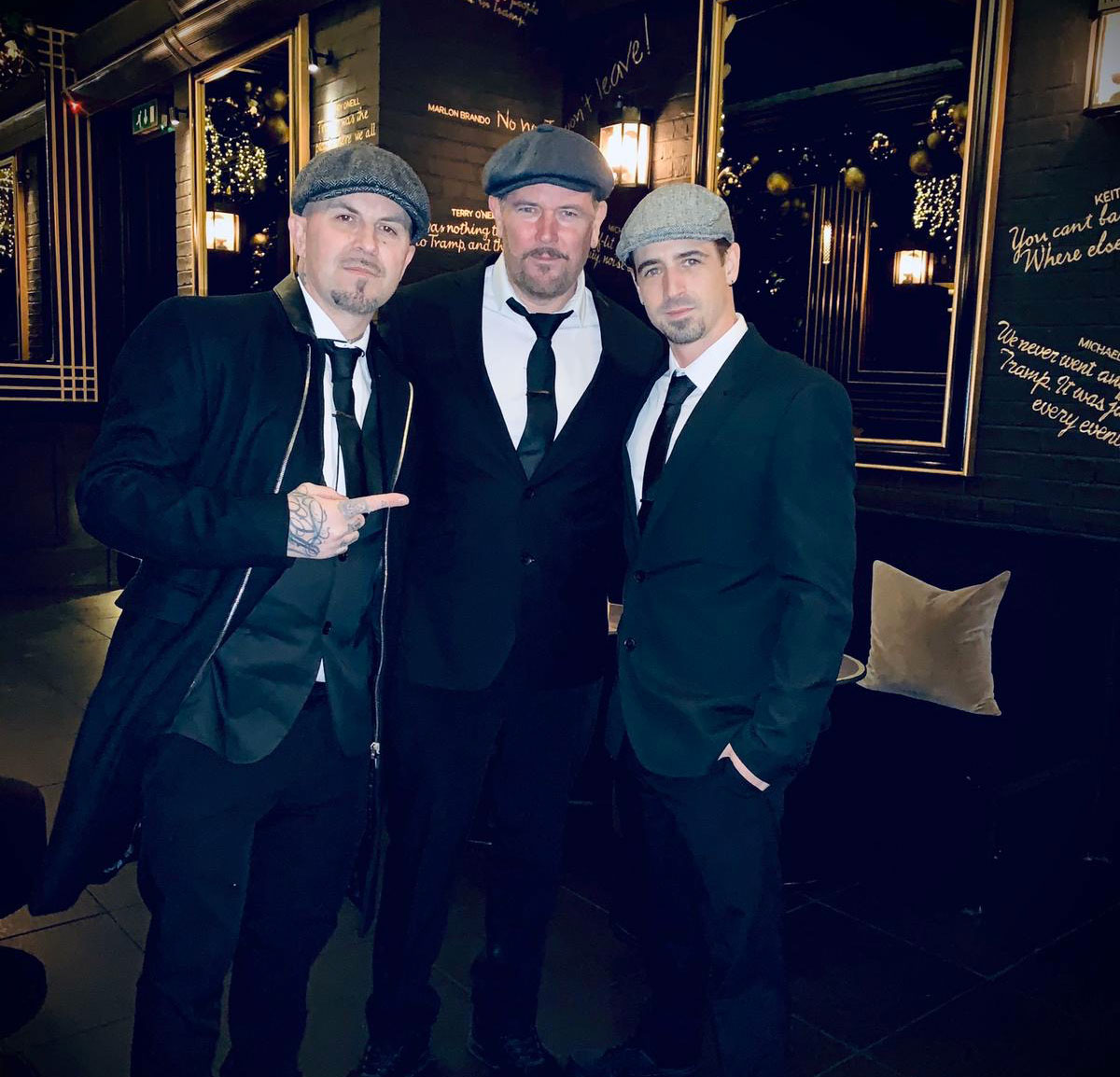
- East 17 in 2019

Background information
- Also known as: E-17 (1998–1999)
- Origin: Walthamstow, London, England
- Genres: Pop; dance-pop; pop-rap; hip-hop
- Years active: 1991–1999; 2006–2013; 2014–present
- Labels: London; Telstar; FOD Records; So, Let's Talk
- Members: Terry Coldwell; Robbie Craig; Joe Livermore
- Past members: John Hendy; Brian Harvey; Tony Mortimer
- Website: east17-official.com

East 17 are an English pop boy band founded by Tony Mortimer, Brian Harvey, John Hendy, and Terry Coldwell in Walthamstow in 1991. They are best known for their 1994 hit single "Stay Another Day", which was the UK Christmas number one that year.

The group has released 18 top-20 singles and four top-10 albums and was one of the UK's most popular boy bands during the early- to mid-1990s, aided by strong tabloid interest in their 'bad boy' image, compared to the clean-cut style of rivals Take That. Their style blended pop and hip-hop in songs such as "House of Love" and "Let It Rain".

According to the British Phonographic Industry, the group has been certified with sales of 1.8 million albums and 3.4 million singles in the UK.

East 17 has undergone multiple lineup changes, with Coldwell remaining the only constant member. The group continues today under the lineup of Terry Coldwell, Joe Livermore, and former Artful Dodger collaborator Robbie Craig.

== History ==
=== 1991–1993: Formation and Walthamstow ===
East 17 began in 1991 when Tony Mortimer was promised a record deal with London Records after he presented his own material. The group was named East 17 after the postcode of their hometown, Walthamstow.

The group was usually seen as a grittier, more political and hip hop or rap-aligned ensemble than rival boy band Take That, as noted by Guy Adams of The Independent:

They shaved their heads, and had tattoos, and were a lot, lot cooler than the nancy boys of Take That. In the great five-year battle that dominated British pop, East 17 were also on the winning side. Their music was sharper and more streetwise. It was infused with hip-hop and R&B, and sold by the bucketload...

— Guy Adams

East 17 had twelve top-10 hits on the UK Singles Chart between 1992 and 1998. Their debut album, Walthamstow, reached No. 1 on the UK Albums Chart. It featured a string of Top 20 singles, including "House of Love" and "Deep". "It's Alright" became a major success in Australia, reaching No. 1 in early 1994 for seven consecutive weeks.

Between 1992 and 1997, the band were managed by Tom Watkins, who had also managed acts like the Pet Shop Boys, Bros, and Kim Wilde.

=== 1994–1996: Steam and Up All Night ===
In 1994, upon the release of their second album, Steam, East 17 scored their only UK number-one single with "Stay Another Day".

The group's next album, 1995's Up All Night, was less successful.

In 1996, the group reached No. 2 with the track "If You Ever", a duet with Gabrielle. The single was featured on their compilation album Around the World Hit Singles: The Journey So Far.

=== 1997–1999: Mortimer's first departure and split ===
In January 1997, Brian Harvey was engulfed in a drug-related controversy when he claimed that he had taken ecstasy pills on a night out, stating in the press that "It's cool to take drugs" and claiming that ecstasy "can make you a better person".

This went against the group's image, and there was intense media scrutiny, leading to questions being raised in the House of Commons. With the group's career and reputation tarnished by the affair, Harvey was immediately sacked and Mortimer decided to leave several months later due to creative differences between himself and the rest of the group.

Coldwell and Hendy later reinstated Harvey and attempted a comeback in 1998, renaming the group E-17. They landed a record deal with Telstar Records after recording an album's worth of self-written material in their home studios. Their first single as E-17 was "Each Time", which reached No. 2 in the UK. But without Mortimer's songwriting influence, the group's initial success soon wavered; sales of their next single, "Betcha Can't Wait", were disappointing, reaching number 12 in the charts, and their album Resurrection failed to make the UK Top 40. The band was later dropped by their label in 1999 and subsequently split up.

=== 1999–2006: Post-split activities ===
In 2001, Harvey, now as a solo artist, released a collaboration with Wyclef Jean, with the Top-20 single "Loving You", but later returned to perform numerous gigs with Coldwell and Hendy. On the ITV1 docusoap Redcoats, the trio were shown performing at Butlins in Bognor. Whilst in 2005, Harvey, Coldwell, and Hendy performed in Mongolia. In May 2005, Harvey was seriously injured in a car accident, requiring surgery.

=== 2006–2009: Second reunion and Mortimer's second departure ===
On 4 February 2006, Harvey appeared on the UK music television show CD:UK, where he announced that East 17 might make a comeback with its original lineup. In mid-February 2006, the group reformed and played their first comeback concert on 30 May at the Shepherd's Bush Empire in London. After reforming for the one-off performance, it was reported that Mortimer had left the group again due to a confrontation with Harvey, leading to an altercation between the two.

A Channel 4 documentary, East 17: The Reunion, which charted the group's rise and fall, along with their subsequent attempt to re-launch, was broadcast in May 2007.

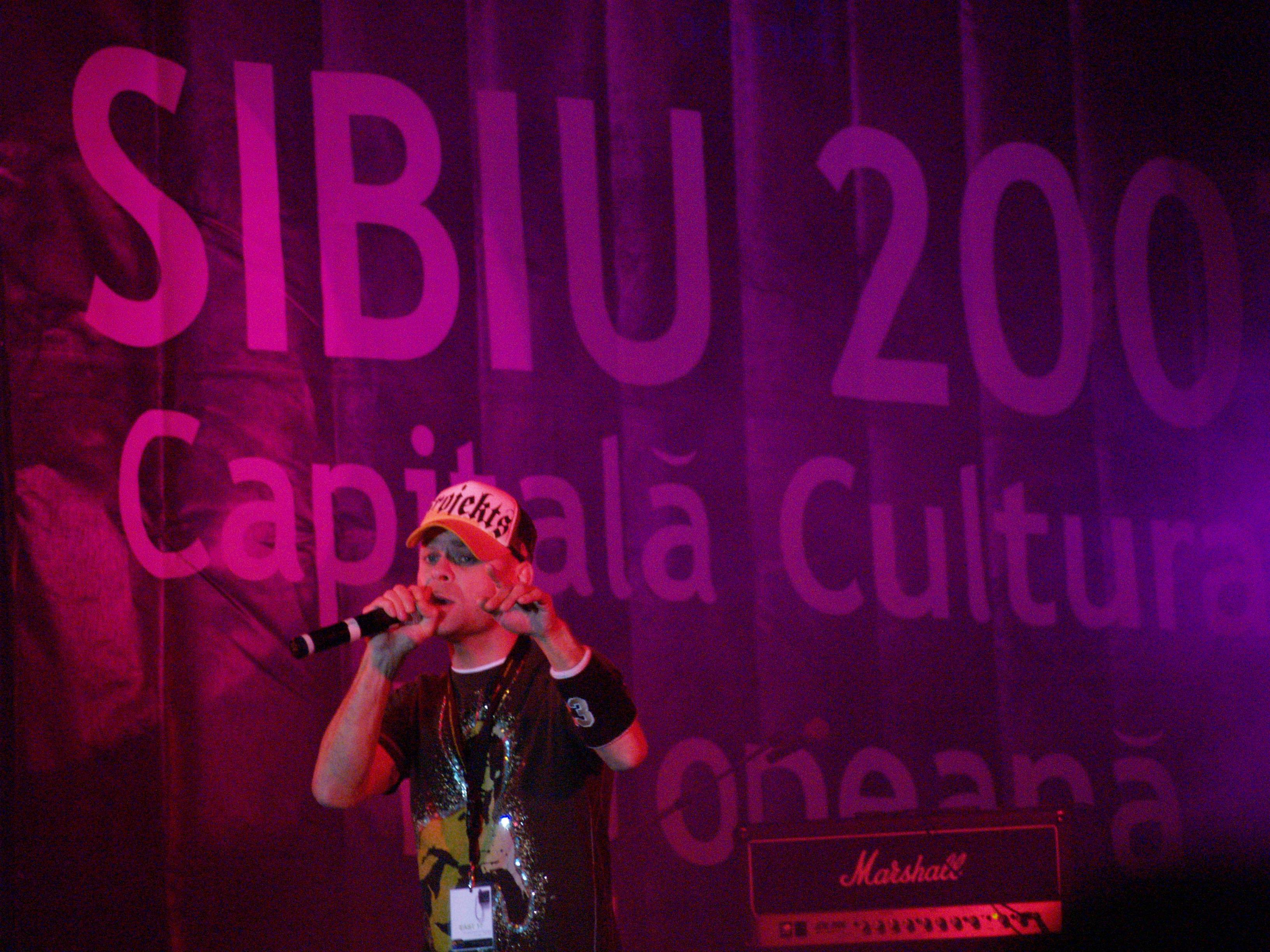
East 17 performing in Sibiu, Romania, on New Year's Eve 2007

East 17 continued to perform without Mortimer as a trio. They played at the University of Strathclyde on 24 September 2006, after DJ Colin Murray was unable to attend. A new single, "Fuck That", was due to be released in early 2008, along with a new album, "Universalization", but both went unreleased.

East 17 performed at the 2009 Glastonbury Festival on 25 June in the dance lounge. In November 2009, the group collaborated with Mortimer in aid of the Born Free Foundation. They performed two of their best-known songs—"Deep" and "Stay Another Day"—for the Wild & Live! event at the Royal Albert Hall. After the performance, the four agreed that it would be best if they never sang together again. However, according to a BBC Radio 2 interview with Zoë Ball in December 2009, Mortimer mentioned that the band were on "talking terms" and planning a comeback for 2010.

=== 2010–2013: Mortimer's third tenure, Harvey's departure, and Dark Light ===
Tony Mortimer returned to East 17 in 2010. Brian Harvey left soon after, when his commitment was questioned by the rest of the group; he had been missing rehearsals and cancelling performances. In 2011, T-Mobile used the East 17 song "House of Love" in a Royal Wedding "spoof" commercial. In April 2011, it was announced that Blair Dreelan had joined the band for their Back to the Future tour in August and September 2011 to promote their comeback single, "Secret of My Life". On 28 September 2011, Dreelan left the group due to contractual obligations. On 27 November 2011, East 17 appeared as musical guests on X Factor Romania.

In 2012, East 17 signed to F.O.D. Records and released their fifth studio album, Dark Light, along with the single "I Can't Get You Off My Mind". Mortimer departed for the third time in 2013.

=== 2013–present: Craig's arrival, 24/7, and line-up changes ===
Robbie Craig (born 1967) joined East 17 in early 2014.

In 2017, East 17 partook in B*Witched's Australia & NZ Tour as a supporting act alongside Atomic Kitten, S Club 3, and Liberty X. During this time, the band released their sixth studio album, 24/7, exclusively in Australia, titling it 24/7: Australian Tour Edition. In June 2018, Hendy departed the group, citing personal reasons, leaving Coldwell as the group's last remaining original member. Since then, Terry John joined the band as Hendy's replacement, performed with them at numerous shows, but eventually also left and was replaced by Joe Livermore.

On 27 August 2021, East 17 released 24/7 internationally.

On 27 May 2022, East 17 released a new single, said to be from an upcoming album, called "I Just Wanna".

On 1 December 2023, the group issued the single "Merry Quitmas". It was released in collaboration with Riot Labs, an anti-smoking charity.

On 11 December 2024, they released the single "Tell Me You're the One".

== Band members ==
Current

- Terry Coldwell (1991–1999, 2006–2013, 2014–present)
- Robbie Craig (2014–present)
- Joe Livermore (2019–present)

Past

- Brian Harvey (1991–1997, 1998–1999, 2006–2010)
- Tony Mortimer (1991–1997, 2006, 2010–2013)
- John Hendy (1991–1999, 2006–2013, 2014–2018)

Touring

- Blair Dreelan (2011)
- Terry John (2018–2019)

== Discography ==
- Walthamstow (1992)
- Steam (1994)
- Up All Night (1995)
- Resurrection (1998)
- Dark Light (2012)
- 24/7 (2017)

== Tours ==
Main

- Letting Off Steam: The Around the World Tour (1994–1995)
- Moscow Olympic Stadium (1996)
- East 17 Live in Australia (2012)

Supporting

- Australia & NZ Tour (2017)

== Awards and nominations ==
Year	Awards	Work	Category	Result	Ref.
1993	Mercury Prize	Walthamstow	Album of the Year	Nominated	
1993	Bravo Otto Awards	Themselves	Best Pop Band (Bronze)	Won	
1994	Bravo Otto Awards	Themselves	Best Pop Band (Bronze)	Won	
1994	Smash Hits Poll Winners Party	Themselves	Best Group in the World	Nominated	
1994	Smash Hits Poll Winners Party	Themselves	Best British Group	Nominated	
1994	Smash Hits Poll Winners Party	Steam	Best Album	Nominated	
1994	Smash Hits Poll Winners Party	"Steam"	Best Single	Nominated	
1994	Smash Hits Poll Winners Party	"Steam"	Best Pop Video	Nominated	
1995	Brit Awards	"Stay Another Day"	Best British Single	Nominated	
1995	Ivor Novello Awards	"Stay Another Day"	Most Performed Work	Nominated	
1995	MTV Europe Music Awards	Themselves	Best Dance	Won	
1996	Smash Hits Poll Winners Party	"If You Ever"	Best Single	Nominated	
1996	Smash Hits Poll Winners Party	Themselves	Best British Group	Nominated	
