= Liza Minnelli discography =

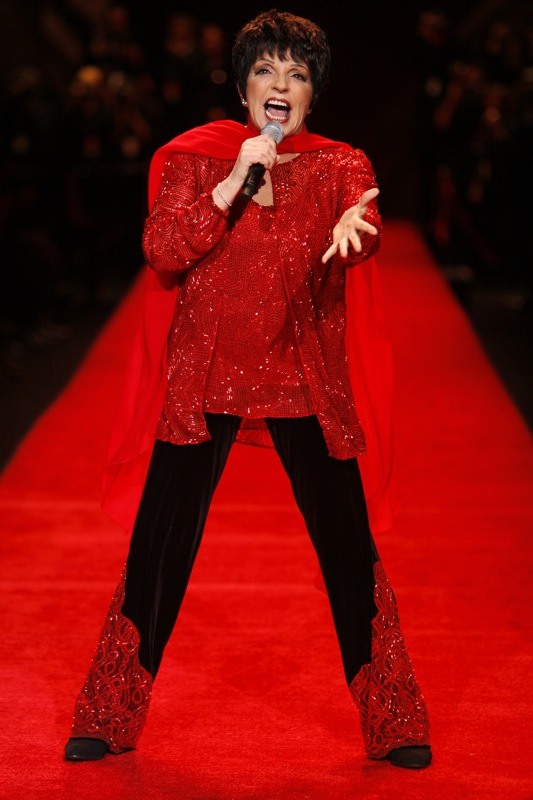
- Red-dressed Minnelli displayed at a national campaign to raise awareness of the risk of heart disease in women — The Heart Truth — on February 1, 2008 during New York Fashion Week.
- Studio albums: 11
- Soundtrack albums: 8
- Live albums: 10
- Compilation albums: 18
- Singles: 33
- Video albums: 5
- Music videos: 5
- Cast recordings: 5
- Tribute by other artists: 1
- Other appearances: 13

American singer Liza Minnelli has released eleven studio albums—Liza! Liza! (1964), It Amazes Me (1965), There Is a Time (1966), Liza Minnelli (1968), Come Saturday Morning (1969), New Feelin' (1970), The Singer (1973), Tropical Nights (1977), Results (1989), Gently (1996), and Confessions (2010). Simultaneously, she contributed to five original cast recordings and eight soundtrack albums, respectively—Best Foot Forward (1963), Flora the Red Menace (1965), The Dangerous Christmas of Red Riding Hood (1965), Cabaret (1972), Liza with a "Z": A Concert for Television (1972), Lucky Lady (1975), A Matter of Time (1976), New York, New York (1977), The Act (1978), The Rink (1984), Stepping Out (1991), Music from The Life: A New Musical (1995) and Sex and the City 2 (2010). Ten live sets were issued as well, such as "Live" at the London Palladium (1965) recorded with Judy Garland, Live at the Olympia in Paris (1972), Live at the Winter Garden (1974), Live at Carnegie Hall (1981), At Carnegie Hall (1987), Live from Radio City Music Hall (1992), Paris — Palais des Congrès: Intégrale du spectacle (1995) along with Charles Aznavour, Minnelli on Minnelli: Live at the Palace (1999), Liza's Back (2002) and Liza's at The Palace.... (2008). Her discography also features eighteen greatest hits compilations, thirty-three singles, five video albums, five music videos and thirteen other appearances.

== Albums ==
=== Studio albums ===
Title	Album details	Peak chart positions								Certifications
Title	Album details	US	AUS	CAN	FRA	GER	NLD	SWE	UK	Certifications
Liza! Liza!	Released: October 12, 1964; Label: Capitol; Format: LP	115	—	—	—	—	—	—	—	
It Amazes Me	Released: May 10, 1965; Label: Capitol; Format: LP	—	—	—	—	—	—	—	—	
There Is a Time	Released: November 21, 1966; Label: Capitol; Format: LP	—	—	—	—	—	—	—	—	
Liza Minnelli	Released: February 26, 1968; Label: A&M; Format: LP	—	—	—	—	—	—	—	—	
Come Saturday Morning	Released: January 26, 1969; Label: A&M; Format: LP	—	—	—	—	—	—	—	—	
New Feelin'	Released: October 19, 1970; Label: A&M; Format: LP, cassette, 8-track	158	—	—	—	—	—	—	—	
The Singer	Released: March 1, 1973; Label: Columbia; Format: LP, cassette, 8-track	38	—	45	—	—	—	—	45	
Tropical Nights	Released: August 15, 1977; Label: Columbia; Format: LP, cassette, 8-track	—	—	—	—	—	—	—	—	
Results	Released: September 12, 1989; Label: Epic; Format: LP, cassette, CD	128	94	—	49	47	92	23	6	UK: Gold; SPA: Gold
Gently	Released: March 19, 1996; Label: Angel; Format: CD	156	—	—	—	—	—	—	58	
Confessions	Released: September 21, 2010; Label: Decca; Format: CD	—	—	—	—	—	—	—	—	
"—" denotes an album that did not chart or was not released in that region.

=== Live albums ===
Title	Album details	Peak chart positions	
Title	Album details	US	BEL (FL)
"Live" at the London Palladium (with Judy Garland)	Released: August 2, 1965; Label: Capitol; Format: LP	41	—
Live at the Olympia in Paris	Released: May 15, 1972; Label: A&M; Format: LP	—	—
Live at the Winter Garden	Released: May 22, 1974; Label: Columbia; Format: LP	150	—
Live at Carnegie Hall	Released: August 1981; Label: Altel; Format: LP	—	—
At Carnegie Hall	Released: October 21, 1987; Label: Telarc; Format: LP, CD	156	—
Live from Radio City Music Hall	Released: November 10, 1992; Label: Columbia; Format: CD	—	—
Paris — Palais des Congrès (with Charles Aznavour)	Released: July 18, 1995; Label: EMI; Format: CD	—	40
Minnelli on Minnelli: Live at the Palace	Released: February 29, 2000; Label: Angel; Format: CD	—	—
Liza's Back	Released: October 29, 2002; Label: J Records; Format: CD	—	—
Liza's at The Palace....	Released: February 3, 2009; Label: Hybrid; Format: CD	^{[A]}	—
"—" denotes an album that did not chart or was not released in that region.

Notes

- A Liza's at The Palace... charted on the component Top Independent Albums chart in USA at number #42.

=== Soundtracks ===
Year	Album details	Peak chart positions									Certifications
Year	Album details	US	AUS	AUT	BEL (FL)	CAN	GER	ITA	NZ	UK	Certifications
1965	The Dangerous Christmas of Red Riding Hood: Released: November 1965; Label: ABC (#ABCS 536); Format: LP	—	—	—	—	—	—	—	—	—	
1972	Cabaret: Released: 1972 (*RE: 1974, 1976, 1989); Label: ABC (#ABCD 752); Format: LP, CD (*1989)	25	10	—	—	22	—	5	—	13	US: Gold
1972	Liza with a "Z": A Concert for Television: Released: 1972 (*RE: 1983, 2006); Label: Columbia (#31762); Format: LP, CD/DVD (*2006, Showtime Ent.)	19	17	—	—	27	—	—	—	9	US: Gold
1975	Lucky Lady: Released: January 1976; Label: Arista (#AL 4069); Format: LP	—	—	—	—	—	—	—	—	—	
1976	A Matter of Time (aka Nina): Released: October 1976; Label: (#); Format: LP, Cassette, 8 Track	—	—	—	—	—	—	—	—	—	
1977	New York, New York: Released: June 1977; Label: Liberty (#LKBL-750); Format: LP, CD (reissue)	50	92	—	—	—	—	—	—	—	
1991	Stepping Out: Released: September 1991; Label: Milan Records (#212 062); Format: LP, CD	—	—	—	—	—	—	—	—	—	
2010	Sex and the City 2: Released: May 25, 2010; Label: WaterTower Music (#WTM39192); Format: CD	13	7	13	73	12	12	—	22	^{[B]}	
"—" denotes an album that did not chart or was not released in that region.

Notes

- B In the UK, Sex and the City 2 charted at number 7 on the UK Compilation Chart.

=== Cast recordings ===
Year	Album details	Peak chart positions
Year	Album details	US
1963	Best Foot Forward: Released: 1963; Label: Cadence (#CLP 24012); Format: LP	—
1965	Flora the Red Menace: Released: May 1965; Label: RCA Victor (#LSO-1111); Format: LP	115
1978	The Act: Released: 1978; Label: DRG (#6101); Format: LP	—
1984	The Rink: Released: 1984; Label: Polydor (#823 125–4); Format: LP, CD	—
1995	Music from The Life: A New Musical: Released: 1996; Label: RCA Victor (#09026-68001-4); Format: CD, Cassette	—
"—" denotes an album that did not chart or was not released in that region.

=== Compilations ===
Year	Album details	Peak chart positions	
Year	Album details	US	UK
1970	The Liza Minnelli Foursider (Note: The Liza Minnelli Foursider was re-released many times in different formats over the years, same tracklist, but different covers ("A&M Gold Series"- in 1991, "Master Series" in 1999 and "Millennium Edition" in 2000)): Released: 1970; Label: A&M Records; Format: LP	(Note: The album peaked at #207 in the Billboard's Bubbling Under charts.)	—
1973	Liza Minnelli Sings The Sensational Hit From The Film "Cabaret" Maybe This Time: Released: 1973; Label: Capital; Format: LP; CD (1988)	—	—
1982	Liza Minnelli (American Superstars) (Note: Liza Minnelli (American Superstars) was re-released in different formats over the years, same tracklist, but different covers ("Cabaret: The very best Of Liza Minnelli"- in 1994 and "Cabaret" in 1995.)): Released: 1982; Label: Memory; Format: LP, CD	—	—
1995	The Collection: Released: 1995; Label: Spectrum Music / Karussell; Format: CD	—	—
1997	A Touch of Class: Released: 1997; Label: Disky; Format: CD	—	—
1998	It Was a Good Time: The Best of Judy Garland & Liza Minnelli: Released: August 4, 1998; Label: Curb Records; Format: CD	—	—
1999	All that Jazz: Released: January 1, 1999; Label: Sony Music; Format: CD	—	—
2000	16 Biggest Hits (Note: 16 Biggest Hits was re-released as a double disc with additional 5 tracks, and titled XXI.): Released: July 18, 2000; Label: Legacy / Columbia; Format: CD	—	—
2001	20th Century Masters – The Millennium Collection: The Best of Liza Minnelli: Released: April 3, 2001; Label: A&M; Format: CD	—	—
2001	The Capitol Years (Note: The Capitol Years was also released as Essential with different artwork but same tracklisting.): Released: June 5, 2001; Label: EMI Music; Format: CD	—	—
2001	Ultimate Collection: Released: November 6, 2001; Label: Hip-O Records; Format: CD	—	—
2002	Life Is a Cabaret!: Released: 2002; Label: Columbia Records; Format: CD	—	77
2004	When It Comes Down To It.......1968–1977: Released: February 17, 2004; Label: Raven Records; Format: CD	—	—
2004	The Best of Liza Minnelli: Released: September 14, 2004; Label: Legacy / Columbia/; Format: CD	—	—
2005	Say Liza: Released: May 24, 2005; Label: Sony Music; Format: CD	—	—
2006	The Complete Capitol Collection: Released: August 8, 2006; Label: DRG; Format: CD	—	—
2008	The Complete A&M Recordings: Released: November 25, 2008; Label: Universal Music; Format: CD	—	—
2009	Finest: Released: August 18, 2009; Label: EMI; Format: CD	—	—
2010	Cabaret... And All That Jazz: Released: September 6, 2010; Label: Salvo; Format: CD	—	—

== Singles ==
Title	Year	Peak chart positions												Album
Title	Year	AUS	AUT	BEL (FL)	CAN AC	FRA	GER	ITA	NLD 40	NLD 100	NZ	UK	US DC	Album
"You Are for Loving"	1963	—	—	—	—	—	—	—	—	—	—	—	—	Non-album singles
"One Summer Love"	1963	—	—	—	—	—	—	—	—	—	—	—	—	Non-album singles
"Day Dreaming"	1963	—	—	—	—	—	—	—	—	—	—	—	—	Non-album singles
"Shouldn't There Be Lightning"	1965	—	—	—	—	—	—	—	—	—	—	—	—	Non-album singles
"A Quiet Thing"	1965	—	—	—	—	—	—	—	—	—	—	—	—	Non-album singles
"Imprevu"	1965	—	—	—	—	—	—	—	—	—	—	—	—	Non-album singles
"Hello, Liza! Hello, Mama!" (with Judy Garland)	1965	—	—	—	—	—	—	—	—	—	—	—	—	"Live" at the London Palladium
"I Who Have Nothing"	1966	—	—	—	—	—	—	—	—	—	—	—	—	There Is a Time
"Middle of the Street"	1966	—	—	—	—	—	—	—	—	—	—	—	—	There Is a Time
"Married" / "You'd Better Sit Down Kids"	1968	—	—	—	—	—	—	—	—	—	—	—	—	Liza Minnelli
"Love Story"	1970	—	—	—	—	—	—	—	—	—	—	—	—	Come Saturday Morning
"(I Wonder Where My) Easy Rider's Gone"	1971	—	—	—	—	—	—	—	—	—	—	—	—	New Feelin'
"Frank Mills"	1972	—	—	—	—	—	—	—	—	—	—	—	—	Non-album single
"Cabaret"	1972	—	—	—	—	—	—	—	—	—	—	—	—	Cabaret
"Ring Them Bells"	1972	—	—	—	—	—	—	—	—	—	—	—	—	Liza With a "Z"
"The Singer"	1972	—	—	—	42	—	—	—	—	—	—	—	—	The Singer
"Don't Let Me Be Lonely Tonight"	1973	—	—	—	—	—	—	—	—	—	—	—	—	The Singer
"Dancing in the Moonlight"	1973	—	—	—	—	—	—	—	—	—	—	—	—	The Singer
"I Believe in Music"	1973	—	—	—	—	—	—	—	—	—	—	—	—	The Singer
"More Than I Like You"	1974	—	—	—	95	—	—	—	—	—	—	—	—	Non-album single
"That Feeling for Home"	1974	—	—	—	—	—	—	—	—	—	—	—	—	Journey Back to Oz
"All That Jazz"	1975	—	—	—	—	—	—	—	—	—	—	—	—	Non-album single
"Lucky Lady"	1976	—	—	—	—	—	—	—	—	—	—	—	—	Lucky Lady
"Theme from New York, New York"	1977	—	—	—	—	—	—	37	—	—	—	—	^{[C]}	New York, New York
"But the World Goes 'Round"	1977	—	—	—	—	—	—	—	—	—	—	—	—	New York, New York
"Losing My Mind"	1989	72	19	17	—	42	17	27	31	36	23	6	26	Results
"Don't Drop Bombs"	1989	—	—	—	—	—	—	—	—	—	—	46	—	Results
"So Sorry, I Said"	1989	161	—	—	—	—	—	—	—	—	—	62	—	Results
"Love Pains"	1990	—	—	—	—	—	31	36	—	—	—	41	—	Results
"The Day After That"	1993	—	—	—	—	—	—	—	—	—	—	—	—	Non-album single
"Does He Love You?" (with Donna Summer)	1996	—	—	—	—	—	—	—	—	—	—	—	—	Gently
"Let's Make a Date" (with Johnny Rodgers)	2008	—	—	—	—	—	—	—	—	—	—	—	—	Non-album singles
"A Love Letter from the Times" (with Christian Borle; from the NBC TV series Smash)	2013	—	—	—	—	—	—	—	—	—	—	—	—	Non-album singles
"Kids Wait Till You Hear This"	2026	—	—	—	—	—	—	—	—	—	—	—	—	Non-album singles
"—" denotes a single that did not chart or was not released in that region.

- C "Theme from New York, New York" reached number 4 on the Bubbling Under Hot 100 in the US.

== Other appearances ==
Year	Song(s)	Role	Notes
1973	"Man with the Golden Gun" with Alice Cooper	Back vocal	Appears on Cooper's set Muscle of Love, released on Warner Bros.
1973	"Teenage Lament '74"	Back vocal	Appears on Cooper's set Muscle of Love, released on Warner Bros.
1974	"A Faraway Land"	Lead vocal	Appears in the animated movie Journey Back to Oz by Filmation
1974	"Keep a Happy Thought"	Lead vocal	Appears in the animated movie Journey Back to Oz by Filmation
1974	"Return to the Land of Oz March"	Lead vocal	Appears in the animated movie Journey Back to Oz by Filmation
1974	"That Feeling for Home"	Lead vocal	Appears in the animated movie Journey Back to Oz by Filmation
1975	"(Get) While the Getting is Good"	Lead vocal	Appears in the film Lucky Lady
1975	"Lucky Lady Montage"	Lead vocal	Appears in the film Lucky Lady
1975	"Lucky Lady (Reprise)"	Lead vocal	Appears in the film Lucky Lady
1975	"A Matter of Time"	Lead vocal	Appears in the film A Matter of Time
1975	"The Me I Haven't Met Yet"	Lead vocal	Appears in the film A Matter of Time
1980	[Several tracks] with Hilly Michaels	Back vocal	Recorded for the Michaels' album Calling All Girls, released on Warner Bros.
1987	"Remember"/"Always"/"What'll I Do" with Michael Feinstein	Lead vocal	Appears on the duets album Remember: Michael Feinstein Sings Irving Berlin, issued on Asylum.
1992	"We Are the Champions" with Queen & VA	Lead vocal	Appears on The Freddie Mercury Tribute Concert, issued on VHS by PMI. In 2002 released also on DVD.
1993	"I've Got the World on a String" with Frank Sinatra	Lead vocal	Appears on the Sinatra's set Duets, released through Capitol.
1996	'New York, New York" with Luciano Pavarotti	Lead vocal	Appears on the charity live compilation Pavarotti & Friends for War Child, by Decca.
1999	"Some People"	Lead vocal	Appears on the charity live compilation My Favourite Broadway: The Leading Ladies, by TVT Soundtrax.
2006	"Mama" with My Chemical Romance	Back vocal	Appears on the album The Black Parade by My Chemical Romance, issued on Reprise.
2021	"Introduction"	Lead vocal	Appears on the album Act One by Nicolas King, released through Club44 Records.

== Tribute by other artists ==
- 1990: "Keep It Together" by Madonna — the closing song of the set list on her Blond Ambition World Tour (her nod to Cabaret)

== Videos ==
=== Video albums ===
Year	Album details	Certifications	Notes
1982	An Evening With Liza Minnelli: Released: 1982; Label: CBS/Fox Video; Format: VHS		Recorded live at the New Orleans Theater of the Performing Arts, Liza Minnelli sings some of her songs, from blues to ballads. Also included are songs from the hit musicals "Cabaret" and "New York, New York."
1990	Visible Results: Released: 1990 (RE: *2004); Label: CBS (#49035); Format: VHS, DVD (*2004)		Import release featuring three music videos, such as "Losing My Mind", "Don't Dromp Bombs" and "So Sorry, I Said"; all produced by Pet Shop Boys and Julian Mendelsohn.
1992	Live from Radio City Music Hall: Released: November 10, 1992; Label: Columbia (#89870); Format: VHS, DVD (reissue)	US: Gold	Thirty-track release featuring live recordings from Radio City Music Hall, divided into two acts, and a video equivalent of her audio release of the same name.
2006	Liza with a Z: Released: April 4, 2006; Label: Showtime Entertainment; Format: DVD		As well as a restored picture, the DVD also offers the viewer the option of a 5.1 surround sound soundtrack.
2009	Liza's at The Palace....: Released: 2009; Label: MPI HOME VIDEO; Format: DVD, Blu-ray		Also released as a double CD.

=== Music videos ===
Year	Song	Director	Video album
1989	"Losing My Mind"	Brian Grant	Visible Results
1989	"Don't Drop Bombs"	Brian Grant	Visible Results
1990	"So Sorry, I Said"	Terry Donovan	Visible Results
1990	"Love Pains"	—N/a	—
1993	"The Day After That"	—N/a	—

== See also ==
- List of EMI artists
- List of former A&M Records artists
- List of Columbia Records artists
- List of Epic Records artists
- List of Decca Records artists
- List of AFI's 100 Years...100 Songs
- List of songs about New York City
- List of Broadway musicals stars
- List of persons who have won Academy, Emmy, Grammy, and Tony Awards
- List of performers on Top of the Pops
- List of Royal Variety Performances
