= Liza Minnelli (compilation) =

- American Superstars: Liza Minnelli LP cover

Compilation album by Liza Minnelli
- Released: 1982
- Recorded: 1972–1977
- Genre: Jazz, pop, disco
- Label: Columbia

Liza Minnelli chronology
Live at Carnegie Hall (1981)	Liza Minnelli (1982)	The Rink (1984)

Liza Minnelli is a compilation album by American singer and actress Liza Minnelli, released in 1982 as part of the "American Superstars" LP series by CBS Records. The album brings together recordings by the artist made during the 1970s, a period when she was under contract with Columbia Records. Over the years, the compilation has been re-released in different formats, new covers and titles such as C-A-B-A-R-E-T: The Very Best of Liza Minnelli, Cabaret and Simply the Best.

The compilation focuses primarily on the album The Singer (1973), from which ten of the twelve tracks on the LP edition were taken, complemented by songs from the albums Liza with a Z (1972) and Live at the Winter Garden (1974). The CD versions added four tracks from the albums Tropical Nights (1977) and Cabaret (1972). AllMusic rated the album three out of five stars.

== Album details ==
Liza Minnelli is a compilation album of twelve songs by Liza Minnelli, released by Memory in Germany in 1982, as part of the American Superstars series. The compilation covers the singer's career in the 1970s when she was signed to Columbia Records. Over the years, the compilation has been re-released with different covers and titles, including: C-A-B-A-R-E-T: The Very Best of Liza Minnelli, Cabaret and Simply the Best. The compact disc (CD) versions gained four additional tracks, plus subtle differences in the original track listing.

The songs chosen for the LP edition of the "American Superstars" series come mostly (10 of the 12 tracks) from the 1973 album The Singer. From the albums Liza with a Z, 1972 and Live at the Winter Garden, 1974, only one song was taken from each: "Son of a Preacher Man" and "If You Could Read My Mind", respectively. The versions released on CD additionally feature four songs from the 1977 album Tropical Nights ("I Love Every Little Thing About You", "A Beautiful Thing", "Easy" "Come Home Baby") and the track "Cabaret" from the soundtrack of the 1972 film of the same name. Furthermore, it "excluded the song "Use Me" from The Singer (1973).

== Critical reception ==
Professional ratings
Review scores
Source	Rating
AllMusic	3/5 stars

Writing for the AllMusic website, critic William Ruhlmann reviewed the CD version titled Simply the Best. He noted that the title given to the re-release is simply not true, since the compilation does not bring together Minnelli's biggest hits and best-known songs but rather recordings from four albums from the 1970s. Ruhlmann considered the selection of chosen songs a "strange mixture" that favors the 1973 album The Singer in almost its entirety. Finally, he pointed out that "Liza Minnelli's Columbia catalog is a mixed bag, but it's possible to create a much better selection than this one".

Commercially, it failed to appear on the Billboard 200 chart.

== Track listing ==
Liza Minnelli – Side A
No.	Title	Writer(s)	Album	Length
1.	"You Are the Sunshine of My Life"	Stevie Wonder	The Singer	2:36
2.	"I'd Love You to Want Me"	Lobo	The Singer	3:36
3.	"Baby Don't Get Hooked on Me"	Mac Davis	The Singer	2:52
4.	"Dancing in the Moonlight"	Sherman Kelly	The Singer	3:19
5.	"Oh, Babe, What Would You Say?"	Eileen Sylvia Smith	The Singer	3:31
6.	"Son of a Preacher Man"	John Hurley and Ronnie Wilkins	Liza with a Z	3:22

Liza Minnelli – Side B
No.	Title	Writer(s)	Album	Length
1.	"If You Could Read My Mind"	Gordon Lightfoot	Live at the Winter Garden	2:56
2.	"You're So Vain"	Carly Simon	The Singer	3:30
3.	"Use Me"	Bill Withers	The Singer	3:39
4.	"I Believe in Music"	Mac Davis	The Singer	3:37
5.	"Where Is the Love"	Ralph MacDonald, William Salter	The Singer	2:49
6.	"The Singer"	Walter Marks	The Singer	2:31

Simply The Best
No.	Title	Writer(s)	Album	Length
1.	"You Are the Sunshine of My Life"	Stevie Wonder	The Singer	2:36
2.	"I'd Love You to Want Me"	Lobo	The Singer	3:36
3.	"Baby Don't Get Hooked on Me"	Mac Davis	The Singer	2:52
4.	"Dancing in the Moonlight"	Sherman Kelly	The Singer	3:19
5.	"Oh, Babe, What Would You Say?"	Eileen Sylvia Smith	The Singer	3:31
6.	"Son of a Preacher Man"	John Hurley and Ronnie Wilkins	Liza with a Z	3:22
7.	"I Love Every Little Thing About you"	Stevie Wonder	Tropical Nights	3:11
8.	"A Beautiful Thing"	Jim Grady	Tropical Nights	3:24
9.	"If you Could Read my Mind"	Gordon Lightfoot	Live at the Winter Garden	3:56
10.	"You're So Vain"	Carly Simon	The Singer	3:30
11.	"Cabaret"	John Kander, Fred Ebb	Cabaret	3:35
12.	"I Believe in Music"	Mac Davis	The Singer	3:37
13.	"Where is the Love"	Ralph MacDonald, William Salter	The Singer	2:49
14.	"The Singer"	Walter Marks	The Singer	2:31
15.	"Easy"	Jim Grady	Tropical Nights	3:42
16.	"Come Home Babe"	Jim Grady	Tropical Nights	3:24
