= Liza Minnelli (Warhol) =

1978 painting by Andy Warhol

- Artist: Andy Warhol
- Year: 1978
- Medium: Acrylic and silkscreen enamel on canvas
- Movement: Pop Art
- Subject: Liza Minnelli
- Dimensions: 102 cm × 102 cm (40 in × 40 in)

Liza Minnelli is a 1978 painting by American artist Andy Warhol depicting actress and singer Liza Minnelli. Warhol met Minnelli in the 1960s, and they became close friends in the 1970s, frequently socializing together. In 1978, Minnelli posed for Warhol at the Factory, resulting in a series of silkscreen portraits. Warhol gave Minnelli a miniature 14 × 14-inch portrait as a gift and also produced commissioned 40 × 40-inch portraits of her.

== Background ==
Pop artist Andy Warhol had a fascination with Hollywood and admiration for actress Judy Garland since childhood. He recalled saving pennies to see every Garland film and that "it's so great to be good friends with her daughters, Liza Minnelli and Lorna Luft." He compared the sisters to "Jackie and Lee," describing their boundless energy and said that they often persuaded him to do things he "normally wouldn't." He added, "Liza has what Diana Vreeland calls 'built-in show biz.' Diana was talking about Lucie Arnaz, another one of my favorite singers and dancers, but it applies to all the children of Hollywood stars. They grew up not knowing the difference between acting and real life, so they're the best actors in the world."

Warhol first met Minnelli at the Scene in New York City in August 1965. In his memoir POPism: The Warhol '60s (1980), he recalled: "Liza Minnelli was there with Peter Allen—I think they were engaged then, Judy had fixed them up. Liza was just starting out, doing Flora the Red Menace on Broadway, dancing with a cast on her leg, even. At the Scene that night I saw a couple of guys pointing out Liza's and Edie's legs as the best in town."

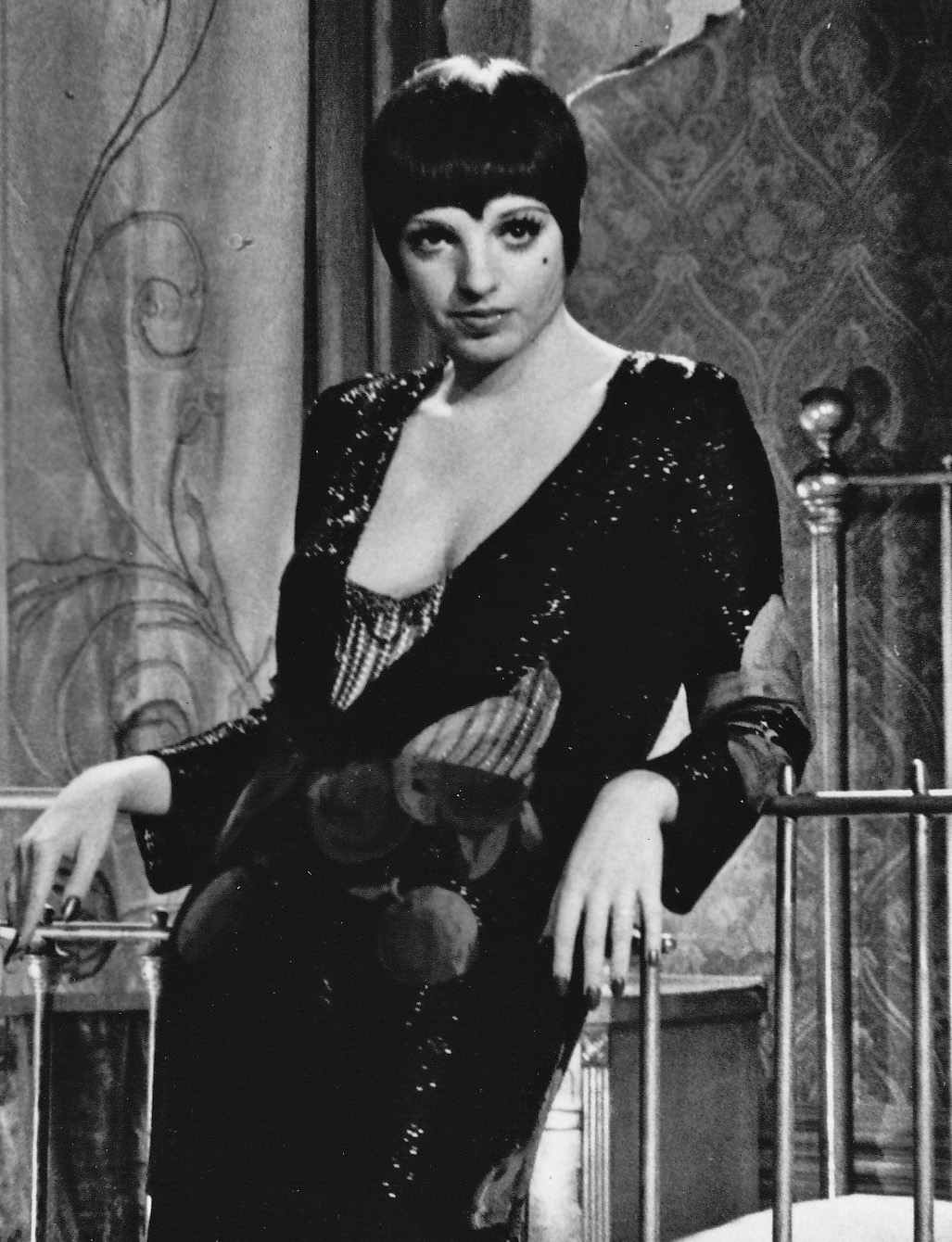
Minnelli in the film Cabaret (1972)

Their friendship developed in the early 1970s through their mutual friend, fashion designer Halston. In 1971, Warhol attended a party hosted by model Marisa Berenson for Minnelli at Club Prive in Paris. The following year, he attended a supper dance for Minnelli hosted by Marisa and Berry Berenson at Al Mounia in New York City on February 6, 1972. He also attended the New York premiere of Minnelli's film Cabaret at the Ziegfeld Theatre on February 13. That August, Minnelli appeared on the cover of Andy Warhol's Interview magazine. She subsequently appeared on the magazine's cover several more times in the following decades.

Throughout the 1970s, Warhol and Minnelli frequently socialized, and he regularly attended her performances. By the late 1970s, Warhol, Minnelli, Halston, and Bianca Jagger were closely associated with New York's Studio 54 nightclub. Warhol included photographs of Minnelli in his book Exposures (1979), and continued to document their friendship and social outings in The Andy Warhol Diaries, published posthumously in 1989.

In 1978, Minnelli sat for Warhol at the Factory and purchased the resulting portrait for $25,000. That same year, she commissioned Warhol to create portraits of her mother. In a later interview, Minnelli reflected on Warhol's portrait of her, stating: "He made me see myself and my parents differently. He found emotional colors that I'd never noticed before." She added, "I will always cherish what Andy captured. I see his brilliance every day," while gesturing toward her heart.

== Production ==
On February 17, 1978, Minnelli visited the Factory to sit for Warhol. The artist photographed her with a Polaroid camera, using the images as the basis for a series of silkscreen portraits. In his diary, Warhol wrote that Minnelli was initially nervous during the sitting, but "she was wearing the right makeup and all the pictures came out good."

Warhol later recounted the session, describing the excitement that accompanied Minnelli's visit to the Factory. "Whenever Liza walks into a room everything stops and people wait for the act to begin," he recalled as members of the Factory staff gathered to watch her eat lunch. During the sitting, musician John Lennon unexpectedly arrived at the Factory because he was working with Warhol's printer Rupert Jasen Smith. Minnelli, who had never met Lennon, eagerly rushed to greet him, prompting Warhol to remark, "It's really great to be there when two big stars collide, especially if you have your camera and your tape recorder. They looked so adorable together. They should do a show together. I'd love to produce it."

For the photo session, Minnelli wore the red sequined Halston costume from her 1977 Broadway musical The Act. After she left, Warhol collected the sequins that had fallen from her costume, writing, "I put them in a paper bag. I'm saving them."

From these photographs, Warhol presented Minnelli with a unique small portrait for her Tony Award nomination, which she eventually won for Best Performance by a Leading Actress in a Musical for The Act at the 32nd Tony Awards in June 1978. The reverse of the canvas bears the inscription: "to LIZA (Happy Tony) Andy Warhol 78." Warhol also produced larger standard size portraits.

== Description ==
Each 40 × 40-inch (102 × 102 cm) portrait depicts Minnelli's head and shoulders against a monochromatic background. Based on a Polaroid photograph taken by Warhol at the Factory, the paintings emphasize her signature cropped black hair, pale skin, red lips, and expressive eyes. The photographic image was silkscreened and hand-painted in acrylic onto canvas. Warhol produced the portraits in different color combinations, varying the background and facial tones while retaining the same underlying photographic image.

== Interpretation ==
Art historian Robert Rosenblum compared Warhol's portraits of Minnelli to Édouard Manet's Olympia, arguing that Warhol flattened her face through the effects of flash photography and cosmetics, reducing the image to abrupt contrasts of light and dark. He wrote that Warhol had "retouched reality to push his pictorial facts to a two-dimensional extreme," in which "middle values vanish" as the sitter's features are compressed into the flatness of paint and canvas. Despite this artificial façade, Rosenblum contended that the portraits retain a powerful emotional presence, observing that "from behind this brash silhouette, a pair of all too human, almost tearful eyes returns our gaze."

== Exhibitions ==
Two of the portraits were included in Andy Warhol: Portraits of the '70s, a retrospective organized by David Whitney at the Whitney Museum of American Art in New York City from November 1979, to January 1980. Surveying Warhol's portrait commissions of the decade, the exhibition featured more than one hundred 40 × 40-inch paintings, two portraits of each subject. An accompanying book was published by Random House.

In 1989, two Liza Minnelli portraits were included in Andy Warhol: A Retrospective at the Museum of Modern Art in New York City, the first major retrospective of the artist's work following his death.

In 2002, two Liza Minnelli portraits were included in Andy Warhol Retrospective at the Museum of Contemporary Art, Los Angeles.

Two Liza Minnelli portraits were included in the exhibition Andy Warhol Celebrities: More than Fifteen Minutes at Bellagio Gallery of Fine Art in Paradise, Nevada from February to September 2003. Minnelli also narrated the exhibition's audio guide.

In 2005, two Liza Minnelli portraits were exhibited in Dia's Andy at Dia:Beacon in Beacon, New York, an exhibition commemorating the tenth anniversary of the Andy Warhol Museum in Pittsburgh.

Two Liza Minnelli portraits were included in the exhibition Andy Warhol: A Celebration of Life … and Death held at the National Gallery of Scotland in Edinburgh from August to October 2007.

A portrait of Minelli was included in the retrospective Andy Warhol—From A to B and Back Again at the Whitney Museum of American Art in New York City from November 2018 to March 2019.

== Critical reception ==
Reviewing Andy Warhol: Portraits of the '70s at the Whitney for the News Journal, Gary Mullinax wrote that Warhol's portraits of Minnelli demonstrated how he could intensify her "characteristic appearance" without obscuring her "normal countenance." He observed that the "garish acrylic embellishments" layered over the silkscreened photographs heightened Minnelli's "dark doe eyes and bright red lips." Mullinax argued that the portraits were not representations of reality but "embellishments of other images," since the source photographs already mediated the public's perception of Minnelli. He concluded that Warhol "makes fictions of fictions," using celebrity portraiture to explore the elusive nature of reality and the constructed image of fame, and described him as "the perfect artist for our time."

In a review for the Daily News, John Daxland wrote that Warhol's combination of silkscreen photography and acrylic paint produced "lucid and sometimes exciting visual images." He praised the Liza Minnelli portraits as "radiant panels showing bright red lips and big round eyes—they seem happy," contrasting their exuberance with Warhol's more subdued portrait of Golda Meir.

== Collections ==
Minnelli owns a collection of works by Warhol, including portraits of herself and her parents, actress Judy Garland and director Vincente Minnelli. Fashion designer Halston also owned two Liza Minnelli portraits by Warhol. The Andy Warhol Museum in Pittsburgh holds two Liza Minnelli portraits, one with a pink background and the other with a green background.

== Art market ==
The 14 × 14-inch Liza (1978) that Warhol gifted to Minnelli remained in her personal collection for more than three decades before it sold for $902,500 at Christie's in New York in November 2011.

In 2016, Minnelli offered 22 works by Warhol from her collection for private sale, including four portraits of herself and works depicting her parents. The collection was reportedly valued at more than $40 million, but no buyers were found. In 2018, one of Minnelli's Warhol paintings, a silkscreen portrait of her mother, was sold by Pace Gallery for $7 million to an unidentified buyer.

== In pop culture ==
Warhol's Liza Minnelli portrait appeared on the cover of the May 1980 issue of Art in America.

Minnelli used one of her portraits for the cover of her 1981 album Live at Carnegie Hall.
