= Tropical Nights (album) =

Studio album by Liza Minnelli
- Released: August 15, 1977
- Recorded: 1976–1977
- Genres: Pop, disco, vocal, traditional
- Length: 35:18
- Label: Columbia
- Producers: Rik Pekkonen, Steve March

Liza Minnelli chronology
Lucky Lady (1976)	Tropical Nights (1977)	New York, New York (1977)

Tropical Nights is the eighth studio album by American singer and actress Liza Minnelli, released by Columbia Records in 1977. At the time of its release, disco music was the most played musical style on the radio. In this context, it was decided that the style would be adopted by the singer, who was already known for numerous changes in her music.

The release followed the success of the soundtracks for Liza with a Z and Cabaret, and it marks her first studio album since The Singer (1973). Due to her prior involvement in the musical film New York, New York and the Broadway play The Act, the opportunity to promote Tropical Nights was compromised.

The reception from the music critics was favorable, with many praising the singer's performance and vocals, while others found the repertoire confusing and lacking identity. Commercially, the album appeared for four weeks on the list of the top 200 best-selling albums in the Record World chart.

== Production and composition ==
The production was made by Rik Pekkonen and Steve March for Waylentsote Productions. It was mixed and engineered by Rik Pekkonen, with arrangements by Jim Grady. The recordings took place over three nights at the Le Palace Theater in Paris. Bernie Grundman handled the album's mastering at A&M Studios. The album's design was made by Nancy Donald, and the photography was carried out by Reid Miles (who received $65,000 for his work).

The title track's composition was crafted by Mark Winkler, marking his debut as a recorded songwriter. Winkler was working as a waiter in Beverly Hills when singer-songwriter Steve Marc Torme approached him with the possibility of contributing a song for Liza Minnelli. Later, Winkler presented a demo version of the composition. Torme, in turn, felt that "Tropical Nights," with its theatrical musical style, would be suitable for Minnelli. The composer went through a period of silence until he learned that the singer was in the process of recording the song with a 30-piece orchestra in Hollywood. This revelation coincided with the announcement that the track would be chosen as the title for her new album. It was also revealed that the original three-minute musical structure had been expanded into a six-and-a-half-minute disco piece, incorporating elements such as a rainstorm, a conga line, and the melody of "Bali Hai" opening the composition. The song appeared among the most played tracks on the Record World disco music chart on October 1, 1977.

== Release and promotion ==
On October 15, 1977, Billboard announced the album's release in the "New LP/Tapes Releases" section.

In 1977, Minnelli had already appeared in the musical film New York, New York and in the Broadway musical The Act, which made the promotion of Tropical Nights impossible.

In 2002, twenty-five years after its release, the label DRG Records released Tropical Nights in a remastered version. In 2017, Cherry Red Records released an expanded version that includes five bonus tracks, namely: "More Than I Like You" and its B-side "Harbour" (two tracks from a single, not included in an album, from 1974), and three versions in different languages of Minnelli's last single for Columbia, "The Day After That," from 1993. The song was part of the musical Kiss of a Spider Woman, in which Minnelli participated. The singer used the recording as a call to fight for an AIDS cure.

== Critical reception ==
Professional ratings
Review scores
Source	Rating
AllMusic	2/5 stars

Ron Fell of The Gavin Report newspaper selected the tracks "Come Home Babe," "Easy," "I'm Your New Best Friend," and "Tropical Nights" as the album's best moments. The critic from Cashbox wrote that Minnelli supports "her exuberant lyrical punches with a powerful band and musical arrangements that complete a winning combination."

Peter Reilly of HiFi-Stereo Review considered the singer's performance remarkable, and the recording very good. He highlighted the songs "I Love Every Little Thing About You," "Come Home Babe," "Take Me Through / I Could Come To Love You," and "A Beautiful Thing" as the album's best moments. The critic from Walrus! newspaper wrote that the album is pleasant and has "hot studio rhythms – aimed at B-rock – [that] sustain the [tropical] concept." As a negative point, he noted that it doesn't sound like a Liza Minnelli album and that it "could have been made by anyone."

William Ruhlmann of AllMusic considered the album "confusing". He mentioned that only in the final tracks "does the pace slow down, the strings grow, and the singer stands out".

== Commercial performance ==
It debuted at number 156 on the list of the top 200 best-selling albums in Record World magazine, which was its peak on the chart. It remained on the chart for an additional three weeks, with its last appearance on October 1 of the same year, at number 173. On the Billboard disco music chart, titled Billboard's Disco Action, referring to the state of Philadelphia, it reached number 13.

== Track listing ==
No.	Title	Writer(s)	Length
1.	"Jimi Jimi"	Jim Grady	4:00
2.	"When It Comes Down to It"	Minnie Riperton, Richard Rudolph	3:35
3.	"I Love Every Little Thing About You"	Stevie Wonder	3:11
4.	"Easy"	Jim Grady	3:42
5.	"I'm Your New Best Friend"	Jim Grady, Dave Miller	3:04
6.	"Tropical Nights" / "Bali Ha'i"	Mark Winkler, Richard Rodgers, Oscar Hammerstein II	6:14
7.	"Take Me Through" / "I Could Come to Love You"	Jim Grady	4:30
8.	"Come Home Babe"	Jim Grady	3:24
9.	"A Beautiful Thing"	Jim Grady	3:24
Total length:			35:18

2017 Expanded Edition bonus tracks
No.	Title	Writer(s)	Length
10.	"More Than I Like You"	Peter Allen, Carole Bayer-Sager	2:55
11.	"Harbour"	Peter Allen, Carole Bayer-Sager	3:15
12.	"The Day After That"	John Kander, Fred Ebb	4:00
13.	"The Day After That" (Spanish Version)	John Kander, Fred Ebb	4:00
14.	"The Day After That" (French Version)	John Kander, Fred Ebb	4:00

== Personnel ==
- Paulinho da Costa – percussion

== Charts ==
Weekly charts for Tropical Nights
Chart (1977)	Peak position
US Top 200 Albums (Record World)	156
