= It Amazes Me =

1965 solo studio album by Liza Minnelli

Studio album by Liza Minnelli
- Released: May 10, 1965
- Recorded: December 1964–January 1965
- Studio: Capitol, New York City
- Genre: Pop, vocal, traditional
- Label: Capitol
- Producer: Simon Rady

Liza Minnelli chronology
Liza! Liza! (1964)	It Amazes Me (1965)	Flora the Red Menace (1965)

It Amazes Me is the second solo studio album by American singer and actress Liza Minnelli, released on May 10, 1965, by Capitol Records. The album features her interpretations of eleven pop standards, arranged and conducted by Peter Matz. It followed her debut for the label, Liza! Liza! (1964), and was recorded at Capitol Studios in New York between December 1964 and January 1965.

The album was produced during a period of heightened public visibility for Minnelli, who was simultaneously engaged in theater, television, and concert performances, including a high-profile appearance with her mother Judy Garland at the London Palladium. Capitol sought to capitalize on this momentum by positioning Minnelli as a rising interpreter of traditional pop material. The project was marked by a larger budget than her debut, with a fuller orchestral sound and a repertoire that blended Broadway selections with popular standards.

Upon release, It Amazes Me received favorable reviews from publications such as Billboard, High Fidelity, and Record World, which praised Minnelli's vocal control, interpretive sensitivity, and individuality. Although it did not chart on the main Billboard 200, the album appeared on Record World’s LPs Coming Up list and was later included in Cash Box’s Basic Album Inventory as a steady-selling catalog title. It has since been reissued in digital formats, including remastered editions in 2006 and 2009.

== Background ==
Following the release of her debut album for Capitol Records in September 1964, Liza Minnelli maintained a demanding schedule. Her activities included a national tour in a production of The Fantasticks alongside Elliott Gould, numerous television appearances, and a high-profile concert series in London co-headlining with her mother, Judy Garland, which was later released as Judy Garland and Liza Minnelli Live at the London Palladium.

Eager to capitalize on this increased visibility and public exposure, Capitol moved quickly to produce a follow-up album. The label's clear objective was to harness the momentum from her various engagements and replicate, if not surpass, the success of her first album. This strategic effort resulted in the sessions for her second Capitol release, It Amazes Me.

== Production and recording ==
The recording sessions for the album took place between December 1964 and January 1965. The project reunited the same team responsible for her debut album, Liza! Liza!, at Capitol Studios in New York, located at 151 West 46th Street. A larger budget on this occasion allowed for work with a bigger orchestra, once again under the direction of Peter Matz, who was in charge of the arrangements and orchestral treatment.

The repertoire demonstrates considerable variety. The title track, "It Amazes Me," is characterized by a more restrained interpretation, while other tracks explore different styles. For instance, influences of Garland and Streisand are noted on "My Shining Hour," and "Wait Till You See Him" features an arrangement that echoes the Latin percussion from Garland's recording of "Come Rain or Come Shine" with Nelson Riddle. An additional track, the medley Walk Right In / How Come You Do Me Like You Do?, was recorded during the sessions but was ultimately excluded from the final tracklist, later appearing on compilations.

The album's cover prominently promoted its sound quality, boasting about Capitol's "New Improved Full Dimensional Sound" technology with the slogan "sounds better than stereo has ever sounded before!".

== Release details ==
On April 24, 1965, Billboard featured a Capitol Records advertisement announcing Minnelli's second album with the label, revealing its title would be It Amazes Me. The album was released in May, as confirmed by Billboard and Record World in the same month.

In 2006, DRG Records released The Complete Capitol Collection compact disc (CD), which featured the album remixed and remastered in 24-bit from the original multi-track session tapes. According to producer Scott Schechter, this process removed a layer of reverb present on the original vinyl, resulting in a cleaner, warmer, and brighter sound that gives Liza's voice greater presence, as if she were singing directly to the listener in the same room.

In 2009, EMI Gold included the album in the double-CD compilation titled Finest (catalog no. 50999 6 98870 2 4). The tracks from this album were mastered from the original two-track stereo tapes used by Capitol to produce the vinyl records, with the goal of presenting the recordings in a digital format exactly as they were originally released.

== Critical reception ==
Professional ratings
Review scores
Source	Rating
AllMusic	3.5/5 stars

In its Pop Spotlight column, Billboard praised It Amazes Me, noting that relative newcomer Liza Minnelli approaches her second album "in the stride of a pro". The review highlighted her "tremendous control, feel for lyric, sincerity and sensitivity" in interpreting the standard material, which it categorized as demanding "singer's songs". The magazine concluded that Minnelli and her team treated the special repertoire in a way that was both "commercially" viable and "artistically" accomplished.

High Fidelity magazine wrote that although Minnelli bears a resemblance to her mother, "she possesses her own way of emotional projection", which includes humor and a powerful voice. In its review, Record World stated that Minnelli was born with "store houses of talent" that she puts "to good use" on the album. The publication noted that her performance across the carefully selected songs is "raucous, gentle, thoughtful, [and] playful", and highlighted tracks such as "Look at You", "Lorelei", "I Never Has Seen Snow", and "I Like the Likes of You" as benefiting from the singer's "ebullience".

In a retrospective review William Ruhlmann of AllMusic wrote that the album was created to compete with singer and actress Barbra Streisand, to the point that the arrangements and song selection resembled the material Streisand was doing at that time. He noted that the tastes of producer Peter Matz were evident in the song choices, which prioritized obscure Broadway songs. He concluded by stating that "the LP as a whole was another solid effort by a young but clearly talented artist".

== Commercial performance ==
It Amazes Me appeared on Record World's "LPs Coming Up" list, which featured albums that had not yet entered the magazine's Top 100, but were already generating measurable sales. The album reached number 29 on the list on June 12, 1965, and number 32 on June 19, 1965. Later, the magazine reported on December 25, 1965, that the release "spurred remarkable sales".

In June 1966, the album was included in the "Basic Album Inventory" published by Cash Box magazine, a weekly checklist highlighting steady-selling catalog albums that were not listed on the magazine's Top 100 Album Chart. The feature was intended to inform wholesalers and retailers of key titles that continued to generate consistent sales. It reappeared on October 1, 1966, returned again on January 14, 1967, and made its final entry on May 6, 1967.

== Track listing ==
It Amazes Me
No.	Title	Writer(s)	Length
1.	"Wait Till You See Him"	Richard Rodgers, Lorenz Hart	2:40
2.	"My Shining Hour"	Johnny Mercer, Harold Arlen	3:15
3.	"I Like the Likes of You"	Vernon Duke, Yip Harburg	2:15
4.	"It Amazes Me"	Cy Coleman, Carolyn Leigh	3:06
5.	"Looking at You"	Cole Porter	2:37
6.	"I Never Has Seen Snow"	Harold Arlen, Truman Capote	5:00
7.	"Plenty of Time"	John Kander, Fred Ebb	4:13
8.	"For Every Man There's a Woman"	Harold Arlen, Leo Robin	2:37
9.	"Lorelei"	George Gershwin, Ira Gershwin	2:32
10.	"Shouldn't There Be Lightning?"	Larry Alexander, Billy Goldenberg	3:05
11.	"Nobody Knows You When You're Down and Out"	Jimmy Cox	2:45

It Amazes Me – Digital album bonus tracks
No.	Title	Writer(s)	Length
12.	"Medley: Walk Right In / How Come You Do Me Like You Do?"	Hosea Woods, Gus Cannon, Bill Svanoe, Erik Darling, Gene Austin, Roy Bergere	3:01
13.	"A Quiet Thing" (Capitol single A-side #5411)	John Kander; Fred Ebb	2:41
14.	"All I Need" (Capitol single B-side #5411)	John Kander; Fred Ebb	2:41
15.	"Imprevu" (Capitol single A-side #5473)	Johnny Richards, Bob Crewe	3:02
16.	"Did I Hurt Your Feelings?" (Capitol single B-side #5473)	Bob Crewe, Richard Bondi	3:07
17.	"Sing Happy"	John Kander; Fred Ebb	3:18
18.	"Dear Love"	John Kander; Fred Ebb	2:42
19.	"I'm Not Laughing"	Bob Crewe; R. Bondi	2:50

== Personnel ==
Credits adapted from liner notes of It Amazes Me LP (Capitol, catalog no. ST-2271).

- Arranged By – Peter Matz
- Conductor – Peter Matz
- Liner Notes – John Sowerwine
- Photography By – Harry Gittes
- Producer – Si Rady

== Charts ==
Weekly charts for It Amazes Me.
Chart (1965)	Peak position
US LP's Coming Up (Record World)	29
