= Live at the Winter Garden =

Live album by Liza Minnelli
- Released: April 19, 1974
- Recorded: January 1974
- Genre: Pop, vocal, traditional pop
- Label: Columbia
- Producer: Gary Klein

Liza Minnelli chronology
| The Liza Minnelli Foursider (1973) | Live at the Winter Garden (1974) | Lucky Lady (1976) |

Alternative cover
- Cover of the 2012 CD re-release

Live at the Winter Garden is the second live album by American singer and actress Liza Minnelli, released in 1974 by Columbia Records. It was recorded during her Liza tour at the Winter Garden Theatre in New York City and initially promoted through magazines like Billboard. The album was quickly withdrawn due to contractual issues with songs from the Cabaret soundtrack, making it a rare title until its official re-release in 2012 on CD and digital formats, including three bonus tracks.

Directed by Bob Fosse with choreography by Ron Lewis and musical direction by Marvin Hamlisch, the performances feature songs by John Kander and Fred Ebb alongside classics from the Great American Songbook. Minnelli's interpretations of both her signature songs and older standards were praised by critics.

Commercially, the album spent four weeks on the Billboard 200, peaking at number 150. Following the 2012 reissue, it reached number 5 on the Billboard Top Cast Album chart, marking its first chart appearance in decades.

== Background ==
=== Liza tour ===
Bob Fosse is credited as the director. He had previously directed Minnelli in the 1972 film Cabaret, for which she received an Academy Award in the Best Actress category. Collaborating with Fosse, Ron Lewis served as the choreographer. Marvin Hamlisch was the musical director, and the songwriting duo John Kander and Fred Ebb contributed with original songs.

Regarding the show, the singer said, "The thing about doing a show like 'Liza' is that every song means something... Fred and John were so brilliant in constructing the show, plus I had Marvin, so we tried all kinds of vocals and finally got what you hear on the album, and thank God it worked! You keep trying, and you're not satisfied with anything less than the best."

In the selection of tracks included in the set list, Minnelli sings re-creations of her already classic songs, such as the pot-pourri from Cabaret, as well as songs from the Great American Songbook, like "Shine On Harvest Moon". Regarding the inclusion of older songs, some sung by her mother, she said, "For me, there are no new or old songs. There's just good music and good lyrics. In general, I choose songs for my repertoire more for the words than for the melody. And I don't look for just beautiful words. I like lyrics that tell a story, if possible with a beginning, middle, and end. Those are the songs that best reflect the yearnings and feelings of the audience, the ones that capture their attention the most because they are part of everyone's life".

=== Box office ===
Within thirty-six hours after the opening of the box office at the Winter Garden Theatre, all seats for the three-week run had been sold. To celebrate the success, the singer's father, director Vincent Minnelli, gathered over 350 people at the Rainbow Room Center (located on the 65th floor of 30 Rockefeller Plaza at the Rockefeller Center in Midtown Manhattan, New York City), despite initially expecting only a few guests.

== Album details ==
The recording took place during some of the shows of the tour titled Liza, which consisted of 24 shows held at the Winter Garden Theatre, located at 1634 Broadway in the heart of Manhattan, New York City. The LP was released in April 1974, and the promotion included full-page advertisements in American magazines, such as Billboard magazine.

Due to contractual conflicts, the album was withdrawn from circulation shortly afterward because it included songs from the film Cabaret, whose soundtrack was still in the market. Thus, it became a rare – and even considered lost – title in Liza's discography. Eleven of the fourteen tracks from the soundtrack appeared on the compilation Cabaret... And All That Jazz, released by Salvo.

In 2012, Masterworks Broadway released the album in its entirety on compact disc (CD) and digital download, marking the first time the performance was officially available in these formats. Three live bonus tracks were also part of the re-release, including "You and I" by Stevie Wonder and the classics "It Had to Be You" and "My Shining Hour."

== Critical reception ==
Professional ratings
Review scores
| Source | Rating |
|---|---|
| Allmusic | 3.5/5 stars |

Billboard described Live at the Winter Garden as an "absolutely brilliant" recording that fully captures the energy of Minnelli's live performance. The review praised her dynamic and versatile voice, which shines across pop, standards, rock, and show tunes. Highlighted tracks included "Exactly Like Me," "Natural Man," "I Can See Clearly Now," and "Cabaret." The magazine emphasized that the album reinforces Minnelli's status as a major star, demonstrating that her talent on record matches her celebrated stage and screen presence.

Record World praised the record for capturing Minnelli's vibrant Broadway performance, highlighting her energetic and passionate interpretations of songs such as "More Than You Know", "Natural Man", and "Cabaret". The review described her as radiant from start to finish, emphasizing her charismatic stage presence.

In a contemporary review, William Ruhlmann of AllMusic wrote that the album brings "a typically effective live performance by Minnelli and clearly just a memory of the actual show that could only be completed by seeing and hearing her".

== Commercial performance ==
Commercially, it spent four weeks on the Billboard 200 chart in the United States. It debuted at number 188 on May 18, 1974, and reached its peak at number 150 on June 1, 1974. The album debuted on the Cash Box best-selling albums chart on May 18, 1974, at number 168. It subsequently peaked at number 133 and remained on the chart for a total of six weeks. It also entered the Record World best-selling albums chart at number 137 on May 25, 1974, reaching its peak position of number 115 on June 15, 1974.

With the 2012 re-release, the album reappeared on the Billboard Top Cast Album chart, reaching number 5 on May 26, 2012. The following week, it remained in the same position, marking its last appearance on the chart.

== Track listing ==
| No. | Title | Writer(s) | Producer(s) | Length |
|---|---|---|---|---|
| 1. | "Overture: "Liza with a 'Z'" / "Ring Them Bells" / "I Can See Clearly Now" / "Maybe This Time" / "Cabaret"" | John Kander; Fred Ebb / John Kander; Fred Ebb / Johnny Nash / John Kander; Fred Ebb / John Kander; Fred Ebb | Gary Klein | 3:38 |
| 2. | "If You Could Read My Mind / Come Back To Me" | Gordon Lightfoot / Burton Lane; Alan Jay Lerner | Gary Klein | 2:56 |
| 3. | "Shine On Harvest Moon" | Nora Bayes; Jack Norworth | Gary Klein | 3:58 |
| 4. | "Exactly Like Me" | John Kander; Fred Ebb | Gary Klein | 4:33 |
| 5. | "The Circle" | Edith Piaf; Fred Ebb | Gary Klein | 4:00 |
| 6. | "More Than You Know" | Vincent Youmans; Billy Rose; Edward Eliscu | Gary Klein | 4:51 |
| 7. | "I'm One of the Smart Ones" | John Kander; Fred Ebb | Gary Klein | 4:38 |
| 8. | "Natural Man" | Bobby Hebb; Sandy Baron | Gary Klein | 3:40 |
| 9. | "I Can See Clearly Now" | Johnny Nash | Gary Klein | 4:31 |
| 10. | "And I In My Chair (Et Moi Dans Mon Coin)" | Charles Aznavour; Fred Ebb; David Newburge | Gary Klein | 4:40 |
| 11. | "There Is A Time (Le Temps)" | Gene Lees, Charles Aznavour; Jeff Davis | Gary Klein | 2:11 |
| 12. | "Quiet Thing" | John Kander; Fred Ebb | Gary Klein | 4:34 |
| 13. | "Anywhere You Are / I Believe You" | John Kander; Fred Ebb | Gary Klein | 3:33 |
| 14. | "Cabaret / Curtain Bows: Cabaret" | John Kander; Fred Ebb | Gary Klein | 4:25 |
| 15. | "You And I" (Bonus Track CD Version) | Stevie Wonder | Gary Klein | 3:34 |
| 16. | "It Had to Be You" (Bonus Track CD Version) | Isham Jones; Gus Kahn | Gary Klein | 5:32 |
| 17. | "My Shining Hour" (Bonus Track CD Version) | Harold Arlen; Johnny Mercer | Gary Klein | 4:05 |
| Total length: | | | | 01:07:56 |

== Personnel ==
- Produced by: Gary Klein
- Arranged by: Ralph Burns, Billy Eyers, Jack French, Jonathan Tunick, Billy Reddy, Peter Matz & Fred Werner
- Remote Engineer: Phil Ramone
- Remix & Editing Engineer: Don Puluse
- Location engineers: Aaron Baron, Larry Dahlstrom
- Recordists: Hank Altman, Tom Dwyer
- Cover illustration: Joe Eula
- Back cover photos: Arthur Maillot, Robert Deutsch
- Back cover design: Karen Lee Grant

=== Musicians ===
- Rhythm: Arthur Azenzer, Frank Bruno, Norman Jeffries, Don De Marco, Jack Cavari
- Brass: Al Di Risi, John Frosk, Lew Gluckin, Ronald Keller, Vincent Fanuele, Wayne Andre, Fred Zito
- Woodwinds: Al Ragni, Dennis Anderson, Lewis Del Gatto, Walter Kane
- Strings: Max Cahn, Tobias Bloom, Joseph Goodman, Marie Hence, Elmar Ollveira, Ian Wint, Sandra Robbins, Nina Simon, Maurice Brown, Bernard Fennell
- Percussion: Eric Cohen, Charles Roeder
- Orchestra personnel manager: Earl Shendell

== Charts ==
Weekly chart for Live at the Winter Garden
| Chart (1974) | Peak position |
|---|---|
| US Billboard 200 | 150 |
| US Top 100 Albums (Cash Box) | 133 |
| US The Album Chart (Record World) | 115 |
