= Live at Carnegie Hall (Liza Minnelli album) =

Live album by Liza Minnelli
- Released: August 1981
- Recorded: September 1979
- Venues: Carnegie Hall, New York City
- Genre: Vocal pop
- Length: 74:19
- Label: Altel Sound Systems
- Producers: Hank Cattaneo; Bill Lavorgna

Liza Minnelli chronology
The Act (1978)	Live at Carnegie Hall (1981)	Liza Minnelli (1982)

Live at Carnegie Hall is the fourth live album by American singer Liza Minnelli. It was originally released in 1981 by the independent label Altel Sound Systems, marking her only collaboration with the company. The album was recorded during a series of sold-out concerts at Carnegie Hall in September 1979.

Carnegie Hall carried strong personal significance for Minnelli, as her mother Judy Garland had made a historic return to the same venue in 1961 as documented on her second live album. After the success of her Broadway show The Act, Minnelli sought to create a new stage presentation for these concerts, working with collaborators such as Fred Ebb, Wayne Cilento and Ron Lewis to design a theatrical performance that combined song, choreography, and dramatic interpretation.

Initially self-distributed, the double album was sold in limited quantities at Minnelli's live performances. Real Gone Music reissued the recording in 2022 as Live in New York 1979 both in red vinyl as well as a three-CD box set containing the complete concert for the first time.

== Background ==
Carnegie Hall held great significance in Minnelli's family, as her mother, also a singer and an actress Judy Garland, made her triumphant return there 18 years earlier in an event that some call "the greatest night in showbiz history". In this context, Minnelli had a desire to return with a new season of shows after her successful performances in the musical The Act. However, she didn't want to return with the same nightclub act she had been doing for years; she wanted innovations.

With the help of her dedicated team, including Fred Ebb (the writer, producer, and director of the show), Wayne Cilento and Ron Lewis (choreographer), Lawrence Miller (set designer), and Mark Gero as her production manager, Minnelli set out to surprise with her new tour. In an interview, she stated, "I wanted to turn my shows at Carnegie Hall into a presentation theater," adding, "I wanted each song to be a complete acting piece; a complete character. I wanted Carnegie Hall to be my baby".

== Production and recording ==
The album was produced by Hank Cattaneo and Bill LaVorgna, with recordings taking place in the Carnegie Hall concert hall, located in Midtown Manhattan, New York City, in September 1979. The show in question was one of the eleven sold-out performances in Minnelli's series at the venue.

The cover was created from one of the portraits from Minnelli's collection, created by the American Pop artist Andy Warhol.

== Release details ==
At the time of the release, Minnelli was not affiliated with a major record label, so she recorded these concerts and released them independently. Two years later, in 1981, she began selling the limited edition of the double album at her live performances.

Real Gone Music record label renamed the album Live in New York 1979 for a 2021 limited edition pink vinyl reissue of 1,400 copies. The renamed album was subsequently released in 2022 as a 3-CD edition including the complete show for the first time, together with the legacy version previously released on vinyl.

== Critical reception ==
Will Friedwald of The Wall Street Journal wrote that the show "was not Mrs. Minnelli's final act – or even the halfway point – but it was the climax of a moment in cultural history. The AIDS epidemic would soon end the festivities, but, as captured by Liza Minnelli at Carnegie in 1979, it was the greatest party in history." Regarding Minnelli's performance, he stated: "Mrs. Minnelli's supreme power may well be her extreme sensuality – she's openly sexy in a way that almost no theatrical diva ever is" closer to Peggy Lee or Julie London. You can't help but notice this in two songs written by Ebb and John Kander for her starring role in "The Act": In "City Lights" – an even better vehicle for her than the more famous "Theme from 'New York, New York'" – she sings not only of her love for her adopted city, but a kind of lust for it."

Stephen Mosher of BroadwayWorld considered Minnelli's performances of "Cabaret," "New York, New York," "City Lights," and "But The World Goes Round" electrifying. He stated that the singer is in great vocal shape throughout the entire concert, and "as, song by song, monologue by monologue, Liza Minnelli takes the listener on a series of intriguing paths, her ability to tell the stories she brought to the stage shines brightly, resonating with individuality and originality." He concluded by saying that "from start to finish, [the album] is not only one of the best albums by Liza Minnelli to be released on CD, not only one of the best concert albums to be recorded, produced, remastered, and re-released after an uncomfortable four-decade wait, it's simply one of the best albums, period."

== Commercial performance ==
According to The Ledger (December 11, 1981), Live at Carnegie Hall was initially sold independently in New York as a test market release. Out of 500 copies made available at the Colony Record Shop on Broadway, 200 were sold on the first day.

== Track listing ==
Side one
No.	Title	Writer(s)	Length
1.	"How Long Has This Been Going On? / It's a Miracle"	George Gershwin, Ira Gershwin / Barry Manilow, Marty Panzer
2.	"My Ship / The Man I Love"	Kurt Weill, Ira Gershwin / George Gershwin, Ira Gershwin
3.	"Some People"	Jule Styne, Stephen Sondheim
4.	"Come in from the Rain"	Melissa Manchester, Carole Bayer Sager

Side two
No.	Title	Writer(s)	Length
1.	"London Town"	Fred Ebb, Paul Klein, Lee Goldsmith
2.	"New York Medley: I Guess The Lord Must Be in New York City / Take Me Back to Manhattan / Manhattan / New York City Rhythm / 42nd Street / Lullaby of Broadway / On Broadway / New York City / Every Street's a Boulevard / Theme from New York City"	Harry Nilsson / Cole Porter / Richard Rodgers, Lorenz Hart / Barry Manilow, Marty Panzer / Harry Warren, Al Dubin / Barry Mann, Cynthia Weil, Jerry Leiber and Mike Stoller / Leonard Bernstein, Betty Comden, Adolph Green / Jule Styne, B. Hillyard / John Kander, Fred Ebb

Side three
No.	Title	Writer(s)	Length
1.	"Someone to Watch Over Me"	George Gershwin, Ira Gershwin
2.	"Twelve Fellas"	Fred Ebb, Larry Grossman
3.	"You & I / Honeymoon Is Over / Happy Anniversary"	Leslie Bricusse / Harvey Schmidt, Tom Jones / Charles Aznavour, Fred Ebb
4.	"City Lights"	John Kander, Fred Ebb

Side four
No.	Title	Writer(s)	Length
1.	"Cabaret"	John Kander, Fred Ebb
2.	"Shine On Harvest Moon"	Nora Bayes, Jack Norworth
3.	"But the World Goes Round"	John Kander, Fred Ebb
4.	"Bows (Liza/Liza)"	George Gershwin, Ira Gershwin

== Personnel ==
- Arranged by Bill Byers, Michael Abene, Ralph Burns
- Conducted by Bill Lavorgna
- Recorded by David Hewitt on the Record Plant NY Black Truck
- Produced by Hank Cattaneo & Bill Lavorgna

Musicians

- Victor Paz – trumpet
- Ross Konikoff – trumpet
- Harry DeVito – trombone
- Arnie Lawrence – alto saxophone
- Lawrence Feldman – tenor saxophone
- Kenny Berger – baritone saxophone
- Bill LaVorgna – drummer, conductor
- Jay Leonhart – bass
- Rick Leowes – guitar
- Dave Cox – percussion
- Steve Tubin – keyboards
- Pat Rebillot – piano
