= Ring Them Bells =

Ring Them Bells may refer to:

- Ring Them Bells (album), an album by Joan Baez
- "Ring Them Bells" (song), a song by Bob Dylan
- "Ring Them Bells", a song by Kander and Ebb appearing on the concert album Liza with a Z.
