= The Act (cast recording) =

Soundtrack album by Liza Minnelli
- Released: June 1978
- Genre: Show tunes, traditional pop
- Label: DRG

Liza Minnelli chronology
New York, New York (1977)	The Act (1978)	Live at Carnegie Hall (1981)

The Act is the original cast recording to musical drama of the same name, starring Liza Minnelli, with music and lyrics by John Kander and Fred Ebb. The album documents Minnelli's return to a Broadway vehicle after a 12-year absence, featuring her performance as a fading film star attempting a Las Vegas comeback. Recorded in a single marathon session at New York's A&R Recording Studios in April 1978, the cast album underwent an unusual production history. While originally slated for release by Columbia Records, it was ultimately produced by Hugh Fordin's DRG Records and distributed nationally through a manufacturing and marketing agreement with RCA Records.

The recording presents Kander and Ebb's contemporary 1970s-infused score, which incorporated disco rhythms and electric guitar elements, departing from their characteristic period works. For the album, songs were edited to remove dialogue and trimmed to conventional song structures, with the track sequence reorganized from the stage production. The commercial release was promoted following Minnelli's Tony Award for Best Actress in a Musical , though the show itself had received mixed critical reception. The cast album had a brief chart appearance, peaking at number 188 on the Cash Box Top Albums chart, and has been reissued multiple times, often repackaged as a Liza Minnelli solo album rather than as an original cast recording.

== Overview ==
The Act represented Liza Minnelli's return to a Broadway vehicle for the first time in 12 years, opening on October 29, 1977. The musical, with a score by John Kander and Fred Ebb, presented a backstage story about a fading film star attempting a Las Vegas comeback. Its plot functioned as a framework for its star to perform a succession of new songs. With the sole exception of the choral number "Little Do They Know", Minnelli performed every song in the production.

Departing from Kander and Ebb's frequent period settings, the show was set in the contemporary 1970s. Its score incorporated elements of the time, such as disco rhythms and electric guitar. The ensuing cast album features Minnelli's performances of these songs. The production ran for 233 performances over eight months. While the show itself did not win a Tony Awards, Minnelli received the Tony Award for Best Actress in a Musical for her performance.

The cast album for The Act was recorded in a single day during an eleven-hour session at New York's A&R Recording Studios in April 1978. It was produced by Hugh Fordin. The LP includes all of the songs from the score (with the exception of "Hollywood, California" which was cut after opening night) performed by the original Broadway cast. For the cast recording, several musical numbers were edited, removing dialogue and trimming the arrangements to a more conventional song structure. The sequence of songs was also altered from the stage production; notably, "My Own Space" was repositioned from its place as a faux-encore after the finale, "Walking Papers", into the main track listing. A distinctive feature of the recording is composer John Kander's personal contribution, as he provides the piano accompaniment on "My Own Space".

== Release details ==
While originally intended for release by Columbia Records, the label dropped its option after the show received negative reviews, coinciding with the expiration of Liza Minnelli's contract. According to trade publications in early June 1978, DRG Records, led by Hugh Fordin, subsequently acquired the rights and produced the album. On June 3, 1978, Billboard reported that a distribution agreement was finalized for the original cast album, between RCA Records and the newly-formed DRG Records. The pact, announced by Mel Ilberman, division vice president of business affairs and associated labels for RCA, and Hugh Fordin, president of DRG Records, stipulated that RCA would be responsible for the manufacturing and marketing of the album. This partnership secured the commercial release for the production's soundtrack.

In its June 17, 1978 issue, Billboard reported that RCA had released the original cast album for The Act and would actively promote the album. In its September 27, 1986 issue, the same magazine noted the album's release on compact disc (CD), under catalog number CDRG 6101. Subsequent reissues by other labels often rebranded the album, altering the artwork and frequently marketing it as a Liza Minnelli solo album instead of an Original Broadway Cast Recording.

== Critical reception ==
Professional ratings
Review scores
Source	Rating
AllMusic	2.5/5 stars

Cash Box highlighted Liza Minnelli's "superb artistry" and "inspired, emotional vocals" throughout the album. The magazine praised the "sensitive, exquisitely-executed numbers" such as "There When I Need Him" and "It's The Strangest Thing", concluding that the album constituted a "valuable contemporary adult package".

William Ruhlmann of AllMusic noted that while the score was by her favored team of Kander and Ebb, the contemporary setting worked against them. He argued that Kander lacked a feel for 1970s music, and Ebb's inherent cynicism clashed with Minnelli's trademark optimism. As a result, Ruhlmann felt the score failed the star, and the album sounded like "little more than a Minnelli solo recording" with only the faintest indication of its theatrical origins.

== Commercial performance ==
The Act entered the Cash Box Top Albums chart on July 1, 1978, debuting at number 192. It charted for a total of three weeks, reaching its peak position of 188 on July 15. This was its final appearance on the chart.

== Track listing ==
The Act – Original Broadway Cast
No.	Title	Writer(s)	Performer(s)	Length
1.	"Shine It On"	John Kander, Fred Ebb	Liza Minnelli with Chorus	3:46
2.	"It's the Strangest Thing"	John Kander, Fred Ebb	Liza Minnelli	3:06
3.	"Bobo's"	John Kander, Fred Ebb	Liza Minnelli	4:20
4.	"Turning"	John Kander, Fred Ebb	Liza Minnelli with Chorus	2:49
5.	"Little Do They Know"	John Kander, Fred Ebb	Liza Minnelli	2:46
6.	"Arthur in the Afternoon"	John Kander, Fred Ebb	Liza Minnelli	4:02
7.	"The Money Tree"	John Kander, Fred Ebb	Liza Minnelli	4:00
8.	"City Lights"	John Kander, Fred Ebb	Liza Minnelli with Chorus	6:23
9.	"There When I Need Him"	John Kander, Fred Ebb	Liza Minnelli	4:22
10.	"Hot Enough for You?"	John Kander, Fred Ebb	Liza Minnelli with Chorus	2:11
11.	"Little Do They Know (Reprise)"	John Kander, Fred Ebb	Liza Minnelli	1:18
12.	"My Own Space" (Piano – John Kander)	John Kander, Fred Ebb	Liza Minnelli	3:54
13.	"Walking Papers"	John Kander, Fred Ebb	Liza Minnelli	4:41

== Personnel ==
Credits adapted from The Act 1978 LP.

- Art Direction by Rupert Finegold
- Copyist [Music Preparation Supervisor] – Al Miller, Mathilde Pincus
- Engineer – Burt Szerlip
- Lyrics by Fred Ebb
- Music by John Kander
- Performer [Cast] – Albert Stephenson, Arnold Soboloff, Barry Nelson, Carol Estey, Christopher Barrett, Danny Buraczeski, Gayle Crofoot, Laurie Dawn Skinner, Liza Minnelli, Mark Goddard, Michael Leeds, Roger Minami
- Photography [All Original Production] by Martha Swope
- Producer – Hugh Fordin
- Producer [Production Associates] – Richard Seff, Rick Winter
- Script [Book] by George Furth
- Written by Kander and Ebb

== Charts ==
Weekly charts for The Act.
Chart (1978)	Peak position
US Top Albums (Cash Box)	188
