= My Shining Hour =

1943 song by Harold Arlen and Johnny Mercer

"My Shining Hour" is a song composed by Harold Arlen with lyrics by Johnny Mercer for the film The Sky's the Limit (1943). In the film, the song is sung by Fred Astaire and Sally Sweetland, who dubbed it for actress Joan Leslie. The orchestra was led by Freddie Slack. "My Shining Hour" was nominated for an Academy Award for Best Song but lost to "You'll Never Know".

The film was released on July 13, 1943. The song became a hit the following year by Glen Gray's Casa Loma Orchestra with Eugenie Baird as vocalist, reaching No. 4 on the Billboard "Best Selling Retail Records" chart. The song's title may have been a reference to Winston Churchill's speech to British citizens during World War II: "if the British Empire and its Commonwealth last for a thousand years, men will still say, this was their finest hour."

In the 1944 film Youth Runs Wild an instrumental version of the song plays during a scene with Kent Smith and Glen Vernon. The song was also used in the film Radio Stars on Parade (1945), where it was sung by Frances Langford accompanied by the Skinnay Ennis orchestra. An instrumental version of the song was used in The Bachelor and the Bobby-Soxer (1947).

== Other notable recordings ==
- 1943: Mabel Mercer
- 1955: Warren Galjour, The Music Of Harold Arlen: The Walden Sessions
- 1960: Ella Fitzgerald, Ella Fitzgerald Sings the Harold Arlen Songbook
- 1961: John Coltrane, Coltrane Jazz
- 1965: Liza Minnelli, It Amazes Me
- 1977: June Christy, Impromptu
- 1980: Frank Sinatra, Trilogy: Past Present Future
- 1983: Rosemary Clooney, Rosemary Clooney Sings the Music of Harold Arlen
- 1993: Peggy Lee, Love Held Lightly: Rare Songs by Harold Arlen
