= Liza with a Z (album) =

Liza with a "Z"
- CD album cover

Soundtrack album by Liza Minnelli
- Released: September 10, 1972
- Recorded: May 1972
- Genre: Showtunes; traditional pop
- Length: 48:42
- Label: Columbia
- Producer: Andrew Kazdin

Liza Minnelli chronology
Cabaret (1972)	Liza with a "Z" (1972)	The Singer (1973)

Liza with a "Z" is the soundtrack album accompanying the 1972 televised concert special of the same name, starring Liza Minnelli. The special was directed and choreographed by Bob Fosse, produced by Fred Ebb, and featured music by Kander and Ebb, along with selections from the American Songbook. Recorded live at the Lyceum Theatre in New York City on May 31, 1972, the album was released later that year by Columbia Records in multiple formats, including a CD edition in 1993 and a remastered release in 2006 alongside the restored DVD of the television special.

The soundtrack received positive critical attention upon release, with reviewers highlighting Minnelli's performances of "Ring them Bells", "God Bless the Child" and the extended "Cabaret Medley". Commercially, it became Minnelli's highest-charting album in the United States, peaking at number 19 on the Billboard 200.

== Background ==
The special Liza with a "Z" was produced by Fred Ebb, directed and choreographed by Bob Fosse, and featured music by John Kander and Fred Ebb alongside selections from the American songbook. The concert was originally broadcast on NBC in September 1972 and the soundtrack LP was released by Columbia Records the same year.

The audio for Liza with a Z was recorded live on May 31, 1972, at the Lyceum Theatre in New York City, during the filming of the television special. The recording was supervised by producer Phil Ramone, who captured the concert using multitrack equipment in addition to the mono mix that was standard for broadcast at the time. This allowed the individual components of the performance, including Minnelli's vocals and the orchestra, to be preserved separately, providing a source for later remastering.

== Release ==
The album was released in 1972, by Columbia in LP record (KC 31762), 8-Track Cartridge (CA 31762), and cassette tape (CT 31762).

In 1993, the album was re-released on CD in Europe by Columbia under the catalog number 982994 2, as part of the Columbia Collectors Choice series. The reissue took place twenty years after the original release, a period during which the album had been out of print. In 2003, Sony International released the album together with The Singer (1973) on a two-disc set. AllMusic rated the compilation three out of five stars.

There are two differences between the 1972 original and the reissue; the first is that "Son of a Preacher Man" and "Ring Them Bells" were placed in the correct performance order for the reissue. The original release had the two songs in reverse order. The second difference is that the original had a twelfth track, entitled "Bows". For the reissue, this track was mixed into the end of the previous track. A CD of the stereo soundtrack was simultaneously released alongside the film's 2006 DVD release (catalog no. 82876 78812 2).

== Critical reception ==
Soundtrack reviews
Review scores
Source	Rating
AllMusic	4.5/5 stars
Music Week	4/5 stars

Billboard noted that the Liza with a "Z" soundtrack "totally captures the electricity and the bundle of talent" of Minnelli's television special".Gramophone wrote that "this was not just a cabaret performance but a properly constructed revue", praising it as "a record of a great theatrical occasion" in which Liza Minnelli "is unique and so is this wonderful recording". Record World wrote that the album includes "a brilliant medley from 'Cabaret'" and "stunning performances", concluding with "fabulous singing!".

In a retrospective review, Richie Unterberger of AllMusic wrote that "much of the impact of a program by a performer such as Liza Minnelli is lost in an audio-only document", although the album "showcase[s] her versatility".

== Commercial performance ==
The album debuted at number 86 on the Billboard 200 on September 30, 1972, and reached its peak position at number 19 on the November 25, 1972 issue, spending a total of 23 weeks on the chart. The album debuted on the Cash Box chart on September 30, 1972, at position number 132. In the following weeks, it gradually climbed to higher positions, reaching its peak on December 2, 1972, when it placed at number 29. After this performance, it steadily declined on the chart, making its final appearance on February 10, 1973, at position 168, after a total of 20 weeks on the chart. On the Record World chart, it reached position number 17 in its tenth week, on the chart dated December 9, 1972. It maintained this peak for the following week.

By May 1973, the album had sold 30,000 copies in the UK, selling 1,000 copies a day.

== Track listing ==
No.	Title	Writer(s)	Length
1.	"Yes"	Kander, Ebb	3:15
2.	"God Bless the Child"	Herzog, Holiday	3:07
3.	"Say Liza (Liza with a "Z")"	Kander, Ebb	3:06
4.	"It Was a Good Time"	Curb, David, Jarre	4:58
5.	"I Gotcha"	Tex	3:44
6.	"Son of a Preacher Man"	Hurley, Wilkins	3:25
7.	"Ring Them Bells"	Kander, Ebb	5:41
8.	"Bye Bye Blackbird"	Dixon, Henderson	3:57
9.	"You've Let Yourself Go"	Aznavour	3:56
10.	"My Mammy"	Donaldson, Lewis, Young	3:03
11.	"Cabaret Medley"	Kander, Ebb	10:21
12.	"Bows"	G. Gershwin, I. Gershwin, Kahn	0:30

== Personnel ==
Credits adapted from Liza With A "Z" LP liner notes (Columbia, 982994 2).

- Artwork [Cover] – Joe Eula
- Choreography – Bob Fosse
- Engineer – Arthur Kendy, Phil Ramone
- Producer – Andrew Kazdin

== Charts ==
Weekly chart performance for Liza with a Z.
Chart (1972–1973)	Peak position
Australia (Kent Music Report)	17
UK Albums (OCC)	9
Billboard 200	19
US Top 100 Albums (Cash Box)	29
US The Album Chart (Record World)	17

== Certifications and sales ==
Region	Certification	Certified units/sales
United Kingdom as of May 1973	—	30,000
United States (RIAA)	Gold	500,000^{^}
^{^} Shipments figures based on certification alone.
