= Live at the London Palladium (Judy Garland and Liza Minnelli album) =

1965 album recorded live by the artists Liza Minnelli and Judy Garland

"Live" at the London Palladium

Live album by Liza Minnelli and Judy Garland
- Released: July 25, 1965
- Recorded: November 8, 1964, and November 15, 1964
- Venue: London Palladium, London
- Genre: Pop, vocal, traditional
- Length: 78:51
- Label: Capitol
- Producer: Simon Rady

Liza Minnelli and Judy Garland chronology
| Flora the Red Menace (1965) | "Live" at the London Palladium (1965) | The Dangerous Christmas of Red Riding Hood (1965) |

Judy Garland chronology
| Judy Garland Sings Maggie May (EP) (1964) | "Live" at the London Palladium (1965) | Judy Garland at Home at the Palace: Opening Night (1965) |

Singles from "Live" at the London Palladium
- 1. "Hello, Liza! Hello, Mama!" Released: August 23, 1965

"Live" at the London Palladium is a live album by American singers Judy Garland and Liza Minnelli. It was released on July 25, 1965, by Capitol Records as a double LP, recorded during a pair of concerts held at the London Palladium in November 1964. The engagement marked the first major stage collaboration between Garland and Minnelli, and its release was promoted as a meeting of two generations of performers, bringing together Garland’s established reputation with Minnelli’s emerging career.

The concerts took place during a challenging period in Garland’s life. Following the abrupt cancellation of The Judy Garland Show in 1964, she continued performing internationally while contending with health issues and personal difficulties. The album performances featured a mix of Garland’s signature numbers, Broadway standards, and Minnelli’s early selections, blending solo turns with duets that showcased their familial and artistic bond.

Although widely anticipated, the production of the album was complicated by technical problems. A persistent buzz on the original concert tapes required both singers to return to Capitol’s London studios to re-record portions of the material. Capitol then edited the recordings heavily, condensing the shows into a more streamlined double album. Upon release, the record charted on Billboard 200 and other trade publications, generating attention both for its historic pairing and for the contrast between Garland’s declining vocal condition and Minnelli’s still-developing technique. The album has since been reissued in various forms, though the complete Palladium concerts remain officially unreleased.

== Background ==
In 1964, Judy Garland was going through a turbulent period in both her personal life and professional career. After the cancellation of her CBS television program, The Judy Garland Show, which lasted only one season, Garland traveled between international engagements while coping with fragile health, marital problems, and drug overdoses—one of which was mistakenly reported as her death by the press. Although still a beloved cultural figure, her voice showed clear signs of strain as a result of years of illness and treatment. That same year, Garland returned to the London Palladium in a landmark performance shared with her daughter, Liza Minnelli. Though only 18 and at the start of her career, Minnelli was already acclaimed for her performance in Flora the Red Menace.

The concert was conceived as both a family event and an artistic statement, presenting Garland’s enduring legacy alongside Minnelli’s debut on the international stage. Initially reluctant, Liza agreed to participate only after her mother had already publicly confirmed the dates. In a 2015 interview, Minnelli revealed that her mother tricked her into doing the shows. Garland asked Minnelli to come to London and perform with her, but she initially refused, feeling that she was too young and unprepared. Garland went ahead and announced the concert to the press, leaving Minnelli with no choice but to accept. She further revealed, "I had performed with Mama on her TV series, and as big as that was to me, it wasn't the same as standing on stage singing with her at the London Palladium. Listen, Mama dominated any stage she was on. So we did it, and it was great, exciting, and terrifying".

== Production and recording ==
The concerts were held on 8 and 15 November 1964, both recorded by Capitol Records, with the second show also videotaped and becoming the 55-minute program that aired on ITV British Television. While expectations were high for this generational collaboration, later critics observed that Garland was far from her vocal peak, and Minnelli had not yet fully developed her technique, resulting in a performance regarded as historic but uneven in artistic quality.

The Palladium shows featured a varied repertoire of solos and duets, blending Garland’s classics, Broadway standards, and Minnelli’s early numbers. Highlights included "The Man That Got Away", "Hello, Dolly!", "Together (Wherever We Go)", and "Theme from San Francisco". However, the recordings faced serious technical issues: during the filming of the second concert, the audio was compromised by a persistent buzz from the television equipment, rendering portions unusable. To salvage the project, Garland and Minnelli returned to Capitol’s London studios on 23 November 1964 to record overdubs. Garland re-recorded numbers such as "Just Once in a Lifetime" and "The Music That Makes Me Dance", while Minnelli replaced tracks like "Who's Sorry Now?" and her "Mama" tribute.

Even with these efforts, the problems were only partially resolved. Capitol heavily edited the original tapes, cutting numerous songs, reordering the setlist, and condensing the material into a more polished double LP. As a result, several performances were excluded, such as Minnelli’s "Maybe This Time" and "Rock-a-Bye Your Baby with a Dixie Melody", along with Garland’s "Maggie, Maggie May" and "Joey, Joey, Joey". Moreover, Garland’s fragile vocal condition demanded significant studio work, while Minnelli, still inexperienced, attempted vocal ranges beyond her capacity. The final product has been described as both a fascinating historical artifact and a flawed portrait of mother and daughter at transitional points in their careers.

== Release details ==
The double album Judy Garland and Liza Minnelli "Live" at the London Palladium was released in 1965 by Capitol Records in both mono and stereo editions. The record was also issued internationally, including in Germany and Argentina, where it appeared under the title En Vivo En El London Palladium.

Over the following decades, the album was reissued in abridged versions, such as Judy Garland and Liza Minnelli Together, and included in compilations like It Was a Good Time: The Best of Judy Garland & Liza Minnelli. In 1973, after years out of print, Capitol Records decided to reissue it in a condensed version that excluded 8 of the 19 tracks and drastically altered the song order from the original release. The release aimed to capitalize on Minnelli's visibility during that period: she won the Academy Award for Best Actress for her performance in Cabaret at the 1973 Oscars, and she graced the covers of major U.S. magazines.

Attempts to issue the complete concerts came in 2002, through Capitol, and again in 2009, through Collector’s Choice Music, both produced by Garland historian Scott Schechter. However, the 2002 edition was blocked by the Judy Garland Heirs Trust, which sought to protect Garland’s legacy, while the 2009 set was cancelled following Schechter’s sudden death just days before its scheduled release. A further plan to release the material in June 2009, marking the 40th anniversary of Garland’s death, was also abandoned. As a result, the full recordings of the two Palladium concerts remain unreleased, continuing to fuel debate among heirs, scholars, and fans over their historical and artistic significance.

== Critical reception ==
Professional ratings
Review scores
| Source | Rating |
|---|---|
| AllMusic | 3.5/5 stars |
| Record Mirror | 4/5 stars |

Record World wrote that the album was a showcase for the union of two talented artists, singing "some of the best songs of the century." He said that Garland was in good vocal form throughout the performance and singled out "When the Saints Go Marching In" and "He's Got the Whole World in His Hands" as highlights. Record Mirror praised Live at the London Palladium as one of the most memorable concerts ever staged at the venue, highlighting its emotional and dramatic qualities. The review noted that the double album captured not only the energy of the live performance but also the intimacy of Judy Garland’s delivery and the charm of her daughter Liza Minnelli. The critic emphasized the affectionate, warm, and enduring nature of the recording, describing it as a delightful and truly glorious set.

Regarding the condensed version, Record World critic wrote in 1973 that the combination of the two biggest artists of the time resulted in an "exciting" album with songs that were "magnificently interpreted." He highlighted songs such as "What Now My Love," "Gypsy In My Soul," and "Swanee". The critic from Cashbox wrote (about the condensed version) that although it was recorded in 1964, the recording should be considered as "a legacy of the great Judy Garland and her incredibly vibrant and talented daughter." His highlights from the tracklist included "What Now My Love," "Hello, Dolly," "Swanee," and "Over The Rainbow."

In a retrospective review, William Ruhlmann of AllMusic wrote that while the album is "welcome," "neither of the singers is heard at their best here." He noted that the best moments of the concert are when the two sing together, due to the remarkable chemistry between mother and daughter.

== Commercial performance ==
The album debuted at number 135 on the Billboard 200 chart. It reached its peak at number 41 on October 30, 1965. The condensed version debuted on the Billboard 200 on June 9, 1973, at number 191. It reached its peak at number 164 on July 7, 1973, spending a total of 8 weeks on the chart.

In the Record World best-selling albums chart, it peaked at number 45 on October 30, 1965. In the Cash Box Top 100 Albums chart, in the October 2, 1965, edition, it reached its peak at number 65.

== Track listing ==
Side one
| No. | Title | Writer(s) | Length |
|---|---|---|---|
| 1. | "Overture: Over the Rainbow / Never Will I Marry / What Now My Love / Liza (All the Clouds'll Roll Away) / The Travelin' Life / Smile / The Man That Got Away" | Harold Arlen; E.Y. Harburg; Frank Loesser; Gilbert Bécaud; Pierre Delanoë; Carl Sigman; George Gershwin; Ira Gershwin; Gus Kahn; Howard Liebling; Marvin Hamlisch; Charlie Chaplin; John Turner; Geoffrey Parsons | 3:06 |
| 2. | "The Man That Got Away" | Arlen; Gershwin | 4:21 |
| 3. | "The Travelin' Life" | Kahn; Liebling; Hamlisch | 3:22 |
| 4. | "Gypsy in My Soul" | Clay Boland; Moe Jaffe | 3:09 |
| 5. | "Hello, Dolly!" | Jerry Herman | 2:35 |
| 6. | "Together (Wherever We Go)" | Jule Styne; Stephen Sondheim | 1:08 |
| 7. | "Medley: We Could Make Such Beautiful Music / Bob White" | Henry Katzman; Robert Sour; Johnny Mercer; Bernard Hanighen | 1:49 |
| Total length: | | | 19:28 |

Side two
| No. | Title | Writer(s) | Length |
|---|---|---|---|
| 1. | "Medley: Hooray for Love / After You've Gone / By Myself / 'S Wonderful / How About You? / Lover, Come Back to Me / You and the Night and the Music / It All Depends on You" | Arlen; Leo Robin; Turner Layton; Henry Creamer; Arthur Schwartz; Howard Dietz; G. Gershwin; I. Gershwin; Burton Lane; Ralph Freed; Sigmund Romberg; Oscar Hammerstein II; Arthur Schwartz; Howard Dietz; Ray Henderson; Buddy G. DeSylva; Lew Brown | 4:51 |
| 2. | "Who's Sorry Now?" | Ted Snyder; Bert Kalmar; Harry Ruby | 3:21 |
| 3. | "Smile" | Chaplin; Turner; Parsons | 3:09 |
| 4. | "How Could You Believe Me When I Said I Love You When You Know I've Been a Liar All My Life?" | Burton Lane; Alan Jay Lerner | 3:24 |
| 5. | "What Now My Love" | Bécaud; Delanoë; Sigman | 3:56 |
| Total length: | | | 18:45 |

Side three
| No. | Title | Writer(s) | Length |
|---|---|---|---|
| 1. | "Liza's Medley: Take Me Along / If I Could Be with You / Tea for Two / Who? / They Can't Take That Away from Me / By Myself / Take Me Along / Mammy" | Bob Merrill; James P. Johnson; Creamer; Vincent Youmans; Irving Caesar; Jerome Kern; Otto Harbach; Hammerstein II; G. Gershwin; I. Gershwin; Schwartz; Dietz | 5:22 |
| 2. | "Make Someone Happy" | Styne; Betty Comden; Adolph Green | 2:23 |
| 3. | "Pass That Peace Pipe" | Roger Edens; Hugh Martin; Ralph Blane | 2:20 |
| 4. | "The Music That Makes Me Dance" | Styne; Merrill | 2:44 |
| 5. | "Medley: When the Saints Go Marching In / Brotherhood of Man (uncredited) / He's Got the Whole World in His Hands" | Traditional; Frank Loesser; Traditional | 3:14 |
| Total length: | | | 16:34 |

Side four
| No. | Title | Writer(s) | Length |
|---|---|---|---|
| 1. | "Never Will I Marry" | Loesser | 2:59 |
| 2. | "Encores: Swanee / Chicago / Over The Rainbow / San Francisco" | G. Gershwin; Caesar; Fred Fisher; Arlen; Harburg; Kaper; Walter Jurmann; Kahn | 15:13 |
| Total length: | | | 18:08 |

== Personnel ==
- Harry Robinson Orchestra – orchestra
- Harry Robinson – conductor
- Norrie Paramor – recording supervisor
- Terry O'Neill – photography

== Charts ==
Weekly chart for "Live" at the London Palladium
| Chart (1965) | Peakr position |
|---|---|
| US Billboard 200 | 41 |
| United States (Cashbox Top 100 Albums) | 65 |
| United States (Record World 100 Top Pops) | 45 |
