= Lucky Lady (soundtrack) =

Soundtrack album by Various artists
- Released: January 1976
- Genre: Show tunes, blues, jazz
- Label: Arista

Liza Minnelli chronology
Live at the Winter Garden (1974)	Lucky Lady (1976)	Tropical Nights (1977)

Lucky Lady is the original soundtrack of the 1975 film with the same name, directed by Stanley Donen and set during the Prohibition era. The album features performances by Liza Minnelli in a smoky nightclub style, songs by Fred Ebb and John Kander original recordings by Bessie Smith, and a spoken rendition of "Ain't Misbehavin'" by Burt Reynolds.

Arranged and conducted by Ralph Burns, the soundtrack emphasizes the nostalgic 1930s atmosphere of the film and includes adaptations of traditional American tunes. It was released in January 1976 and received varied critical attention, with some reviewers praising its arrangements and charm while others highlighted its stylized, campy tone.

== Overview ==
The film Lucky Lady, directed by Stanley Donen, is set during the Prohibition era and follows a widow, played by Liza Minnelli, who decides to enter the lucrative business of liquor smuggling alongside her lover (Burt Reynolds) and a new partner (Gene Hackman). Set on the California coast, the trio faces mobsters attempting to take control of the illegal alcohol trade, leading to nighttime chases and sea battles.

The soundtrack is centered on the nostalgic atmosphere of the 1930s, reflecting the film's setting. It features Liza Minnelli performing in a smoky nightclub style, songs by Fred Ebb and John Kander, original Bessie Smith recordings, and a spoken rendition of "Ain't Misbehavin'" by Burt Reynolds accompanied by banjo. The arrangements and conducting are credited to Ralph Burns, who also contributed to several pieces such as "Christy McTeague", "The Guymas Connection", and "Dizzy Fingers", as well as adaptations of traditional American tunes.

The album was released in January 1976, as announced in the January 17, 1976 issue of Cash Box magazine.

== Critical reception ==
High Fidelity described the soundtrack as an enjoyable but somewhat frivolous listen, noting that while Ralph Burns's arrangements were witty and energetically performed, the overall presentation leaned toward excessive camp. The reviewer remarked that the album delivered "good clean fun" and a bright sound, yet suggested that those familiar with the original recordings might find its self-conscious humor and stylized tone more irritating than entertaining.

TimesDaily wrote that listeners would enjoy hearing familiar standards such as "If I Had a Talking Picture of You", "All I Do Is Dream of You", and an extended version of "When the Saints Go Marching In". The Walrus, in its "Fringe Albums" section, described the soundtrack as containing "only the two tracks by Bessie Smith" that were "of serious interest", while noting that the rest of the album, although achieving its intended goals, was "of no progressive concern".

Jonathan Rosenbaum, in his review of the film, included the songs as part of its overall excesses and superficialities. He notes that Liza Minnelli was given "two unmemorable songs" and wryly remarks Burt Reynolds's musical performance, in which he sings "Ain't Misbehavin'" accompanied by a 78 r.p.m. record. In contrast, Peter Bradshaw of The Guardian wrote that Minnelli has a big song in the movie – "Get While the Getting Is Good" – which, according to him, "gives rein to the brassy cynicism and survivor psyche that she can convey with such gusto".

Flavio Marinho of Brazilian magazine Manchete viewed the Lucky Lady soundtrack positively, noting its nostalgic 1930s charm and the overall care in its musical production. He praised its refined arrangements and expressive atmosphere, suggesting that the album conveyed more sophistication and consistency than the film itself.

== Track listing ==
Side A
No.	Title	Writer(s)	Performer	Length
1.	"Too Much Mustard"	Cecil Macklin		2:31
2.	"While the Getting Is Good"	John Kander, Fred Ebb	Liza Minnelli	3:16
3.	"Christy McTeague"	Ralph Burns		2:29
4.	"Young Woman Blues"	Bessie Smith	Bessie Smith	2:41
5.	"The Guymas Connection & Dizzy Fingers"	Ralph Burns, Zez Confrey		4:30
6.	"Lucky Lady Montage"	John Kander, Fred Ebb	Liza Minnelli	2:58

Side B
No.	Title	Writer(s)	Performer	Length
7.	"Medley: If I Had a Talking Picture of You / All I Do Is Dream of You"	B. G. De Sylva, Lew Brown, Ray Henderson / Arthur Freed, Nacio Herb Brown	Vangie Carmichael	2:10
8.	"Ain't Misbehavin'"	Andy Razaf, Fats Waller	Burt Reynolds	1:13
9.	"Hot Time in the Ole Town Tonight"	Joe Hayden, Theo A. Metz	Bessie Smith	3:19
10.	"Portabello Waltzs"	Ralph Burns		2:27
11.	"Saints Go Marching In"	Ralph Burns		5:33
12.	"Lucky Lady"	John Kander, Fred Ebb	Liza Minnelli	2:01

== Personnel ==
Credits adapted from the 1976 LP Lucky Lady.

- Music by Ralph Burns
- Produced, arranged and conducted by Ralph Burns
- Lacquer cut by [Runouts] JG (John Golden)
