= New York, New York (soundtrack) =

Soundtrack album by Various artists
- Released: 1977
- Genre: Show tunes, traditional pop
- Label: United Artists

Liza Minnelli chronology
Tropical Nights (1977)	New York, New York (1977)	The Act (1978)

Singles from New York, New York
- 1. "Theme from New York, New York" Released: June 21, 1977

New York, New York is the original soundtrack album to Martin Scorsese's 1977 musical drama of the same name, starring Liza Minnelli and Robert De Niro. Released by United Artists Records as a two-LP set, the album mirrors the film's narrative progression through the changing landscape of American popular music in the post-World War II era. It features musical supervision and arrangements by Ralph Burns, with original compositions by John Kander and Fred Ebb, including the "Theme from New York, New York".

Vocals are performed predominantly by Minnelli, while the saxophone solos, mimed onscreen by De Niro, were played by jazz musician Georgie Auld. The album's musical palette ranges from big band swing to bebop and 1950s-style pop.

Critically, the soundtrack was praised for its musical authenticity and Minnelli's dynamic vocal performances. Cash Box commended its ability to stand on its own as a "fantastic trip back to be-bop jazz in the '40s", while AllMusic described it as an ambitious reflection of post-war popular music that culminates in a timeless classic with its title track. Commercially, the album debuted on the Billboard Top LPs & Tape chart dated July 1, 1977, peaking at number 50 and remaining on the chart for 14 weeks.

== Album details ==
The soundtrack album for New York, New York (1977) was originally released as a two-LP set. It sonically mirrors the film's narrative by tracing the evolution of popular music in the post-World War II era, transitioning from the big-band swing style, exemplified by a rendition of "Opus Number One" to the emerging sounds of bebop and traditional 1950s pop. The album is dominated vocally by Liza Minnelli's performances, while the saxophone parts, mimed onscreen by Robert De Niro, were performed by Georgie Auld.

The album's musical direction was overseen by supervisor Ralph Burns, who was responsible for recreating the various period-specific styles. It features several original songs penned by the Broadway duo John Kander and Fred Ebb, including "The World Goes 'Round" and an 11-minute pastiche of a Hollywood production number titled "Happy Endings", which featured Larry Kert and was cut from the film's initial theatrical release. The project culminates with the introduction of the title track, "Theme from New York, New York", which later became a standard.

== Release and promotion ==
According to industry reports in May 1977, the soundtrack was a flagship release for United Artists Records that month. Record World noted on May 14th that the label was set to release ten new albums, prominently including the "soon to be released" motion picture soundtrack featuring Liza Minnelli performing the title track. This was echoed by Cash Box in its May 28th edition, which stated the album would "highlight the list of new LPs" from the label. The July 2, 1977 issue of Music Week listed the album among that month's UK releases in the Pop Listing section.

To promote the concurrent release of the film and its soundtrack in May 1977, United Artists Records launched an extensive merchandising campaign. This initiative included providing retailers with the official film poster and other specially designed display materials. A consumer offer was also implemented, allowing buyers of the two-record soundtrack to purchase an official movie promotional T-shirt, featuring likenesses of stars Liza Minnelli and Robert De Niro, by using a coupon inserted in the album. Furthermore, the company secured prominent advertising space, including a billboard on the Sunset Strip. An ad promoting the soundtrack was published in the August 6, 1977 issue of Music Week.

== Theme song ==
Fred Ebb and John Kander's initial submission for the theme song was deemed so bad that Robert De Niro rejected it outright. The lyrics began, "They always say it's a nice place to visit, but I wouldn't want to live here", and the melody was completely different. The eventual song, "Theme from New York, New York", begins with one of Kander's famous vamps, derived from the ragtime practice of putting the melody underneath a repeated note.

The song was released as a single from the soundtrack album, and peaked at #104 on the Billboard chart. Two years later, Frank Sinatra recorded a cover version for his triple album Trilogy: Past Present Future. On June 14, 1980, the single reached No. 32 on the Billboard Hot 100 and was Sinatra's last top 40 hit. Both Sinatra's and Minnelli's versions have become closely associated with Manhattan in New York City. Sinatra performed the number at nearly all of his concerts until his retirement in 1995, and Minnelli continues to perform it at nearly all of hers.

== Critical reception ==
Professional ratings
Review scores
Source	Rating
AllMusic	4/5 stars

In its contemporary review, Cash Box magazine praised the soundtrack's ability to stand on its own, noting that while some film scores lose their impact without the visual component, this double album served as a "fantastic trip back to be-bop jazz in the '40s". The review highlighted Liza Minnelli's "boundless talents" as a major component of the musical repertoire but also commended the contributions of the "veteran pros" involved, singling out the "especially tasty" saxophone work of Georgie Auld. The publication deemed the album a "perfect period slice for jazz and varied playlists".

William Ruhlmann of AllMusic described the soundtrack as an ambitious mirror of the film, which captured the evolution of post-war popular music from the height of swing to the era of bebop and traditional pop. He highlighted the vocal dominance of Liza Minnelli and the saxophone work of Georgie Auld, who mimed for Robert De Niro onscreen, noting how the protagonists' musical separation reflected the demise of their romance. Ruhlmann praised musical supervisor Ralph Burns's work in recreating the period's styles and the songs by Kander and Ebb, culminating in the "classic" title track, "New York, New York," which became a timeless standard.

In June 2026, CBS News included the song in its list of the 250 essential American songs of the past 250 years.

== Commercial performance ==
The album debuted on the Billboard Top LPs & Tape chart dated July 1, 1977, peaking at number 50 and remaining on the chart for 14 weeks. It debuted on the Record World Album Chart at position 139 on July 9, 1977. It experienced a significant jump to number 118 the following week and eventually peaked at number 72 on September 10 of that year. The album remained on the chart for eleven weeks.

== Track listing ==
The LP soundtrack for New York, New York is a double album. It was produced, conducted and arranged by Ralph Burns.

Side 1
No.	Title	Writer(s)	Performers	Length
1.	"Main Title"	Fred Ebb and John Kander		1:53
2.	"You Brought a New Kind of Love to Me"	Sammy Fain, Irving Kahal, and Pierre Norman	Liza Minnelli	1:47
3.	"Flip the Dip"	Georgie Auld	Georgie Auld	2:13
4.	"V.J. Stomp"	Ralph Burns		1:08
5.	"Opus Number One"	Sy Oliver		8:49
6.	"Once in a While"	Michael Edwards and Bud Green	Liza Minnelli	2:17
Total length:				18:07

Side 2
No.	Title	Writer(s)	Performers	Length
1.	"You Are My Lucky Star"	Nacio Herb Brown and Arthur Freed	Liza Minnelli	1:15
2.	"Game Over"	Georgie Auld		2:22
3.	"It's a Wonderful World"	Jan Savitt, Johnny Watson, Harold Adamson		2:06
4.	"The Man I Love"	George and Ira Gershwin	Liza Minnelli	3:17
5.	"Hazoy"	Ralph Burns		2:36
6.	"Just You, Just Me"	Jesse Greer and Raymond Klages	Liza Minnelli	2:25
Total length:				14:01

Side 3
No.	Title	Writer(s)	Performers	Length
1.	"There Goes the Ball Game"	Kander and Ebb	Liza Minnelli	1:30
2.	"Blue Moon"	Richard Rodgers and Lorenz Hart	Robert De Niro & Mary Kay Place	3:26
3.	"Don't Be That Way"	Benny Goodman, Edgar Sampson, and Mitchell Parish		0:42
4.	"Happy Endings"	Kander and Ebb	Liza Minnelli & Larry Kert	11:35
Total length:				17:13

Side 4
No.	Title	Writer(s)	Performers	Length
1.	"But the World Goes 'Round"	Kander and Ebb	Liza Minnelli	3:55
2.	"Theme from New York, New York"	Kander and Ebb	Georgie Auld	3:42
3.	"Honeysuckle Rose"	Fats Waller and Andy Razaf	Diahnne Abbott	2:14
4.	"Theme from New York, New York"	Kander and Ebb	Liza Minnelli	3:15
5.	"Theme from New York, New York (Orchestral Reprise)"	Kander and Ebb		1:13
Total length:				14:19

"Happy Endings" was recorded for the film but edited out of the theatrical release.

== Personnel ==
Credits adapted from New York, New York soundtrack LP.

- Abe Most – clarinet
- Bob Tricarico, Jerome Richardson – saxophone
- Chauncy Welsh, Jim Cleveland – trombone
- Conte Condoli, Snooky Young, Warren Luening – trumpet
- Russ Freeman – piano
- Jim Hughart – bass
- Bill LaVorgna, Sol Gubin – drums
- John Neal – engineer

== Charts ==
Weekly chart for New York, New York soundtrack
Chart (1977)	Peak position
Australia (Kent Music Report)	92
US Billboard Top LPs & Tape	50
US The Album Chart (Record World)	72
