= Liza! Liza! =

Studio album by Liza Minnelli
- Released: October 12, 1964
- Recorded: June 1964
- Studio: Capitol, New York City
- Genre: Pop, vocal, traditional
- Label: Capitol
- Producer: Simon Rady

Liza Minnelli chronology
Best Foot Forward (1963)	Liza! Liza! (1964)	It Amazes Me (1965)

Liza! Liza! (later reissued as Liza Minnelli Sings the Sensational Hit from the Film 'Cabaret' Maybe This Time) is the debut studio album by American singer and actress Liza Minnelli, released by Capitol Records on October 12, 1964. The album features Minnelli's interpretations of twelve popular standards. Its release capitalized on the significant publicity surrounding Minnelli following her critical acclaim in the theater, particularly her recent Tony Award-winning performance in the Broadway musical Flora the Red Menace.

The album's production was helmed by arranger and conductor Peter Matz. Recording sessions took place over three months in mid-1964 at Capitol's studio in New York City. A significant aspect of the project was Minnelli's early collaboration with the songwriting duo John Kander and Fred Ebb, which would become one of the most defining partnerships of her career.

Liza! Liza! was met with immediate enthusiasm from music trade publications upon its release, with critics praising the surprising maturity, vocal power, and distinctive style of the young performer. The album is notable for containing an early recording of "Maybe This Time" a Kander and Ebb composition that would later become Minnelli's signature song. The debut sold half million copies in the US.

== Background ==
Liza Minnelli recorded the songs for the album while still a teenager. At seventeen, she had already starred in the Off-Broadway revival of Best Foot Forward, for which she recorded several songs from the soundtrack. The following year, she earned her first Tony Award for Best Leading Actress in a Musical for her performance in the Broadway musical Flora the Red Menace. The publicity generated by her vocal and acting abilities led to television appearances and the recording of a single on the Cadence Records label, "You Are For Loving", which sold 500,000 copies. On the strength of this, Capitol signed the singer and slowly began issuing several singles targeted to Minnelli's age group and later committed to a whole album. These singles were recorded over the summer of 1963 in New York.

== Recording and production ==
The record label's strategy was to position her as a younger counterpart to her mother and label-mate, Judy Garland, as well as a potential competitor to Columbia Records' emerging star, Barbra Streisand. To this end, Capitol enlisted arranger and conductor Peter Matz, who had previously worked with Streisand, to craft a similar repertoire. This involved selecting obscure songs from the Great American Songbook and furnishing them with inventive new arrangements.

For the creation of her debut album, she turned to her friend and classmate Marvin Hamlisch, who could help her in choosing the tunes. At the time he was working in the Broadway production of Funny Girl. Two of the songs featured on the album, "It's Just a Matter of Time" and "The Travelin' Life", were cut by Minnelli with Hamlisch on piano 2 years earlier as a gift to her mother. "If I Were in Your Shoes", was written by the young writers Fred Ebb and John Kander, who had yet to make a big impact on the stage. One of their compositions for the album, "Maybe This Time", later became Minnelli's signature song after being incorporated into the soundtrack for the 1972 film adaptation of Cabaret.

The final tracklist comprises twelve interpretations of popular music, including "Together (Wherever We Go)", "Blue Moon", and "I'm All I've Got". The recording sessions took place over approximately three months, beginning in June 1964 at Capitol Records' New York studio at 151 West 46th Street.

== Release details ==
The album's release was noted by major trade publications in October 1984. It first appeared in the "New Album Releases" section of Billboard magazine on October 3, followed by an inclusion in Cash Box's "New Album Releases - Pop" section on October 17.

Capitalizing on the success of Cabaret, Capitol Records re-issued the album (catalogue no. ST 11080) with new artwork and the new title Maybe This Time. The release's full official title was Liza Minnelli Sings the Sensational Hit from the Film 'Cabaret' Maybe This Time. The British magazine Record Mirror described the release as an "interesting nostalgia view of a then young talent". Two songs missing from the original album: "I'm All I've Got" and "Blue Moon".

DRG's 2006 compilation The Complete Capitol Collection includes all of the songs from Liza! Liza! in their original order, as well as using the cover art.

== Critical reception ==
Professional ratings
Review scores
Source	Rating
AllMusic	3.5/5 stars
Record Mirror	3/5 stars

Upon its release, Billboard magazine featured the album in its "Pop Spotlight" section, praising it enthusiastically. The review described the album as "a gas" and called Minnelli "simply great," noting her performance was "a combination of mom [Ethel Merman] and Streisand." It stated that "the gal packs more into a song than a listener has reason to expect these days," highlighting her "clarity of tone, genuine feeling, emotion, bizazz and the unexpected." The review concluded with a strong recommendation: "Buy it! It will be the first in a truly great collection of Liza Minnelli albums". Cash Box hailed Minnelli's debut as an "auspicious" achievement, noting that she performs a selection of "chestnuts and recent ballad gems" with a professionalism that "belies her years". The review predicted that industry insiders would take notice of her "feelingful and highly stylized readings" of songs like "Maybe This Time" and "Don't Ever Leave Me", concluding that the "fine new talent" on display should lead the album to "soar in sales."

Record World reviewed the album as a declaration of artistic independence, stating that "Liza is her own boss now". The magazine considered Liza! Liza! as an "impressive and beguiling" collection that unveiled "a beautifully varied and rainbow-shaded disk of individual vocal stylings," ultimately announcing Minnelli as a "major singing talent," a fact highlighted by the contrasting extremes of songs like "Try to Remember" and "I'm All I've Got". Music Business magazine highlighted the album's vocal delivery, noting that "Miss Minnelli gives out the warm, tender, expressive readings of some great ballads".

Record Mirror was effusive in its praise, with reviewer P.J. introducing Minnelli as "just about the zippiest new talent on the girlie disc scene". The review emphasized that while she shared the "emotionalism and dynamicism" of her mother, her work was not "copy-cat". It highlighted her "confident, brash, youthful singing at its best" on upbeat numbers and her ability to be "sweet and calm" on ballads. The critique concluded with a definitive prediction: "Liza Minnelli is going to be a very, very, big star indeed. That's for sure".

The critic from High Fidelity wrote in January 1965 that "it takes only a few minutes of listening here to know that Liza Minnelli is Judy Garland's daughter". The similarities, according to the review, "do not stem so much from conscious copying as from the natural closeness of familial relationship". They described the album as "an unusually well-selected one", and praise was given to Miss Minnelli's "wide range in both voice and style," as well as the "excellent arrangements (uncredited) and a fine orchestra" conducted by Peter Matz.

In a retrospective review for AllMusic, William Ruhlmann highlighted Matz's "inventive" arrangements and Minnelli's performance, observing that while the ballads revealed a vocal resemblance to her mother, combining "emotional sensitivity and nearly unbridled power", the album also showcased her comic abilities on novelty numbers. The review singled out her early, fervent renditions of John Kander and Fred Ebb's "Maybe This Time" and "If I Were in Your Shoes" as particularly significant.

== Commercial performance ==
In the October 31, 1964 issue of Cash Box, Liza! Liza! appeared at number ten on the "Looking Ahead Albums". After that, the album charted on the US Billboard Top LP's (present Billboard 200), making its debut at number 130 on the chart dated November 21, 1964. The album reached its peak position of number 115 on December 12 of the same year. It remained on the chart for a total of eight weeks. In the Music Business magazine, on the "Pop LP's – Action Albums" chart, Liza! Liza! made its debut at number 99 on December 5, 1964. One week later, it soared to number 98, which would also mark its final appearance on the chart.

Over a period of 3 years Liza! Liza! reportedly sold over half a million copies in the United States.

== Track listing ==
Liza! Liza!
No.	Title	Writer(s)	Length
1.	"It's Just a Matter of Time"	Richard Everitt, Laurence Stith	3:00
2.	"If I Were in Your Shoes"	John Kander, Fred Ebb	3:13
3.	"Meantime"	Al Stillman, Robert Allen	3:30
4.	"Try to Remember"	Harvey Schmidt, Tom Jones	4:15
5.	"I'm All I've Got"	Milton Schafer, Ronny Graham	1:55
6.	"Maybe Soon"	Richard Everitt, Laurence Stith	3:09
7.	"Maybe This Time"	John Kander, Fred Ebb	3:20
8.	"Don't Ever Leave Me"	Jerome Kern, Oscar Hammerstein II	2:40
9.	"The Travelin' Life"	Howard Liebling, Marvin Hamlisch	2:50
10.	"Together (Wherever We Go)"	Stephen Sondheim, Jule Styne	3:35
11.	"Blue Moon"	Richard Rodgers, Lorenz Hart	2:00
12.	"I Knew Him When"	Harold Arlen, E.Y. "Yip" Harburg, Ira Gershwin	2:25

Liza! Liza! – Digital album bonus tracks
No.	Title	Writer(s)	Length
13.	"One Summer Love" (Capitol single A-side #4994)	Lary Stith, Richard Everitt	2:15
14.	"How Much Will I Love You" (Capitol single B-side #4994)	Raymond B. Evans, Jarry Livingston	2:33
15.	"Day Dreaming" (Capitol single A-side #5103)	Mort Garson, Bob Hilliard	2:34
16.	"His Woman" (Capitol single B-side #5103)	Mort Garson, Bob Hilliard	2:35
17.	"My Little Corner of the World" (Capitol single B-side #5103)	Bob Hilliard, Lee Pockriss	2:13
18.	"We'll Be Together"	Mort Garson, Bob Hilliard	2:32

== Personnel ==
Credits adapted from the liner notes of Liza! Liza! LP (Capitol Records, catalog no. T-2174).

- Conductor – Peter Matz
- Photography By [Back Cover] – John Engstead
- Photography By [Front Cover] – Sherman Weisburd
- Producer – Si Rady

== Charts ==
Weekly charts for Liza! Liza.
Chart (1964)	Peak position
US Billboard 200	115
US Pop LP's – Action Albums (Music Business)	98
