= Flora the Red Menace (cast recording) =

Soundtrack album by Various artists
- Released: May 1965
- Genre: Show tunes
- Label: RCA Victor

Liza Minnelli chronology
It Amazes Me (1965)	Flora the Red Menace (1965)	Live at the London Palladium (1965)

Singles from Flora the Red Menace
- 1. "A Quiet Thing" / "All I Need" Released: 1965

Flora the Red Menace is the cast recording of the 1965 musical of the same name released by RCA Victor in May 1965. The musical, which opened on Broadway on May 11, 1965, tells the story of Flora Meszaros, an aspiring fashion designer, and her romance with Harry Toukarian, a Communist party member, set against the backdrop of the Great Depression. The show marked the Broadway debut of 19-year-old Liza Minnelli and the first stage collaboration of composer John Kander and lyricist Fred Ebb.

RCA Victor recorded the album two days before the Broadway opening, aiming to release it immediately after critics' reviews and capitalize on them. Prior to the album's release, Capitol issued the single "A Quiet Thing", which received praise from Billboard.

Music critics praised the score by Kander and Ebb, and highlighted the performances of the cast. Commercially, the recording charted on both the Billboard 200 and the Cash Box Top 100 Albums charts.

== Background and release ==
Flora the Red Menace is a Broadway musical that opened on May 11, 1965, and closed after 87 performances on July 24. Based on Lester Atwell's novel Love Is Just Around the Corner, the show is set in New York during the Great Depression and follows the romance between Flora Meszaros, an aspiring fashion designer, and Harry Toukarian, a Communist party member. The musical marked the Broadway debut of 19-year-old Liza Minnelli and the first stage collaboration of composer John Kander and lyricist Fred Ebb. The cast includes Bob Dishy, Marie Louise Wilson, James Cresson, and Cathryn Damon.

Before the release of the album, Capitol issued the single "A Quiet Thing" by Liza Minnelli. Billboard praised the song as "a show-stopping ballad" performed by Minnelli, adding that composers Fred Ebb and John Kander had outdone their previous hit "Coloring Book".

RCA Victor broke with the traditional practice of waiting until after a Broadway show's opening to record the original cast album by conducting the recording sessions two days before its Broadway premiere. This strategy, planned by Victor vice-president George R. Marek, aimed to capitalize on the New York critics' reviews as quickly as possible. As a result, the album was released in stores the day after the reviews appeared. The album was released on May 1965.

In 1978, RCA Records re-released Flora, the Red Menace (CBL1-2760), along with other Broadway cast albums, including Two's Company, starring Bette Davis, and Allegro by Richard Rodgers and Oscar Hammerstein II. According to Billboard, these shows' original releases had maintained steady sales over the years and, in some cases, became collector's items.

== Critical reception ==
Professional ratings
Review scores
Source	Rating
AllMusic	2.5/5 stars
Cast Album Reviews	3/5 stars

Billboard described the album as "a musical treat" and considered songs like "Sing Happy", "A Geiet Thing", "Dear Near", "The Flame" and "Express Yourself" as "memorable show items". The New York Times praised the recording as "the most entertaining show recording of this season", highlighting that "the consistent sparkle of the performances, combined with the opportunities spread throughout the cast, give the recording variety and sustain the flow of interest".

William Ruhlmann of AllMusic noted that the album is "more memorable for the people who worked on it than for the show itself", adding that Minnelli "shines particularly on 'A Quiet Thing'". Peter Filichia of Cast Album Reviews wrote that ""A Quiet Thing" and "Sing Happy" [are] stunners, especially as delivered by Minnelli when she was young and full of potential".

== Commercial performance ==
The album debuted on the Billboard 200 chart on July 3, 1965, eventually peaking at number 111. It remained on the chart for a total of eight weeks. The album entered the Cash Box Top 100 Albums chart on June 12, 1965, reaching its highest position at number 69 in its sixth week. Its last appearance on the chart was on August 7, 1965, at number 95, spending a total of nine weeks on the list.

== Track listing ==
Flora the Red Menace – Side A
No.	Title	Writer(s)	Performers	Length
1.	"Overture"	John Kander, Fred Ebb		3:32
2.	"Prologue / Unafraid"	John Kander, Fred Ebb	Liza Minnelli	3:51
3.	"All I Need (Is One Good Break)"	John Kander, Fred Ebb	Liza Minnelli	3:20
4.	"Not Every Day Of The Week"	John Kander, Fred Ebb	Liza Minnelli, Bob Dishy	3:44
5.	"Sign Here"	John Kander, Fred Ebb	Liza Minnelli, Bob Dishy	3:48
6.	"The Flame"	John Kander, Fred Ebb	Mary Louise Wilson, Cathryn Damon, Louis Guss, Clark Morgan, Bob Dishy	3:45
7.	"Palomino Pal"	John Kander, Fred Ebb	James Cresson, Dortha Duckworth	1:50

Flora the Red Menace – Side B
No.	Title	Writer(s)	Performers	Length
8.	"A Quiet Thing"	John Kander, Fred Ebb	Liza Minnelli	3:58
9.	"Hello, Waves"	John Kander, Fred Ebb	Liza Minnelli	2:37
10.	"Dear Love"	John Kander, Fred Ebb	Liza Minnelli	3:57
11.	"Express Yourself"	John Kander, Fred Ebb	Cathryn Damon, Bob Dishy, James Cresson	2:48
12.	"Knock Knock"	John Kander, Fred Ebb	James Cresson	3:06
13.	"Sing Happy"	John Kander, Fred Ebb	Liza Minnelli	3:28
14.	"You Are You"	John Kander, Fred Ebb	Liza Minnelli, Robert Kaye, Danny Carroll, Marie Santell, Jamie Donnelly, Stephanie Hill, Joe E. Marks	3:20

== Personnel ==
Credits adapted from Flora the Red Menace LP (RCA Red Seal, CBL1-2760).

- Arranged by (dance arrangements) David Baker
- Art direction by Dick Smith
- Lyrics by Fred Ebb
- Music by John Kander
- Music director and conductor Harold Hastings
- Orchestrated by Don Walker
- Produced by George R. Marek
- Reissue produced by Peter Dellheim
- Remastered by Edwin Begley
- Sleeve notes by Mort Goode
- Book by Robert Russell
- Book and direction by George Abbott

== Charts ==
Weekly chart for Flora the Red Menace
Chart (1965)	Peak position
US Billboard 200	111
US Top 100 Albums (Cash Box)	69
