= The Singer (Liza Minnelli album) =

Studio album by Liza Minnelli
- Released: March 1, 1973
- Studios: Larrabee Sound Studios, Hollywood, California
- Genres: Pop; vocal; traditional
- Length: 36:14
- Label: Columbia
- Producer: Snuff Garrett

Liza Minnelli chronology
Liza with a Z (1972)	The Singer (1973)	The Liza Minnelli Foursider (1973)

Singles from The Singer
- 1. "The Singer" Released: November 27, 1972; 2. "Don't Let Me Be Lonely Tonight" Released: April 1973; 3. "Dancing in the Moonlight" Released: May 11, 1973; 4. "I Believe in Music" Released: August 24, 1973

The Singer is the seventh studio album by American singer and actress Liza Minnelli, released in 1973. It marked her first release under Columbia Records and was highly anticipated by the public. Liza Minnelli signed with Columbia in March 1972 and began recording The Singer that September. The album was created during a peak in her career, following her Academy Award for Best Actress for Cabaret and the critical and commercial success of her Emmy-winning television special Liza with a Z. The project features songs by prominent singer-songwriters of the early 1970s, including James Taylor, Stevie Wonder and Carly Simon.

The Singer became one of Minnelli's most successful studio albums, reaching number 38 on the Billboard 200 and spending 20 weeks on the chart. It was promoted through magazine advertisements and radio commercials. The album received favorable reviews from critics, who noted Minnelli's interpretive skill in performing contemporary popular songs of the era.

== Background ==
In the late 1960s and early 1970s, Clive Davis, aiming to balance Columbia Records' catalog between the rising rock genre and artists with broader appeal (middle-of-the-road), identified Liza Minnelli as a strategic opportunity. Although already an established star in film and on stage, Liza had not achieved major success in the recording industry. Her manager, Stevie Phillips, proposed an unusual deal: instead of a large financial advance, the artist prioritized chart success, with the freedom to terminate the contract if that goal was not met. Clive Davis accepted the challenge, confident in Liza's talent and Columbia's promotional power.

On March 1, 1972, when Minnelli signed her contract with Columbia Records, she was at the peak of her career due to her role in the successful film Cabaret which earned her an Academy Award for Best Actress. During the same period, her television special Liza with a Z not only garnered high ratings but also won four Emmy Awards. The soundtrack was certified gold (similar to the aforementioned film soundtrack) by the Recording Industry Association of America. According to Davis, the massive success of those projects, which elevated Liza to international stardom, did not alter the original terms of the agreement, cementing a partnership based on trust.

== Production and recording ==
In September 1972, recording sessions began for what would become The Singer. Originally, fellow label artist Barbra Streisand was set to release an album with the same title, featuring the track by Walter Marks, but the project was shelved, allowing Minnelli to breathe life into an album that would become a significant part of her own musical journey. Clive Davis, then guided a musical repositioning, moving Minnelli slightly away from a purely theatrical repertoire toward a more contemporary sound that would still appeal to her traditional audience. The title track bears resemblance to songs from Cabaret, and there is a sense of Liza's acting prowess in her renditions of tracks like "I'd Love You to Want Me" and "Don't Let Me Be Lonely Tonight".

The early 1970s were a period when singer-songwriters were on the rise, and the album's tracklist features songs by artists such as James Taylor, Stevie Wonder, Bill Withers, Mac Davis, and Carly Simon. The selected songs are mostly summer hits from 1971 and 1972. In an interview with Record World, by journalists Robert Adels and Lenny Beer, the singer stated that, although she enjoyed working with producer Snuff Garrett and credited Marvin Hamlisch with "saving the whole thing", the album was not what she truly liked doing. Minnelli revealed that the project, which involved recording covers of other people's hits—a method she considered a "supposedly sure-fire system"—was done by following advice that, in hindsight, she found to be "strange" and because she had been "naive" in accepting it. She also made it clear that her artistic preference had always been to "go out on a limb" and seek out new and unpublished material, something no one else had done, like songs about divorce or interesting themes adapted from French, rather than resorting to other artists' hits. The experience taught her that she needed to "get on her own broom" and take control of her career, focusing on what truly motivated her: innovation and connection with the audience.

== Release and promotion ==
The album was promoted through full-page advertisements in various magazines (such as Billboard) and radio commercials. Columbia Records (under its UK arm, CBS) executed a comprehensive promotional campaign in the UK. The label coordinated the release with her three major concert dates in London – at the London Palladium, Royal Festival Hall, and Rainbow Theatret. To bolster in-store presence, CBS supplied 500 life-sized cutouts of Minnelli to dealers across the UK, along with extensive poster and display materials. Additionally, the company secured large-scale outdoor advertising, including prominent Minnelli posters displayed across 1,000 mainline railway station billboards.

The first single, the title-track, reached number 42 on the adult contemporary chart in Canada, as published by RPM.

== Critical reception ==
Professional ratings
Review scores
Source	Rating
AllMusic	3/5 stars

Billboard selected "Oh, Babe, What Would You Say?", "I'd Love You to Want Me", "Where Is the Love?", and "Dancing in the Moonlight" as the standout tracks and considered the vocals clear and convincing while capturing the vibrant essence of the singer. The Record World praised the album, calling it a "striking success". They highlighted the song selection as a "terrific compilation of top material", citing specific tracks like "Dancing In The Moonlight" and "I'd Love You To Want Me". Regarding the song "Baby Don't Get Hooked On Me", it was described as particularly effective and dramatic.

Jack Garner of The Evening News praised the album, considering it a strong candidate for a Grammy. He described the title track as an authentic homage to the European music halls of the 1930s, sounding both campy and strangely contemporary. Garner celebrated Minnelli's versatility, highlighting how she found a soul groove in "Use Me", a warm sensuality in "I'd Love You To Want Me", a corny fun in "Oh, Babe, What Would You Say", and a vibrant feeling in an accelerated version of "Where Is the Love". The production by the duo Al Cappa and Marvin Hamlisch was also praised by him.

The Hour newspapper critic argued that the album deserved an award, framing it as a musical extension of Minnelli's Oscar-winning artistic excellence and a continuation of the Garland family's legacy. Contrary to the critic, Robert Hilburn of The Leader-Post (originally from the Los Angeles Times) included The Singer in his 1973 annual list of "wasted vinyl" awards. In his critique, he expressed great disappointment, arguing that the album fell well below expectations for an artist of her caliber. Hilburn noted that while artists normally wait until the twilight of their careers to simply record covers of the latest hits, Minnelli—who was less established on record than in film and theater—had already begun adopting this approach prematurely, picking up recent hits like "Oh, Babe, What Would You Say" and "You're So Vain" rather than finding her own material.

In its May 1973 issue, Gramophone considered The Singer less impressive than Minnelli's previous albums Cabaret and Liza with a "Z". The review noted that Minnelli effectively incorporated contemporary sounds and ideas into the material, aided by arrangers Al Capps and Marvin Hamlisch and producer Snuff Garrett. The critic highlighted her exceptional interpretations of songs such as Mac Davis's "I Believe In Music" and "Baby, Don't Get Hooked On Me," Carly Simon's "You're So Vain," and Stevie Wonder's "You Are the Sunshine of My Life," praising the album's strong selection of contemporary compositions.

Record Mirror praised the album, highlighting Minneli's "very special" interpretation of Carly Simon's "You're So Vain" as a standout moment. Other tracks noted as "exceptional" included her versions of James Taylor's "Don't Let Me Be Lonely Tonight," Mac Davis's "I Believe In Music," which opens the album, and the "plaintive" "Where Is The Love." The reviewer stated that Minnelli deserved her place in the superstar bracket and considered her one of the most thrilling vocal talents of the time.

William Ruhlmann of AllMusic stated that the tracklist consisted of songs that seemed to have been chosen based on what was popular during the summers of 1972 and 1973, and concluded that the singer gave her best in her interpretations of them.

== Commercial performance ==
The Singer became one of the biggest commercial successes of the Minnelli's career. It reached number 38 on the Billboard 200, and spent 20 weeks on the same chart. According to the April 7, 1973 issue of the magazine, the album experienced a significant surge on the charts the week Minnelli won the Oscar for Best Actress for Cabaret, when it jumped from position 147 to 96.

On the Cash Box best-selling albums chart, it peaked at number 39 and spent a total of 12 weeks on the chart. On Record World's chart, The Singer debuted at number 129 on March 31, 1973, peaked at number 52 on May 26 of the same year, and made its last recorded appearance on July 7, 1973, at number 117.

According to Clive Davis, the album sold 20,000 copies in advance in the United Kingdom, as reported in Billboard magazine on May 26, 1973.

== Track listing ==
No.	Title	Writer(s)	Length
1.	"I Believe in Music"	Mac Davis	3:37
2.	"Use Me"	Bill Withers	3:39
3.	"I'd Love You to Want Me"	Lobo	3:36
4.	"Oh, Babe, What Would You Say?"	Eileen Sylvia Smith	3:31
5.	"You're So Vain"	Carly Simon	3:30
6.	"Where Is the Love?"	Ralph MacDonald, William Salter	3:49
7.	"The Singer"	Walter Marks	2:31
8.	"Don't Let Me Be Lonely Tonight"	James Taylor	3:51
9.	"Dancing in the Moonlight"	Sherman Kelly	3:19
10.	"You Are the Sunshine of My Life"	Stevie Wonder	2:36
11.	"Baby Don't Get Hooked on Me"	Mac Davis	2:52
Total length:			36:14

Expanded edition bonus tracks
No.	Title	Writer(s)	Length
12.	"Mr. Emery Won't Be Home"	Bob Stone	2:48
13.	"All That Jazz" (from Chicago)	John Kander, Fred Ebb	3:05
14.	"My Own Best Friend" (from Chicago)	John Kander, Fred Ebb	3:10
15.	"Me and My Baby" (from Chicago)	John Kander, Fred Ebb	1:53

== Personnel ==
Credits adapted from the liner notes of the LP The Singer (Columbia, catalog no. KC 32149).

- Engineered by Lenny Roberts
- Arranged by Al Capps
- Vocals arranged by Marvin Hamlisch
- Art direction by Ron Coro
- Photography by Alan Pappé
- Recorded and overdubbed at Larrabee Sound, Hollywood, Ca.

== Charts ==
Weekly charts for The Singer
Chart (1973)	Peak position
Canada Top Albums/CDs (RPM)	45
UK Albums (Official Charts)	45
US Billboard 200	38
US Top 100 Albums (Cash Box)	39
US The Album Chart (Record World)	52
