= Maybe This Time (Kander and Ebb song) =

Pop standard first popularized by Liza Minnelli

"Maybe This Time" is a song written by John Kander and Fred Ebb, popularized by Liza Minnelli in the 1972 film Cabaret.

While first recorded by Kaye Ballard, Minnelli included the song on her debut studio album Liza! Liza! (1964), as well as her New Feelin' album (1970).

== Production ==
Though originally written as a single in 1964, the song was interpolated into the 1972 film adaptation of Kander and Ebb's stage musical Cabaret. The song proved so popular that revivals of the show since 1998 have added it to the score.

== Analysis ==
The Telegraph explained that the song should have an air of "desperate hope" and that Bowles should feel like "someone teetering on the edge of despair." Talkin' Broadway said "'Maybe this Time' serving as Sally's internal monologue in response to Cliff's plea", adding that the song "is the only time we see the real person beneath the frivolous girl for whom life is a neverending party (cabaret, whatever). As we're privy to Sally's unspoken thoughts here". What's On in Cape Town described Sally Bowles as a Manic Pixie Dream Girl, writing "Her iconic solo, 'Maybe This Time', can be considered the MPDG theme song." Bowles "believ[es] she may be in love for the first time".

== Critical reception ==
The song has been described as "wistful", and "heartbreaking". Lincolnshire Review described the song as a "soaring ballad", and Peterborough Telegraph deemed it "hopeful".
