= Liza with a Z =

1972 television concert film starring Liza Minnelli

- Poster for remastered version
- Genre: Concert film
- Written by: Fred Ebb
- Directed by: Bob Fosse
- Starring: Liza Minnelli
- Theme music composer: Kander and Ebb
- Country of origin: United States
- Original language: English

Production
- Producers: Fred Ebb; Bob Fosse; Michael Arick (re-master); Craig Zadan (re-master); Neil Meron (re-master)
- Cinematography: Owen Roizman
- Editor: Alan Heim
- Running time: 51 min.

Original release
- Network: NBC
- Release: September 10, 1972

Liza with a "Z" is a 1972 concert film made for television, starring Liza Minnelli, produced by Fred Ebb and Bob Fosse. Fosse also directed and choreographed the concert, and Ebb wrote and arranged the music with his song-writing partner John Kander. All four had recently completed the successful film adaptation of Cabaret. According to Minnelli, Liza with a "Z" was "the first filmed concert on television". Singer sponsored the production, even though producers did their best to prevent the sponsors from seeing rehearsals, fearing they would back out due to Minnelli's short skirts.

Filmed on May 31 at the Lyceum Theatre in New York, after eight weeks of rehearsals, the concert was shot with eight 16 mm film cameras at the insistence of Fosse, in contrast to other television specials of the time which were all shot on videotape.

Throughout the concert Minnelli sings and dances to a variety of popular songs, highlights from Cabaret, and material specifically written for her by Kander and Ebb—most notably the title song. Minnelli is often accompanied on stage by dancers, backup singers, and musicians. Costumes were designed by Halston, who was also a friend of Minnelli's. Marvin Hamlisch was selected by Kander and Ebb to be music coordinator.

First broadcast by NBC on September 10, 1972, it went on to win four Emmys and a Peabody Award. Kay Gardella of the New York Daily News reviewed the film as being "sensational with an S." After the initial broadcast, NBC re-ran the concert only twice more and did not screen it again after 1973. The film was not seen for over thirty years and was thought lost until 1999, when Michael Arick discovered that Minnelli owned the copyright and the two set about restoring the negatives.

== Musical numbers ==
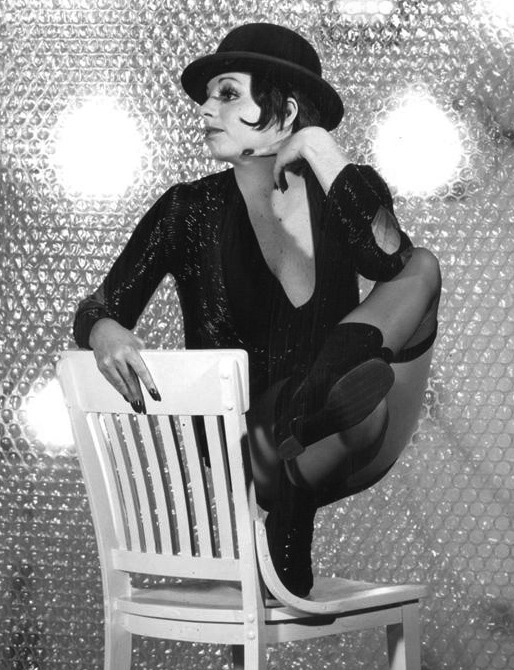
Publicity photo from the production

1. "Yes"
2. "God Bless the Child"
3. "Say Liza (Liza with a "Z")"
4. "It Was a Good Time"
5. "I Gotcha"
6. "Son of a Preacher Man"
7. "Ring Them Bells"
8. "Bye Bye Blackbird"
9. "You've Let Yourself Go"
10. "My Mammy"
11. Cabaret Medley (Note: Consists of "Willkommen", "Married", "Money", "Maybe This Time", and "Cabaret")

== Remaster and DVD release ==
After the initial broadcasts in 1972 and 1973, the negatives were stored in the vaults of NBC, only occasionally being brought out for Minnelli's own personal use. In the 1980s, the original negatives were lost and feared destroyed. Michael Arick and Minnelli eventually tracked down the original negatives in 1999 in Los Angeles and New York. In 2005, Minnelli revealed to Craig Zadan and Neil Meron, producers and friends of hers, that she owned the rights to the film and that she had been restoring it with Arick. They introduced her to Robert Greenblatt, President of Entertainment for Showtime, who agreed to finance the restoration, broadcast the film, and release the DVD.

The remastered film was accepted into both the Toronto International Film Festival and the Hamptons Film Festival and premiered September 9, 2005, at the Elgin and Winter Garden Theatres in Toronto. Showtime broadcast the restored film on April 1, 2006.

As well as a restored picture, the DVD also offers the option of 5.1 surround sound audio. This was made possible due to a new mix being created from reels of sound recordings Minnelli had personally archived after the original production in 1972. The DVD also includes a commentary track recorded by Minnelli, a performance of "Mein Herr" cut from the original film, an interview with Kander recorded by Minnelli, a recording of Minnelli and the restoration producers discussing the film at the Toronto Film Festival, and a separate performance by Minnelli at the GLAAD Awards in 2005.

== Awards and honors ==
| Year | Award | Category | Recipient(s) and nominee(s) | Result |
|---|---|---|---|---|
| 1973 | Primetime Emmy Award | Outstanding Single Program - Variety and Popular Music | Bob Fosse, Fred Ebb, Liza Minnelli | Won |
| 1973 | Primetime Emmy Award | Outstanding Directing for a Comedy-Variety or Music Special | Bob Fosse | Won |
| 1973 | Primetime Emmy Award | Outstanding Achievement in Choreography | Bob Fosse | Won |
| 1973 | Primetime Emmy Award | Outstanding Writing Achievement in Comedy, Variety or Music | Fred Ebb | Nominated |
| 1973 | Primetime Emmy Award | Outstanding Achievement in Music Composition - For a Special Program | Fred Ebb, John Kander | Nominated |
| 1973 | Primetime Emmy Award | Outstanding Achievement in Music, Lyrics and Special Material | Fred Ebb, John Kander | Won |
| 1973 | Primetime Emmy Award | Outstanding Achievement in Cinematography for Entertainment Programming - For a Special or Feature Length Program of a Series | Owen Roizman | Nominated |
| 1973 | Primetime Emmy Award | Outstanding Achievement in Film Editing for Entertainment Programming - For a Special or Feature Length Program of a Series | Alan Heim | Nominated |
| 1973 | Directors Guild of America Award | Outstanding Directorial Achievement in Musical/Variety | Bob Fosse, Kenneth Utt, Paul Ganapoler, John Neukum | Won |
| 1973 | Peabody Award | For Timex All-Star Swing Festival and 'S Wonderful, 'S Marvelous, 'S Gershwin | | Won |
| 2006 | Satellite Award | Best DVD Release of a TV Show | | Nominated |

== Soundtrack ==
An LP of the soundtrack was released in 1972 and followed in the success of the film by becoming a best seller and being certified gold.

== See also ==
- List of American films of 1972
