= The Act (musical) =

- Poster
- Music: John Kander
- Lyrics: Fred Ebb
- Book: George Furth
- Productions: 1977 Chicago; 1977 San Francisco; 1977 Los Angeles; 1977 Broadway

The Act is a musical with a book by George Furth, lyrics by Fred Ebb, and music by John Kander.

It was written to showcase the talents of Kander and Ebb favorite Liza Minnelli, who portrayed Michelle Craig, a fading film star attempting a comeback as a Las Vegas singer. The musical premiered on Broadway in 1977.

== Production ==
Originally titled, Shine It On, The Act played out-of-town tryouts for 15 weeks in Chicago, San Francisco, and Los Angeles. The musical opened on Broadway on October 29, 1977, at the Majestic Theatre, where it ran for 233 performances and six previews.

Directed by Martin Scorsese, choreographed by Ron Lewis (assisted by Betsy Haug), with costumes by Halston, the cast included Barry Nelson, Mark Goddard and Wayne Cilento. Scorsese was romantically linked to Minnelli at the time, and Kander & Ebb felt that he wasn't right for the job. Minnelli was insistent, but after the initial reviews from out of town critics, she acquiesced to their advice. Ron Lewish left the show leaving Betsy Haug to complete the staging, and The New York Times reported that "director Gower Champion quietly came in to doctor the show during its final month in Los Angeles." Scorsese was reportedly relieved. Their romantic affair ended soon after, but have remained life-long friends.

The New York Times reviewer wrote that "The Act is precisely what its name implies: It is an act, and a splendid one. On the other hand, it is a little less than its pretensions imply. Theatrical though it is as a performance, it is indifferent musical theater." Another New York Times writer noted that "If there's a point 'The Act' underscores most, it's that Miss Minnelli on Broadway has incomparable star power."

With an all-time ticket-price high of $25 for Saturday night orchestra seats, The Act had $2 million in advance sales, then the highest in Broadway history. But the production was doomed from the start, with its star, Liza Minnelli, behaving erratically and sometimes missing performances (more than 10% of the entire run). During out-of-town tryouts, Gower Champion was called to help with the staging (but took no directorial credit). Additionally, the original costumes were replaced. With the additional costs and with refund demands running high, it was impossible for the show to recoup its costs.

For her role, Liza Minnelli won the Tony Award for Best Actress in a Musical.

== Cast and characters ==
- Michelle Craig – Liza Minnelli
- Dan Connors – Barry Nelson
- Molly Connors – Gayle Crofoot
- Lenny Kanter – Christopher Barrett
- Charley Price – Mark Goddard
- Arthur/One of the Boys – Roger Minami
- Nat Schrieber – Arnold Soboloff
- Dance Alternate – Claudia Asbury
- Dance Alternate – Brad Witsger
- One of the Boys – Wayne Cilento
- One of the Boys – Michael Leeds
- One of the Boys – Albert Stephenson
- One of the Girls – Carol Estey
- One of the Girls – Laurie Dawn Skinner

== Song list ==
Act I

- "Shine It On" – Michelle Craig and Chorus
- "It's the Strangest Thing" – Michelle Craig
- "Bobo's" – Michelle Craig and Dancers
- "Turning" – Michelle Craig
- "Little Do They Know" – Boys and Girls
- "Arthur in the Afternoon" – Michelle Craig and Arthur
- "Hollywood, California" – Michelle Craig and Dancers
- "The Money Tree" – Michelle Craig

Act II

- "City Lights" – Michelle Craig and Chorus
- "There When I Need Him" – Michelle Craig
- "Hot Enough for You?" – Michelle Craig and Dancers
- "Little Do They Know" (Reprise) – Boys and Girls
- "My Own Space" – Michelle Craig
- "Walking Papers" – Michelle Craig

== Awards and nominations ==
=== Original Broadway production ===
Year	Award	Category	Nominee	Result
1978	Tony Award	Best Original Score	Kander and Ebb	Nominated
1978	Tony Award	Best Performance by a Leading Actor in a Musical	Barry Nelson	Nominated
1978	Tony Award	Best Performance by a Leading Actress in a Musical	Liza Minnelli	Won
1978	Tony Award	Best Choreography	Ron Lewis	Nominated
1978	Tony Award	Best Costume Design	Halston	Nominated
1978	Tony Award	Best Lighting Design	Tharon Musser	Nominated
