= Train wreck (disambiguation) =

A train wreck is a train crash. Train wreck may also refer to:

== Music ==
- Trainwreck (band), a heavy metal band from Bangladesh founded in 2007
- Trainwreck (album), a 2005 album by Boys Night Out
- "Trainwreck" (Banks song), a 2016 song from the album The Altar
- "Trainwreck", a song by Mastodon from their 2002 album Remission
- "Trainwreck", a song by Demi Lovato from her 2008 album Don't Forget
- "Train Wreck" (James Arthur song), a song by James Arthur from the 2016 album Back from the Edge
- Trainwreck with Kyle Gass, southern comedic rock band featuring Kyle Gass of Tenacious D, founded in 2002

== Film and television ==
- Trainwreck (film), a 2015 American comedy film starring Amy Schumer
- Trainwreck: My Life as an Idiot, also known as American Loser, a 2007 comedy film starring Seann William Scott
- "Train Wreck", a 1999 episode of the sitcom The King of Queens
- Trainwreck (Netflix), a series of documentaries produced by Netflix about situations that became chaotic and destructive, among which the following topics have distinct articles:
  - Trainwreck: Woodstock '99, a 2022 US three-part docuseries about the Woodstock '99 music festival, the first installment of the above series
  - Trainwreck: The Astroworld Tragedy, a 2025 documentary film about a 2021 crowd crush incident at a concert in Houston, Texas, featuring Travis Scott
  - Trainwreck: Mayor of Mayhem, a 2025 documentary film about the mayoralty of Rob Ford in Toronto, Canada
  - Trainwreck: The Cult of American Apparel, a 2025 documentary film about the company American Apparel and its CEO, Dov Charney
  - Trainwreck: The Real Project X, a 2025 documentary film about a Dutch teenager's party in 2012 that became a viral phenomenon attracting tens of thousands of unruly visitors to the town

== Other ==
- Train wreck cluster, an astronomical galaxy cluster, also known as Abell 520
- Trainwreckstv, an American livestreamer, active 2015–present

== See also ==
- Train Wreck Records, an independent record label founded by Chip Taylor
- Trainwreck Circuits, an American boutique guitar amplifier manufacturer
- Train wrecker (Neolentinus lepideus), a mushroom
