= Trainwreck: Woodstock '99 =

2022 US television documentary miniseries

- Poster
- Genre: Documentary
- Directed by: Jamie Crawford
- Country of origin: United States
- Original language: English
- No. of seasons: 1
- No. of episodes: 3

Production
- Producers: Cassandra Hamar Thornton; Sasha Kosminsky
- Cinematography: Jeff Hutchens; Adam Stone
- Editors: Chris Duveen; Bjorn Johnson; Hugh Williams

Original release
- Network: Netflix
- Release: August 3, 2022

Trainwreck: Woodstock '99 (also known as Clusterf**k: Woodstock '99) is a 2022 American three-part docuseries about the music festival Woodstock '99. It was released on Netflix on August 3, 2022. The series entered the Netflix charts at No. 8, with 20.3 million hours viewed. It became the first of the Trainwreck documentary franchise, which Netflix revived in 2025 for more documentaries on infamous cultural events: The Astroworld Tragedy, Mayor of Mayhem, Poop Cruise, The Cult of American Apparel, and The Real Project X

== Background ==
The docuseries depicts the events leading up to the violence and sexual assaults that occurred during the Woodstock 1999 festival. Many concert goers and some musicians who performed at the festival such as Gavin Rossdale, Jonathan Davis, and Fatboy Slim, depict their experiences during the three day festival. Carson Daly, who hosted MTV's TRL from 1998 to 2003, was there to cover the festival. Daly stated "It started off great, TRL live from the side of main stage interviewing all the bands (like Jay from Jamiroquai)". He "started getting pelted with bottles, rocks, lighters, all of it. It got insane, fast. Nightfall, Limp plays 'Break Stuff' & the prisoners were officially running the prison". While inside the production van, Daly said, "I remember being in a production van driving recklessly through corn fields to get to safety. It was so crazy & a blur now. I just remember feeling like I was in another country during military conflict," during which he thought at some point he was "going to die".

== Cast ==
Many people appear in the documentary series, such as attendees, workers, and music artists. These people include:

- Ananda Lewis - MTV Presenter
- Colin Speir - Production Team
- David Blaustein - ABC News Reporter
- Heather Eason Liposky - Concert Goer
- John Scher - Woodstock Promoter
- Kyle - Stage Security
- Michael Lang - Woodstock Co-Founder
- Sara - Concert Goer
- Pilar Law - Michael Lang's Assistant
- Lee Rosenblatt - Assistant Site Manager
- Keith - Concert Goer
- Scott Vincent - Videographer
- Jonathan Davis - Lead Singer of Korn
- Gavin Rossdale - Lead Singer of Bush
- Jewel Kilcher - Performer at the festival
- Fatboy Slim - Performer at the festival
- A.J. Srybnik - Rave Production Manager
- Tom - Concert Goer
- Lisa Law - Woodstock Photographer
- Tim Healy - MTV Producer
- Jeff Rowland - Executive Metropolitan Entertainment
- Joe Griffo - Former Mayor of Rome, New York
- Chris - Stage Security
- Cody - Peace Patrol
- Peter Katsis - Former Manager for Limp Bizkit
- Aaron Sadovsky - Woodstock TV Producer
- Joe Patterson - Public Health Inspector
- Joe Pena - Paramedic
- Dan Gross - Co-Founder of Pax Anti-Gun Violence Charity
- Dan Flynn - Head of Security Planning

== Episodes ==
No.	Title	Directed by	Original release date
1	"How the F**k Did This Happen?"	Jamie Crawford	August 3, 2022
2	"Kerosene. Match. Boom!"	Jamie Crawford	August 3, 2022
3	"You Can't Stop a Riot in the 90s"	Jamie Crawford	August 3, 2022

== Release ==
The trailer for Trainwreck: Woodstock '99 was released on July 20, 2022, and the documentary was released on Netflix on August 3, 2022.

== Reception ==
On the review aggregator website Rotten Tomatoes, the series holds an approval rating of 88% based on 24 reviews and a weighted average rating of 7/10. The website's consensus reads, "Harrowing but enlightening, Trainwreck is a comprehensive investigation into the structural forces that led to one of the music industry's most infamous disasters." On Metacritic, it was given a normalized score of 76 out of 100 based on 7 critics, indicating "generally favorable reviews".

The series entered the Netflix charts at No. 8, with 20.3 million hours viewed. Netflix would in 2025 revive the Trainwreck name for more documentaries on infamous events, such as The Astroworld Tragedy, Mayor of Mayhem, Poop Cruise, The Cult of American Apparel, and The Real Project X.

== See also ==
- Woodstock 99: Peace, Love, and Rage
