= Trainwreck (film series) =

Netflix documentary series

Trainwreck is a series of documentary films and television miniseries distributed on Netflix.

== Summary ==
Each installment of Trainwreck delves into major public disasters and cultural breakdowns, spotlighting a single event that unraveled in real time and examining the human and systemic failures through interviews and archival footage.

== Releases ==
Name	Date	Format	Subject
Trainwreck: Woodstock '99	August 3, 2022	3 part miniseries	Woodstock '99
Trainwreck: The Astroworld Tragedy	June 10, 2025	80 minute feature	Astroworld Festival crowd crush
Trainwreck: Mayor of Mayhem	June 17, 2025	49 minute feature	Mayoralty of Rob Ford
Trainwreck: Poop Cruise	June 24, 2025	55 minute feature	2013 breakdown of the Carnival Triumph
Trainwreck: The Cult of American Apparel	July 1, 2025	54 minute feature	Sexual harassment lawsuits among American Apparel
Trainwreck: The Real Project X	July 8, 2025	48 minute feature	Project X Haren
Trainwreck: Balloon Boy	July 15, 2025	52 minute feature	Balloon boy hoax
Trainwreck: P.I. Moms	July 22, 2025	45 minute feature	P.I. Moms
Trainwreck: Storm Area 51	July 29, 2025	2 part miniseries	Storm Area 51

== See also ==
- Woodstock 99: Peace, Love, and Rage - 2021 documentary about aforementioned festival by HBO Documentary Films
