= Christopher Butler =

Christopher Butler may refer to

- Christopher Butler (bishop) (1902–1986), English bishop and monk
- Christopher Butler (literary scholar) (1940–2020), English academic, professor of English language and literature at the University of Oxford
- Christopher Butler (private investigator), American detective

== See also ==
- Chris Butler (disambiguation)
