= Lisa Law =

American photographer and filmmaker

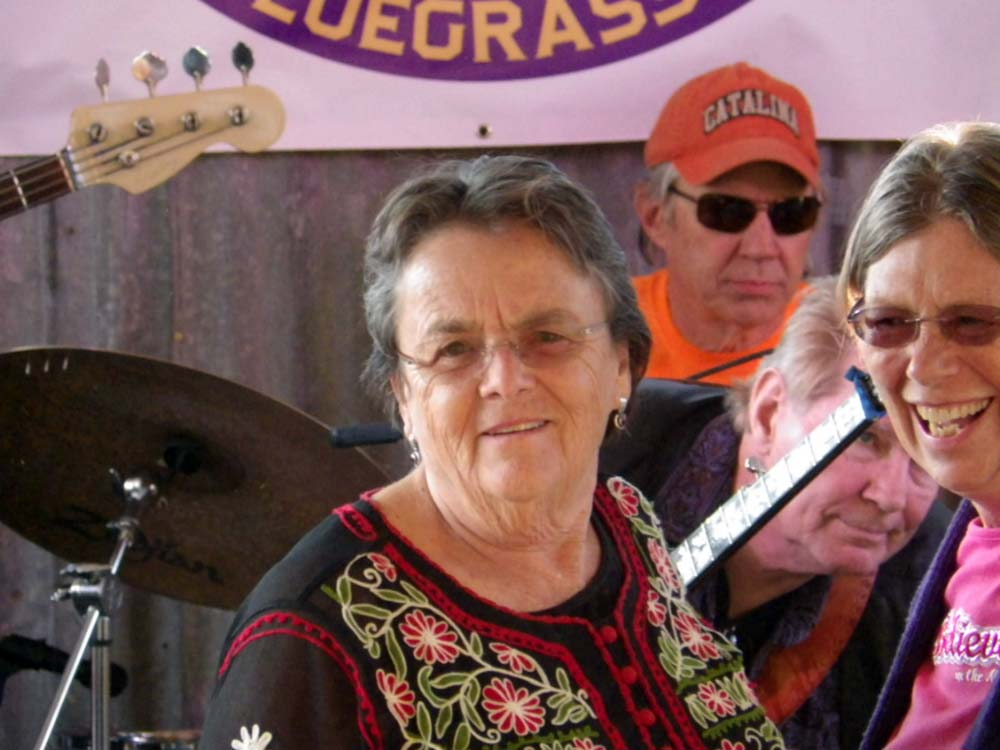
- Lisa Law, Madrid, New Mexico, 12 October 2013
- Born: Lisa Jo Bachelis; March 8, 1943 (age 83); Los Angeles County, California
- Children: Pilar Law
- Relatives: John Phillip Law

Lisa Law is an American photographer and filmmaker of 1960s counterculture best known, with Peter Whiterabbit, for photographing the 1969 Woodstock festival, where she also organised food. She was also involved in the organisation of the Woodstock '99 festival.

== Early life ==
Lisa Bachelis was born to Selma (née Mikels), an attorney, and Lee Bachelis, a furrier. She has two brothers, Gregory Frank and Guy and she grew up in Burbank, California. Bachelis attended John Burroughs High School in Burbank, Galileo High School in San Francisco, California, the College of Marin in Marin County, California, and San Francisco City College.

== Career ==
In Los Angeles in 1964, Bachelis became a personal assistant to Frank Werber, the manager of The Kingston Trio. He gave her a Honeywell Pentax camera and she began taking pictures of the musicians in the Bay Area and Los Angeles music scenes.

In 1965, Bachelis met Tom Law, the road manager for Peter, Paul and Mary. Law, his brother John Phillip Law, and their friend, Jack Simons, owned a four-story mansion in Los Feliz, known as the Castle. Bachelis and Law married the same year, and she moved into the mansion, where she took photographs of visiting musicians and artists, including Andy Warhol, Bob Dylan and Barry McGuire.

After living in Yelapa, Mexico, for a short time in 1966, Law chronicled the lives of the flower children in Haight Ashbury. She carried her camera wherever she went, to the Human Be-In, the anti-Vietnam march in San Francisco, the Monterey Pop Festival, and meetings of The Diggers. Law then joined those who migrated to the communes of New Mexico in the late Sixties and early Seventies. She has gone on to specialize in documenting homeless people in San Francisco, the El Salvadorian's resistance against military oppression, and the Navajo and Hopi nations struggling to preserve their ancestral religious sites, traditions, and land.

She and her former husband, Tom Law, lived together on a farm in Truchas, New Mexico, for 12 years and had four children, including photographer Pilar Law. They divorced in 1977.

Law moved to Santa Fe, New Mexico. She has been involved in the building of the El Museo de Historia, Arte y Cultura de Yelapa museum in Yelapa, Mexico.

== Woodstock ==
At the 1969 Woodstock festival, Law asked the festival organizers for $3,000 to buy rolled oats, bulgur wheat, wheat germ, dried apricots, currants, almonds, soy sauce, and honey to make muesli. Volunteers fed around 130,000 people with Dixie cups.

Law was also involved in organising the Woodstock '99 festival, and appears in the documentary series Trainwreck: Woodstock '99 where she talked about the difference between the two festivals.

== Works ==
- Flashing on the Sixties, Squarebooks, Santa Rosa, CA, 1987
- Interviews with Icons: Flashing on the Sixties, Lumen Books, Santa Fe, New Mexico, 2000
- Beneath the Diamond Sky: Haight-Ashbury 1965-1970, Barney Hoskins, Simon & Schuster Editions, 1997

== Film ==
- Flashing on the Sixties: A tribal document by Lisa Law, Flashback Productions Ltd. 1994

== CD cover photographs ==
- Dezeo: Jewish Music From Spain by Consuelo Luz, Wagram Music, 2000
