= Chris Butler =

Chris Butler may refer to:

- Chris Butler (actor), portrayed the Cousin in Torchwood and Matan Brody in The Good Wife
- Chris Butler (cyclist) (born 1988), American cyclist, in the 2011 BMC Racing Team season
- Chris Butler (diplomat), New Zealand ambassador to South Korea and the Netherlands
- Chris Butler (filmmaker) (born 1974), an English storyboard artist, writer and director
- Chris Butler (ice hockey) (born 1986), American ice hockey player
- Chris Butler (musician) (born 1949), American musician with The Waitresses
- Chris Butler (politician) (born 1950), British Conservative Party politician
- Chris Butler (private investigator), American private investigator and former police officer
- Chris A. Butler (1952–1994), American set decorator
- Chris Butler, also known as Jagad Guru Siddhaswarupananda Paramahamsa, founder of Science of Identity Foundation

== See also ==
- Christopher Butler (disambiguation)
