= David Blaustein =

American journalist

David Blaustein is a former entertainment correspondent and movie critic for ABC News Radio and frequent contributor to ABC News Now.

Blaustein attended Buffalo State College at which time he landed his first professional radio job with WWKB-AM as a board operator and talk radio producer. While at WWKB-AM, he was offered his first professional on-air gig as a lifestyles reporter for WWKB's sister station, WKSE-FM (KISS 98.5). Blaustein continued to attend college full-time, work at both radio stations and create and co-host a popular talk show on the campus radio station, WBNY-FM, called "Misinformation." Mr. Blaustein's co-host was novelist Micah Nathan, author of Simon and Schuster's Gods of Aberdeen.

Blaustein once served as a radio Producer for Alan Colmes of the Fox News Channel's Hannity and Colmes, and nationally syndicated radio personality Barry Farber.

Blaustein has conducted countless celebrity interviews, broken several major entertainment stories, covered the red carpet at the Oscars and has written, produced, and hosted nearly 20 one-hour entertainment related radio specials.

Blaustein's work was heard on ABC News Radio affiliates around the United States. Many of his interviews and guest appearances can be found on YouTube and Vimeo

== Trainwreck: Woodstock '99 ==
Blaustein is featured in the Netflix series Trainwreck: Woodstock '99. Blaustein, a young reporter for ABC News Radio in 1999, is the first person we see in the series, with archival footage of him participating in an interview in the aftermath of the ill-fated festival.

The titles of episodes 1 and 2, "How the F**k Did This Happen" and "Kerosene. Match. Boom!" are based on quotes from him.
