= Trainwreck: The Cult of American Apparel =

2025 American documentary film by Sally Rose Griffiths

- Film poster
- Directed by: Sally Rose Griffiths
- Produced by: Georgia Jasper
- Starring: Dov Charney
- Cinematography: Ryan Earl Parker
- Distributed by: Netflix
- Release date: July 1, 2025
- Running time: 54 minutes
- Country: United States
- Language: English

Trainwreck: The Cult of American Apparel is a 2025 American documentary film directed by Sally Rose Griffiths. It premiered on Netflix on July 1, 2025, as part of the Trainwreck series.

== Synopsis ==
The film documents what was occurring with American Apparel while it was led by founder and CEO Dov Charney. It documented firsthand accounts of former employees who alleged abuse and misconduct while working at the company. After allegations of sexual misconduct against female employees, Charney was ousted as CEO.

== Cast ==
- Helen Laurens
- Maddie Sherston
- Anisay Taha

=== Archival footage ===
- Fred Armisen
- Beyonce
- Jason Carroll
- Dov Charney
- Katie Couric
- Ann Curry
- Robert Greene
- Ana Kasparian
- Kimbra Lo
- Allan Mayer
- Terry Moran
- Barack Obama
- Chelsea Peretti
- Rihanna
- Christine Romans
- Charlie Rose
- Britney Spears
- John Stossel
- Cenk Uygur
- Meredith Vieira
- Ye
