= Liza's at The Palace.... =

- Original poster
- Productions: Broadway; December 3, 2008 - January 4, 2009

Liza's at The Palace....

Cast recording by Liza Minnelli,
- Released: February 3, 2009
- Genres: Traditional pop Jazz; Show tunes
- Label: Hybrid Recordings
- Producer: John Scher

Liza Minnelli, chronology
The Complete A&M Recordings (2008)	Liza's at The Palace.... (2009)	Cabaret... And All That Jazz (2010)

Liza's at the Palace.... was a concert presented by Liza Minnelli at the Palace Theatre on Broadway from December 3, 2008, through January 4, 2009. It was produced by John Scher and Metropolitan Talent Presents.

It was directed and choreographed by Ron Lewis, with vocal arrangements by Kay Thompson and Billy Stritch. Minnelli performed with four dancer-singers: Cortes Alexander, Jim Caruso, Tiger Martina, and Johnny Rodgers. The concert contained songs written by Kander and Ebb, among others.

The first act included a revised version of a vaudeville tribute her mother once performed at the Palace. The second act included a "re-creation of [Kay] Thompson's celebrated nightclub act with the four Williams brothers".

== Critical response ==
Professional ratings
Review scores
Source	Rating
AllMusic	4/5 stars

Stephen Holden of The New York Times said

From the moment Ms. Minnelli joins forces with a male singing and dancing quartet to resurrect parts of a famous nightclub act Thompson created in the late 1940s and early ’50s with the Williams Brothers, the Palace Theater blasts off into orbit. There it remains, deliriously spinning until the end of a 2-hour-20-minute show (with intermission) that leaves the star in a state of breathless exaltation. The end of the opening-night show on Wednesday found Ms. Minnelli panting, drenched in sweat, her hair matted, as if she had just finished running the New York marathon, which in a sense she had... I would love to report that Ms. Minnelli’s voice and physical agility have been magically restored to their former glory, but those days seem to be gone. On Wednesday night her voice was in tatters, her diction unsteady. When she belted, her wide vibrato wobbled to the breaking point. Most of her s’s were slurred sh’s. Frequently short of breath, she swallowed phrases. Many of her highest notes were dry, piercing caws. But there were still occasional moments of beautifully focused dramatic singing... As for movement, there were no kicks or even half-kicks, although Ms. Minnelli can still strut stealthily and sprawl across a director’s chair in sensual abandon... Once the show began to soar, though, Ms. Minnelli’s force of will became a triumph of spirit over flesh. As she insisted on doing what she can no longer do, her audacity was inspiring: her message was you do the best you can, and if you have to, fake it. She trusted the listener’s imagination to fill in the blanks.

In Variety, David Rooney observed,

In her return to Broadway after nearly 10 years’ absence, Minnelli had the opening-night audience in the palm of her hand from her first moment onstage - striking that signature, one-arm-pointed-skyward pose, appropriately framed by a giant pink triangle of light... [W]hat makes Minnelli a great entertainer when she's firing on all cylinders is how hard she works for the audience's love. And how much she clearly thrives on it. In an age in which so many female concert performers are overproduced automatons, deigning to be worshipped by their fans, Minnelli's emotional give-and-take makes her a disarming relic... Sure, the voice is frayed and husky, the control wavers, many of the lyrics are slurred and the big belt at times hides behind the orchestra's ample brass section to disguise the effort. But nobody who would buy a ticket to this show in the first place is going to care a whit. Minnelli's charisma is undiminished and her vocals still have power, warmth and a startling ability to make every song personal.

Brian Scott Lipton of Theatermania.com stated,

To get the big questions out of the way, Minnelli's voice isn't what it was many years ago, but it's strong and powerful and mostly gets the job done, and she moves rather than really dances. But her skills as a performer, honed over five decades, and her genuineness and vulnerability make these shortcomings seem relatively unimportant.

== Awards and nominations ==
Minnelli won the 2009 Independent Theatre Reviewers Association Award for Best Female Theatrical Performance and a Drama Desk Award "Special Award" for a "beloved American musical theater icon, for her enduring career of sustained excellence, and her glorious performance in Liza's at The Palace." The show also won the Tony Award for Best Special Theatrical Event.

The production was nominated for the Drama Desk Award for Outstanding Musical and the Drama League Award for Distinguished Production of a Musical.

== Recording ==
A 2-CD set with liner notes by Michael Feinstein was released on February 3, 2009, on Hybrid Recordings. It debuted at #42 on the Billboard Independent Albums chart and at #3 on the Top Cast Albums chart, but failed to chart on the Billboard 200. The album was nominated for the Grammy Award for Best Traditional Pop Vocal Album on December 2, 2009.

== Musical numbers ==
ACT I

- "Teach Me Tonight" – Lyrics by Sammy Cahn; Music by Gene DePaul
- "I Would Never Leave You" – Music and lyrics by Billy Stritch, Johnny Rodgers, and Brian Lane Green
- "If You Hadn't, But You Did" – Lyrics by Betty Comden and Adolph Green; Music by Jule Styne
- "What Makes a Man a Man?" – Music and lyrics by Charles Aznavour
- "My Own Best Friend" – Lyrics by Fred Ebb; Music by John Kander
- "Maybe This Time" – Lyrics by Fred Ebb; Music by John Kander
- "He's Funny That Way" – Lyrics by Richard Whiting; Music by Neil Moret
- "Palace Medley" – New introduction by David Zippel, John Kander and Billy Stritch; original song by Roger Edens
- "Cabaret" – Lyrics by Fred Ebb; Music by John Kander

ACT II

- "But the World Goes 'Round" – Lyrics by Fred Ebb; Music by John Kander
- "Hello, Hello" – Music and lyrics by Kay Thompson
- "Jubilee Time" – Music and lyrics by Kay Thompson
- "Basin Street Blues" – Music by Spencer Williams, special lyric by Kay Thompson
- "Clap Yo' Hands" – Lyrics by Ira Gershwin; Music by George Gershwin
- "Liza (All the Clouds'll Roll Away)" – Lyrics by Ira Gershwin and Gus Kahn; Music by George Gershwin
- "I Love a Violin" – Music and lyrics by Thompson
- "My Mammy" – Lyrics by Sam M. Lewis and Joe Young; Music by Walter Donaldson
- "Theme from New York, New York" – Lyrics by Fred Ebb; Music by John Kander
- "I'll Be Seeing You" – Lyrics by Irving Kahal; Music by Sammy Fain

== Public television special ==
Celebrating the one year anniversary of Liza's at the Palace...., American Public Television (APT) distributed the special to public television stations nationwide beginning in November 2009. Filmed in the Hollywood Theatre at the MGM Grand in Las Vegas on September 30 and October 1, 2009, the program featured material performed during the New York engagement.

The concert premiered on the cable network HDNet and was shown three times: November 15, 16 and 22, 2009.
