= Katie Simpson =

Canadian journalist

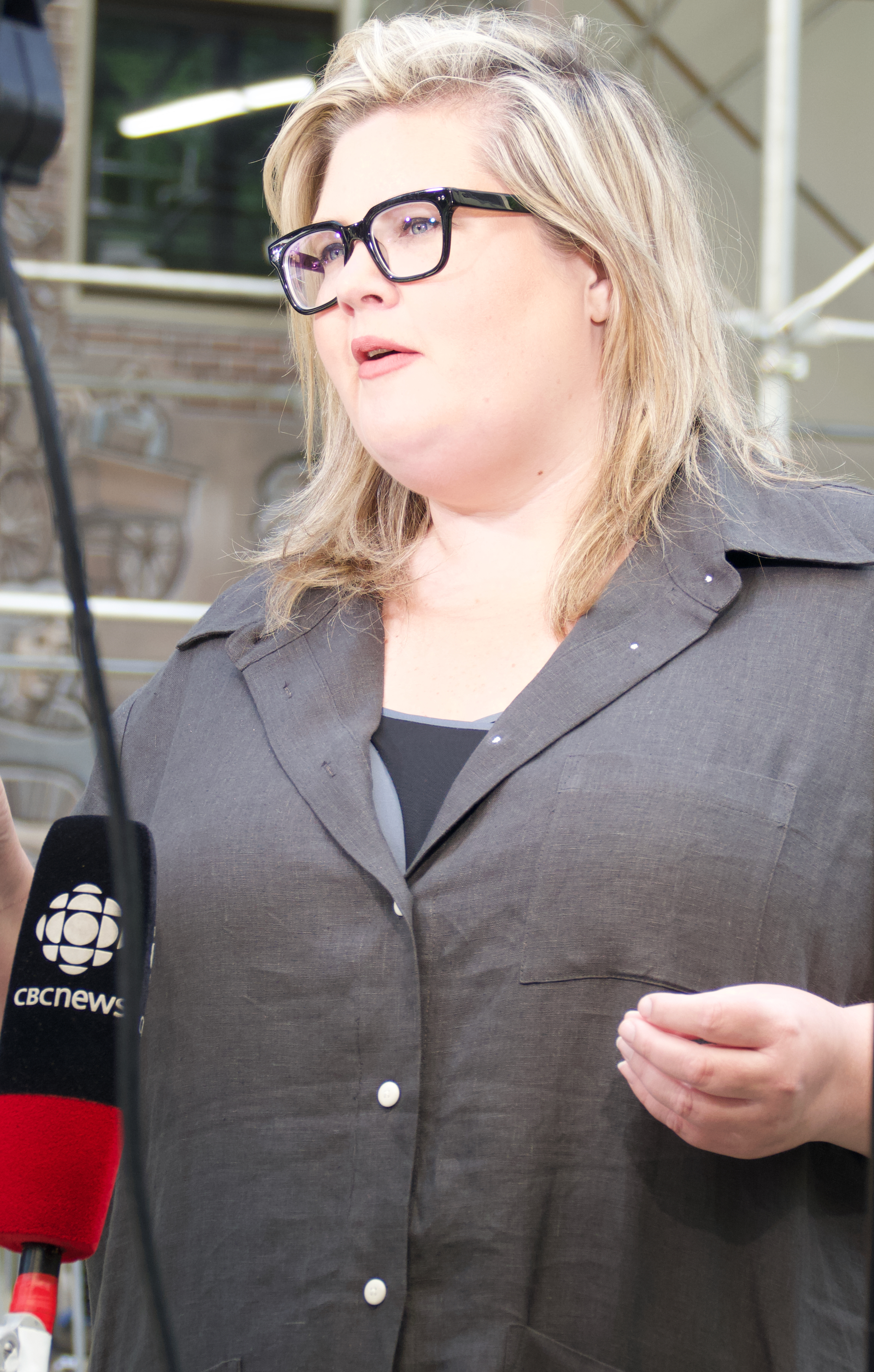
- Simpson in 2024
- Education: University of Western Ontario
- Presenting career
- Network: CBC Television; CBC News Network

Katie Simpson is a Canadian journalist who is currently a foreign correspondent for CBC News based in Washington, D.C.

== Education ==
Simpson holds a bachelor's degree in media, information and techno culture from Western University.

== Career ==
Simpson reported on the Rob Ford video scandal for CP24.

She worked in the parliamentary press gallery in Ottawa until 2019 when she became a foreign correspondent at the CBC News Washington Bureau in October 2019.

Simpson covered the 2019 Canadian federal election and the 2020 United States elections for CBC.

In 2024, she reported on the prosecution of Donald Trump in New York.

== Filmography ==
Year	Film	Type	Role
2025	Trainwreck: Mayor of Mayhem	Documentary	Herself
