= Rob Bats =

Dutch politician (born 1962)

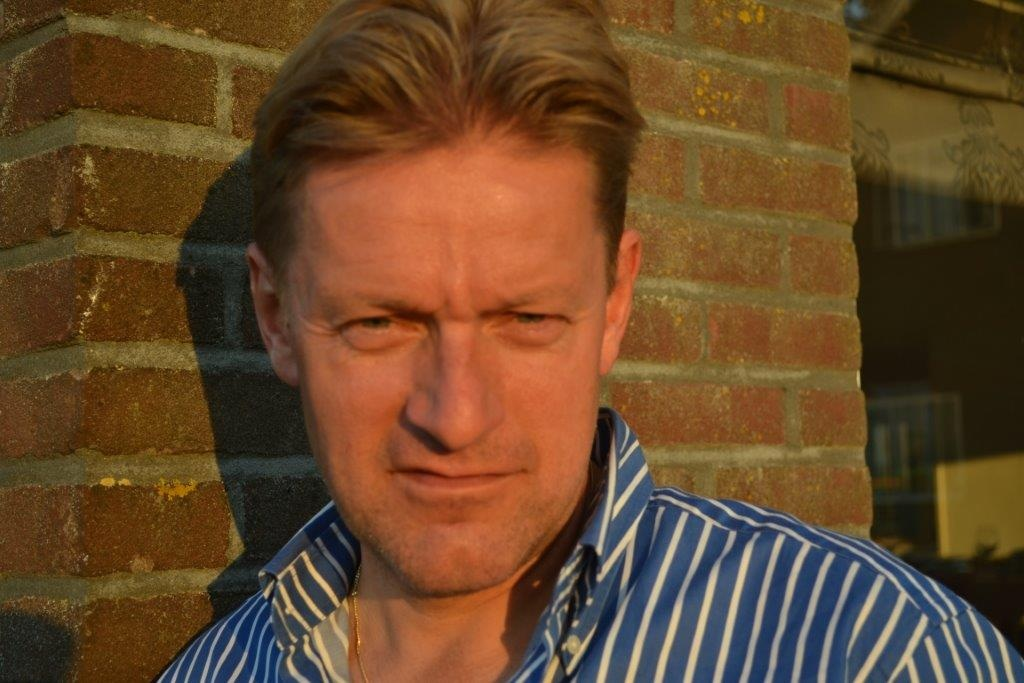
Rob Bats

Jan Hendrik "Rob" Bats (born 1 April 1962 in Winterswijk) is a Dutch politician. He is a member of the People's Party for Freedom and Democracy (VVD).

From 2002 to 2006, he was a member of the municipal council of Meppel. During this time he was also corporate director of the Thorbecke Academy for public administration and public management. From 2007 to 2010, he was a representative for the States Deputed of the province of Drenthe.

From 1 May 2012 to 1 April 2013 he was mayor of Haren, Groningen. He resigned after investigations showed that he acted too late to control the Project X disorder that happened in the town. Previously he worked as a civil servant in Sint Maarten.

From June 2013 to January 2015 he was acting mayor of Terschelling. He then served as acting mayor, then mayor, of Steenwijkerland, becoming acting mayor of Doesburg in April 2026.

Rob Bats studied public administration at the University of Twente. He is married and has two sons.

Political offices
Preceded by Bertus Fennema (ad interim)	Mayor of Haren, Groningen; 2012-2013	Succeeded by Janny Vlietstra
