= Confessions (Liza Minnelli album) =

Studio album by Liza Minnelli
- Released: September 21, 2010
- Genre: Jazz
- Length: 45:20
- Label: Decca
- Producer: Bruce Roberts

Liza Minnelli chronology
Cabaret... And All That Jazz (2009)	Confessions (2010)

Confessions is a studio album by American singer and actress Liza Minnelli, released by the Decca Records label on September 21, 2010. The recording marks her first studio release in nearly fifteen years.

The tracklist includes frequently re-recorded "standards" such as "I Got Lost in His Arms" and "At Last," but it also delves deeper into the Great American Songbook, exploring lesser-known personal favorites. Some media outlets reported that there would be two versions of the album: one with 10 songs and a deluxe edition with an additional five tracks. However, only a 14-track edition was released.

== Background ==
Despite the album's potential to become a notable addition to her discography, Minnelli stated that the origin of Confessions was completely spontaneous and hardly planned. The recordings began when Minnelli showed up at her neighbor Bruce Roberts' door in Beverly Hills late at night, nearly a decade earlier, saying, "I just want to sing." Minnelli relaxed on a couch while Billy Stritch played the keyboard, and she sang 20 old standards while Roberts recorded the session. In an interview, the singer revealed, "Imagine the scene: me with my leg hanging and Billy playing the piano."

In 2009, Roberts found the tapes with these recordings in an old box and realized he had found excellent audio material. According to him, "They (the recordings) were brilliant. So, I [just] enhanced them." He also spoke about the relaxed and spontaneous nature of the tracks: "It's like having Liza singing in your living room." With the recordings in hand, the duo signed a contract with the Decca label in November 2009.

== Promotion ==
As a form of promotion, the singer performed a series of shows in various countries. The setlist included tracks like "All the Way," "I Got Lost in His Arms," "At Last," and "This Heart of Mine," interspersed with career hits such as "Cabaret" and "Ring Them Bells." The show received positive reviews from the media. Some tour dates were canceled after Minnelli was diagnosed with pneumonia. During her stay in Brazil, the singer met with various Brazilian fans, including actress Cláudia Raia.

== Critical reception ==
Professional ratings
Review scores
Source	Rating
AllMusic	3.5/5 stars
PopMatters	8/10 stars

The music critics' reviews for the album were mostly favorable. John Bush of AllMusic gave it three and a half stars out of five, stating that the album takes an intimate approach, without grand orchestral arrangements or grandiose numbers. Minnelli skillfully enriches her aging voice, turning occasional weaknesses into interpretive strengths and conveying warmth in songs like "You Fascinate Me So" and "I Hadn't Anyone Till You."

Christian John Wikane of PopMatters gave it eight out of ten stars, stating that the album is an expanded view of a woman whose greatest gift is to touch the audience, even from the distance between the stage and the last row in the gallery or, in this case, from the recording studio to the sound system in her living room. He concluded that Confessions would be excellent company for the next 14 years.

== Chart performance ==
Confessions peaked at number 196 on the Billboard Top Current Album Sales chart in the issue dated October 9, 2010.

== Track listing ==
Confessions
No.	Title	Writer(s)	Length
1.	"Confession"	Howard Dietz, Arthur Schwartz	1:45
2.	"You Fascinate Me So"	Cy Coleman, Carolyn Leigh	3:10
3.	"All the Way"	Sammy Cahn, Jimmy Van Heusen	4:09
4.	"I Hadn't Anyone Till You"	Ray Noble	2:47
5.	"This Heart of Mine"	Arthur Freed, Harry Warren	2:47
6.	"I Got Lost in His Arms"	Irving Berlin	3:43
7.	"Remind Me"	Dorothy Fields, Jerome Kern	3:05
8.	"Close Your Eyes"	Bernice Petkere	2:53
9.	"He's a Tramp"	Johnny Burke, Peggy Lee	2:33
10.	"I Must Have That Man"	Dorothy Fields, Jimmy McHugh	3:31
11.	"On Such a Night as This"	Marshall Barer, Hugh Martin	3:54
12.	"Moments Like This"	Burton Lane, Frank Loesser	2:46
13.	"If I Had You"	James Campbell, Reginald Connelly, Ted Shapiro	4:48
14.	"At Last"	Mack Gordon, Harry Warren	3:29
Total length:			45:20
