= Trainwreck: P.I. Moms =

2025 American documentary film by Phil Bowman

- Film poster
- Directed by: Phil Bowman
- Produced by: Joe Softley
- Starring: Lucas Platt
- Cinematography: Ryan Earl Parker
- Distributed by: Netflix
- Release date: July 22, 2025
- Running time: 45 minutes
- Country: United States
- Language: English

Trainwreck: P.I. Moms is a 2025 American documentary film directed by Phil Bowman. It appeared on Netflix on July 22, 2025 as part of the Trainwreck series.

== Synopsis ==
The film revisits the rise and fall of a short-lived reality show P.I. Moms, a show about suburban mothers working as private investigators in California. The documentary predominantly focuses on the show's creator, former police officer and convicted criminal Chris Butler.

== Production and reception ==
The documentary features interviews with cast members and producers of the reality show and journalists that covered the show at the time. It follows how the show unraveled after a 2011 This American Life investigation exposed Butler's ties to illegal activity and drug busts. By August 2025, the documentary received 4.8 million views.

== Cast ==
- Lucas Platt
- Denise Antoon
- Ami Wiltz
- Theresa Moore King
- Joanna Pernia
- Pete Crooks
- Chris Flitter
- Daryl Jackson
- Robert Blehm

=== Archival footage ===
- Michelle Allen
- Chris Butler
- Bryan Kohberger
- Carl Marino
- Charmagne Peters
