= Cabaret... And All That Jazz =

Compilation album by Liza Minnelli
- Released: September 6, 2010
- Recorded: 1972–1992
- Genres: Jazz, traditional, synth pop
- Label: Salvo

Liza Minnelli chronology
Liza's at The Palace.... (2009)	Cabaret... And All That Jazz (2010)	Confessions (2010)

Cabaret... And All That Jazz (official title with subtitle: Cabaret... And All That Jazz – The Liza Minnelli Anthology) is a compilation album by American actress and singer Liza Minnelli, released in 2010 under the record label Salvo. It is a double album, released only on CD, spanning Minnelli’s 40-year career with tracks dating from 1973 to 1992.

The album received favorable reviews from music critics but failed to chart on any music charts.

== Album details ==
In total, there are 38 tracks taken from six of the singer’s albums: Liza with a Z (1972), The Singer (1973), Live at the Winter Garden (1974), Tropical Nights (1977), Results (1989), and Live from Radio City Music Hall (1992). With the exception of the track "Cabaret" included in the first album, each disc is divided by the recording format of the songs. The first disc features only studio-recorded songs (taken from The Singer, Tropical Nights, and Results), while the second disc consists of Minnelli’s live recordings (from Liza with a Z, Live at the Winter Garden, and Live from Radio City Music Hall).

The sound of the songs is diverse, as, according to Salvo, throughout her career, "Minnelli remained true to her own style, while enthusiastically responding to changes in popular culture around her," incorporating her versatility and originality into her repertoire.

== Critical reception ==
Professional ratings
Review scores
Source	Rating
AllMusic	3.5/5 stars
Record Collector	4/5 stars

William Ruhlmann from AllMusic rated it three and a half out of five stars, stating that Disc 1 of the compilation suffers from a lack of musical cohesion, as it is dedicated to songs from The Singer ("filled with soft-rock renditions of early '70s hits by other artists"), Tropical Nights ("a disco album"), and Results ("featuring dance music and synth-pop tracks"). He noted that Disc 2 "flows much better" but has issues with song selection, as it excludes Minnelli’s best-known tracks and is mostly composed of songs from Live at the Winter Garden (1974). Ultimately, the critic called the album "just a good anthology."

Record Collector critic Terry Staunton rated it four out of five stars, writing: "The 38 tracks gathered here do a fine job of clarifying (...) and reminding us that Liza (...) is a megastar with a capital M." Regarding Minnelli’s vocal performance, he stated that "the way she can raise her voice or whisper at precisely the moment the lyric demands marks her out as a singer who understands that every song is potentially a piece of drama. She’s playing countless roles, each one utterly convincing."

Martin Townsend of the Daily Express found the song selection careless and claimed Minnelli "wastes her rare talent on clichéd, inappropriate, and even bad tracks. As a positive aspect, he highlighted "A Beautiful Thing" for its light arrangement and the tracks produced by Pet Shop Boys.

A critic from Music Week called it a perfect guide for those wanting to explore the singer’s musical work. They highlighted the generous number of songs from Minnelli’s iconic film soundtracks, as well as interesting covers of 1970s hits. The review also mentions Minnelli’s brief foray into the singles charts and praises the inclusion of contemporary tracks, such as the "excellent reinvention" of Sondheim’s "Losing My Mind" by the Pet Shop Boys.

== Track listing ==
Disc 1
No.	Title	Writer(s)	Album	Length
1.	"Cabaret"	John Kander, Fred Ebb		4:02
2.	"All That Jazz"	John Kander, Fred Ebb	Chicago (soundtrack)	3:07
3.	"Losing My Mind"	Stephen Sondheim	Results	4:13
4.	"Love Pains"	Steve Barri, Michael Price, Dan Walsh	Results	4:13
5.	"Use Me"	Bill Withers	The Singer	3:37
6.	"I Believe In Music"	Mac Davis	The Singer	3:33
7.	"Tropical Nights"	Mark Winkler, Richard Rodgers, Oscar Hammerstein II	Tropical Nights	6:17
8.	"A Beautiful Thing"	Jim Grady	Tropical Nights	3:26
9.	"Oh, Babe, What Would You Say?"	Eileen Sylvia Smith	The Singer	3:34
10.	"You Are The Sunshine Of My Life"	Stevie Wonder	The Singer	2:37
11.	"I'm Your New Best Friend"	Jim Grady, Dave Miller	Tropical Nights	3:07
12.	"Where Is The Love?"	Ralph MacDonald, William Salter	The Singer	2:48
13.	"Don't Let Me Be Lonely"	James Taylor	The Singer	3:54
14.	"The Singer"	Walter Marks	The Singer	2:30
15.	"Baby Don't Get Hooked On Me"	Mac Davis	The Singer	2:52
16.	"Jimi Jimi"	Jim Grady	Tropical Nights	4:00
17.	"Don't Drop Bombs"	Chris Lowe, Neil Tennant	Results	3:39
18.	"So Sorry, I Said"	Lowe, Tennant	Results	3:16
19.	"Tonight Is Forever"	Lowe, Tennant	Results	5:06
20.	"I Can't Say Goodnight"	Lowe, Tennant	Results	4:54

Disc 2
No.	Title	Writer(s)	Album	Length
1.	"Overture"	John Kander, Fred Ebb / John Kander, Fred Ebb / Johnny Nash / John Kander, Fred Ebb / John Kander, Fred Ebb	Live at the Winter Garden	3:35
2.	"Exactly Like Me"	John Kander, Fred Ebb	Live at the Winter Garden	5:12
3.	"The Circle"	John Kander, Fred Ebb	Live at the Winter Garden	4:19
4.	"More Than You Know"	Vincent Youmans, Billy Rose, Edward Eliscu	Live at the Winter Garden	5:06
5.	"I'm One Of The Smart Ones"	John Kander, Fred Ebb	Live at the Winter Garden	3:45
6.	"Natural Man"	John Kander, Fred Ebb	Live at the Winter Garden	3:45
7.	"And I In My Chair [Et Moi Dans Mon Coin]"	Charles Aznavour, Fred Ebb, David Newburge	Live at the Winter Garden	4:15
8.	"There Is A Time [Le Temps]"	Gene Lees, Charles Aznavour, Jeff Davis	Live at the Winter Garden	2:14
9.	"Quiet Thing"	John Kander, Fred Ebb	Live at the Winter Garden	3:41
10.	"Son Of A Preacher Man"	Hurley, Wilkins	Liza with a Z	3:22
11.	"God Bless The Child"	Herzog, Billie Holiday	Liza with a Z	2:59
12.	"It Was A Good Time"	Mike Curb, David, Maurice Jarre	Liza with a Z	4:54
13.	"Stepping Out"	Kander, Ebb	Live from Radio City Music Hall	7:35
14.	"Some People"	Kander, Ebb	Live from Radio City Music Hall	3:20
15.	"If You Could Read My Mind [Come Back To Me]"	Gordon Lightfoot / Burton Lane, Alan Jay Lerner	Live at the Winter Garden	3:06
16.	"My Mammy"	Donaldson, Lewis, Young	Liza with a Z	3:17
17.	"Anywhere You Are [I Believe You]"	John Kander, Fred Ebb	Live at the Winter Garden	3:48
18.	"Theme from New York, New York"	Kander, Ebb	Live from Radio City Music Hall	3:19

== Personnel ==
Credits adapted from Cabaret... And All That Jazz - The Liza Minnelli Anthology CD.

- Design (Package Design) – Rachel Gutek
- Liner Notes – Lisa Martland
- Project Manager (Project Management) – Tony Hilton
