= Michelle Lambert =

American singer-songwriter and musician (born 1985)

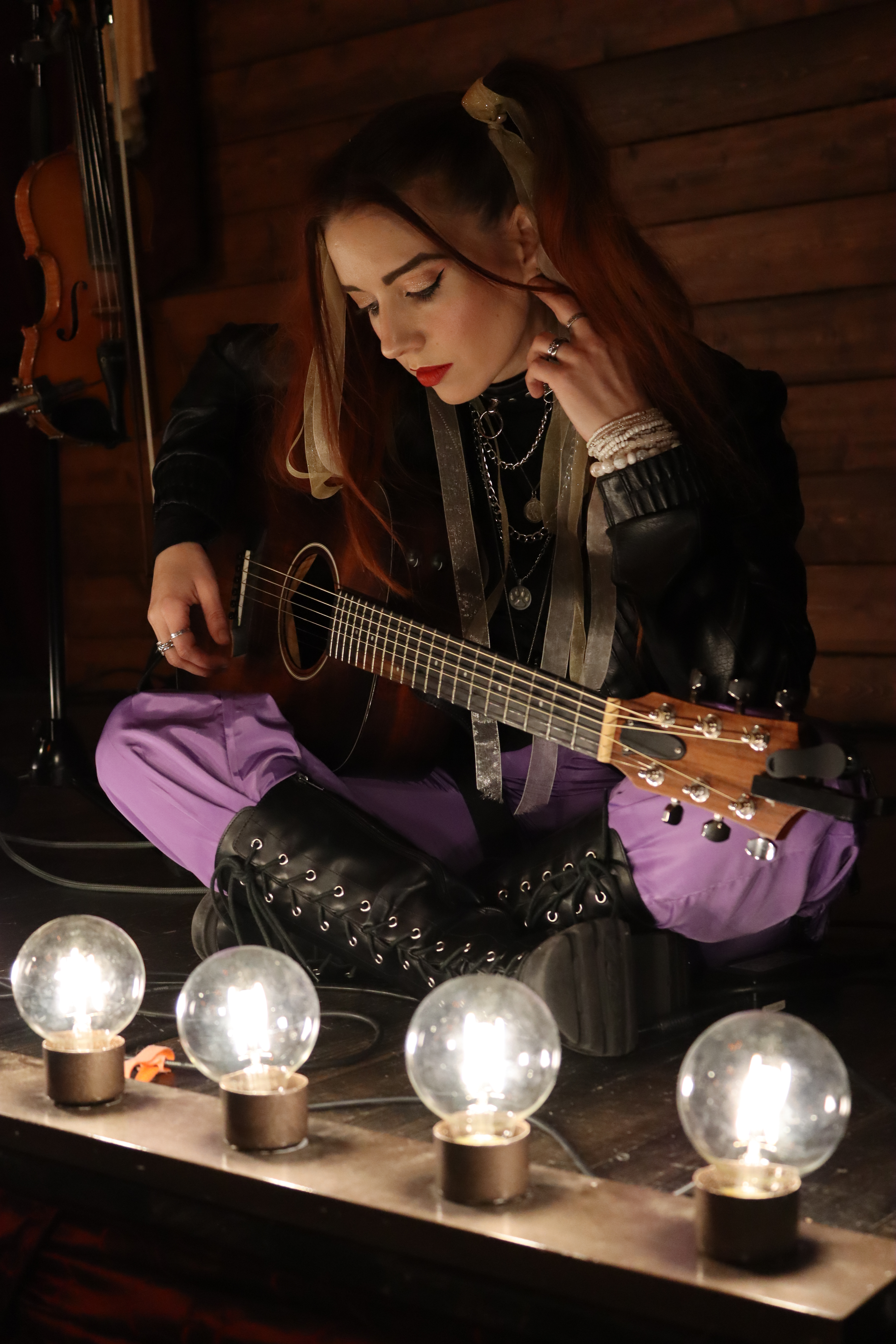
- Lambert during soundcheck in 2023

Background information
- Born: Michelle Marie Lambert; May 2, 1985 (age 41); Covelo, California, US
- Origin: San Francisco Bay Area, California, US
- Genres: Pop; folk-pop; Hip Hop
- Occupations: Singer; songwriter; violinist; record producer
- Instruments: Vocals; Violin; Guitar; Piano
- Years active: 2015–present
- Website: michellelambert.com

Michelle Lambert (born May 2, 1985) is an American singer-songwriter and musician.

== Early life and education ==
Born in Covelo, California, and raised in the Bay Area, Michelle Lambert started studying the violin when she was two years old under the Suzuki Method. At the age of 14 she was already working as a professional violinist in Northern California. In 2008, she moved to Boston where she attended the Berklee College of Music on a full scholarship, majoring in Professional Music.

Lambert became a Catholic at the age of 12 and briefly considered a vocation to religious life at 19. According to the singer, a visit to the Salesian Sisters ended up showing her that music was her true calling.

In an interview for Asia Pop 40, Lambert told Dom Lau (host of the show and former Channel V VJ and E! News Asia) that she considered a career in private aviation in her teenage years. She started training and logged 100 hours of flight time while pursuing her pilot's license.

== Career ==
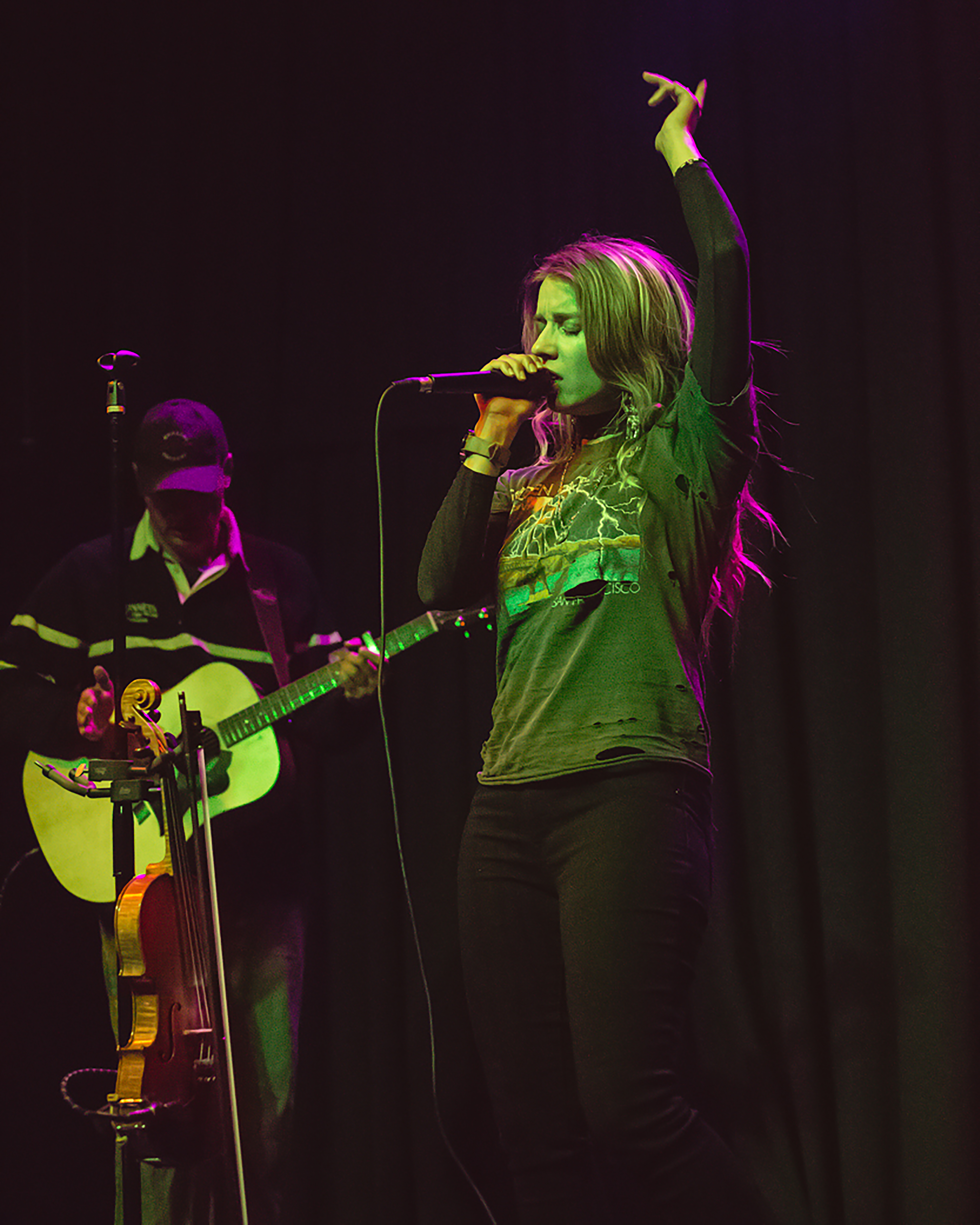
Michelle Lambert live in Oakland in 2018

While in Boston attending Berklee College of Music, she was part of the Captain Wolf Band and got featured in 3 songs from their debut CD as a singer and songwriter. Lambert's participation on the album was so notable that she was even featured in the cover of the CD. Despite being a self-release, the album was well received and became a "jukebox star," being featured in over 28,000 jukeboxes across North America.

Lambert moved to Nashville in 2011 after graduating from Berklee to pursue a career as a studio and stage musician.

Michelle toured with country rapper Jessta James during 2013 and part of 2014 as a violinist and backup singer.

In 2014, she had her first experience performing overseas as part of Johnny Rodgers' band during their US Embassy and the US Department of State's American Music Abroad tour in Malaysia.

In early 2015, Lambert released her first official music video with her rendition of "The Devil Went Down to Georgia" featuring Regi Wooten from the Wooten Brothers on the electric guitar.

One of Lambert's highlights during her Nashville years was the halftime performance at the NCAA women's basketball national semifinals (Final Four) in 2014 in front of 18,000 people at the Bridgestone Arena.

Following 4 years in Nashville, she released her debut album Warrior in 2015 after relocating to Los Angeles, California. That album was a turning point in her career, the moment where she decided to pursue being a solo artist. Warrior has the collaboration of Grammy winners Shannon Sanders (president of the Nashville Grammy Chapter) and Billy Hume. It also features three time Grammy nominee Kief Brown as a co-author of "Rain on You" and singing a verse in "I'm Just a Girl".

On January 9, 2015, she made the front page of the Reporter-Herald in an article about her official music video "Warrior", which spotlights high school football players during a game.

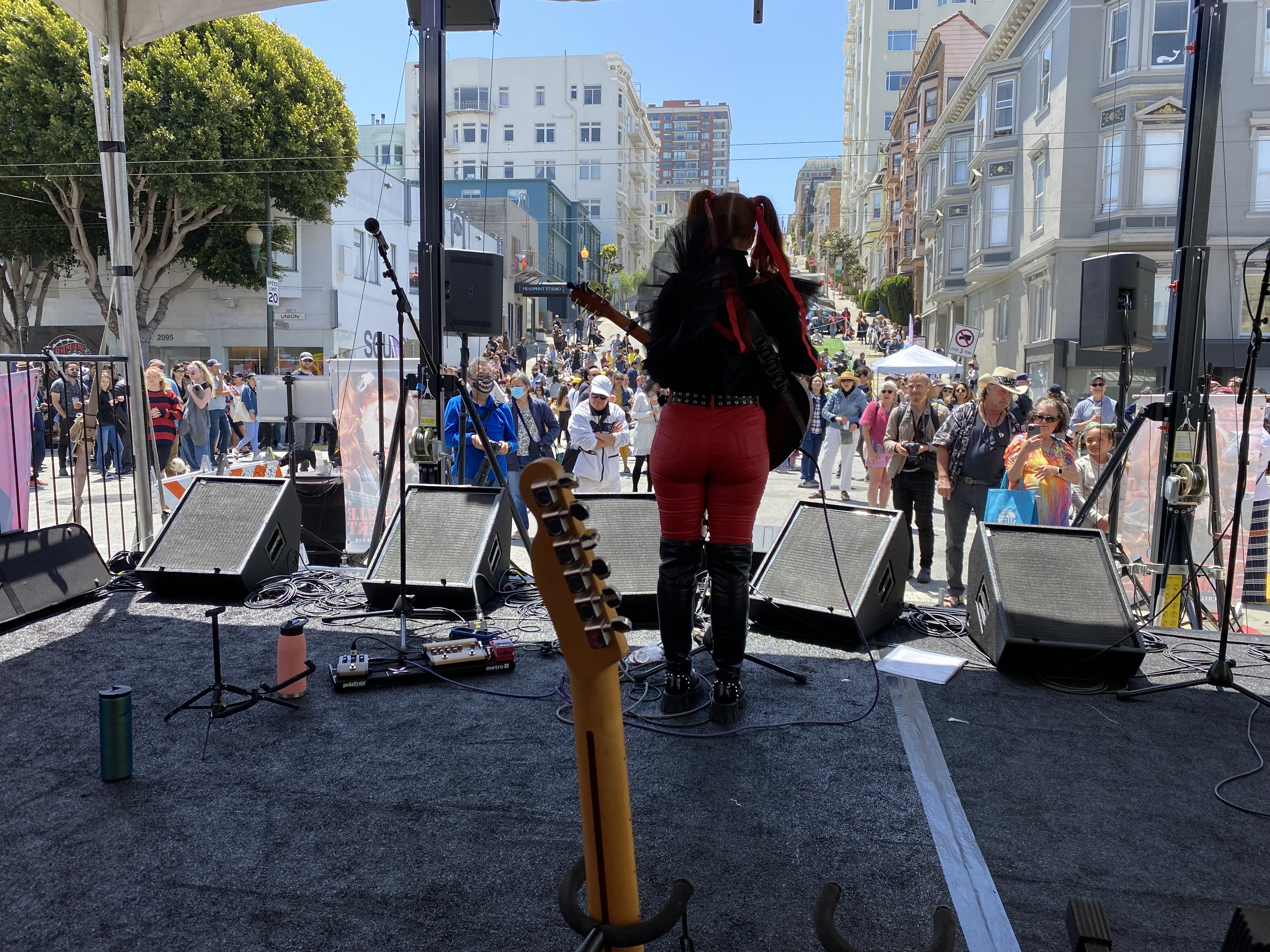
Michelle Lambert at Union Street Festival 2023 – San Francisco, CA

In January 2016, she was elected to be the female face of SkyHigh Radio in the UK. In February 2016, she gave a long interview to the Sound Profile Magazine, where she explains in detail how important women empowerment (that's a recurrent theme in her songs) is for her.

The second official EP Angel was released in February 2017. The album was written, executed, recorded, and produced by Lambert.

In December 2017, "My California" was released as a single by the artist, and after the attention received from the release in Northern California, she decided to relocate to the Bay Area.

In early 2020, the singer released the single "Girl on Fire", an autobiographical song that shows a change of tone from her 2015 release I'm Just a Girl. It starts with a girl trying to find the courage to follow her dreams to one actually fighting for it.

In February 2021, the release of the love song "Come to Me" reached number 1 on the indie charts in New York City.

== Artistry ==
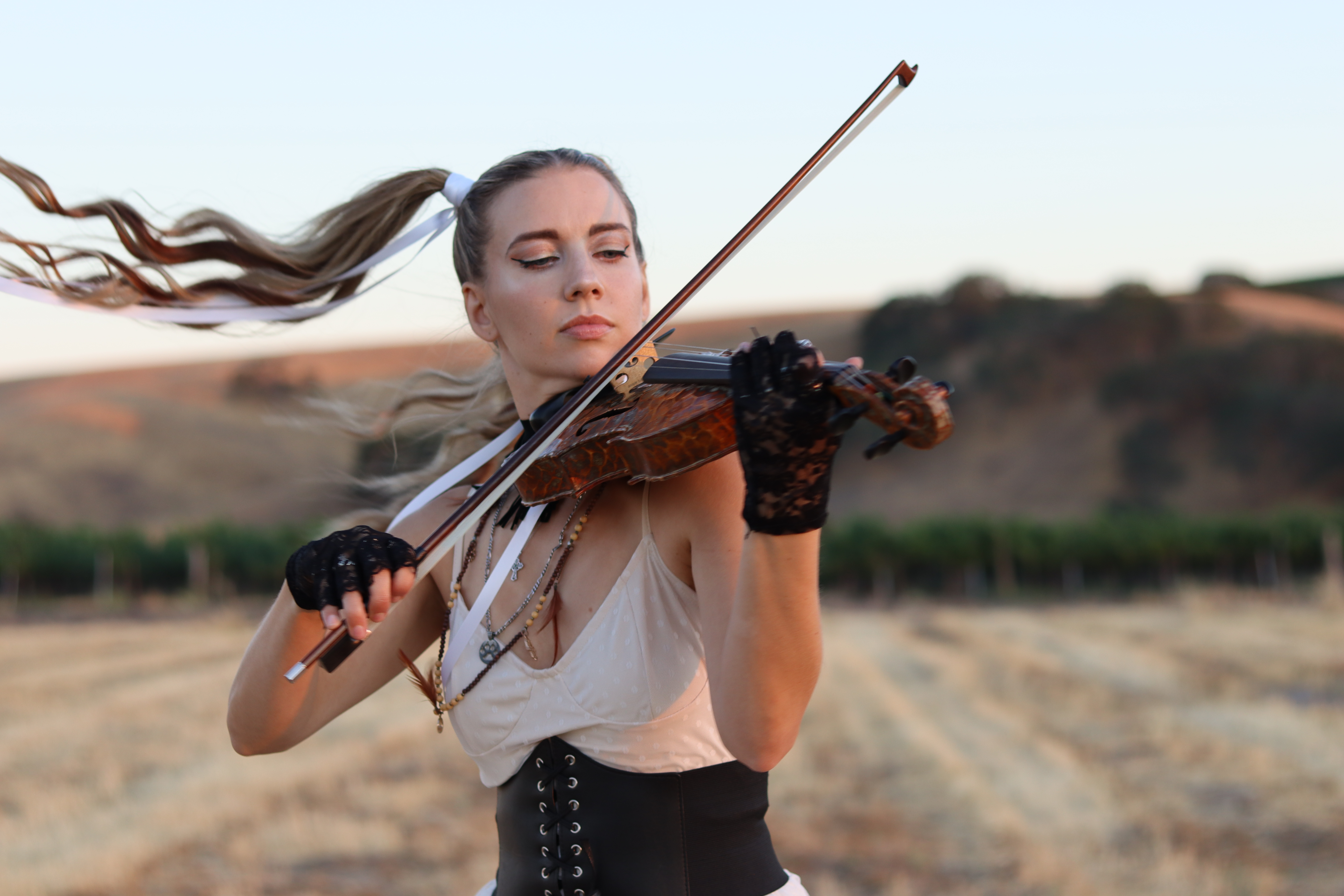
Michelle Lambert playing the Turtle Violin in 2021

=== Influences ===
Michelle grew up in a household with five older siblings, four of them studying the violin. Being the youngest child, she was exposed to all kinds of music, from classical music to punk rock. According to an interview for a radio station in the U.K., her biggest influences are Elvis Presley and Alison Krauss. When she was 12, Lambert traveled to Scotland with her sister Heidi Clare (who is a professional bluegrass violin player), to study violin at the Isle of Skye under Alasdair Fraser. She also visited the Western Hebrides region where she studied Celtic music. That is still a big influence in her work.

According to Lambert, Amy Winehouse, Ed Sheeran and Macklemore became very important influences in her solo career.

=== Fire breathing ===
While working in Nashville, Lambert learned and started to use fire breathing in her live performances.

=== Instruments ===
In July 2021, Lambert started using The Turtle Violin from Andrew Carruthers' Off Beat Collection in her live performances.

== Discography ==
=== Extended plays ===
Title	Album details
Warrior	Release date: June 12, 2015; Label: self-released; Formats: CD, music download and streaming
Angel	Release date: January 27, 2017; Label: self-released; Formats: CD, music download and streaming

=== Singles ===
Title	Album details
"My California"	Release date: December 7, 2017; Label: Western Sky Music; Formats: music download and streaming
"Girl on Fire"	Release date: February 1, 2020; Label: Self Released; Formats: music download and streaming
"Come to Me"	Release date: February 22, 2021; Label: Self Released; Formats: music download and streaming

=== Singles as featured artist ===
Title	Album details
"The Hunt" (Achraf Kallel featuring Michelle Lambert)	Release date: April 12, 2016; Label: Playectra Records; Formats: music download and streaming

=== Music videos ===
Year	Video	Director
2015	"Warrior"	Hunter Neiblum
2015	"Devil Went Down to Georgia"	Mark McIntosh
2020	"Girl on Fire"	Marco Ferreira
2021	"Come to Me"	Cedric Letsch
