= Johnny Rodgers (singer) =

American singer-songwriter

Johnny Rodgers (born John Daniel Rodgers on June 5, 1974) is an American singer-songwriter, pianist, Broadway star, and recording artist. The New York Times described him as an entertainer "[who] can't be found anywhere else" with "fused elements of Billy Joel, Peter Allen and Johnny Mercer."

== Background ==
Johnny Rodgers was born and grew up in Miami. Musical performance and stage productions were things he liked early in life. He attributes his grandmother's piano playing side by side with him as what started him down a music path as a youngster. Grandma Brown, who always wanted to be a Ziegfeld girl, picked out melodies on the piano for four-year-old Johnny to sing.

Beginning in 7th grade and then in high school, Rodgers took ballet, tap (his parents set up a piece of plywood on the grass so he could practice), and jazz dance lessons. He also learned to sing and finally found his way back to playing piano. His teacher, Mrs. Warren, assigned him Bach pieces to play. Rodgers performed songs like The Root Beer Rag by Billy Joel or an Elton John number. Every year Rodgers participated in musicals. Paula Wayne, who starred in Golden Boy (Lee Adams/Charles Strouse) with Sammy Davis Jr., was a valued mentor. While in a pre-college summer program at Carnegie Mellon, Rodgers wrote his first song, We May Be Young, But We're Not Blind. He still excels in singing love songs.

He attended the New World School of the Arts in Miami and started college with a scholarship to Florida State University's musical theater program. However, the program was on sabbatical, Rodgers felt the syllabus was redundant, and he was lonely. He went for a year at community college and then attended the jazz program at the University of Miami in Coral Gables, Florida. He eventually followed one of his instructors to and graduated from Western Michigan University.

== Career highlights ==
=== U.S. Department of State Tours ===
Johnny Rodgers tours as Ambassador of American Music around the world on behalf of the U.S. State Department included:

2010 - Southeast Asia and the Pacific Islands including Fiji, Papua New Guinea, Singapore, Cambodia, Malaysia, and Philippines

2011 - Middle East and North Africa. Performances and workshops in Bahrain, Jordan, United Arab Emirates, Djibouti, and Egypt

2012 - Malaysia, a special invitation from the Embassy to perform at the KK Kota Kinabalu Jazz Festival and other events

2013 - Russia. Performances and workshops in Tula, Kaluga, Tomsk, Moscow, Sochi and Yaroslavl

2014 - Russia. St. Petersburg and Moscow for The Triumph of Jazz festival hosted by Igor Butman

2014 - Malaysia. US Embassy and the US Department of State's American Music Abroad tour in Malaysia. (with special guest Michelle Lambert)

=== Liza Minnelli tours ===
Liza Minnelli met Rodgers while he was entertaining at lyricist Fred Ebb's Christmas party in 2002. She recognized Johnny's talent taking him on her world tours as her pianist and then as featured singer, dancer, pianist, and songwriter in the Tony Award-winning Liza's at The Palace...!, which played on Broadway in 2009/2010 and now shows on PBS television. Johnny co-wrote the featured song "I Would Never Leave You" and is included on the show's DVD release as well as the Grammy-nominated CD.

=== Johnny Rodgers Band ===
The Johnny Rodgers Band came together in New York City in 2003 and its mission is to bring musical depth to new, original songs. They are masters of an array of styles ranging from pop to jazz to classic rock. Music from the Johnny Rodgers Band provides a guided tour of Americana pop, from the piano-driven energy of rock and roll, to the supreme sophistication of jazz. The ensemble cultivates connections with audiences through performances, discussions, demonstrations, and exchange. The Johnny Rodgers Band has performed and recorded with artists including Liza Minnelli, Michael Feinstein, Randy Brecker, and Tom Harrell among others. Besides their own award winning recordings, the ensemble was featured on recordings which celebrate Maury Yeston and Jule Styne. The American Society of Composers, Authors and Publishers (ASCAP) selected The Johnny Rodgers Band to interpret and perform the music of Billy Joel in a command performance for the "Piano Man" himself in The Allen Room at Frederick P. Rose Hall, home of Jazz at Lincoln Center. They have been selected as Music Ambassadors for the U.S. Department of State and Jazz at Lincoln Center's Rhythm Road international music tour and other cultural exchange programs.

Featuring: Johnny Rodgers – piano/vocals

Brian Glassman – bass

Danny Mallon – drums

Joe Ravo – guitar

=== Musical theater projects ===
Motherhood: The Musical. Musical director, orchestrator, and arranger for this successful touring off-Broadway production which debuted in 2010. He produced the original cast album and is a co-writer on five of the musical's songs.

Liberace The Musical. Composer and lyricist with rights holder Barbara Carole Sickmen. Rodgers' work started in 2011 on the new Broadway project about the life of Liberace.

Firecracker Jack. Part of the musical was workshopped with ASCAP in New York City in 2010. This original work co-written with Nathan Crone is not yet completed but is an original musical with baseball prowess at the center of the story.

== Discography ==
=== Johnny Rodgers/Johnny Rodgers Band ===
Legends Of American Music, Volume 1 - Melody Thread 2012 - produced by the Johnny Rodgers Band

Let's Make A Date - Melody Thread 2008 - produced by Richard Barone

Bound Together - Melody Thread 2008 - produced by Barone

Box of Photographs - PS Classics 2005 - produced by Barone

=== Vocal performances / co-written songs ===
Liza's At The Palace "I Would Never Leave You" - Hybrid Recordings 2008

Liza's At The Palace "ACT II" - Hybrid Recordings 2008

Hallways: the Songs of Carol Hall "Change In Me" - LML Music 2008

Sweethearts: Multi-Artist Pop Hits Vol 1 "Special Light" - Oceanlight Records 2008

Jule Styne in Hollywood "Brooklyn Bridge"- PS Classics 2006

3 Men and a Baby...Grand, Salute the Rat Pack - LML Music 2006

Little Kisses, co-written & performs - Jolie Jones Music 2006

Maury Yeston Song Book "Danglin" - PS Classics 2003

=== Johnny Rodgers Band / Johnny Rodgers, producer ===
In Good Company - Lee Lessack LML Music 2005

Waiting for the Glaciers to Melt - Brian Lane Green LML Music 2005

=== Johnny Rodgers, producer / arranger / orchestrator / music supervisor / songwriter ===
Motherhood the Musical - Cast Recording, Sue Fabisch Mommy Music 2011

== Awards and nominations ==
- Runner up 2011 - Song of the Year, "Lord Let The Angels Sing"
- Winner 2011 - Bistro Award - Johnny Rodgers Band, Outstanding Musical Group
- Nominated 2011 - Carbonell Musical Theatre Award - Musical Direction "Motherhood the Musical"
- Winner 2010 - Great American Song Contest, "One More Moment"
- Winner 2010 - Nightlife Award, Outstanding Jazz Vocalist
- Selected 2010 - Rhythm Road Music Ambassador by US Dept of State & Jazz at Lincoln Center
- Winner 2009 - United Kingdom Song Contest Winner "The Best Of You In Me"
- Winner 2009 - Unisong International Song Contest for Performance "Bound Together"
- Winner 2008 - ASCAP Foundation Song Writer Award
- Winner 2008 - 15th Annual Billboard World Song Contest - Americana/Folk category "Home to Mendocino"
- Winner 2008 - Fans voted "Midday Moon" #1 Jazz song on OurStage.com in Jazz channel
- Winner 2008 - Fans voted "The Best Of You In Me" #1 on OurStage.com in John Lennon Song Contest channel
- Selected 2008 - Armed Forces Entertainment
- Winner – Songwriter's Hall of Fame – Abe Oldman Award 2002 (Is It The Way?)
- Winner – BackStage Bistro Award – Outstanding New York Début 2002
- Winner – Best One Man Show – Show Business Weekly
- Winner – MAC Award – Best Male New York Début 2002
