= Woodstock 99: Peace, Love, and Rage =

2021 documentary film

- Poster
- Directed by: Garret Price
- Starring: Moby; Jewel
- Narrated by: Bryan Vadnais
- Music by: Sindri Már Sigfússon; Noel Hogan
- Country of origin: United States
- Original language: English

Production
- Producers: Adam Gibbs; Sean Keegan
- Cinematography: Andre Lascaris; Luke Korver
- Editors: Garret Price; Avner Shiloah
- Running time: 110 minutes
- Production companies: HBO Documentary Films; Polygram Entertainment; Ringer Films

Original release
- Network: HBO; HBO Max
- Release: July 23, 2021

Woodstock 99: Peace, Love, and Rage (or Music Box: Woodstock 99) is a 2021 documentary film about the music festival Woodstock '99.

== Summary ==
The film features interviews in which the concert promoters, workers, performers, and attendees share their experiences of the infamous 3-day festival that was marred by intense heat, overpricing, violence, sexual assault, looting, vandalism and fires.

== Cast ==
- Michael Lang
- Joseph Griffo
- Dave Holmes
- Jewel
- Dave Mustaine
- Jonathan Davis
- Moby
- Tariq Trotter
- Dexter Holland
- Scott Stapp

== Production ==
Director Garret Price said in a 2021 interview that he thought the late 1990s had a "toxic" culture. Price reflected that when the festival took place, he and his college roommates "were glued to the pay-per-view that whole weekend", adding "It’s weird, though, as all that chaos unfolded in real time, it never felt crazy to me back then — it was almost like this extreme FOMO, wishing I was there. It wasn’t until years later when I started going down a YouTube rabbit hole of reliving the performances and reading articles that I started to understand all the issues that started to unfold that weekend. Not just of the festival itself, but of America culturally." Price also remarked, "I think the reason the '90s are so in right now is that people are nostalgic for the decade they were born in. So kids at Woodstock '99 were nostalgic for the mid-late '70s, with Dazed and Confused being popular. But Woodstock ’99 tried to push a nostalgia for the last '60s, and the ideals of counterculture and free love."

It was the first film of the six-part documentary series Music Box.

== Release ==
Woodstock 99: Peace, Love, and Rage premiered on July 23, 2021 (the 22nd anniversary of the concert's first day), on HBO and HBO Max.

== Reception ==
On the review aggregator website Rotten Tomatoes, 91% of 32 critics' reviews are positive, with an average rating of 7.4/10. The critics consensus reads, "Woodstock 99 documents the notorious music festival like an unraveling horror film to visceral effect, presenting a flashpoint in cultural nadir while suggesting that it was also a sign of troubles to come."

== See also ==
- Trainwreck: Woodstock '99, another documentary about Woodstock '99
- Baby boomers
- Generation X
- Nu metal
- Progressive rap
- Grunge
- Coachella
