= Trainwreck: The Real Project X =

2025 American documentary film by Alex Wood

- Film poster
- Directed by: Alex Wood
- Produced by: Tulasi Das
- Starring: Merthe Weusthuis
- Cinematography: Jean Louis Schuller
- Distributed by: Netflix
- Release date: July 8, 2025
- Running time: 48 minutes
- Country: Netherlands
- Languages: English; Dutch

Trainwreck: The Real Project X is a 2025 American documentary film directed by Alex Wood. It premiered on Netflix on July 8, 2025, as part of the Trainwreck series.

== Synopsis ==
The film documents the real-life events behind a 2012 teenage party in the Dutch village of Haren that spiraled into chaos after going viral on social media. The incident, often called the "real Project X", inspired international headlines for the mass attendee turnout, property damage, and police clashing with attendees following an accidental public birthday invitation on Facebook.

The series interviews residents, police, and partygoers, including Merthe Weusthuis, whose birthday invitation sparked the event. By August 2025, the documentary received 7.4 million views.

== Cast ==
- Merthe Weusthuis
- Iloe Degen
- Fenna Degen
- Laurens
- Jorik Clarck
- Chris Garrit
- Arnold
- Mariska Sloot
- Giel de Winter
- Thomas van der Vlugt
- Gilbert Sewnandan
- Arnoud Bodde
- Thomas

=== Archival footage ===
- Rob Bats
- Paul Heidanus
