= Kimbra Lo =

Asian-American eco-feminist artist

Kimbra Audrey Lo (born 1991) is an Asian-American eco-feminist artist, self-described activist and former fashion model.

== Early life ==
Lo began modeling as a teenager, working in fashion and commercial agencies. She moved to New York City at the age of 17 to pursue a modeling career. While working in the fashion industry, she struggled with the pressures of body image and the demand to conform to strict standards. Lo later spoke publicly about experiencing depression, which contributed to her decision to leave commercial fashion modeling.

== Lawsuit ==
In March 2011, Lo filed a sexual harassment lawsuit in Los Angeles Superior Court against Dov Charney, the then chief executive of American Apparel that was settled out of court.

== Later work ==
In 2022, Lo was diagnosed with breast cancer at age 30. Since then, her work has been focused on documenting her experiences of treatment and recovery, focusing on themes of illness, resilience, and womanhood.
