= John Scher =

American concert promoter

John Scher is an American concert promoter. He was one of the organizers of Woodstock '99.

Scher won the 2009 Tony Award for Best Special Theatrical Event for his work producing Liza's at the Palace.

== Business litigation ==
In 2013, Scher and Metropolitan Talent sued CMJ over a failed acquisition agreement. In March 2014, the New York Supreme Court dismissed some claims with leave to replead, while allowing their fraudulent-conveyance claim to proceed.

In August 2018, venue operator SMG sued Scher and Metropolitan Entertainment Consultants over a canceled James Taylor and John Legend concert at Albany's Times Union Center, alleging breach of contract and fraud. In March 2021, the court dismissed Scher from the case and dismissed the fraud-related claims. It found that Metropolitan had breached the license agreement, leaving causation and damages for trial.
