= Chris Butler (private investigator) =

American private investigator (born 1961)

- Born: Christopher Butler; 1961 (age 64–65)
- Occupations: Private investigator Former police officer
- Known for: Numerous convictions

Christopher Butler (born 1961) is a former private investigator and former Antioch, California, police officer, who founded a firm named Private Investigations, Inc., based in Concord, California.

Butler was arrested in February 2011 in relation to a conspiracy to sell drugs confiscated by police as evidence in other investigations. In September 2012, he was sentenced to eight years in prison on charges of robbery, extortion, and conspiracy.

== Media coverage ==
Butler's organization was featured in the media. Using these media appearances as marketing and with the help of a Beverly Hills public relations company, Butler signed a contract to be part of a reality television show on Lifetime Television, under the name P.I. Moms, referring to his use of women investigators.

On 24 August 2010, prior to the filming of the reality show, Peter Crooks received a call from a publicist in Los Angeles, representing Butler. Later, Butler was contacted by a local luxury lifestyle magazine, Diablo in an effort to appeal to the demographic that the magazine served. As admitted by several participants in the actions, Butler re-enacted a case to satisfy the "ride along" demand of the magazine's reporter, Peter Crooks. The re-enactment was executed on September 11, 2010, including a convoluted journey into the Napa Valley wine country tailing a suspected cheating fiancé and his mistress. The "PIs" involved were also all in on the ruse. Crooks was easily fooled; he was convinced that his experience was real and went on to write the story. Calling himself "Ronald Rutherford", Butler’s Director of Operations Carl Marino, an ex-cop Butler had hired from a Craigslist ad, told Crooks that the entire case had been a re-enactment. In several subsequent emails from "Rutherford", Marino laid out evidence to show Crooks that he was trustworthy and that the information was valid. Marino told Crooks that he was informing him as a favor so that the magazine could avoid embarrassment. After Crooks received the e-mail from Marino, he immediately contacted Butler and the "PI Moms" who had been on the ride along to question them about it. In 2025, Netflix aired a documentary called Trainwreck: P.I. Moms which revisits the creation of the reality show as part of its Trainwreck series.

== P.I. Moms (Lifetime Television) in popular media ==
- Soccer Moms Confidential (TV, 2012), 48 Hours (TV program)
- Trainwreck: P.I. Moms - Trainwreck (film series)
- "447: The Incredible Case of the P.I. Moms". This American Life. 23 September 2011. Transcript

== Arrest ==
Butler was arrested on February 16, 2011, along with Norman Wielsch, Commander of the Central Contra Costa County Narcotics Enforcement Team and a Special Agent Supervisor of the California Department of Justice. The two men were accused of selling police-confiscated crystal methamphetamine, anabolic steroids, and marijuana. These items had been seized as evidence in unrelated investigations and arrests. The materials had been stolen from police evidence lockers. Both men were indicted on 28 felony counts.

The counts include embezzlement, second-degree burglary, and conspiracy, as well as the drug-related charges. Butler's bail was set at $840,000, and Wielsch's was set at $660,000. Upon arrest, both were held in the Contra Costa county jail, located in Martinez, California. On February 8, 2012, the Contra Costa County District Attorney's Office dropped all state charges against Butler, while a case against him continued at the federal level. In May 2012, Butler pleaded guilty to robbery, extortion, and conspiracy, and in September 2012, he was sentenced to eight years in prison. Wielsch, the active duty senior officer and inside man in the crimes, pleaded guilty in December 2012 to five counts and was sentenced to 14 years in prison.

== Dirty DUIs ==
As recorded in published transcripts of his interviews with police detectives on March 17, 2011, Butler admitted that he hired female decoys to assist in determining if a "target" male, usually the husband of his female client, would drink alcohol in a quantity sufficient to exceed the legal limit to drive an automobile. Once the "target" male had been observed to consume this amount of alcohol, likely to exceed the legal limit to drive, the hired female decoys would leave the establishment and ask the target to follow them home.

An associate coined the phrase "dirty DUI scheme" to describe the practice. A number of the arrests and convictions resulting from the practice have been expunged and overturned, along with apologies from the senior deputy district attorney of Contra Costa County, Hal Jewett, whose office prosecuted the original cases. Jewett was quoted in his cover letter to one man arrested in a Butler "sting" operation as saying the drunken driving arrest was "one of the most deplorable legal practices I have ever heard of."
