= Project X Haren =

2012 riots in Groningen, Netherlands

- Part of the Project X phenomenon
- One of the promotional flyers for the event
- Date: 21 September 2012
- Location: Haren, Groningen, Netherlands
- Caused by: Social media-influenced snowball effect
- Methods: Rioting, civil disobedience, police violence

Parties
Party-goers	Netherlands: Ministry of the Interior and Kingdom Relations; National Police Corps

Lead figures
Non-centralized leadership	Beatrix (Monarch of the Netherlands); Mark Rutte (Prime Minister of the Netherlands); Liesbeth Spies (Minister of the Ministry of the Interior and Kingdom Relations); Max van den Berg (Queen's Commissioner of Groningen); Rob Bats (Mayor of Haren); Peter Rehwinkel (Mayor of Groningen); John Jorritsma (Queen's Commissioner of Friesland); Jacques Tichelaar (Queen's Commissioner of Drenthe)

Casualties and losses
21 wounded, 15 arrests	15 wounded

Project X Haren was an event that started out as a public invitation to a birthday party by a girl on Facebook, but ended up as a gathering of tens of thousands of youths causing riots on 21 September 2012 in the town of Haren, Groningen, Netherlands.

The event was unprecedented in the Netherlands, but in June 2011, a German girl had posted similar birthday invitations on the internet. Hundreds of mostly drunk youths gathered in Hamburg, Germany, causing a great deal of damage and rioting against the police.

In 2025, the events inspired a Netflix documentary called Trainwreck: The Real Project X.

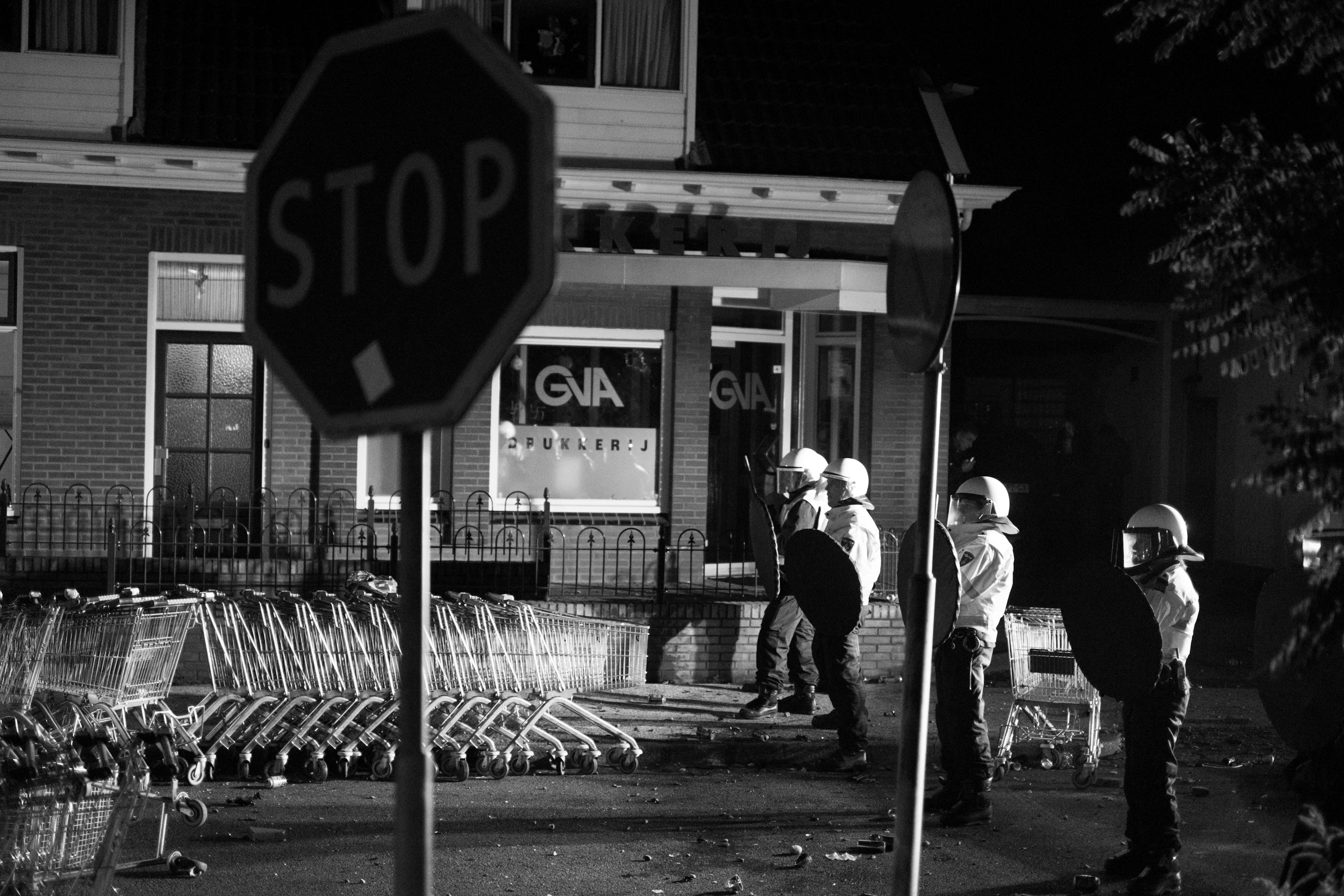
Riot control in Haren during a Project X inspired party in 2012.

== Background ==
On September 7, 2012, Merthe, a 15-year-old girl from Haren sent 78 friends a public invitation to her 16th birthday via the social network site Facebook. She deliberately chose the option 'public' so that her friends could bring other friends. This way, the girl hoped to obtain a head count. One of her friends' friends misused the invitation and invited 500 people himself. This triggered a snowball effect where thousands of people were added to that number in a matter of days. In just two days, 16,000 people were invited. The girl then deleted the event after consulting her parents. However, others took command by creating copycat versions of the event, and quickly Twitter and Facebook were filled with terms like Project X Merthe, Project X Stationsweg (the street where she lived), and Project X Haren. Project X is a reference to the 2012 film of the same name, directed by Nima Nourizadeh.

Project X Haren was run by a 21-year-old man from Christchurch, New Zealand, and an unknown individual from Berlin calling himself "Ibe Der Fuhrer". The 21-year-old claims he accepted the request from a Dutch person to host the Facebook event. The father of the birthday girl asked the two men to cancel the event, but they did not comply.

After the invitation, Facebook, Twitter, YouTube, and other weblogs and internet forums were quickly filled with conversations regarding Project X. Within a week, 24,000 people were invited and 2,400 had accepted. On 14 September, the girl's parents distributed a letter in their neighborhood to warn residents of their rising concerns. This letter quickly appeared on the internet.

On 18 September, the municipality of Haren and the local police force agreed to act strongly if the party escalated. By then, the rumours had spread to the national media. 55,000 people had been invited, and 6,000 of them accepted. Local entrepreneurs took advantage of the situation and organised afterparties in Groningen. Between 19 and 21 September, the expected attendance grew from 8,000 to 30,000. On the 21st alone, around 400,000 tweets were sent regarding Project X Haren.

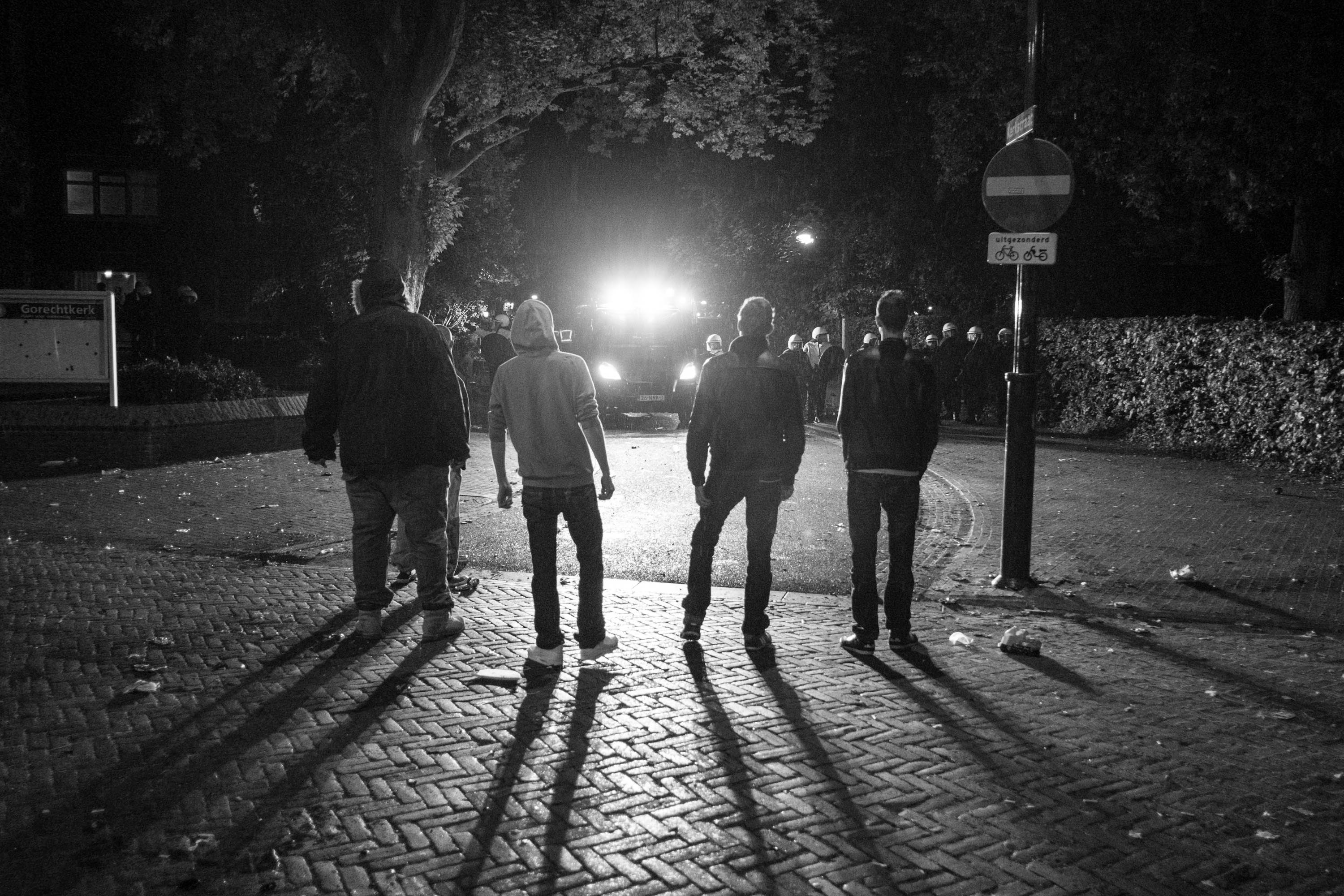
Rioters facing the riot police

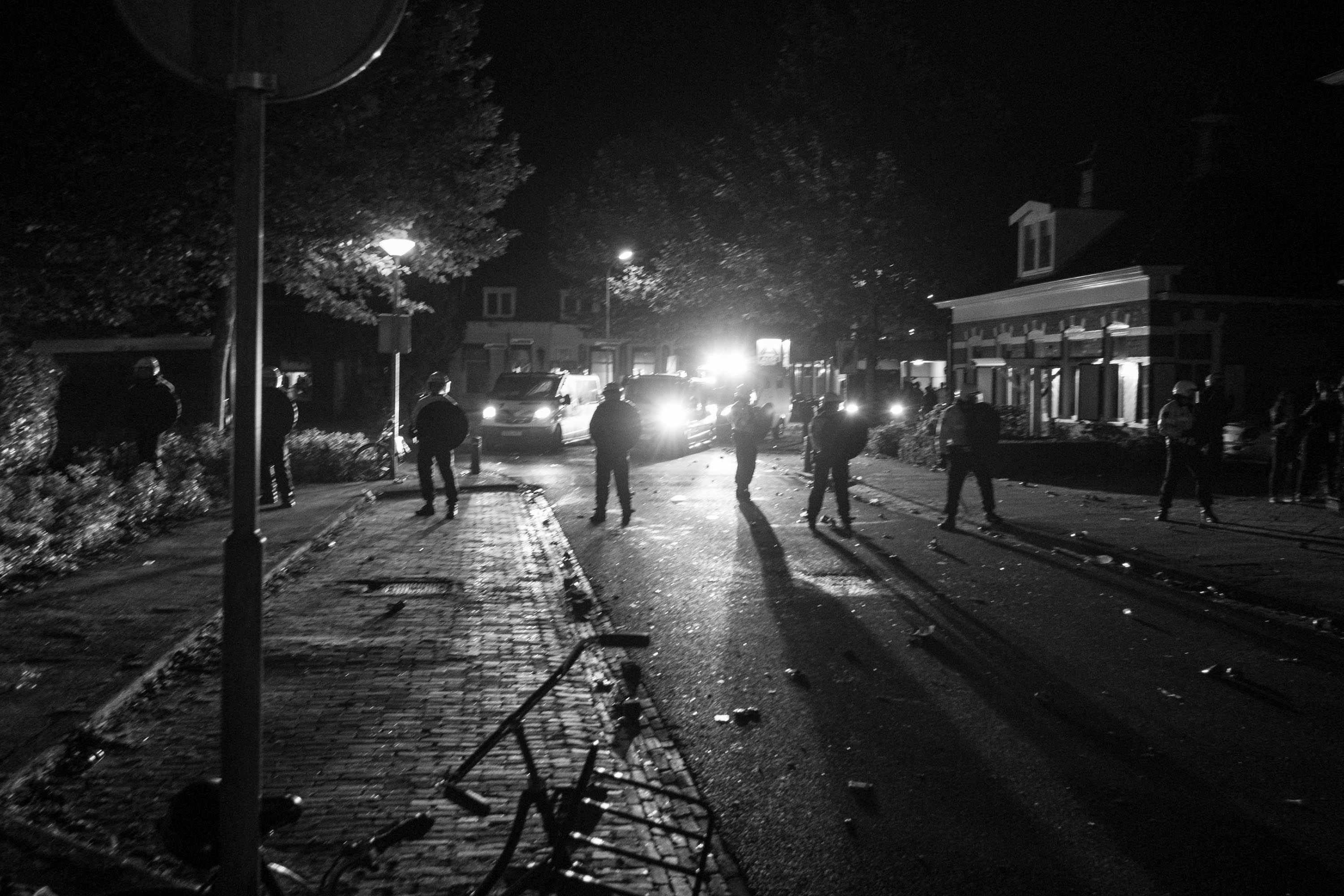
Riot control walking along the debris-filled streets

Due to the overwhelming number of people gathering on the street, Merthe and her family felt unsafe and left for Merthe's aunt's house, the location of which was not disclosed to the public. The neighborhood was subsequently closed off on 21 September. Rob Bats, mayor of Haren at the time, and the municipal council decided not to organise a party to accommodate the visitors and called on people not to come to Haren. A nearby football field was designed as a shelter in case of attendance overload and the local police conversed with German police because an equivalent Project X event had earlier taken place there.

== Events ==
In the morning and afternoon, a few hundred people had traveled to Haren, but the number of visitors appeared to be diminishing towards the beginning of the evening. However, around 7:30 p.m. thousands of youths poured in, and around 9:00 p.m. the riots started. It has been suggested by Job Cohen and several columnists that the presence of journalists in the village reporting on the lack of people present and the lack of 'something happening' triggered the riots in the evening. Rioters from all around the country commenced destroying cars, bicycles, windows, and street furniture. According to the police, the destruction of property was extremely violent and well-planned, and the rioters deliberately sought confrontation.

At 9:30 riot control was commissioned to control the crowd. At 11:00 backup police officers arrived from the provinces Friesland and Drenthe. 36 rioters and 15 policemen were injured. Nearby hospitals reported cuts, head injuries, and bruises. An elderly man was assaulted in his home and was badly injured. In total, 500 policemen were commissioned, of which 250 were riot control.

Buses were sent to get people out of Haren and move them to Groningen. 12 of the 24 buses were damaged by bystanders.

== Aftermath ==
=== Project Clean X ===
After the riots, Facebook was used to gather people on 22 September to help clean up Haren.

=== Accusations and arrests ===
- On 21 September, 34 rioters were arrested. On 22 September, two teenagers gave themselves up guided by their parents. According to the Public Prosecutor, most rioters were 18 or 19 years old, but 11 suspects were underaged.
- One person was released on 22 September, but was still a suspect. 25 of the 35 remaining arrested rioters were released on 24 September with a summons. Six individuals accused of serious criminal offences were summoned on 25 September. One of them was released. All 35 suspects were sentenced in October 2012.
- In October 2012, hundreds of new leads were sent to the police and 50 reports of destruction were made. This led to another 19 arrests.
- Two journalists reporting from Haren for local television networks RTV Noord and RTV Drenthe made a statement to the police that they were hit by riot control, while they were clearly doing their job.
- On 30 October 2012 the police showed recognisable photographs of a dozen rioters in a national television program. Seven of them were quickly identified.
- On 25 July 2013 12 rioters were sentenced to imprisonment and community services. They also had to make a financial contribution to a fund for compensation for harmed citizens of Haren.

=== Other Project X parties ===
After Project X Haren various other Project X invitations were sent out for, among others, Gouda, Alkmaar and Amersfoort. On 22 September 2012, a group of youths were arrested in Schiedam for instigation after having gathered for a Project X party. The municipality of Arnhem closed off all entrances to the city after an announcement regarding a Project X party, but everything remained calm. In Uden, a 15-year-old boy was arrested for announcing a Project X party on Twitter.

=== Investigations ===
Shortly after the events in Haren, investigations were announced. These would be led by a commission composed of:

- Chairman: Job Cohen, former leader of the Labour Party, Dutch: Partij van de Arbeid (abbr. PvdA), and former mayor of Amsterdam;
- Gabriël van den Brink, professor in public administration at Tilburg University;
- Otto Adang, professor Openbare orde en Gevaarbeheersing at the Dutch police academy.
- Jan van Dijk, professor in communication sciences and new media at Twente University;
- Thomas Boeschoten, student of new media at Utrecht University

The evaluation had several goals. First of all, the commission set out to account the government for its relation to the events. Also was tried to gain a clearer insight in this phenomenon to prevent future escalating violence. The principal investigator was the municipality Haren, but the investigations were also monitored on a national level.

On 8 March 2013, the commission announced its results:

- The visitors in Haren were mainly youths.
- Hooligans did not play an important role.
- Alcohol was the main cause of the arising of the riots.
- The government had no control over the events from the start and did not have a clear strategy, causing policemen to be unsure of their tasks.
- Mayor Rob Bats exerted his power too little and waited far too long before calling in extra help.

As a result of the published report as well as public pressure, Rob Bats resigned as mayor on 1 April 2013.

== In popular culture ==
In 2025, Netflix released a documentary titled Trainwreck: The Real Project X, recounting the event.
