= Trainwreck: Mayor of Mayhem =

2025 American documentary film by Shianne Brown

- Promotional poster
- Directed by: Shianne Brown
- Produced by: Oscar Gregg
- Starring: Rob Ford
- Cinematography: Jean-Louis Schuller
- Edited by: Bjorn Johnson; Napoleon Stratogiannakis
- Music by: Mat Davidson
- Distributed by: Netflix
- Release date: June 10, 2025
- Running time: 49 minutes
- Country: United States
- Language: English

Trainwreck: Mayor of Mayhem is a 2025 American documentary film directed by Shianne Brown. It premiered on Netflix on June 10, 2025, as part of the Trainwreck series.

== Synopsis ==
The film chronicles the rise and fall of former Toronto mayor Rob Ford, whose populist appeal collided with scandal after a viral video showed his erratic behavior in office while using drugs. Through interviews and archival footage, the documentary explores how Ford's chaotic tenure turned into an international media spectacle.

== Cast ==
- Katie Simpson
- Dave Rider
- Tom Beyer
- John Filion
- Mark Towhey
- Josh Matlow
- Robyn Doolittle
- Jerry Agyemang

=== Archival footage ===
- Rob Ford
- Doug Ford
- Renata Ford
- Doug Ford Sr.
- Hulk Hogan
- David Miller
- Mike Tyson

== Production ==
Shianne Brown asked Rob's brother, Doug Ford, to participate in the film, but he declined.

== Reception ==
On the review aggregator website Rotten Tomatoes, 67% of six critics' reviews are positive.

Rebecca Nicholson of The Guardian gave the film three out of five stars and wrote that it's "jaw-dropping, and provocative, and a reminder of how certain parts of the western world got to where we are."
