= Trainwreck: The Astroworld Tragedy =

2025 American documentary film by Yemi Bamiro

- Promotional poster
- Directed by: Yemi Bamiro; Hannah Poulter
- Cinematography: Jean-Louis Schuller
- Edited by: Jesse Dixon
- Music by: Nick Foster
- Distributed by: Netflix
- Release date: June 10, 2025
- Running time: 80 minutes
- Country: United States
- Language: English

Trainwreck: The Astroworld Tragedy is a 2025 American documentary film directed by Yemi Bamiro and Hannah Poulter. Centered around the Astroworld Festival crowd crush, it premiered on Netflix on June 10, 2025, as part of the Trainwreck film series.

== Synopsis ==
The film investigates the deadly crowd surge at Travis Scott’s 2021 Astroworld Festival in Houston, where 10 people died and hundreds were injured.

Through survivor accounts, emergency recordings, and expert commentary, the documentary examines the failures in crowd control and event planning that led to the disaster.
