= Woodstock '99 =

1999 music festival in Rome, New York, U.S.

Woodstock 1999
- Genre: Hard rock; post-grunge; nu metal; rap rock; alternative rock; rap metal; thrash metal; heavy metal; hip-hop
- Dates: July 22–25, 1999
- Locations: Griffiss Air Force Base (Rome, New York, U.S.)
- Coordinates: 43.23°N 75.41°W
- Founders: Michael Lang, John Scher
- Attendance: 220,000–400,000 (estimated)
- Website: woodstock1999.com

Location in the United States
Location in New York

Woodstock 1999 (also known as Woodstock '99) was a music festival held from July 22 to July 25, 1999, in Rome, New York, United States. After Woodstock '94, it was the second large-scale music festival that attempted to emulate the original 1969 Woodstock festival. Like the previous festivals, it was held in upstate New York; the festival site was the former Griffiss Air Force Base in Rome, roughly 100 miles (160 km) northwest of the 1969 Woodstock site in Bethel. Approximately 220,000 people attended the festival over the 3 days.

MTV covered the festival extensively, and live coverage was available on pay-per-view. Westwood One held its radio rights. Excerpts were released on CD and DVD. In Canada, the event was covered by Much; their coverage included interviews with artists and attendees, but not the musical performances.

The festival was marred by sexual harassment and rapes, difficult environmental conditions, overpriced food and water, poor sanitation, rioting, looting, vandalism, arson, violence, and three deaths, leading to media attention and controversy that vastly overshadowed coverage of the musical performances. It has been described as "a flashpoint in cultural nadir", "like a concentration camp", like being "in another country during military conflict", and like "a scene where zombies are coming over the castle walls", with the morning after likened to the Bosnian War.

== Organization ==
Michael Lang, one of the organizers of the original Woodstock festival and Woodstock '94, agreed to partner with New Jersey concert promoter John Scher for a thirtieth anniversary festival. A third Woodstock festival was considered a risky proposition after a rain squall at Woodstock '94 (later sardonically dubbed "Mudstock") led gatecrashers to breach fences and attendees to throw mud at each other and the performers, leading to a large financial loss and negative press coverage. Lang and Scher began organizing plans for the festival in the fall of 1998. They originally planned to file applications to have the festival at the Winston Farm site where Woodstock '94 was held. Scher quickly began scouting for multiple high-profile acts of the time to draw media and popular attention. Rome mayor Joseph Griffo received Lang's proposal for the festival and approved it in an effort to revitalize the area and attract funding, holding a press conference with Hillary Clinton to announce the festival once the venue was secured.

Organizers had planned to hold a European leg of the festival in Wiener Neustadt, Austria, on the weekend prior to the festival in Rome. This was ultimately cancelled; Lang stated that more time than available was required in order to be able to hold a safe event.

== Performers ==
Many of the high-profile acts such as the Red Hot Chili Peppers, Metallica, Fatboy Slim, The Offspring, DMX, Limp Bizkit, Korn, Alanis Morissette, Bush, Kid Rock, Rage Against The Machine and Creed were popular or rising artists of the era. While no acts that performed at the original Woodstock festival took the stage at Woodstock 1999, two individuals did; John Entwistle of the Who performed a solo set and Mickey Hart of the Grateful Dead played with his band Planet Drum. Jeff Beck was scheduled to perform but had to cancel due to a "scheduling conflict". He had been scheduled to perform at the original Woodstock festival; however, his band the Jeff Beck Group broke up the previous week. Although the Doors had rejected an offer to play at the first Woodstock, their guitarist Robby Krieger was a surprise addition to Creed's set, performing the Doors' "Roadhouse Blues" with the group. Only five acts on the bill (Collective Soul, Live, Metallica, Sheryl Crow, and the Red Hot Chili Peppers) had performed at Woodstock '94. Korn frontman Jonathan Davis recalled that management group the Firm, Inc. rented a Boeing 737 for his band, Limp Bizkit, and Ice Cube to fly all three artists from Southern California to Syracuse for the festival.

=== Booking conflicts ===
Marilyn Manson and Hole were initially reported to be on the bill but both later withdrew. Manson stated he refused the bill due to his band not being offered a prime time slot. Hole were unable to perform due to conflicting tour dates in addition to personal tensions between Courtney Love and Dave Grohl.

Foo Fighters were initially set to perform, but they withdrew to finish work on the album There Is Nothing Left to Lose, and due to guitarist Franz Stahl not yet having been replaced by Chris Shifflett, who joined the band the following month.

Sugar Ray were slated to appear, but they were forced to cancel two days prior due to lead singer Mark McGrath being too sick to perform.

Al Green was also supposed to appear, flying from Nashville in a small private plane, but he backed out following John F. Kennedy Jr.'s death in a plane crash.

Several nu metal bands such as Slipknot, Rob Zombie, System of a Down, Powerman 5000, Static-X, and Deftones were each offered slots, but all were obligated to perform the final two remaining dates of that year's Ozzfest tour in California that weekend. Godsmack and Megadeth were the only two bands from that year’s Ozzfest lineup to accept the offer; both were flown overnight from San Bernardino to Rome for their set on July 25.

Various female performers rumored to perform had conflicting schedules with Lilith Fair. Numerous bands from the 1999 Warped Tour were also offered slots, but only Reveille and Sevendust accepted.

== Facilities ==
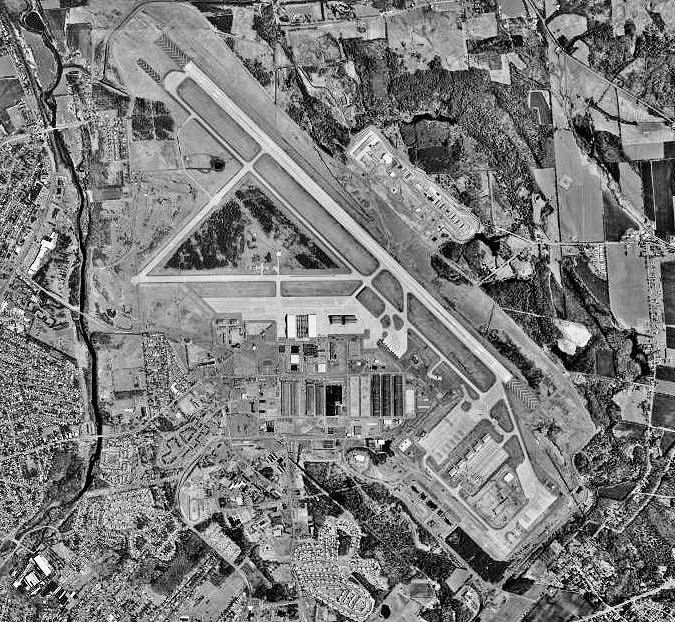
Aerial photo of Griffiss Air Force Base in 1997

The festival was held on the east side of Rome at the former Griffiss Air Force Base, a designated Superfund waste cleanup site. The U.S. Air Force had decommissioned and closed the B-52 base in September 1995, and the area was later redeveloped as Griffiss Business and Technology Park. During this time, the base was largely unused and in poor condition.

The promoters were determined to avoid the gate-crashing that had occurred at previous festivals. Lang and Scher characterized the site as "defensible", installing a 12-foot (3.7 m) wall of plywood and steel to prevent gate-crashing. Lang later dubbed this the “peace wall” as organizers invited numerous volunteers to paint on sections of the panels. In addition to the wall, approximately 500 New York State Police troopers were initially planned to provide security.

In addition to two main stages, facilities included several alternative stages, a night-time rave hangar, a sports park, and a film festival (sponsored by the Independent Film Channel) held in a former airplane hangar.

== Finances and promotion ==
Woodstock 1999 was conceived and executed as a commercial venture with dozens of corporate sponsors and included the presence of vendor "malls" and modern accoutrements such as ATMs and email stations. Scher hoped to avoid the large losses that Woodstock '94 had incurred, planning for the 1999 event to turn a profit; this resulted in numerous cost-cutting measures such as the extensive subcontracting of onsite amenities. Advance tickets for the event were priced at $150 (Equivalent to around $303 in 2026) plus service charges, at the time considered costly for a festival of this type. Tickets purchased at the gate cost $180 (Equivalent to around $364 in 2026).

There were about 400,000 attendees. A total of 186,983 tickets were sold according to reports shortly after the festival, "a gross take of $28,864,748" at the time. Ticket sales were advertised as being capped at 250,000, the capacity of the venue. It has been estimated that ticket sales were worth $60 million in revenue, but that number appears to have been based on believing there were 400,000 paid attendees. Ticket sales may have been underreported to avoid extra payouts to the city of Rome and Oneida County:

Perhaps the discrepancy stems from the deal between Woodstock 1999 promoters and the Griffiss Local Development Corporation (GLDC). MTV cites that the GLDC, the city of Rome, and Oneida County were expected to receive $1 million to host the festival and an additional $250,000 if ticket sales topped 200,000.

Any tickets sold beyond 200,000 would then result in an additional $5 (per ticket) paid to all parties. While it's clear more than 186,983 people attended Woodstock 1999, on paper, only that many tickets had been recorded being sold.

Based on that figure, the promoters wouldn't have been required to dish out the extra money it had promised the GLDC.

The promoters stated a figure of $38 million in original production costs, not including damages, fees, or emergency costs. Promoters had originally budgeted the festival at $30 million.

Rome itself became a draw for attendees, who patronized its bars, restaurants, and stores, and stayed in its hotels for the concert's duration. The Oneida County Convention and Visitors Bureau estimated that festival attendees spent as much as $40 million in Rome over the weekend.

Woodstock 1999 was simulcast on pay-per-view television, with early reports of 500,000 purchases. In addition to documenting the musical performances, MTV's pay-per-view coverage included coverage of the site and vox pop interviews with attendees, which some reporters later considered to resemble gonzo journalism. With 500,000 purchases of $59.95 simulcast passes, revenues were estimated at up to $30 million. Five years earlier, Woodstock '94 had made over $9 million on its pay-per-view sales to 220,000 households. Other revenue came from CD and DVD sales after the festival. "We knew we'd never make a significant on-site profit," Scher says. "It's all about the after-show marketing. We believe that we have a great event to build upon." Scher, Lang, and Griffo held press conferences on the morning of each day of the festival, as well as the morning of the day after, in which they repeatedly denied or minimized the poor conditions and violence of the festival.

=== Vendors ===
Vendors paid $500 (equivalent to $970 in 2025) to sell at Woodstock during the four-day festival. Many non-licensed vendors attempted to sell on a smaller scale on the paths to and from the concert and camping areas.

== Reception ==
The festival featured a diverse assortment of acts, early reviews for many of which were positive. The Associated Press deemed Korn, Limp Bizkit, Kid Rock, Insane Clown Posse and Rage Against the Machine the "breakout stars" of the festival. Performances by the Offspring, Dave Matthews Band, DMX, Sheryl Crow, and Jamiroquai also received praise. Critical and public attention, however, quickly turned to the poor on-site conditions and the increasingly uncontrolled behavior of the crowd.

=== Notable moments ===
- Kid Rock remarked on the Clinton–Lewinsky scandal: "Monica Lewinsky is a fucking ho, and Bill Clinton is a goddamn pimp!"
- Dave Matthews jokingly addressed the crowd after noticing a large number of topless women present, claiming, "there's an abundance of titties."
- During the Offspring's performance of the song "Pretty Fly (For a White Guy)", Israeli actor Guy Cohen, who had appeared in the song's music video, joined the band onstage for the performance.
- The Umbilical Brothers were booed off the west stage while they were performing.
- Korn lead singer Jonathan Davis claimed he was suffering severe heat exhaustion following his band's performance. He was briefly given an IV, covered with bags of ice, and put on oxygen after leaving the stage. He described performing the opening song of the set, "Blind", as like "witnessing an immense wave of sound traveling for miles down the runway" with the movements of the crowd.
- Ice Cube jokingly claimed he was going to end his set short, but returned to the stage after two minutes, performing fragments of "Straight Outta Compton" and "Fuck tha Police" by his former band N.W.A.
- Fred Durst began complaining to the sound technicians after the performance of Limp Bizkit's song "Break Stuff" as his microphone was cut whilst the main sound tower was being evacuated due to the ongoing vandalism. Numerous celebrities were present for Limp Bizkit's set, including Puff Daddy, Kid Rock, Joe C., Jennifer Aniston, Noodles, Jonathan Davis, Fieldy, Lars Ulrich, and Verne Troyer, who had introduced the band prior to their set, declaring "You want the worst? Well, you got the worst".
- Rage Against the Machine bassist Tim Commerford lit an American flag on fire during their performance of "Killing in the Name".
- Everlast utilized an extensive backing band for his set, and later performed "Jump Around" (his 1992 hit with House of Pain); this was his first concert performance of the song in nearly four years.
- During the Red Hot Chili Peppers' set, bassist Flea walked onstage naked, addressing the crowd by jumping up and down whilst exposing his genitalia.
- Megadeth frontman Dave Mustaine gave a brief tribute to former drummer Gar Samuelson, who had died earlier that month, prior to the band's performance of "Peace Sells".

== Problems ==
=== Environment ===
Temperatures in Rome on the weekend of the festival were in excess of 100 °F (38 °C). The former Griffiss AFB included large areas of concrete and asphalt with little or no shade, placing the entire facility within its own heat island; this not only caused temperatures to rise during the day, but also kept them elevated at night. The East and West stages were 2.3 miles (3.7 km) apart, forcing festivalgoers to walk a long distance across hot concrete surfaces. Camping space across the grassy areas quickly became scarce by the middle of the first day, forcing numerous attendees to camp on the hot asphalt surfaces. In an effort to find shade, concertgoers took refuge from the heat under tractor-trailers or tables. In a 2021 interview, Noodles of the Offspring sardonically criticized the facility for its unsuitability for the festival:

"You know there was a festival ground in Germany that was literally built by Hitler, and we've played there a buncha times, great venue, buncha fun. That airbase was less hospitable than a place built by Nazis."

=== Concessions ===
Numerous budget cuts were made during the hiring and delegation process for concession vendors; organizers were forced to lease services from numerous subcontractors, whose contracts gave them complete control of pricing. Concessions sold by onsite vendors were regularly marked up to inconvenient prices; bottled water was sold for $4.00 (equivalent to $7.73 in 2025). Supplies of food and water dwindled over the three days of the festival, which vendors took advantage of to raise prices; by the third day of the festival, booths charged up to $12.00 (equivalent to $23.19 in 2025) for water bottles. As an alternative, festival-goers faced a long walk or cramped travel via looping buses to Rome's modest shopping areas, where stores had long lines and low stock. Most outside food and drink was confiscated by security, though several concertgoers reported that security often overlooked or were bribed to ignore attendees bringing in various drugs. Attendees stood in long lines to access the free water fountains, until frustration led numerous concertgoers to break the pipes to provide water to those in the middle of the line. As a result, numerous mud pits began forming around the concert site. The groundwater and soil at the site had been contaminated by heavy metals and toxic chemicals such as trichloroethylene and PCBs from its time as a military installation, hence its designation as a Superfund clean-up site.

=== Sanitation ===
The number of portable toilets installed proved insufficient for the number of attendees. The toilets and showers soon became unusable and overflowing, and male guests resorted to urinating on the side of the toilets or behind vendor stalls. Sewage from the toilets flowed into the mud pits and camping areas, mixing with water from the broken pipes and creating an odor strong enough to be smelled five miles away. Many attendees began jumping into the mud pits and water troughs to stay cool in the intense heat, unaware of the contamination; this led to many cases of trench mouth and trench foot. The Oneida County Health Department analyzed a sample of the free drinking water, finding it to be contaminated with E. coli and other bacteria.

An insufficient number of trash cans were provided on the site, and concertgoers eventually began overturning the cans and drumming on them or rolling them across the field. Subcontracted sanitation workers often failed to appear for their duties, allowing trash to pile up throughout the site.

=== Security ===
The festival's lackluster security was another source of blame for violence and poor conditions on site. To further cut costs—and avoid "the influences of the government or of the police state," according to Lang—organizers did not hire conventional security officers, instead sourcing adolescents and young adults from a nearby job agency to serve as the "Peace Patrol." Nearly all of the Peace Patrol officers lacked any prior experience in security or law enforcement. All Peace Patrol officers were unarmed, and most seemed uninterested in performing their duties. Many security employees simply sold their spare security shirts to other concertgoers or abandoned their posts entirely; some Peace Patrol guards alleged that others had utilized their positions to demand sexual favors from women in the audience. Many of the officers reported unruly conduct from their peers within the first day of the festival, including the theft of personal items from employees and guests. Some security guards confiscated camping supplies from people entering the gates; some confiscated alcoholic beverages which they then drank themselves. Numerous attendees entered with fake passes, few of which security confiscated. A large number of attendees had also smuggled drugs or other illicit substances into the festival, which the Peace Patrol often ignored or allowed onto the grounds in exchange for a bribe.

=== Sexual assaults ===
Extensive substance abuse and poor security, along with a culture of misogyny, contributed to widespread abuse of female concertgoers throughout the festival. During the Offspring's performance, singer Dexter Holland condemned the crowd's behavior after witnessing numerous women being groped in the audience, as did Red Hot Chili Peppers bassist Flea and Jamiroquai singer Jay Kay during their sets. At least five rapes and numerous other sexual assaults and incidents of sexual harassment at the festival were officially reported, though it is widely believed that a far greater number of unreported incidents occurred. Eyewitnesses reported a crowd-surfing woman being pulled down into the crowd and assaulted in the mosh pit during Limp Bizkit's set. During the post-show rave on Saturday night, an apparently intoxicated man stole and drove a maintenance truck into the rave hangar through the crowd during Fatboy Slim's set, in which staff reported seeing a teenage girl being raped; Fatboy Slim and his entourage were asked to evacuate the premises immediately, and fled to a nearby airport and flying out the following morning. A volunteer also reported seeing a gang rape during Korn's performance.

== Timeline of incidents ==
=== Friday, July 23 ===
Unruly behavior from those in attendance at the festival was present as early as the second day. Numerous male concertgoers began chanting "show your tits" at actress Rosie Perez as she introduced DMX alongside actor Stephen Baldwin. Annoyed by their chanting, she retorted, "I ain't showing y'all shit!" DMX later performed the song "My Niggas" and had the crowd chant along with him; media outlets later reacted to this in confusion and outrage, as the overwhelmingly white audience chanted the word "nigga" along with him.

The "show your tits" chant returned during Sheryl Crow's set, with Crow responding, "You'd have to pay a whole lot more than you paid to get in to see my tits." Crow reported that one audience member had thrown feces at her during her performance of "My Favorite Mistake". She would later criticize the performance and the festival due to the behavior of the crowd, and stated that she had considered ending her set early out of disgust. She recalled the performance as the "single worst gig I have ever had" in 2019.

A fan threw a soda bottle at the Offspring singer Dexter Holland during the band's performance of "Have You Ever", but he continued performing unfazed. Toward the end, before their performance of "Self Esteem", Holland condemned sexual misconduct in the crowd after witnessing numerous women being groped and later said: "...if you're a girl and you have a guy passing over you, do me a favor and grab him by the balls."

Halfway in their set, the Offspring lined up five dummies with the faces of each member of the Backstreet Boys in front of their drum riser during a break in between songs. Holland then began hitting the dummies with a plastic baseball bat, and the crowd joined in by throwing water bottles at them. Some commentators have highlighted this incident as part of a pattern of sometimes violent rockist sentiment and machismo expressed by the festival's male performers and attendees, while others felt that it was hypocritical for MTV to promote the festival's heavier rock acts while featuring boy bands such as the Backstreet Boys on its television and radio programming.

To protest the exorbitant price of onsite concessions, Insane Clown Posse taped $100 bills to several beach balls and kicked them into the crowd during their performance. Members of the audience then fought over the money.

Korn's performance on Friday night considerably riled up the crowd. Bush frontman Gavin Rossdale had reportedly expressed anxiety about performing immediately after Korn due to fears that the crowd's energy could turn violent. This sentiment was shared by Korn's Jonathan Davis, who later admitted that his band's scheduling was mismatched with Bush's and felt he had inadvertently placed Rossdale in a dangerous position. Bush's performance ultimately proceeded without incident and marginally calmed the crowd.

=== Saturday, July 24 ===
During the Tragically Hip's performance opening the festival's second day, numerous fans anticipating Kid Rock's performance pelted the band with bottles. Attempting to divert attention from the bottles, frontman Gord Downie began humorously singing "O Canada" in appreciation for the large amount of Canadian fans present waving Canadian flags. Many other fans in the crowd then began booing the band and singing "The Star-Spangled Banner" in response.

Ryan Miller of Guster recalled performing in front of a hostile crowd displeased with the band's set. Drummer Brian Rosenworcel felt they were unfit for the lineup, as most in attendance were impatiently waiting for nu metal or hip-hop acts such as Limp Bizkit or Ice Cube: "There was this aggressive culture to both the artists that they chose and the audience that they drew, and that is not Guster's bread and butter. ... We were a melodic band and [the others were] Limp Bizkit and Korn and even like DMX [and] I was like, What did we get ourselves into?"

Alanis Morissette noted the apathy of the crowd during her set, as a large majority of fans in attendance were waiting for Limp Bizkit's performance; some began booing and chanting "Limp Bizkit" near the end of her set as they grew impatient.

Appalled by the prices of concessions, Kid Rock and Wyclef Jean asked the audience to throw their empty water bottles onstage in between songs.

==== Limp Bizkit ====
Violence and vandalism would considerably escalate during the evening's performance by Limp Bizkit. Concertgoers also began moshing violently, visibly destroying nearby structures, and crowd-surfing by utilizing the plywood barriers. Frontman Fred Durst addressed the crowd following the song "9 Teen 90 Nine" after being approached by festival staff: "They wanna ask us to ask you to mellow out a little bit. They say too many people are getting hurt. Don't let anybody get hurt, but I don't think you should mellow out. Mellowing out? That's what Alanis Morissette had you motherfuckers do. If someone falls, pick 'em up." The tension ultimately boiled over during their performance of "Break Stuff". Durst briefly riled up the audience before the song by asking if they liked NSYNC, earning numerous boos and jeers. During the song's breakdown, Durst addressed the crowd:

Time to reach deep down inside, and take all that negative energy, all that negative energy, and let that shit out of your fucking system. You got girl problems? You got boy problems? You got parent problems? You got boss problems? You got job problems? You got a problem with me? You got a problem with yourself? It's time to take all that negative energy, and put it the fuck out!

Once the breakdown ended, concertgoers immediately began destroying smaller buildings adjacent to the stage and aggressively moshing or punching each other. A large number of attendees also began ripping plywood off the perimeter fence as they attempted to surf on the broken panels; this resulted in several pieces collapsing, dropping crowd surfers onto other fans and possibly crushing them. Terrified of the hostile crowd, several stage technicians assigned to cover the central sound tower placed a sign reading "The Alamo" below the cameras. The technicians were eventually ordered by the grounds crew to evacuate their post. Following the conclusion of the song, the broadcast team muted Durst's microphone while medical staff took in numerous injured concertgoers. Durst addressed the crowd again during a performance of "Nookie", telling the audience:

We already let all the negative energy out, it's time to reach down and bring that positive energy to this motherfucker. It's time to let yourself go right now, 'cause there are no motherfuckin' rules out there.

Following "Nookie", Durst walked to the edge of the stage and asked the crowd to assist him as he attempted to crowd-surf on the broken plywood. Security implored Durst not to crowd-surf, but he was undeterred as he asked the crowd to pass him a panel of plywood, on which he later sang "Faith", closing the band's set. Durst later explained that he had wanted to demonstrate himself enjoying the performance with his audience. Following the set, he was approached by Limp Bizkit manager Peter Katsis and several police officers who informed him that the plywood was ripped off buildings after fans had destroyed multiple structures during his band's performance. John Scher would later vilify Durst for his actions on numerous occasions, noting that numerous staff members had approached Durst between songs, asking him to calm the crowd.

Widely blamed for the violence, Durst later stated in an interview, "I didn't see anybody getting hurt. You don't see that. When you're looking out on a sea of people and the stage is twenty feet in the air and you're performing, and you're feeling your music, how do they expect us to see something bad going on?" Katsis defended Durst in an interview for Netflix 2022 documentary miniseries Trainwreck: Woodstock '99, claiming that "pointing the finger at Fred is about the last thing anybody should do. There really isn't a way to control 300,000 people. The best thing he could do is put on the best show possible, and that's what he did." Limp Bizkit guitarist Wes Borland would also defend Durst, instead blaming the festival's poor conditions. Jonathan Davis was present for Limp Bizkit's performance along with Korn bassist Fieldy; Davis initially condemned Durst's conduct, though he would later opine that Durst's actions were not the primary catalyst for the violence.

Nine Inch Nails frontman Trent Reznor later mocked Durst's actions during the festival in an October 1999 interview with Rolling Stone, telling interviewers that "Fred Durst can surf a piece of plywood up my ass".

Numerous fans and a social worker reported witnessing further incidents of sexual assault during both Limp Bizkit's and Metallica's performances.

=== Sunday, July 25 ===
Due to continually deteriorating conditions, violence and misconduct escalated further throughout the final day. In a 2021 interview, Jewel recalled a feeling of dread during her performance due to the audience's tension and bitterness; she described them as "really tired and very depleted." She, her manager, and the road crew immediately returned to their tour bus and fled the site following her set. Fans had begun regularly throwing bottles at the stage during her set, as well as Creed's earlier in the day. Sevendust drummer Morgan Rose recalled his band being escorted by numerous security guards to the stage for their set as attendees grew increasingly violent following Jewel's performance. Numerous witnesses recalled noticing a growing frequency of fights and property damage across the facility during Godsmack's performance.

The tension came to a head during the concert's final hours, as Red Hot Chili Peppers performed on the east stage and Megadeth performed on the west stage. One fan shone a laser pointer at Megadeth frontman Dave Mustaine in the middle of their performance, prompting him to criticize the crowd's behavior. A group of activists, led by the anti-gun violence organization PAX, had distributed candles to those stopping at their booth during the day, intending them to be lit for a candlelight vigil for the victims of the Columbine High School massacre during the Chili Peppers' performance of "Under the Bridge"; this had not been mentioned to or approved by local firefighting authorities. The crowd began to light the candles during the Chili Peppers' set, with some using them to start bonfires. Plywood and trash strewn around the site were used to fuel the fires, which had spread to both stages by the end of the Chili Peppers and Megadeth performances. After the Red Hot Chili Peppers finished their main set, the audience was informed about "a bit of a problem"; an audio tower had caught fire. The local fire department was called in to extinguish it, though they refused the call, fearing the audience. Shortly after the tower began burning, a large group of concertgoers climbed the base of its scaffolding, and the tower then collapsed onto the field.

Rome Mayor Joe Griffo pleaded with the Chili Peppers to return to the stage and calm the crowd in the midst of the chaos. Frontman Anthony Kiedis exclaimed that there was nothing he could do to quell the aggressive crowd as the fires continued to grow. After the band were convinced to return to the stage, Kiedis remarked of the fires, "Holy shit! It's, uh, Apocalypse Now out there."

Multiple media outlets blamed the Red Hot Chili Peppers for inciting the fires after performing a cover of the Jimi Hendrix song "Fire". Kiedis later wrote in his autobiography, Scar Tissue, that Hendrix's sister had instead asked them to play "Fire" in honor of Hendrix and his performance at the original Woodstock festival. He continued: "It was clear that this situation had nothing to do with Woodstock anymore. It wasn't symbolic of peace and love, but of greed and cashing in."

Prior to the start of the performances that day, rumors arose about a possible unannounced performance following the Red Hot Chili Peppers; Prince, the Rolling Stones, Bruce Springsteen, Guns N' Roses and Michael Jackson were among the artists thought to be the secret closing act. Scher and Lang continued to hype up the finale to the festival during multiple press conferences earlier in the afternoon. Following the Chili Peppers' performance, the finale was revealed to be a laser show and footage of Jimi Hendrix performing at the original festival in 1969, much to the anger of the attendees; the audience began to boo and attack the vendor booths in large groups.

Many large, high bonfires were burning before the end of the final performances. Participants danced in circles around the fires. Looking for more fuel, some tore off plywood panels from the supposedly inviolable "Peace Wall" enclosing the festival grounds. ATMs were tipped over and broken into; trailers full of merchandise, food, and equipment were forced open and burglarized; and numerous abandoned vendor booths or tents were turned over and set on fire. Approximately $22,000 in total was robbed from ATMs. Frightened festival staff members barricaded themselves inside the control tower, while the few vendors still onsite fled.

MTV was hired to cover the festival extensively; however, as the environment deteriorated, attendees grew increasingly hostile towards anchors and MTV's staff. Carson Daly recalls being pelted by bottles, rocks, and batteries frequently while he was covering the festival, noting that executives from MTV issued a statement to their staff on site that the network's parent firm Viacom could no longer guarantee their safety. The network ultimately evacuated its entire crew amidst the violence on Sunday night. Longtime anchor Kurt Loder likened the experience to covering news in a war zone, particularly during the final night as concertgoers began violently attacking the news trucks and reporters:

It was dangerous to be around. The whole scene was scary. There were just waves of hatred bouncing around the place ... It was clear we had to get out of there ... It was like a concentration camp. To get in, you get frisked to make sure you're not bringing in any water or food that would prevent you from buying from their outrageously priced booths. You wallow around in garbage and human waste. There was a palpable mood of anger.

— Kurt Loder to USA Today

By 11:45pm, the chaos had attracted attention from nearby law enforcement. A large force of 500 to 700 New York State Police troopers, local police officers, 25 firefighters, and various other law enforcement arrived. Most had riot control gear and proceeded to form a riot line that flushed the crowd to the northwest, away from the stage located at the eastern end of the airfield. Some reports state that numerous members of the crowd offered strong resistance, and they dispersed back toward the campground and out the main entrance. Others claim that the riot line allowed the concertgoers to "tire themselves out" in the campground area and that the fires were not contained until "well after sunrise". A report by SonicNet in 1999 estimated that it took law enforcement five hours to stop the riot.

== Fatalities ==
Three deaths occurred during the festival.

On Friday, a 44-year-old man, identified as Scott L. Stanley of Hyannis, Massachusetts, succumbed to heat exhaustion in the campground. An attendee of Woodstock 1969, Stanley was in attendance with his 16-year old foster son and other friends. The cause of death was later determined to be a heart attack.

On Saturday, 24-year-old David DeRosia collapsed in the crowd during Metallica's performance. Concert medical staff initially tried to treat his seizure and what they suspected to be a drug overdose. DeRosia was transported to the Air Force base medical center and then airlifted to University Hospital in Syracuse. A little more than an hour after he had collapsed, DeRosia's body temperature was 107 °F (42 °C). The following afternoon, he fell into a coma; he died at 12:09 pm on Monday, July 26, having never awoken. The autopsy report ruled the death accidental, and listed the cause of death as hyperthermia aggravated by cardiomegaly and obesity. In 2001, DeRosia's mother filed a lawsuit in the New York Supreme Court against the promoters of Woodstock 1999 and six doctors who worked at the event, maintaining that DeRosia died because of the concert promoters' negligence in not providing enough fresh water and adequate medical care for the attendees.

Tara K. Weaver, a 28-year-old woman from Troy, New York, was struck and killed by a speeding car while walking along an access road to leave the concert.

== Aftermath ==
Reports suggest that 42 to 44 people were arrested over the course of the festival. Ten state troopers and two state police supervisors were reportedly demoted or suspended for their behavior at the festival:

A supervisor of two state troopers who had posed with naked female attendees was suspended; a New York State prison guard was charged with sodomizing a 15-year-old girl during the riots; 253 people had been treated at area hospitals. The official numbers of fans treated on-site is between 4,000 and 4,500, yet Dr. Richard Kaskiw, one of the few area doctors who worked the medical tents, says that he was told by Vuoculo—who issued the official stats—that the numbers were far higher, the 8,000 to 10,000 range.

The New York State Department of Health reported 5,162 medical cases related to the festival.

After the conclusion of the festival, members of the National Organization for Women gathered outside the New York offices of one of the promoters to protest the sexual violence against women which had occurred. Police investigated four instances of rape that occurred during the concert. In October 2000, a woman sued Oneida County and Michael Lang for personal injury over sexual assault at the festival. Numerous lawsuits were filed against the organizers over the poor environmental conditions of the festival.

The New York Times solicited festival performers Rage Against the Machine for their opinion on the controversies surrounding the festival. Guitarist Tom Morello wrote in Neil Strauss's Times column on August 5, 1999:

Hey man, leave the kids alone. I've had enough of the frenzied demonization of young people surrounding Woodstock '99. Yes, Woodstock was filled with predators: the degenerate idiots who assaulted those women, the greedy promoters who wrung every cent out of thirsty concertgoers, and last but not least, the predator media that turned a blind eye to real violence and scapegoated the quarter of a million music fans at Woodstock '99, the vast majority of whom had the time of their lives.

The post-festival cleanup of the site took three weeks. Organizers spent an estimated $78,000 re-sodding the stage and mosh pit areas. Approximately 12 trailers, a small bus, and a number of booths and portable toilets were damaged by fire in the fray. Some of the trailers had coolant or propane tanks that exploded.

After numerous lawsuits and fines resulting from the incidents occurring throughout the event, the city of Rome only profited $200,000 from the entire event.

Following the event, San Francisco Examiner journalist Jane Ganahl cast doubt on the ability to promote another high-profile Woodstock concert and described the event as "the day the music died".

Lang attempted to orchestrate Woodstock 50 in 2019 at Watkins Glen International Raceway (later provisionally moved to Merriweather Post Pavilion) to mark the fiftieth anniversary of the original Woodstock festival. Due to logistical issues and lack of capital funding, he was forced to cancel the festival on July 31, 2019.

Limp Bizkit, who were heavily criticized for their role in the festival, performed at the 2021 Lollapalooza in Chicago while promoting their new album Still Sucks. Prior to the band's performance of "Break Stuff", Fred Durst told the crowd: "Let me make this clear, this is not Woodstock '99. Fuck all that bullshit."

== Legacy ==
Less than a week after the conclusion of Woodstock '99, Los Angeles concert promoters Goldenvoice (later AEG) announced the inaugural Coachella festival in Indio, California, with an emphasis to distance themselves from the unrest and damage that unfolded in Rome, including offering free water bottles and parking to those in attendance.

The Simpsons poked fun at the festival's incidents in the episode "It's a Mad, Mad, Mad, Mad Marge", in which Otto attends the festival; his clothes catch fire and he refuses to pay $8 for a bottle of water, only to be saved by a girl who uses her water bottle to extinguish him.

In 2000, the Insane Clown Posse held the inaugural Gathering of the Juggalos as a response to Woodstock '99 with the first edition taking place from July 20–21 at the Novi Expo Center in Novi, Michigan.

== Event schedule ==
During the four days of the festival, various bands and artists performed on one of the three different stages: "West Stage", "East Stage", and "Emerging Artists Stage".

=== July 22, 1999 (Thursday) (pre-show) ===
==== West Stage ====
- Frostbit Blue
- K.J. James
- Little Big Jam
- Gridley Paige
- Djoliba
- Red Herring
- Rattlebasket
- In Bloom
- Flipp
- 3rd Bass
- Vertical Horizon
- Strangefolk
- G. Love & Special Sauce
- The String Cheese Incident
- Bernie Worrell and the Woo Warriors
- George Clinton & the P-Funk All-Stars

==== AMP3.com Emerging Artists Stage ====
- Immoral Fibres
- Simmi
- Chris Glenn
- Gary Durdin & the Clay Pinps
- Johnny Rushmore

=== July 23, 1999 (Friday) ===
==== East Stage ====
- James Brown
- G. Love & Special Sauce
- Jamiroquai
- Live
- Sheryl Crow
- DMX
- The Offspring
- Korn
- Bush

==== West Stage ====
- Spitfire
- Oleander
- The Umbilical Brothers
- moe.
- Lit
- Buckcherry
- The Roots
- Insane Clown Posse
- George Clinton & the P-Funk All-Stars

==== Emerging Artists Stage ====
- F.o.N.
- Linda Rutherford & Celtic Fire
- Animal Planet
- Sugar Daddy
- Sticky Pistil
- Bijou Phillips
- Mike Errico
- King Konga
- Ben Lee
- Beth Hart Band
- Liars Inc.
- Chris Perez Band
- Sherri Jackson
- Chris McDermott
- Moby

=== July 24, 1999 (Saturday) ===
==== East Stage ====
- The Tragically Hip
- Kid Rock
- Wyclef Jean with the Refugee Allstars
- Counting Crows
- Dave Matthews Band
- Alanis Morissette
- Limp Bizkit
- Rage Against the Machine
- Metallica

==== West Stage ====
- Spitfire
- Guster
- Bruce Hornsby
- Everclear
- Ice Cube
- Los Lobos
- Mickey Hart/Planet Drum
- The Chemical Brothers

==== Rave Tent ====
- Young & Fabulous!
- Gargantua Soul
- 3
- Serial Joe
- American Pearl
- Full Devil Jacket
- Old Pike
- Strangefolk
- DDT
- 2 Skinnee J's
- Gigolo Aunts
- Fatboy Slim

=== July 25, 1999 (Sunday) ===
==== East Stage ====
- Willie Nelson
- The Brian Setzer Orchestra
- Everlast
- Elvis Costello
- Jewel
- Creed, featuring Robby Krieger
- Red Hot Chili Peppers

==== West Stage ====
- Spitfire
- Mike Ness
- Our Lady Peace
- Rusted Root
- Sevendust
- Collective Soul
- Godsmack
- Megadeth

==== Emerging Artists Stage ====
- Kirsti Gholson
- Moe Loughran
- The Scoldees
- The Supersuckers
- Stormy Mondays
- Big Sugar
- Muse
- John Oszajca
- Pound
- Pushmonkey
- Cyclefly
- Indigenous
- John Entwistle
- Reveille

== Recordings ==
Music from Woodstock 1999 was released on a two-disc compact disc set, Woodstock 1999. The album features 32 performing artists and was released on Epic Records on October 19, 1999.

A DVD of concert highlights entitled Woodstock 99 was released in March 2000. It features the more positive aspects of the concerts with one song each from 29 of the participating acts, along with interviews from the musicians and concert-goers.

Most of the Bush performance is available on the DVD The Best of '94–'99.

== Documentaries ==
The Ringer produced an eight-part documentary podcast series about the festival entitled Break Stuff: The Story of Woodstock '99.

The documentary Woodstock 99: Peace, Love, and Rage, directed by Garret Price, premiered on July 23, 2021, on HBO and HBO Max.

On August 3, 2022, Netflix premiered a three-part documentary miniseries entitled Trainwreck: Woodstock '99, featuring interviews with concertgoers, journalists present at the festival, artists who performed at the festival, and co-promoters John Scher and Michael Lang.

== See also ==
- Pol'and'Rock Festival, formerly known as Przystanek Woodstock (1995–present)
- Rock festival § Historic rock festivals
- Woodstock (1969)
- Woodstock '79 (1979)
- Woodstock '89 (1989)
- Woodstock '94 (1994)
- Heroes of Woodstock Tour (2009)
- Woodstock 50 (2019)
