= Ultimate Collection (Liza Minnelli album) =

Compilation album by Liza Minnelli
- Released: November 6, 2001
- Recorded: 1964–1989
- Genre: Traditional
- Label: Hip-O

Liza Minnelli chronology
The Capitol Years (2001)	Ultimate Collection (2001)	Life Is a Cabaret! (2002)

Ultimate Collection is a compilation album by American singer and actress Liza Minnelli, released in 2001 by Hip-O Records. The collection spans recordings from different stages of Minnelli's career, beginning with songs from her 1964 debut at age 18 and extending to tracks recorded approximately twenty-five years later. During this period, her songs encompassed genres such as rock, pop, country, dance, and synth-pop.

Overall, critics considered Ultimate Collection a broad, career-spanning compilation, noting its limitations due to omissions and its stronger appeal to a casual audience.

== Album details ==
The album spans nearly the entirety of Liza Minnelli's recording career, it opens with the song "Try to Remember" produced by Simon Rady (from the 1964 album Liza! Liza!), and closes with "Losing My Mind" (from the 1989 album Results), produced by the Pet Shop Boys. The track list includes songs that became career hits, such as "Theme from New York, New York", "Say Liza" (from Liza with a Z, 1972), "Maybe This Time", and "Cabaret" (from the 1972 album Live at the Olympia in Paris), as well as others from her albums that incorporate influences of rock, pop, country, dance, and synth-pop.

The collection is accompanied by a 16-page booklet featuring an essay written by Minnelli's historian (and that of her mother, actress and singer Judy Garland), Scott Schechter, along with several photographs.

== Critical reception ==
Professional ratings
Review scores
Source	Rating
AllMusic	3.5/5 stars
Deseret News	3/5 stars
The News-Press	2.5/5 stars

Jose F. Promis of AllMusic observed that creating a single-disc Ultimate Collection for Liza Minnelli is "misleading at best" due to "way too many omissions", though "this collection will most likely please the casual and the curious". Chris Hicks of Deseret News wrote that the compilation is "more of a career overview", while noting that "the early songs are best" before she entered a phase in which she "began to overproduce and 'belt' everything". Mark Marymont of The News Press wrote that this "21-song set draws from six of the labels she's recorded for and gives a fan a wide-ranging look at the musical side of her career".

Dave Tianen of Milwaukee Journal Sentinel included the album in his list of the best greatest hits albums to give as Christmas gifts, and wrote that "among its 21 tracks this should cover it for the casual fan". Rex Reed of The New York Observer wrote that the compilation "gives the superstar's cult 21 reasons to rejoice in a first-ever career overview".

== Track listing ==
Ultimate Collection
No.	Title	Writer(s)	Album	Length
1.	"Try to Remember"	Harvey Schmidt, Tom Jones	Liza! Liza!	4:17
2.	"Together (Wherever We Go)" (duet with Judy Garland)	Stephen Sondheim, Jule Styne	"Live" at the London Palladium	1:04
3.	"The Look of Love"	Hal David, Burt Bacharach	Liza Minnelli	3:30
4.	"Come Saturday Morning"	Fred Karlin, Dory Previn	Come Saturday Morning	1:46
5.	"Medley: MacArthur Park/Didn't We"	Jimmy Webb	Come Saturday Morning	4:06
6.	"Love Story"	Randy Newman	Come Saturday Morning	2:22
7.	"Simon"	Peter Allen	Come Saturday Morning	3:09
8.	"Cabaret"	Fred Ebb, John Kander	Live at the Olympia in Paris	3:24
9.	"Maybe This Time"	Fred Ebb, John Kander	New Feelin'	3:13
10.	"Can't Help Lovin' Dat Man"	Oscar Hammerstein, Jerome Kern	New Feelin'	2:38
11.	"Come Rain or Come Shine"	Harold Arlen, Johnny Mercer	New Feelin'	3:11
12.	"Stormy Weather"	Harold Arlen, Ted Koehler	New Feelin'	2:43
13.	"The Man I Love"	George Gershwin, Ira Gershwin	New Feelin'	2:46
14.	"Love for Sale"	Cole Porter	New Feelin'	2:36
15.	"God Bless the Child"	Billie Holiday, Arthur Herzog	New Feelin'	3:32
16.	"Say Liza (Liza With a Z)"	F. Ebb, J. Kander	Liza with a Z	3:13
17.	"Ring Them Bells"	F. Ebb, J. Kander	Liza with a Z	5:36
18.	"The Singer"	Walter Marks	The Singer	2:29
19.	"Theme from New York, New York"	F. Ebb, J. Kander	New York, New York [Soundtrack]	3:17
20.	"City Lights"	F. Ebb, J. Kander	The Act	6:23
21.	"Losing My Mind"	S. Sondheim	Results	4:12

== Personnel ==
Credits adapted from the album's liner notes.
