= 20th Century Masters – The Millennium Collection: The Best of Liza Minnelli =

Compilation album by Liza Minnelli
- Released: April 3, 2001
- Recorded: 1968–1972
- Genre: Traditional pop
- Label: A&M

Liza Minnelli chronology
16 Biggest Hits (2000)	20th Century Masters – The Millennium Collection: The Best of Liza Minnelli (2001)	The Capitol Years (2001)

20th Century Masters – The Millennium Collection: The Best of Liza Minnelli is a compilation album that collects notable recordings from the career of singer and actress Liza Minnelli. Released as part of a series of budget-friendly greatest hits compilations by Universal Music on April 3, 2001, the album features tracks from her 1960s and 1970s recordings with A&M Records, including Liza Minnelli (1968), Come Saturday Morning (1969), New Feelin' (1970), and Live at the Olympia in Paris (1972).

In terms of critical reception, AllMusic noted that the compilation highlights Minnelli's versatility as a singer and performer, bringing together songs that span styles from Broadway-influenced pop to contemporary 1960s pop and country-soul arrangements, reflecting the qualities that characterized her musical output during her years with A&M Records.

== Album details ==
The Best of Liza Minnelli is a compilation album that brings together some remarkable moments of singer and actress Liza Minnelli's career. The album was released as part of 20th Century Masters: The Millennium Collection, a series of compilation albums launched by Universal Music in 1999. According to Billboard, Universal has released 400 albums in its affordably priced series of greatest hits compilations. The series features selected tracks from the catalogs of a wide range of artists, of multiple genres, providing concise introductions to their work.The edition dedicated to Minnelli features songs by the singer from the 1960s and 1970s, recorded during her time with A&M Records, namely: Liza Minnelli (1968), Come Saturday Morning (969), New Feelin' (1970), and her second "live" album, Live at the Olympia in Paris from 1972. The photo used on the cover was taken by Guy Webster and was previously used as the cover for Minnelli's Come Saturday Morning album, released several years earlier.

The song "The Look of Love" is included on Minnelli's first album for A&M Records, Liza Minnelli (1968). Produced by Larry Marks, the album marked a departure from her typical Broadway-influenced style, exploring contemporary 1960s pop and the work of singer-songwriters. "The Look of Love" was highlighted as one of the standout tracks on the original album in reviews by Billboard and Cash Box. The songs "Come Saturday Morning" and a medley of "MacArthur Park" / "Didn't We" are included on Minnelli's 1969 album Come Saturday Morning. The former was originally performed by the Sandpipers for the soundtrack of the film The Sterile Cuckoo (1969), in which Minnelli starred. The album continued the stylistic shift begun on her previous release, with the recordings taking place over three sessions in August 1969 at Western Recorders and Columbia Records Studios. RPM magazine highlighted the medley as one of the album's standout tracks.

In an effort to update her sound for the contemporary rock-dominated market, A&M Records released in 1970 the album New Feelin', which features Minnelli interpreting classic songs from the Great American Songbook, dating from 1917 to 1940, with modern country-soul arrangements. Recorded in Muscle Shoals, Alabama, and produced by Rex Kramer, the album's sound is characterized by twangy guitars, energetic brass sections, and gospel-inspired backing vocals. For the present compilation, the label included seven of the ten tracks from the original album, including "Love for Sale" and "Stormy Weather (Keeps Rainin' All the Time)", which Record World magazine noted were revitalized by the soul and R&B arrangements of the renowned Muscle Shoals musicians.

== Critical reception ==
Professional ratings
Review scores
Source	Rating
AllMusic	4.5/5 stars
St. Petersburg Times	C

Kerry L. Smith of AllMusic wrote that the album captures Minnelli at her most powerful and dramatic, particularly in tracks such as "Maybe This Time" and "The Look of Love", where she demonstrates complete command of her voice and stage presence. The reviewer also emphasizes the sincerity and humanity that run through Minnelli's performances, noting "Come Saturday Morning" as a prime example of her deep emotional connection with the audience. Smith concludes that the collection reaffirms Minnelli's charisma, intensity, and unmatched talent as a performer.

Critic Gina Vivinetto of St. Petersburg Times, despite her confessed admiration for Liza Minnelli's "gigantic" talent and legendary heritage, considers The Millennium Collection a disappointment. She argues that the problem lies not with the artist's vocal performance, which is powerful and capable of "grabbing you by the lapel and shaking you," but with the track selection and, primarily, the "over-the-top" and "sappy" arrangements that accompany them. Vivinetto believes the attempts to modernize the classics with disco beats and rock fusions sound dated and fail to capture Minnelli's true essence and due value as a talented star in her own right, resulting in a collection that does not do justice to the artist's legacy.

== Track listing ==
20th Century Masters: The Millennium Collection – The Best of Liza Minnelli
No.	Title	Writer(s)	Album	Length
1.	"The Man I Love"	George Gershwin, Ira Gershwin	New Feelin'	2:48
2.	"Maybe This Time"	John Kander, Fred Ebb	New Feelin'	3:13
3.	"Come Saturday Morning"	Dory Previn, Fred Karlin	Come Saturday Morning	1:47
4.	"The Look of Love"	Burt Bacharach, Hal David	Liza Minnelli	3:32
5.	"Stormy Weather (Keeps Rainin' All the Time)"	Harold Arlen, Ted Koehler	New Feelin'	2:43
6.	"Love for Sale"	Cole Porter	New Feelin'	2:36
7.	"Come Rain or Come Shine"	Harold Arlen, Johnny Mercer	New Feelin'	3:11
8.	"Can't Help Lovin' That Man of Mine"	Jerome Kern, Oscar Hammerstein II	New Feelin'	2:38
9.	"God Bless the Child"	Arthur Herzog Jr., Billie Holiday	New Feelin'	3:32
10.	"MacArthur Park / Didn't We?"	Jimmy Webb	Come Saturday Morning	4:06
11.	"Liza (With a "Z")" (live)	Fred Ebb	Live at the Olympia in Paris	3:39
12.	"Cabaret" (live)	John Kander, Fred Ebb	Live at the Olympia in Paris	4:29

== Personnel ==
Credits adaptef from the 2001 CD 20th Century Masters – The Millennium Collection: The Best of Liza Minnelli (A&M Records, 069 490 877–2).

- Compilation produced by Mike Ragogna
- Mastered by Jim Phillips at Universal Mastering Studios West, North Hollywood, CA
- 24-bit mastering from the original master tapes
- Production coordination: Beth Stempel
- Editorial assistance: Barry Korkin
- Art direction: Vartan
- Design: Junie Osaki
- Photo research: Ryan Null
- Photography: Guy Webster/A&M files (cover, songs & credits panels, outside and inside inlay, back cover); inside folder: A&M files
- Special thanks to Andy McKaie and Sal Nunziato

== Release history ==
Country	Date	Format	Label	Ref.
United States	CD	April 3, 2001	A&M Records	
United States	CD-r	February 9, 2007	Interscope Records	
