= The Liza Minnelli Foursider =

Compilation album by Liza Minnelli
- Released: 1973
- Recorded: 1968–1972
- Genre: Traditional
- Label: A&M

Liza Minnelli chronology
The Singer (1973)	The Liza Minnelli Foursider (1973)	Live at the Winter Garden (1974)

The Liza Minnelli Foursider is the first compilation album by American singer and actress Liza Minnelli, released by A&M Records in 1973. Part of the label's budget-friendly Foursider series of double LPs, the collection compiled tracks from her four A&M releases: her self-titled debut (1968), Come Saturday Morning (1969), New Feelin' (1970), and the live album Live at the Olympia in Paris (1972).

Distinguished by its standardized green-colored cover, the album was sold at a single-LP price. It was met with favorable critical reception and charted on Billboard's Bubbling Under the Top LPs survey, becoming her second-best-charting album for the label. The compilation was later reissued multiple times on compact disc (CD) under different titles and artwork, though the track listing remained consistent with the original 1973 release.

== Album details ==
The album was released in 1973 under the A&M Records label, after the singer had released three studio albums and one live album with the label. The tracklist features songs from four albums released by A&M Records between 1968 and 1972, namely: Liza Minnelli (1968), Come Saturday Morning (1969), New Feelin' (1970), and the live album Live at the Olympia in Paris (1972).

The Foursider series was a collection of double LPs from the early 1970s, which compiled catalog tracks from A&M Records' roster of artists. The series had standardized covers, with each artist represented by a distinct color. Minnelli was represented by the color green. All material in the series was compiled and edited by Clare Baren and Richard Burns. Although it was a double album, it was sold at the price of a single LP.

Throughout the 1990s and 2000s, the compilation was re-released under different titles and cover art in CD format, including: A&M Gold Series (1991), Master Series (1999), and Millennium Edition (2000). Despite these variations, the tracks and original sequence remained unchanged. The Liza Minnelli Foursider was also released in CD format with its original cover.

== Critical reception ==
Professional ratings
Review scores
Source	Rating
AllMusic	3.5/5 stars

William Ruhlmann of AllMusic wrote that "[the album] is as good a sampler as could be compiled from the limited resources available and features some of the songs most identified with Minnelli, although not always in ideal versions".

Cash Box magazine wrote that the album is a testament to the singer’s incredible virtuosity, which, according to them, "shines in her luxurious delivery and emotional interpretation". They highlighted the songs "You Better Sit Down Kids" by Sonny Bono and "Cabaret" by Ebb-Kander, which became a classic.

== Commercial performance ==
Commercially, it became the second-best performing A&M Records album by Minnelli. On the Billboard magazine chart Bubbling Under the Top LPs, it debuted at position number 209 and remained on the list for three more consecutive weeks. Its peak position was number 207.

== Track listing ==
The Liza Minnelli Foursider
No.	Title	Writer(s)	Album	Length
1.	"Introduction"		Live at the Olympia in Paris	3:06
2.	"Everybody's Talkin' / Good Morning Starshine"	Fred Neil / G. MacDermot, G. Ragni, J. Rado	Live at the Olympia in Paris	3:29
3.	"Liza (With a "Z")"	Fred Ebb, John Kander	Live at the Olympia in Paris	3:46
4.	"I Will Wait for You"	Michel Legrand, Norman Gimbel	Live at the Olympia in Paris	3:40
5.	"Cabaret"	Fred Ebb, John Kander	Live at the Olympia in Paris	4:29
6.	"The Man I Love"	George Gershwin, Ira Gershwin	New Feelin'	2:45
7.	"Love Story"	Randy Newman	Come Saturday Morning	2:29
8.	"Married"	Fred Ebb, John Kander	Liza Minnelli	1:30
9.	"You'd Better Sit Down, Kids"	Sonny Bono	Liza Minnelli	3:29
10.	"Leavin' on a Jet Plane"	John Denver	Come Saturday Morning	3:15
11.	"Come Saturday Morning"	Dory Previn, Fred Karlin	Come Saturday Morning	1:46
12.	"Nevertheless (I'm in Love with You)"	B. Kalmar, H. Ruby	Come Saturday Morning	2:52
13.	"Lazy Bone"	Hoagy Carmichael, Johnny Mercer	New Feelin'	2:32
14.	"Come Rain or Come Shine"	Harold Arlen, Johnny Mercer	New Feelin'	3:12
15.	"My Mammy"	Walter Donaldson, Sam M. Lewis, Joe Young	Liza Minnelli	3:01
16.	"Waiting for My Friend"	George Melly, John Addison	Liza Minnelli	2:48
17.	"MacArthur Park / Didn't We"	Jimmy Webb	Come Saturday Morning	4:08
18.	"Maybe This Time"	Fred Ebb, John Kander	New Feelin'	3:12
19.	"God Bless the Child"	Arthur Herzog Jr., Billie Holiday	New Feelin'	3:30

== Personnel ==
Credits adapted from The Liza Minnelli Foursider LP (A&M Records, catalog no. SP 3524) liner notes.

- Art Direction – Roland Young (3)
- Artwork – Jim Gilbert (4)
- Compiled By, Edited By – Richard Burns*
- Design – Junie Osaki
- Producer – Larry Marks (tracks: A1 to A4, B2 to C2, C5 to D2)
- Producer, Arranged By – Rex Kramer (tracks: B1, C3, C4, D3, D4)
- Vocals – Liza Minnelli

== Charts ==
Weekly charts for The Liza Minnelli Foursider
Chart (1973)	Peak position
US Bubbling Under the Top LPs (Billboard)	207
