= When It Comes Down to It: 1968-1977 =

When It Comes Down To It.......1968–1977

Compilation album by Liza Minnelli
- Released: February 14, 2004
- Recorded: 1968–1977
- Genre: traditional
- Label: Raven

Liza Minnelli chronology
Liza's Back (2002)	When It Comes Down To It.......1968–1977 (2004)	The Best of Liza Minnelli (2004)

When It Comes Down To It.......1968–1977 is a compilation album by American singer and actress Liza Minnelli, released in 2004 on Raven Records label. The album features a selection of tracks from four Minnelli's albums released between 1968 and 1977, period in which the singer was signed by the record labels A&M and Columbia.

Although the album received favorable reviews from music critics, it failed to chart on any major music rankings.

== Album details ==
Released in 2002, the anthology features a curated selection of tracks from four albums released between 1968 and 1977: Liza Minnelli (1968), Come Saturday Morning (1970), The Singer (1973), and Tropical Nights (1977). From this last album comes the track that lends its title to the compilation. In addition to selections from these albums, the compilation includes three standalone singles: "Mr. Emery Won’t Be Home" (1972), "Harbour" (1974), and "More Than I Like You" (1974).

The album is a Raven Records anthology, described by the label as "an illuminating and revealing collection of songs from a young and curious vocalist, navigating freely among the prominent composers and lyricists of the late 1960s and early 1970s, within the pop/rock and singer-songwriter realms." Some of the tracks were released on CD for the first time and, according to Raven, "possess surprising delicacy and musicality, with a gently eccentric tone and engaging arrangements." The release also includes a 16-page booklet featuring an extensive collection of images and detailed liner notes.

== Critical reception ==
Professional ratings
Review scores
Source	Rating
AllMusic	4.5/5 stars

William Ruhlmann, writing for AllMusic, remarked that Minnelli "was far more comfortable with traditional pop than with the singer-songwriter material of the '60s and '70s" included in this set. He highlighted that Minnelli's strongest performances were of songs either written specifically for her or ones to which she had a clear emotional connection, such as "Come Saturday Morning" and "The Singer." Ruhlmann also noted that for longtime fans, the greatest highlight was the inclusion of rare singles, particularly both sides of a 45 that featured two of Allen’s finest compositions: "Harbour" and "More Than I Like You."

A reviewer from BroadwayWorld encouraged readers to "forget" the songs Minnelli is most widely known for and instead appreciate the compilation for offering some of the best material from the late 1960s and early 1970s.

== Track listing ==
No.	Title	Writer(s)	Album	Length
1.	"Love Story"	Randy Newman	Come Saturday Morning	2:22
2.	"The Debutante's Ball"	Randy Newman	Liza Minnelli	2:54
3.	"Happyland"	Randy Newman	Liza Minnelli	2:24
4.	"So Long Dad"	Randy Newman	Liza Minnelli	2:09
5.	"For No One"	John Lennon / Paul McCartney	Liza Minnelli	2:18
6.	"Wherefore and Why"	Gordon Lightfoot	Come Saturday Morning	2:32
7.	"Wailing of the Willow"	Harry Nilsson	Come Saturday Morning	2:00
8.	"You Better Sit Down Kids"	Sonny Bono	Liza Minnelli	3:27
9.	"Raggedy Ann & Raggedy Andy"	Marilyn Bergman, Alan Bergman, Walter Marks	Come Saturday Morning	3:27
10.	"Leavin' on a Jet Plane"	John Denver	Come Saturday Morning	3:10
11.	"Don't Let Me Lose This Dream"	Aretha Franklin, Ted White	Come Saturday Morning	3:00
12.	"Come Saturday Morning"	Dory Previn, Fred Karlin	Come Saturday Morning	1:45
13.	"(The Tragedy of) Butterfly McHeart"	Peter Allen, Chris Allen	Liza Minnelli	2:16
14.	"Simon"	Peter Allen	Come Saturday Morning	2:16
15.	"Harbour"	Peter Allen	Single only	2:16
16.	"More Than I Like You"	Peter Allen	Single only	2:16
17.	"Mr. Emery Won't Be Home"	Bob Stone	Single only	2:48
18.	"Don't Let Me Be Lonely Tonight"	James Taylor	The Singer	3:52
19.	"Dancing in the Moonlight"	Sherman Kelly	The Singer	3:19
20.	"I Believe in Music"	Mac Davis	The Singer	3:37
21.	"Use Me"	Bill Withers	The Singer	3:39
22.	"The Singer"	Walter Marks	The Singer	2:31
23.	"I'd Love You to Want Me"	Kent Lavoie (Lobo)	The Singer	3:36
24.	"I Love Every Little Thing About You"	Stevie Wonder	Tropical Nights	3:11
25.	"When It Comes Down to It"	Minnie Riperton, Richard Rudolph	Tropical Nights	3:35
26.	"Come Home Babe"	Jim Grady	Tropical Nights	3:21

== Personnel ==
Credits adapted from When It Comes Down To It.......1968–1977 CD.

- Produced by Larry Marks (1–14), Carl Maduri (15–16), Snuff Garrett (17–23), Rik Pekkonen and Steve March (24–26)
- Arranged by Dick Hazard (1,7,9,11,13,14), Michel Colombier (10,12) Nick De Caro (2,3), Al Coppe (17–22), Jim Grady (23–26)
