= Life Is a Cabaret! =

Compilation album by Liza Minnelli
- Released: 2002
- Genres: Pop, jazz, synth-pop
- Label: Columbia

Liza Minnelli chronology
Ultimate Collection (2001)	Life Is a Cabaret! (2002)	Liza's Back (2002)

Life Is a Cabaret! (official title with subtitle: Life Is a Cabaret! – The Very Best of Liza Minnelli) is a compilation album by American singer and actress Liza Minnelli. Released in 2002, it is the second greatest hits compilation of Minnelli's work by Columbia Records, following 16 Biggest Hits (2000). The collection includes material from her studio albums, live recordings, and previously single-only releases, such as selections from the musical Chicago and the charity single "The Day After That".

The album represents one of several attempts to compile Minnelli's work from multiple record labels. It became her first UK chart entry since 1996, peaking at number 77 on the UK Albums Chart. The tracklist focuses on her Columbia/CBS recordings from 1970 to 1995 excluding her earlier work with Capitol Records.

== Album details ==
According to John Bush of AllMusic, Minnelli's extensive discography has always been a challenge for compiling a comprehensive collection of her biggest hits, due to a major obstacle: her material was scattered across multiple record labels, making a collection of her most iconic songs commercially unviable and bureaucratically complicated.

The track listing of Life Is a Cabaret! - The Very Best of Liza Minnelli focuses on Minnelli's sound recordings released between 1970 and 1995 under the labels A&M, Columbia, CBS, and Epic, specifically from the albums: New Feelin' (1970), Liza with a Z (1972), The Singer (1973), Live at the Winter Garden (1974), Results (1989), and Live from Radio City Music Hall (1992).

The compilation also includes songs previously released only as singles, such as: "My Own Best Friend" and "All That Jazz," from the Broadway musical Chicago, in which Minnelli played the role of Roxie Hart while the original star, Gwen Verdon, was on vocal rest. Other tracks include "More Than I Like You" and "Harbour" (the A and B sides of the same single, released in 1974) and "The Day After That" (1993), whose proceeds were donated to the AmfAR (American Foundation for AIDS Research).

== Critical reception ==
Writing for the British newspaper The Times, David Sinclair noted that Minnelli has a tendency to overperform, which he found evident in this compilation. He also pointed out that the album includes songs already familiar in Minnelli's previous collections, such as "Maybe This Time," "Liza with a Z," "Cabaret," and "Losing My Mind."

== Commercial performance ==
The album marked Minnelli's first appearance on the UK Albums Chart since 1996, when her album Gently spent two weeks on the chart (July 6 and 13, 1996). Life Is a Cabaret! - The Very Best of Liza Minnelli peaked at No. 77 on April 13, 2002, its only appearance on the chart. According to Music Week, Minnelli's compilation narrowly missed entering the Top 75, falling short by just 47 copies.

== Track listing ==
No.	Title	Album	Length
1.	"All That Jazz"	Chicago soundtrack	3:04
2.	"New York, New York"	Live from Radio City Music Hall	5:38
3.	"Say Liza (Liza With A "Z")"		3:15
4.	"Maybe This Time"	New Feelin'	2:47
5.	"God Bless The Child"	New Feelin'	2:57
6.	"Ring Them Bells"	Liza with a Z	5:16
7.	"Losing My Mind"	Results	4:08
8.	"Shine On Harvest Moon"	Live at the Winter Garden	3:35
9.	"My Own Best Friend"	Chicago soundtrack	3:10
10.	"Some People"	Live at the Winter Garden	3:19
11.	"Quiet Thing"	Live at the Winter Garden	4:34
12.	"Harbour"	More Than I Like You / Harbour (single)	3:15
13.	"Love Pains"	Results	4:11
14.	"You're So Vain"	The Singer	3:28
15.	"More Than I Like You"	More Than I Like You / Harbour (single)	2:57
16.	"Dancing In The Moonlight"	The Singer	3:18
17.	"Mr. Emery Won't Be Home"	Mr. Emery Won't Be Home (single)	2:48
18.	"Here I'll Stay / Our Love Is Here To Stay"	Live from Radio City Music Hall	5:30
19.	"The Day After That"	The Day After That (single)	4:00
20.	"Cabaret"	Live at the Winter Garden	4:01

== Charts ==
Chart (2002)	Peak position
UK Albums (Official Charts)	77
