= The Capitol Years (Liza Minnelli album) =

Compilation album by Liza Minnelli
- Released: June 5, 2001
- Recorded: 1964–1966
- Genre: Traditional
- Label: EMI

Liza Minnelli chronology
20th Century Masters – The Millennium Collection: The Best of Liza Minnelli (2001)	The Capitol Years (2001)	Ultimate Collection (2001)

The Capitol Years is a compilation album by American singer and actress Liza Minnelli. Released in 2001 by EMI, it features a selection of tracks from recordings made while the artist was signed to Capitol Records. (Note: Although the compilation focuses on recordings from Capitol Records, it only includes songs from Minnelli’s three studio albums, with no tracks from singles added. Her earliest releases with the label were two 7-inch singles, featuring the songs "Day Dreaming" and "Our Summer Love.")

In 2003, the album was re-released with a new title, The Essential, along with changes to the cover art and liner notes. The tracklist, however, remained entirely unchanged in both content and order.

== Background ==
Liza Minnelli’s recording career began in 1961 when she recorded three songs at Dick Charles Recording Studio in New York City, produced by Marvin Hamlisch. These recordings were not intended for commercial release but were instead a Christmas gift for her mother, actress and singer Judy Garland. During the autumn of 1962, Minnelli recorded songs for the soundtrack of the animated film Journey Back to Oz and later for the musical Best Foot Forward. Her first commercially released single was a 7-inch single featuring the songs "You Are for Loving" and "What Do You Think I Am?" by Cadence Records in 1963. This single became one of Minnelli’s biggest early successes, selling over 500,000 copies and attracting the attention of Capitol Records, which signed her that same year.

Minnelli recorded three albums and several singles for Capitol between 1963 and 1966, when she was between 17 and 20 years old. While her first album, Liza! Liza! (1964), achieved considerable success (peaking at #115 on the Billboard 200 and selling 500,000 copies), the other two (It Amazes Me (1965) and There Is a Time (1966)) failed to chart, despite receiving positive reviews from critics. All the album’s arrangements were handled by Peter Matz.

The tracklist of The Capitol Years includes the entirety of Liza! Liza! (though in a different order) along with five tracks each from her subsequent albums (It Amazes Me and There Is a Time).

== Critical reception ==
Professional ratings
Review scores
Source	Rating
AllMusic	3/5 stars

Critical reviews were generally favorable. William Ruhlmann of AllMusic wrote that the collection "showcases some of Minnelli's excellent early recordings," though he noted that "as a single-CD compilation of her Capitol Records output, it could have been better curated and sequenced".

Claudio Botelho of Jornal do Brasil noted that while traces of Minnelli’s youth (such as her adolescent nasality and softer pronunciation, before the exaggerated consonants that became her trademark) are evident, the performances are exquisite, with the singer pouring her heart into every word. He particularly highlighted the songs "Maybe This Time" and "Together Wherever We Go (Gypsy)".

== Track listing ==
No.	Title	Writer(s)	Album	Length
1.	"Blue Moon"	Richard Rodgers, Lorenz Hart	Liza! Liza!	2:04
2.	"I Knew Him When"	Harold Arlen, E.Y. "Yip" Harburg, Ira Gershwin	Liza! Liza!	2:41
3.	"Try To Remember"	Harvey Schmidt, Tom Jones	Liza! Liza!	4:20
4.	"Meantime"	Al Stillman, Robert Allen	Liza! Liza!	3:37
5.	"Don't Ever Leave Me"	Jerome Kern, Oscar Hammerstein II	Liza! Liza!	2:37
6.	"The Travelin' Life"	Howard Liebling, Marvin Hamlisch	Liza! Liza!	2:51
7.	"Maybe Soon"	Richard Everitt, Laurence Stith	Liza! Liza!	3:17
8.	"It's Just A Matter Of Time"	R. Everitt, L. Stith	Liza! Liza!	3:04
9.	"Together Wherever We Go (Gypsy)"	Stephen Sondheim, Jule Styne	Liza! Liza!	3:44
10.	"Maybe This Time"	John Kander, Fred Ebb	Liza! Liza!	3:30
11.	"I'm All I've Got"	Milton Schafer, Ronny Graham	Liza! Liza!	1:51
12.	"If I Were In Your Shoes"	J. Kander, F. Ebb	Liza! Liza!	3:22
13.	"Plenty Of Time"	Kander, Ebb	It Amazes Me	4:16
14.	"It Amazes Me"	Cy Coleman, Carolyn Leigh	It Amazes Me	3:09
15.	"Wait 'Till You See Him"	R. Rodgers, L. Hart	It Amazes Me	2:44
16.	"I Like The Likes Of You"	Vernon Duke, Yip Harburg	It Amazes Me	2:16
17.	"My Shining Hour"	Johnny Mercer, Harold Arlen	It Amazes Me	3:22
18.	"The Days Of The Waltz"	Jacques Brel, Holt	There Is A Time	4:20
19.	"I'll Build A Stairway To Paradise"	Buddy DeSylva, George Gershwin, Ira Gershwin	There Is A Time	2:07
20.	"One Of Those Songs (Girls Of The Folies-Bergere)"	Calvi, Holt	There Is A Time	1:47
21.	"I (Who Have Nothing)"	Jerry Leiber and Mike Stoller, Mogol, Carlo Donida	There Is A Time	2:43
22.	"There Is A Time (Le Temps)"	Lees, Charles Aznavour, Davis	There Is A Time	2:17
