= Come Saturday Morning =

Come Saturday Morning may refer to:

- Come Saturday Morning (song), a popular song by Fred Karlin and Dory Previn, published in 1970
- Come Saturday Morning (Jackie Gleason album), a 1970 album by Jackie Gleason
- Come Saturday Morning (Liza Minnelli album), 1969
- Come Saturday Morning (The Sandpipers album), 1970
