= The Dream (Mark Murphy album) =

1995 studio album by Mark Murphy

Studio album by Mark Murphy
- Released: 1995
- Recorded: 1969–1993
- Studio: NOB Audio Music Productions, Hilversum, Netherlands
- Genre: Vocal jazz
- Length: 1:07:28
- Label: Jive
- Producer: Jan van Riemsdijk

Mark Murphy chronology
Just Jazz	The Dream	Shadows

The Dream is a 1995 studio album by Mark Murphy.

This album is a series of recordings from 1969–1993 arranged and conducted by Rob Pronk and Dolf van der Linden with the Metropole Orchestra. Many of the recordings were originally broadcast on various radio shows in England and Holland. These lush string ballad arrangements were compiled by Joop de Roo for the release on the Austrian music label Jive.

== Background ==
In his book, This is Hip: The Life of Mark Murphy, author Peter Jones reveals that during his years in Europe, Mark Murphy made periodic recordings with the Metropole Orchestra. He notes these aired on radio shows including Hilversum Greets Radio 2 (1982), The Metropole Orchestra (1985), and Easy Does It (1990s). These recordings and others from as early as 1969 up to 1993 were compiled into The Dream by Joop de Roo, former Head of Entertainment Radio and Television, Hilversum, Netherlands.

Professional ratings
Review scores
Source	Rating
Virgin Encyclopedia of Popular Music	4/5 stars

Murphy contributes an original song (track 7 from 1993), which is a tribute to Sarah Vaughan (who died in 1990), and lyrics (track 10 from 1969) to a Francy Boland song on this release.

== Reception ==
In his book, A Biographical Guide to the Great Jazz and Pop Singers, author Will Friedwald said that Very Early and The Dream, with the Dutch Metropole Orchestra are Mark Murphy's "best projects with a large ensemble - especially The Dream, which was recorded in bits and pieces over a twenty year period". Writing for The Village Voice in 1996, Friedwald called The Dream one of Murphy's very best recordings and singles out "Sometimes When You're Lonely". The AllMusic entry does not review or rate the release. The Virgin Encyclopedia of Popular Music rates the release as excellent (4/5). Author, singer, musician, and composer Peter Jones includes The Dream in his list of top 10 essential Mark Murphy albums. He also listed "Since I Fell for You" (track 2) as part of his article10 tracks by Mark Murphy I Can’t Do Without… in the London Jazz News series "10 Tracks I Can't Do Without".

Author Jones noted that "one can detect weaknesses in the vocal performances from 1991" and the recording of the standard "Laura" "suffers from nearly all of Murphy's more annoying mannerisms". However, he calls the album "generally excellent" and "of consistently high quality" offering Murphy "the sort of large-scale instrumental backing that had been scandalously denied him in the US since the end of his Decca contract".

== Track listing ==
1. "The Dream" (Stanley Ellis) – 4:27
2. "Since I Fell for You" (Buddy Johnson) – 5:19
3. "So Many Stars" (Sérgio Mendes, Alan Bergman, Marilyn Bergman) – 4:28
4. "Laura" (David Raksin, Johnny Mercer) – 3:43
5. "This is New" (Kurt Weill, Ira Gershwin) – 4:21
6. "Sometimes When You‘re Lonely" (Cy Coleman) – 4:55
7. "Gone (Dedicated To Sarah Vaughan)" (Mark Murphy (singer)) – 6:01
8. "Estate" (Bruno Martino, Bruno Brighetti) – 4:00
9. "Down Here On the Ground" (Lalo Schifrin, Gale Garnett) – 5:44
10. "Hopeless (A Blue Girl in a Red Sunrise)" (Francy Boland, Murphy) – 4:04
11. "Stairway to Paradise" (George Gershwin, Arthur Francis, Buddy DeSylva) – 4:02
12. "I See Your Face Before Me" (Arthur Schwartz, Howard Dietz) – 4:32
13. "All in Love is Fair" (Stevie Wonder) – 3:17
14. "We Can Try Love Again" (Dori Caymmi, Tracy Mann) – 3:54
15. "When the World Was Young" (Philippe-Gérard, J. Mercer) – 4:41

== Personnel ==
Performance

- Mark Murphy – vocals
- Metropole Orkest – orchestra
- Rob Pronk – arranger (except tracks 3, 10, 13, 15), conductor (1, 4, 5, 6, 7, 8, 12, 14)
- Dolf van der Linden – conductor (tracks 2, 3, 9, 10, 11, 13, 15)
- Peter Herbolzheimer – arranger (tracks 3, 13, 15)
- Jerry van Rooijen – arranger (track 10)
- Cor Bakker – piano solo (tracks 4,12)
- Erno Olah – violin solo (track 12)

Production

- Pieter Nieboer – engineer, remixing, mastering
- Joop de Roo – liner notes, remixing, mastering
- Jan van Riemsdijk – producer
- Nicolas Naveau – cover art
- Stefan Badegruber – photography
- Wolfgang Weitlander – liner notes
