= The Best of Liza Minnelli =

Compilation album by Liza Minnelli
- Released: September 14, 2004
- Recorded: 1972–1992
- Genre: Jazz, traditional
- Label: Columbia

Liza Minnelli chronology
When It Comes Down To It.......1968–1977 (2004)	The Best of Liza Minnelli (2004)	The Complete Capitol Collection (2006)

The Best of Liza Minnelli is a compilation album by American singer and actress Liza Minnelli. Released in 2004, it spans fifteen songs from Minnelli’s classic years with the record labels Columbia, EMI, and MCA.

The tracklist includes a generous selection of show tunes, including a previously unreleased version of "Me and My Baby" from the musical Chicago. Lyricist Fred Ebb, who frequently collaborated with Minnelli throughout her career, contributed an essay included in the album’s liner notes.

== Album details ==
Liza Minnelli’s career spanned decades of success across multiple fields, from music to theatre and film. As a result, compiling a comprehensive collection of her greatest hits from her extensive discography has always faced a notable obstacle: her recordings are scattered across multiple labels, making their consolidation into a single album a commercially and bureaucratically challenging project.

The tracklists of most compilations predating The Best of Liza Minnelli specifically featured songs released by a single label. For her early recording career under Capitol Records, these include compilations such as A Touch of Class (1997), The Capitol Collection (2001), and Essential (2003). Songs from her tenure with A&M Records are featured on compilations like The Liza Minnelli Foursider (1973) and The Collection (1998). Her Columbia era is represented on compilations such as Liza Minnelli (1982), All That Jazz (1999), and 16 Biggest Hits (2000).

The Best of Liza Minnelli includes songs from eight of Minnelli’s albums (three soundtracks: Cabaret (1972), Chicago, and New York, New York (1977); three live albums: Liza with a Z (1972), Live at the Winter Garden (1974), and Live from Radio City Music Hall (1992); and two studio albums: The Singer (1973) and Results (1989)). Each major phase of her career is represented with a song, whether from studio recordings or later live performances.

== Critical reception ==
Professional ratings
Review scores
Source	Rating
AllMusic	4.5/5 stars
Tom Hull	B+

John Bush of AllMusic wrote that for fans unable to attend Minnelli's concerts, the compilation "works as the next best thing." He noted that previous compilations "unsuccessfully dealt with the fact that Minnelli’s material is scattered across several labels" and that The Best of Liza Minnelli "features some creative licensing to make it the best collection yet."

In his review, critic Tom Hull highlighted Minnelli’s ability to breathe life into nostalgic songs. However, he pointed out moments on the album where her energy and enthusiasm vary.

Goldmine critic Gillian G. Gaar praised the inclusion of live tracks, noting that Minnelli’s stage performances are where she truly shines. He singled out "There Is a Time," "Some People," "Say Liza (Liza with a 'Z')," and "Me and My Baby" as standout tracks. As a drawback, he mentioned the album’s "short" 50-minute runtime. Ultimately, he wrote that The Best of Liza Minnelli "is a fine overview of some of Minnelli’s best work."

== Track listing ==
No.	Title	Writer(s)	Album	Length
1.	"Cabaret"	John Kander; Fred Ebb	Cabaret	3:33
2.	"Some People" (Live)	Jule Styne, Stephen Sondheim	Live from Radio City Music Hall	3:18
3.	"There Is a Time" (Live)	Gene Lees, Charles Aznavour, Jeff Davis	Live at the Winter Garden	2:12
4.	"Me and My Baby"	John Kander; Fred Ebb	Single (from the musical Chicago)	1:53
5.	"My Own Best Friend"	John Kander; Fred Ebb	Single (from the musical Chicago)	3:12
6.	"Old Friend" (Live)	Stephen Sondheim	Live from Radio City Music Hall	1:12
7.	"The Singer"	Walter Marks	The Singer	2:32
8.	"Ring Them Bells" (Live)	John Kander; Fred Ebb	Liza with a Z	5:16
9.	"All That Jazz"	John Kander; Fred Ebb	Single (from the musical Chicago)	3:06
10.	"A Quiet Thing" (Live)	John Kander; Fred Ebb	Live at the Winter Garden	3:21
11.	"Losing My Mind"	Stephen Sondheim	Results	4:13
12.	"Maybe This Time"	John Kander; Fred Ebb	Cabaret	3:11
13.	"Say Liza (Liza with a "Z")" (Live)	John Kander; Fred Ebb	Liza with a Z	2:24
14.	"Stepping Out" (Live)	John Kander; Fred Ebb	Live from Radio City Music Hall	7:28
15.	"Theme from New York, New York"	John Kander; Fred Ebb	New York, New York	3:19

== Personnel ==
Credits adapted from The Best of Liza Minnelli CD.

- Compilation Producers: Didier C. Deutsch & Darcy M. Proper
- Mastered by Darcy M. Proper at Sony Music Studios, New York
- Legacy A&R: Steve Berkowitz, Patti Matheny & Darren Salmieri
- Project Director: Joy Monfried
- Art Direction & Design: Elisabeth Ladwig
- Photography, front cover – Wayne Knight
- Collection/Charsley Entertainment Archives: interior booklet photos & booklet back cover – Michael Ochs Archives.com; inner tray card – Frank Diernhammer/Shooting Star
- Tape Research: Mike Kull
- Special thanks: Susan Jacobs, Peter Cho & Sheila Johnson, Sony Music
