= The Complete Capitol Collection =

Compilation album by Liza Minnelli
- Released: August 8, 2006
- Recorded: 1964–1966
- Genre: Jazz, traditional
- Label: DRG

Liza Minnelli chronology
The Best of Liza Minnelli (2004)	The Complete Capitol Collection (2006)	The Complete A&M Recordings (2008)

The Complete Capitol Collection is a compilation album by American singer and actor Liza Minnelli, released by the record label DRG in 2006. The two-disc anthology comprehensively gathers Minnelli's complete recorded output for Capitol Records, featuring her three studio albums—Liza! Liza! (1964), It Amazes Me (1965), and There Is a Time (1966)—in their original running order, alongside singles originally released only on 7-inchs vinyl. The collection marked the first time these early albums were reissued in their entirety on compact disc (CD), featuring tracks digitally remastered in 24-bit resolution for enhanced audio clarity.

Critically, the compilation has been noted for displaying the artist's full range of talents, making it a welcome release for fans. Reviews also highlighted the inherent challenge of marketing a traditional pop singer during the British Invasion era, observing that this commercial struggle would persist throughout the artist's career.

== Background ==
Minnelli's first phonographic recordings took place when she was still a teenager. At just 17, she had starred in the Off-Broadway play Best Foot Forward, for which she even recorded songs from the soundtrack. The publicity generated by her vocal and acting skills led to TV appearances and the recording of a single, "You Are For Loving". With this moderate success, Capitol Records signed her and gradually released singles, followed by three studio albums: Liza! Liza! (1964), It Amazes Me (1965), and There Is a Time (1966). Although they were well received by music critics, only the first album performed well commercially, becoming the only one to chart on Billboard's Top LPs list.

== Album details ==
For decades, Capitol Records did not reissue the albums in compact disc (CD) format, despite most of the songs having appeared in a substantial number of compilations released over the years. (Note: Compilations with tracks taken from the Capitol Records albums include: Best of Liza Minnelli: The Capitol Years (which was reissued with new covers and titles in 2001, under the name The Capitol Collection and Essential, in 2003); and Finest, from 2009.) The Complete Capitol Collection compiles the three albums in their entirety, with their track listings in the order in which the albums were originally released.

Containing 55 songs in total, the double-CD set presents all tracks newly remastered in 24-bit. The collection is further expanded with the inclusion of singles that were previously only available on 7-inchs records. The anthology was released by DRG in 2006.

In an interview, the compilation's producer, Scott Schechter, revealed: "The use of the original session tapes eliminated an entire layer of added reverb that was heard on the original LPs, and as a result, it has a much cleaner, warmer, and brighter sound, with much more presence in Liza's voice, as it should be. She sounds like she's in the same room, singing directly to you. You can hear everything better than ever before. It's like hearing the songs for the first time and [having] a completely new listening experience".

== Critical reception ==
Professional ratings
Review scores
Source	Rating
AllMusic	4.5/5 stars

William Ruhlmann of AllMusic wrote that "all of [Liza Minnelli's] talents are on display in these early recordings, which will be warmly received by her fans". He observed that the collection reveals the challenges Capitol and Minnelli faced in marketing a young, traditional pop singer during the British Invasion era, a struggle he notes never truly eased for her in the commercial record market.

On November 23, 2013, Ben Rimalower of Playbill included The Complete Capitol Collection in his list of the twelve best albums of Liza Minnelli's career, and wrote that "although these recordings show an immature Minnelli, still somewhat unsure of how to express herself more artistically in song, the pure heart and throat are undeniable".

== Track listing ==
Disc 1
No.	Title	Writer(s)	Album	Length
1.	"It's Just a Matter of Time"	Richard Everitt, Laurence Stith	Liza! Liza!	3:06
2.	"If I Were in Your Shoes"	John Kander, Fred Ebb	Liza! Liza!	3:22
3.	"Meantime"	Al Stillman, Robert Allen	Liza! Liza!	3:37
4.	"Try to Remember"	Harvey Schmidt, Tom Jones	Liza! Liza!	4:20
5.	"I'm All I've Got"	Milton Schafer, Ronny Graham	Liza! Liza!	1:55
6.	"Maybe Soon"	Richard Everitt, Laurence Stith	Liza! Liza!	3:17
7.	"Maybe This Time"	John Kander, Fred Ebb	Liza! Liza!	3:30
8.	"Don't Ever Leave Me"	Jerome Kern, Oscar Hammerstein II	Liza! Liza!	2:40
9.	"The Travelin' Life"	Howard Liebling, Marvin Hamlisch	Liza! Liza!	2:52
10.	"Together (Wherever We Go)"	Stephen Sondheim, Jule Styne	Liza! Liza!	3:45
11.	"Blue Moon"	Richard Rodgers, Lorenz Hart	Liza! Liza!	2:03
12.	"I Knew Him When"	Harold Arlen, E.Y. "Yip" Harburg, Ira Gershwin	Liza! Liza!	2:45
13.	"Wait Till You See Him"	Richard Rodgers, Lorenz Hart	It Amazes Me	2:48
14.	"My Shining Hour"	Johnny Mercer, Harold Arlen	It Amazes Me	3:23
15.	"I Like The Likes Of You"	Vernon Duke, Yip Harburg	It Amazes Me	2:17
16.	"It Amazes Me"	Cy Coleman, Carolyn Leigh	It Amazes Me	3:10
17.	"Looking at You"	Cole Porter	It Amazes Me	2:41
18.	"I Have Never Seen Snow"	Arlen	It Amazes Me	4:52
19.	"Plenty Of Time"	Kander, Ebb	It Amazes Me	4:18
20.	"For Every Man There's A Woman"	Arlen, Leo Robin	It Amazes Me	2:41
21.	"Lorelei"	George Gershwin, Ira Gershwin	It Amazes Me	2:35
22.	"Shouldn't There Be Lightning?"	Alexander, Goldenberg	It Amazes Me	3:08
23.	"Nobody Knows You When You're Down And Out"	Jimmy Cox	It Amazes Me	2:50
24.	"Walk Right In / How Come You Do Me Like You Do"	Hosea Woods, Gus Cannon / Gene Austin, Roy Bergere	It Amazes Me	3:02
25.	"Imprevu"	L. Geraci, Johnny Richards	Single Release	3:02

Disc 2
No.	Title	Writer(s)	Album	Length
1.	"There Is a Time (Le Temps)"	Lees, Charles Aznavour, Davis	There Is A Time	2:22
2.	"I (Who Have Nothing)"	Jerry Leiber and Mike Stoller, Mogol, Carlo Donida	There Is A Time	2:41
3.	"M'Lord"	Marguerite Monnot, Yussef Mustacchi	There Is A Time	2:27
4.	"Watch What Happens"	Demy, Gimbel, Michel Legrand	There Is A Time	2:41
5.	"One of Those Songs"	Calvi, Holt	There Is A Time	1:58
6.	"Days of the Waltz"	Jacques Brel, Holt	There Is A Time	4:19
7.	"Ay Marieke"	Jacques Brel, Jouannest	There Is A Time	2:36
8.	"Love at Last You Have Found Me"	Charles Aznavour, Worth	There Is A Time	2:38
9.	"I'll Build A Stairway to Paradise"	Buddy DeSylva, George Gershwin, Ira Gershwin	There Is A Time	2:08
10.	"See the Old Man"	John Kander, Fred Ebb	There Is A Time	1:22
11.	"The Parisians"	Alan Jay Lerner, Frederick Loewe	There Is A Time	2:01
12.	"One Summer Love"	Larry Stith, Richard Everitt	Single Release	2:16
13.	"How Much Will I Love You?"	Livingston, Evans	Single Release	2:34
14.	"Day Dreaming"	Bob Hilliard, Mort Garson	Single Release	2:35
15.	"His Woman"	Bob Hilliard, Mort Garson	Single Release	2:35
16.	"My Little Corner of the World"	Lee Pockriss, Bob Hilliard	Single Release	2:14
17.	"We'll Be Together"	M. Garson, B. Hilliard	Single Release	2:33
18.	"A Quiet Thing"	F. Ebb, J. Kander	Single Release	2:41
19.	"All I Need"	F. Ebb, J. Kander	Single Release	2:42
20.	"Sing Happy"	F. Ebb, J. Kander	Single Release	3:19
21.	"Dear Love"	F. Ebb, J. Kander	Single Release	2:42
22.	"I'm Not Laughing"	B. Crewe, R. Bondi	Single Release	2:50
23.	"Did I Hurt Your Feelings?"	Bob Crewe	Single Release	3:07
24.	"The Many Faces Of Love"	Mort Shuman, Doc Pomus	Single Release	2:17
25.	"At My Age"	F. Ebb, J. Kander	Single Release	3:08
26.	"Middle of the Street"	Christopher Allen, Richard Everitt, Peter Allen	Single Release	2:16
27.	"Everybody Loves My Baby"	Spencer Williams, Jack Palmer	Single Release	2:07
28.	"Marriage Is For Old Folks"	L. Carr, E. Shuman	Single Release	3:11
29.	"Come On And Baby Me"	Sam M. Lewis, Meyer, Young	Single Release	2:03
30.	"Say Liza" (Liza With A "Z")	F. Ebb, J. Kander	Single Release	3:41

== Personnel ==
Credits adapted from The Complete Capitol Collection CD.

- Executive producer (for Drg Records) – Hugh Fordin
- Liner notes – Scott Schechter
- Producer [for Drg Records] – Scott Schechter
