= Cabaret (soundtrack) =

Soundtrack album by Various artists
- Released: 1972
- Genres: Show tunes, traditional pop
- Label: ABC Records

Liza Minnelli chronology
Live at the Olympia in Paris (1972)	Cabaret (1972)	Liza with a Z (1972)

Cabaret is the soundtrack album to the 1972 film of the same name. Released by ABC Records in 1972, the album features music by John Kander with lyrics by Fred Ebb, performed by Liza Minnelli, Joel Grey, and the film's cast, with arrangements and musical supervision by Ralph Burns. The film, directed and choreographed by Bob Fosse, adapts the 1966 stage musical based on Christopher Isherwood's writings and is set in Berlin during the final years of the Weimar Republic.

The soundtrack includes songs presented primarily as performances at the Kit Kat Klub, alongside numbers such as "Tomorrow Belongs to Me" that are staged outside the nightclub. Upon release, the album received significant attention as part of the film's critical and commercial success in the United States and internationally.

== Background ==
The 1972 film Cabaret, directed and choreographed by Bob Fosse, is an adaptation of the 1966 stage musical by John Kander and Fred Ebb (itself derived from Christopher Isherwood's writings). Set in Berlin during the last years of the Weimar Republic, the film contrasts the bohemian world of the Kit Kat Klub with the rise of Nazism; Fosse relocated most musical numbers into the diegetic space of the nightclub, using them as ironic or distancing commentary on the narrative action. Cabaret opened in February 1972 to strong critical attention and box-office performance, and it was a major presence during the awards season, receiving ten Academy Award nominations and winning eight, including Best Director, Best Actress and Best Supporting Actor.

== Production and recording ==
The soundtrack production brought together the work of composer John Kander and lyricist Fred Ebb, with Minnelli commented in one interview that the combined talent of the team, including Fosse and Grey, contributed significantly to the project. The recording took place in Munich, Germany, in 1971, concurrently with the filming. The process was overseen by director Bob Fosse.

For Minnelli, a highlight in the soundtrack was the inclusion of "Maybe This Time", a song she had previously recorded on her first album, which Fosse decided to incorporate into the film. She said: "Another thing that worked well for me musically on Cabaret was that I had recorded a song on my first album [1964's Liza! Liza!], when I was a kid, called "Maybe This Time". Fosse finally put it in the movie, and I got to sing that. So it worked out nicely, except for the giggling. I also remember that it was very efficient, the recording. And we did everything properly because Fosse was like that, he wanted everything done right and precisely. He was brilliant, absolutely brilliant. Still, I was stunned that it became such a huge hit. Because you can never really know".

== Critical reception ==
Professional ratings
Review scores
Source	Rating
AllMusic	4.5/5 stars

Billboard wrote that the album includes some of "the most exciting transfers from stage to screen". Record World wrote that "no one can doubt the imminent success of this waxed effort" and predicted a "sure hit", adding that Liza Minnelli would "finally get the credit she so richly deserves". The Sarasota Herald-Tribune wrote that "the soundtrack of "Cabaret" is good listening from the beginning to the end".

In a retrospective review AllMusic wrote that "their [Minnelli and Grey] performances are outstanding, but the album as a whole is a bit skimpy", while noting it "contains some definitive Minnelli performances"..

== Commercial performance ==
The Cabaret original soundtrack album entered the Billboard 200 on March 18, 1972, at the #129 position, reaching its peak position at number 25 on June 9, 1973, and remaining on the chart for a total of 72 weeks. The album stayed on the Cash Box chart for 38 consecutive weeks, peaking at number 40, and later returned for an additional 27 weeks, reaching up to number 31.

According to a Billboard magazine report from August 24, 1974, the Cabaret soundtrack, appeared at a transitional moment in the music industry, when public interest was shifting from traditional show tunes toward rock and pop. The article noted that had the album been released a few years earlier, Cabaret might have reached sales of around one million copies (it had sold between 250,000 and 300,000 units by that date). The magazine reported on October 6, 1973, that the album had been certified Gold by the Recording Industry Association of America (RIAA ) for 500,000 copies shipped.

== Track listing ==
All tracks are written by John Kander and Fred Ebb.

Cabaret: Original Soundtrack Recording
No.	Title	Performer	Length
1.	"Willkommen"	Joel Grey	4:29
2.	"Mein Herr"	Liza Minnelli	3:36
3.	"Maybe This Time"	Liza Minnelli	3:11
4.	"Money, Money"	Joel Grey, Liza Minnelli	3:04
5.	"Two Ladies"	Joel Grey	3:11
6.	"Sitting Pretty"	Instrumental	2:27
7.	"Tomorrow Belongs to Me"	Mark Lambert	3:06
8.	"Tiller Girls"	Joel Grey	1:41
9.	"Heiraten (Married)"	Greta Keller	3:45
10.	"If You Could See Her"	Joel Grey	3:54
11.	"Cabaret"	Liza Minnelli	3:34
12.	"Finale"	Joel Grey	2:28
Total length:			38:14

== Personnel ==
Credits adapted from the liner notes of Cabaret LP (ABC Records, catalog no. ABCD 752).

- Directed and orchestrated by Ralph Burns
- Lyrics by Fred Ebb
- Music by John Kander

== Charts ==
Weekly charts for Cabaret
Chart (1973)	Peak position
Australia (Kent Music Report)	10
Canada Top Albums/CDs (RPM)	22
German Albums (Offizielle Top 100)	45
Italian Albums (Musica e dischi)	5
Spanish Albums (PROMUSICAE)	6
UK Albums (OCC)	13
United States (Billboard 200)	25
US Top 100 Albums (Cash Box)	31

== Certifications ==
Region	Certification	Certified units/sales
United States (RIAA)	Gold	500,000^{^}
^{^} Shipments figures based on certification alone.
