= The Dangerous Christmas of Red Riding Hood =

Soundtrack album by Various artists
- Released: November 1965
- Genres: Show tunes, traditional pop
- Label: ABC-Paramount

Liza Minnelli chronology
Live at the London Palladium (1965)	The Dangerous Christmas of Red Riding Hood (1965)	There Is a Time (1966)

The Dangerous Christmas of Red Riding Hood is the original cast album of the 1965 American Broadcasting Company (ABC) television musical of the same name. Created by Jule Styne and Bob Merrill, with a script by Robert Emmett, the special starred Liza Minnelli, Cyril Ritchard, Vic Damone, and The Animals. The album, produced by ABC-Paramount Records, was released shortly before the broadcast and features performances from the TV production, including numbers such as "My Red Riding Hood", "I'm Naive", and "Ding-a-Ling, Ding-a-Ling".

Critical reception praised the performances and the Styne-Merrill score, highlighting Minnelli's charm and the standout songs, though some reviewers noted that the album's slightly slower tempo reduced some of the broadcast's original vitality. While the special did not achieve high ratings at the time, its sophisticated satire and humor have since been appreciated by adult audiences.

== Background ==
ABC-Paramount announced in October 1965 the acquisition of the original cast album for the upcoming TV musical The Dangerous Christmas of Red Riding Hood. The special was conceived by the songwriting team of Jule Styne and Bob Merrill, who also served as its executive producers and provided the music and lyrics, with a script by Robert Emmett. The production was sponsored by the General Electric Company, which co-produced the accompanying album with Eritas Productions, Inc., with Richard Lewine as producer and Sid Smith as director. ABC-Paramount's president, Larry Newton, stated the label planned to release the album well before the television broadcast to give audiences "a musical preview of the show". The cast for this project included Cyril Ritchard, Liza Minnelli, Vic Damone, and the band The Animals as the Wolf Pack. The television musical aired on ABC on November 28, 1965, and was later released on DVD in 2007 by Substance Video (#12250).

As detailed by Martin Wimmer in his biography Clockwork Liza: Star and Artist: The Career Achievement of Liza Minnelli (2010), the album was recorded in October 1965 and released a month later by ABC-Paramount Records. In the musical, Minnelli, playing an eccentric Little Red Riding Hood, performed songs like "My Red Riding Hood" and "I'm Naive". She was joined by Cyril Ritchard (as the wolf) for "Ding-a-Ling, Ding-a-Ling and Granny", while Vic Damone (as the hunter) featured in "We Wish the World a Happy Yule". Wimmer describes "Ding-a-Ling, Ding-a-Ling" as the show's standout number, praising both the charm of the Styne-Merrill score and Minnelli's engaging performance.

== Release and promotion ==
ABC-Paramount Records scheduled the original cast album for release well in advance of the television special's November 28th airing, aiming to allow audiences to purchase the album before viewing the show. In its November 20, 1965 issue, Billboard listed the album in the "New Album Releases" section, which featured albums released that month in the United States. According to Cash Box (December 16, 1965), Festival Records rush-released the Australian soundtrack album. The label reportedly expected the songs "We Wish the World a Happy Yule", "My Riding Hood", and "Ding-a-ling, Ding-a-ling" to attract the most attention.

The promotion was full-scale and included the strategic release of four singles from the score ahead of the broadcast: "Red Riding Hood" and "I'm Naive" (both featuring Marily Michaels), "Along the Way" (with the Barry Sisters), and "Dingle Ling, Dingle Ling" (with Don Cornell).

== Critical reception ==
Professional ratings
Review scores
Source	Rating
AllMusic	2/5 stars

Record World (December 16, 1965) described the soundtrack as "a delightful musical score for the Thanksgiving special about Christmas and Red Riding Hood", highlighting Liza Minnelli as "the gal in the cape", Cyril Ritchard as "the man on the prowl", and Vic Damone as "a singing woodsman". The review noted that Damone introduced "the best song, 'Along the Way'".

Billboard praised the soundtrack, noting that the program featured "a spirited Jule Styne–Bob Merrill score" that placed the album "high among the Yule entries". The review highlighted performances by Ritchard, Minnelli, Damone, and The Animals, adding that the key song, "We Wish You a Happy Yule" could become a December standard.

According to Herbie J. Pilato, in Christmas TV Memories: Nostalgic Holiday Favorites of the Small Screen, although the album reproduces the musical content of the TV special, "the speed is a little slow and robs the music of its broadcast vitality".

== Track listing ==
The Dangerous Christmas of Red Riding Hood - Side A
No.	Title	Writer(s)	Performer(s)	Length
1.	"Overture"	Bob Merrill, Jule Styne	Orchestral	7:15
2.	"We Wish The World A Happy Yule" (The Wolf / Lone T. Wolf)	Bob Merrill, Jule Styne	Cyril Ritchard	2:04
3.	"My Red Riding Hood" (Red Riding Hood)	Bob Merrill, Jule Styne	Liza Minnelli	3:05
4.	"Snubbed" (The Wolf / Lone T. Wolf)	Bob Merrill, Jule Styne	Cyril Ritchard	2:05
5.	"Woodsman's Serenade; Granny's Gulch; Along The Way" (Red Riding Hood; The Woodsman)	Bob Merrill, Jule Styne	Liza Minnelli; Vic Damone	4:05
6.	"I'm Naive" (Red Riding Hood)	Bob Merrill, Jule Styne	Liza Minnelli	2:38

The Dangerous Christmas of Red Riding Hood - Side B
No.	Title	Writer(s)	Performer(s)	Length
1.	"Red Riding Hood Improvisation"	Bob Merrill, Jule Styne	Orchestral	4:05
2.	"I'm Naive (Reprise)" (The Wolf / Lone T. Wolf)	Bob Merrill, Jule Styne	Cyril Ritchard	2:42
3.	"We're Gonna Howl Tonight" (The Wolf Pack)	Bob Merrill, Jule Styne	The Animals	1:39
4.	"Ding-A-Ling, Ding-A-Ling" (Red Riding Hood; The Wolf / Lone T. Wolf)	Bob Merrill, Jule Styne	Liza Minnelli; Cyril Ritchard	2:15
5.	"Poor Mouse"	Bob Merrill, Jule Styne	Orchestral	4:05
6.	"Granny; Along The Way" (Red Riding Hood; The Wolf / Lone T. Wolf; The Woodsman)	Bob Merrill, Jule Styne	Liza Minnelli; Cyril Ritchard; Vic Damone	1:55
7.	"We Wish The World A Happy Yule (Finale)" (Red Riding Hood; The Wolf / Lone T. Wolf; The Woodsman)	Bob Merrill, Jule Styne	Liza Minnelli; Cyril Ritchard; Vic Damone	1:40

== Personnel ==
Credits adapted from The Dangerous Christmas Of Red Riding Hood 1965 LP.

- Arranged and conducted by Walter Scharf
- Choreography by Lee Theodore
- Chorus master [Choral direction] by Buster Davis
- Cover design [Liner] by ARW Productions, Inc.
- Directed by Sid Smith (2)
- Engineer by Bob Arnold
- Illustration by Bentz
- Liner notes by Rick Ward
- Lyrics by Bob Merrill
- Music by Jule Styne
- Other [Scenery & costumes] by Raoul Pene DuBois
- Producer by Richard Lewine
- Script by Robert Emmett
- Supervised by Bob Thiele
