= The Complete A&M Recordings =

Compilation album by Liza Minnelli
- Released: November 25, 2008
- Recorded: 1968–1972
- Genre: Jazz, traditional, country, soul
- Label: Collectors' Choice Music, Universal Music Special Markets

Liza Minnelli chronology
The Complete Capitol Collection (2006)	The Complete A&M Recordings (2008)	Liza's at The Palace.... (2009)

The Complete A&M Recordings is a compilation album by American singer and actor Liza Minnelli, released by the labels Collectors' Choice Music and Universal Music Special Markets. The album came out on November 25, 2008, a week before the singer headlined a short Broadway run titled Liza's at The Palace.... This comprehensive box set compiles all four albums Minnelli released with A&M Records between 1968 and 1972, alongside previously unreleased bonus tracks from those sessions.

The release commemorated the 40th anniversary of Minnelli's first A&M album and presented the remastered tracks in their first-ever complete CD release with their original track listings. It included a 16-page booklet with an essay by historian Scott Schechter, credits, and rare photographs. Critics reacted differently, while some reviewers praised the collection for showcasing a nuanced and often overlooked period in Minnelli's career, others were less impressed with the musical direction of the original albums.

== Album details ==
The compilation includes all four albums Minnelli released between 1968 and 1972 while signed to A&M Records: Liza Minnelli (1968), Come Saturday Morning (1969), New Feelin' (1970), and Live at the Olympia in Paris (1972). Additionally, it features tracks from the recording sessions of these albums that were not included in the final track listings. It marked the first time all four of Minnelli's aforementioned albums were made available on CD. While most tracks had been reissued on other CDs over the years, they had never been compiled as complete albums with their original track listings.

The album includes a 16-page booklet with an essay by author and historian Scott Schechter, along with credits and rare photos. The release celebrated the 40th anniversary of Minnelli's first album with A&M Records and features remastered and digitally restored tracks (in 24-bit resolution) sourced directly from the original master tapes.

== Release ==
The album came out on November 25, 2008, a week before the singer headlined a short Broadway run titled Liza's at The Palace.....

== Critical reception ==
Professional ratings
Review scores
Source	Rating
AllMusic	3/5 stars

John Bush of AllMusic noted that while the songs came from critically praised albums, they had failed to resonate commercially at the time of their original release. He wrote that Minnelli's A&M contract "gave her the chance to reinvent herself, and she dove in headfirst," awarding the compilation three out of five stars.

David Wiegand of CTInsider called the release "not only timely but invaluable for those who know her only from her post-Cabaret recordings." He praised Minnelli's "delicacy and subtlety" during this era, even in unconventional song choices like "Alicinha," which showcased her artistic individuality.

Steve Weinstein of Edge dismissed the tracks as "forgettable elevator music," lamenting that Minnelli was recording these songs (or "forced to record them?") at a time when artists like Janis Joplin, Joni Mitchell, and Laura Nyro were redefining women's roles in music.

PopMatters critic Steve Horowitz praised the compilation, suggesting it could be titled The Four Sides of Liza Minnelli due to the stylistic diversity of the four albums (two of which he deemed "excellent"). He noted that while the bonus tracks from Disc 1 didn't fully align with their original albums’ mood, they were still worthwhile, and praised the Disc 2 bonuses for their "more low-key fashion" performances.

On November 23, 2013, Playbill critic Ben Rimalower included The Complete A&M Recordings in his list of the twelve best albums of Liza Minnelli's career.

== Track listing ==
Disc one
No.	Title	Writer(s)	Original album	Length
1.	"The Debutante's Ball"	Randy Newman	Liza Minnelli	2:55
2.	"Happyland"	Newman	Liza Minnelli	2:26
3.	"The Look of Love"	Hal David, Burt Bacharach	Liza Minnelli	3:30
4.	"(The Tragedy Of) Butterfly McHeart"	Peter Allen, Chris Allen	Liza Minnelli	2:19
5.	"Waiting for my Friend"	John Addison, George Melly	Liza Minnelli	2:49
6.	"Married / You Better Sit Down Kids"	Fred Ebb, John Kander / Sonny Bono	Liza Minnelli	4:56
7.	"So Long Dad"	Newman	Liza Minnelli	2:07
8.	"For No One"	John Lennon, Paul McCartney	Liza Minnelli	2:28
9.	"My Mammy"	Sam M. Lewis, Joe Young, Walter Donaldson	Liza Minnelli	3:03
10.	"The Happy Time"	Ebb, Kander	Liza Minnelli	2:46
11.	"Snow"	Randy Newman		2:30
12.	"Alcinha"	Luiz Henrique, Oscar Brown Jr		3:20
13.	"Once in a Lifetime"	Luiz Henrique, Walter Wanderley		3:55
14.	"Listen to Me"	Luiz Henrique		4:26
15.	"I'm Looking Over a Four Leaf Clover"	Mort Dixon, Harry Woods		2:17
16.	"Come Saturday Morning"	Fred Karlin, Dory Previn	Come Saturday Morning	1:45
17.	"Raggedy Ann & Raggedy Andy"	Larry Marks, Marilyn & Alan Bergman	Come Saturday Morning	3:30
18.	"Leavin' On A Jet Plane"	John Denver	Come Saturday Morning	3:14
19.	"Wailing of the Willow"	Harry Nilsson	Come Saturday Morning	2:01
20.	"Nevertheless"	Bert Kalmar, Harry Ruby	Come Saturday Morning	2:55
21.	"Wherefore And Why"	Gordon Lightfoot	Come Saturday Morning	2:32
22.	"Love Story"	Randy Newman	Come Saturday Morning	2:21
23.	"On A Slow Boat To China"	Frank Loesser	Come Saturday Morning	3:19
24.	"Don't Let Me Lose This Dream"	Aretha Franklin, Ted White	Come Saturday Morning	2:59
25.	"Simon"	Peter Allen	Come Saturday Morning	3:09
26.	"MacArthur Park / Didn't We?"	Jimmy Webb	Come Saturday Morning	4:03

Disc two
No.	Title	Writer(s)	Original album	Length
1.	"Love for Sale" (From the musical The New Yorkers)	Cole Porter	New Feelin'	2:36
2.	"Stormy Weather"	Harold Arlen, Ted Koehler	New Feelin'	2:42
3.	"Come Rain Or Come Shine" (From the film St. Louis Woman)	Harold Arlen, Johnny Mercer	New Feelin	3:10
4.	"Lazy Bones"	Johnny Mercer, Hoagy Carmichael	New Feelin	2:32
5.	"Can't Help Lovin' That Man Of Mine"	Oscar Hammerstein, Jerome Kern	New Feelin	2:37
6.	"I Wonder Where My Easy Rider's Gone"	Shelton Brooks	New Feelin	2:59
7.	"The Man I Love" (From the musical Strike Up the Band)	George Gershwin, Ira Gershwin	New Feelin	2:47
8.	"How Long Has This Been Going On?" (From Funny Face and Rosalie)	George Gershwin, Ira Gershwin	New Feelin	3:02
9.	"God Bless The Child"	Billie Holiday, Arthur Herzog	New Feelin	3:31
10.	"Maybe This Time"	Fred Ebb, John Kander	New Feelin	3:16
11.	"Frank Mills" (From the musical Hair)	Galt MacDermot, Gerome Ragni, James Rado		2:59
12.	"I'll Never Fall in Love Again" (From the musical Promises, Promises)	Burt Bacharach, Hal David		2:19
13.	"This Girl's in Love with You"	Burt Bacharach, Hal David		4:21
14.	"Tell Me That You Love Me, Junie Moon"	Peter Allen		3:16
15.	"Consider Yourself / Hello, I Love You / I Gotta Be Me / Consider Yourself (Reprise)"	Lionel Bart / John Densmore, Robby Krieger, Ray Manzarek, Jim Morrison / Walter Marks / Bart	Live at the Olympia in Paris	3:06
16.	"Everybody's Talkin' / Good Morning Starshine"	Fred Neil / James Rado, Gerome Ragni, Galt MacDermot	Live at the Olympia in Paris	3:29
17.	"God Bless The Child"	Billie Holiday, Arthur Herzog	Live at the Olympia in Paris	3:20
18.	"Liza With A 'Z'"	Fred Ebb, John Kander	Live at the Olympia in Paris	3:46
19.	"Married / You Better Sit Down Kids"	Fred Ebb, John Kander / Sonny Bono	Live at the Olympia in Paris	4:57
20.	"Nous On S'Aimera"	Frank Gerald, Claude Bolling	Live at the Olympia in Paris	2:15
21.	"I Will Wait For You"	Norman Gimbel, Michel Legrand	Live at the Olympia in Paris	3:40
22.	"There Is A Time (Les Temps)"	Charles Aznavour, Jeff Davis, Gene Lees	Live at the Olympia in Paris	2:31
23.	"My Mammy"	Sam M. Lewis, Joe Young, Walter Donaldson	Live at the Olympia in Paris	3:18
24.	"Everybody Loves My Baby"	Jack Palmer, Spencer Williams	Live at the Olympia in Paris	2:23
25.	"Cabaret" (From the Broadway musical Cabaret)	Fred Ebb, John Kander	Live at the Olympia in Paris	4:29

== Personnel ==
Credits adapted from The Complete A&M Recordings CD.

- Producer: Scott Schachter
- Executive Producer: Gordon Anderson
- Project Design: Claire Morales
- Priority supplied by: Nancy Barr-Brandon, Avi Duvdevani, Scott Schachter, Rayburn Sparks, and Steve Warren
- Original Remastered in 24-bit by: Ellen Fitton at Universal Maximum Studios East, NYC
