= Liza's Back =

Live album by Liza Minnelli
- Released: October 29, 2002
- Recorded: April 2, 2002; Beacon Theatre, New York City
- Genre: Traditional pop, jazz
- Length: 73:20
- Label: J
- Producer: David Gest

Liza Minnelli chronology
Life Is a Cabaret! (2002)	Liza's Back (2002)	When It Comes Down To It.......1968–1977 (2004)

Liza's Back is the ninth live album by American singer and actress Liza Minnelli, released by J Records in 2002. The album captures her comeback following a two-year hiatus caused by a diagnosis of viral encephalitis. This return was marked by a series of sold-out concerts at New York's Beacon Theatre, conceived by her husband, David Gest, and came after high-profile performances at London's Royal Albert Hall and Yankee Stadium after 9/11.

Recorded during these shows, the album was produced by Phil Ramone and executive produced by Clive Davis, marking Minnelli's reunion with the music executive. It features a setlist of her classics, including "Cabaret", and "Theme from New York, New York" alongside the new titular anthem of resilience, "Liza's Back", written by her long-time collaborators John Kander and Fred Ebb. The release was met with favorable reviews from critics, who praised her reinvigorated vocal power and the infectious joy she brought to the performance.

== Production and recording ==
After her performance at the Royal Albert Hall in London and her nationally televised rendition of "New York, New York" at the Yankee Stadium following the September 11 attacks in the United States, Liza Minnelli embarked on a series of comeback concerts. These comeback shows were conceived and produced by her husband, David Gest, marking the end of a two-year hiatus she took due to a diagnosis of viral encephalitis, a potentially fatal illness.

The album's recordings took place on April 2, 2002, at the beginning of summer, during a week of sold-out shows at the Beacon Theatre in New York. Minnelli performed many songs associated with her and introduced Liza's Back, written by her long-time collaborators John Kander and Fred Ebb.

The album was produced by Phil Ramone and marked Minnelli's reunion with Clive Davis, the president of J Records, who had signed her to Columbia Records in the early 1970s. The tracklist includes 18 songs such as "Cabaret," "Don't Smoke in Bed," "Something Wonderful," and "New York, New York". Minnelli and Ramone had previously worked together on her 1972 album Liza with a Z. The television special of the same name directed by Bob Fosse that year earned the artist and the director an Emmy award.

Among the new songs is Liza's Back, which was described by some sections of the press as an anthem of triumph. The lyrics of the song go: "I took my pill bottles and threw them away / I emptied the alcohol, went back to AA / Hey, Broadway... Liza's back!".

The release was preceded by a party held at the Equitable Auditorium in New York City, organized by Clive Davis.

== Critical reception ==
Professional ratings
Review scores
Source	Rating
AllMusic	3/5 stars
Uncut	1.5/5 stars

Critical reviews from music critics were favorable. William Ruhlmann of AllMusic wrote that Minnelli "sounds much better than she did on Minnelli on Minnelli: Live at the Palace, a recording that showed vocal deterioration in her breath control and an unsteady vibrato". He said that while the first part of the show features forgettable songs by Kander and Ebb, there is an excellent performance of "Something Wonderful" and the standout track "Never Never Land" that features a chorus from her mother Judy Garland's iconic song, "Over the Rainbow".

Morag Reavley of BBC Music wrote that after a series of personal experiences, the songs seemed to have been endowed with new meaning, and that Liza Minnelli's "performance is imbued with an infectious sense of joy in her newly textured and more vigorous vocal abilities, while her conversations with the audience alternate between cheeky and affectionate".

== Track listing ==
No.	Title	Writer(s)	Length
1.	"Liza's Back"	John Kander, Fred Ebb	3:12
2.	"Something Wonderful"	Richard Rodgers, Oscar Hammerstein II	6:07
3.	"Cry"	Churchill Kohlman	2:05
4.	"Don't Cry Out Loud"	Peter Allen, Carole Bayer Sager	2:13
5.	"Crying"	Joe Melson, Roy Orbison	3:38
6.	"City Lights"	John Kander, Fred Ebb	5:23
7.	"Don't Smoke in Bed"	Willard Robison	5:07
8.	"Some People"	Jule Styne, Stephen Sondheim	3:42
9.	"Never Never Land / Over the Rainbow"	Jule Styne, Betty Comden, Adolph Green / Harold Arlen, Yip Harburg	3:44
10.	"What Did I Have That I Don't Have?"	Burton Lane, Alan Jay Lerner	4:43
11.	"Rose's Turn"	Jule Styne, Stephen Sondheim	5:05
12.	"Mein Herr"	John Kander, Fred Ebb	5:34
13.	"Money, Money"	John Kander, Fred Ebb	1:33
14.	"Maybe This Time"	John Kander, Fred Ebb	3:19
15.	"Cabaret"	John Kander, Fred Ebb	5:12
16.	"But the World Goes 'Round"	John Kander, Fred Ebb	4:30
17.	"Theme from New York City"	John Kander, Fred Ebb	5:41
18.	"I'll Be Seeing You"	Sammy Fain, Irving Kahal	2:32

Note: track times include on stage dialogue between songs.

== Personnel ==
Credits adapted from Liza's Back CD (J Records, catalog no. 80813-20045-2)

Liza's Band*

- Bill Lavorgna – musical conductor and drums
- Joey Melotti – musical director, arranger and synth
- Tom Barney – bass
- Michael Bearden – piano
- Michael Aarons – guitar
- Mark Sherman – percussion
- Dann Kahn – trumpet 1
- Ron Buttacavoli – trumpet 2
- Clinton Sharman – trombone
- Gerry Niewood – alto sax, flute and clarinet
- Frank Perowsky – tenor sax, flute and clarinet
- Ed Xiques – baritone sax, bass clarinet, flute and clarinet

Production

- Produced by Phil Ramone
- Co-produced by David Gest
- Executive producer: Clive Davis
- Remote recording: Dave Hewitt at Remote Recording Services, Buckingham, PA
- Mixed by Eric Schilling
- Additional engineering: Eric Schilling & Larry Alexander
- ProTools operators: Ken Freeman, Larry Alexander & Andreas Meyer
- Production manager for David Gest Productions, Inc.: Steve Benenav
- Production manager & contractor for Phil Ramone, Inc.: Jill Dell’Abate
- Audio post: Sue Pelino
- Assistant engineers: Pablo Arraya, Jamie Duncan, Paul Gregory, Michael McCoy, Claudius Mittendorfer, Flip Osman, Matt Snedecor, David Swope & Chris Testa
- Additional recording at Right Track Studios, NYC & Sony Studios, NYC
- Mixed at Right Track Studios, NYC & The Hit Factory, NYC
- Mastered by Greg Calbi at Sterling Sound, NYC

Public relations

- Mr. Warren Cowan and Mr. Richard Hoffman of Warren Cowan and Associates
- Phil Symes and David Freed of Warren Cowan/Phil Symes and Associates

Additional credits

- Hairstylists: Kristen Foster, Scott Ferreira of Giuseppe Franco Salon
- Legal representation: Judge Franklin Weissberg of Morrison, Cohen, Singer & Weinstein LLP; Joel Weinstein of Epstein, Levinsohn, Bodine, Hurwitz & Weinstein, PC
- Security: Willie Green
- Director of Operations: M’Hammed Soumayah
- Stylist: Ann Caruso
- New material by Fred Ebb & John Kander
- Original Broadway production *Liza’s Back* created and produced by David Gest
