= Stairway to Paradise =

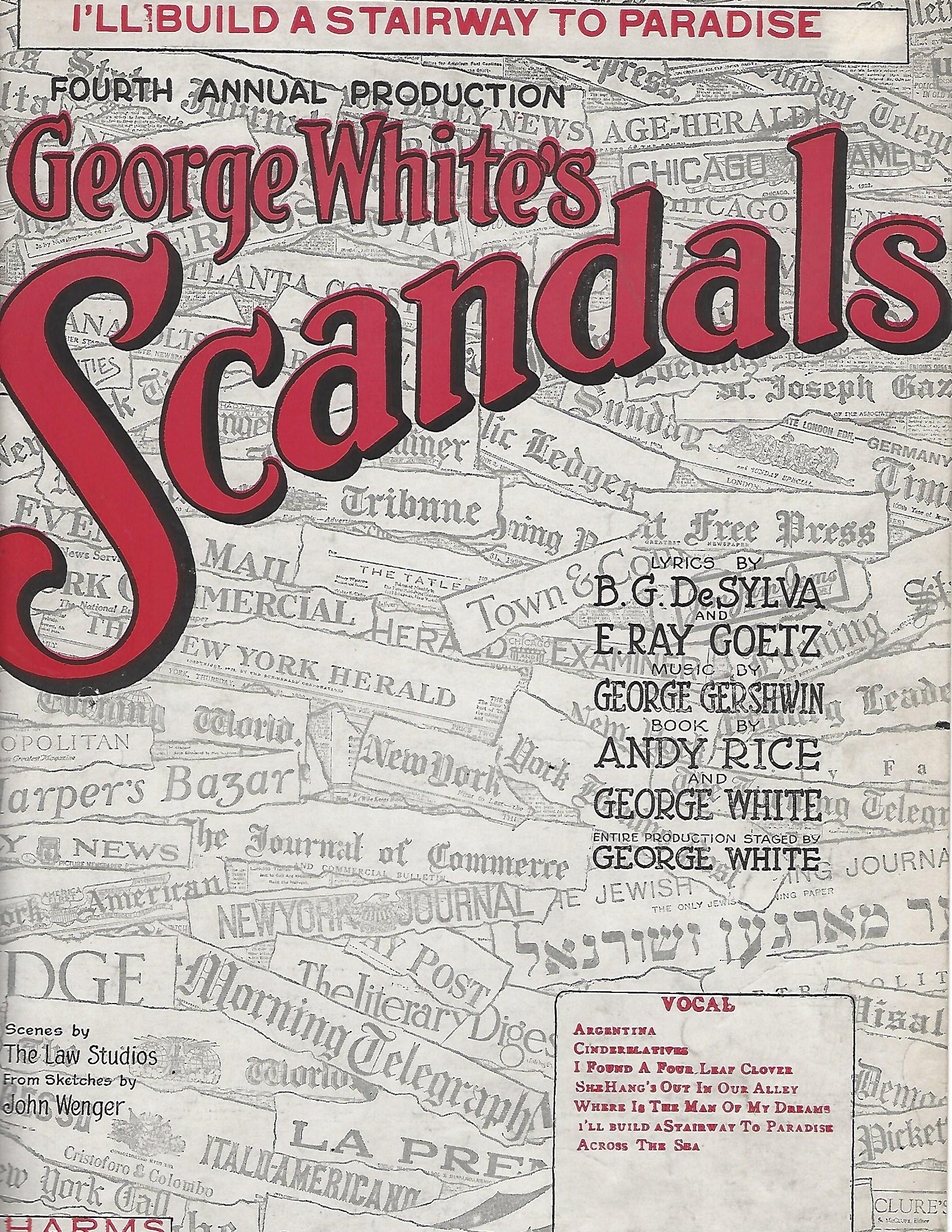

Song
- Language: English
- Published: 1922
- Genre: Broadway song
- Composer: George Gershwin
- Lyricists: Ira Gershwin (written under pen name Arthur Francis) and Buddy DeSylva (publishing under pen name B.G. DeSylva)

Audio sample
- Recording of I'll Build A Stairway to Paradise, performed by Markels' Orchestra (1922): file; help

"Stairway to Paradise", also known as "I'll Build a Stairway to Paradise", is a song composed in 1922 by George Gershwin with lyrics by Ira Gershwin (under the name Arthur Francis) and Buddy DeSylva (under the name of B. G. De Sylva) for the Broadway revue George White's Scandals. Popular recordings in 1922–23 were by Carl Fenton, Paul Whiteman, and Ben Selvin.

== Background ==
The lyrics make it clear that the "steps" on the stairway are dance steps.

== Other recordings ==
- Sarah Vaughan – Sarah Vaughan Sings George Gershwin (1958)
- Pat Boone on his 1958 album Yes Indeed!
- Frankie Vaughan – Frankie Vaughan at the London Palladium (1959).
- Liza Minnelli – There Is a Time (1966)
- Joel Grey – Only the Beginning (1967).
- Featured on the tribute album The Glory of Gershwin (1994), a compilation of Gershwin tunes produced by "Fifth Beatle" George Martin to honour Larry Adler, a lifelong friend of Gershwin, on his 80th birthday. Issy Van Randwyck performs the song.
- Mark Murphy with the Metropole Orchestra - The Dream (1995)
- Michael Feinstein – Michael & George: Feinstein Sings Gershwin (1998)
- Nancy Sinatra on her 2013 album Shifting Gears.
- Michael Ball and Alfie Boe – Together (2016)
- Harpers Bizarre – The Secret Life of Harpers Bizarre (1968)

== Popular culture ==
- In the 1951 American film musical An American in Paris it was performed by Georges Guétary, where it was entitled "I'll Build a Stairway to Paradise".
- The song is heard in the 2004 Howard Hughes biopic The Aviator, being sung by Rufus Wainwright, in a scene at the Cocoanut Grove night club set in 1927.
