= There Is a Time =

Studio album by Liza Minnelli
- Released: November 21, 1966
- Recorded: April–May 1966
- Studio: Capitol, New York City
- Genre: Pop; vocal; traditional
- Label: Capitol
- Producer: Marvin Holtzman

Liza Minnelli chronology
The Dangerous Christmas of Red Riding Hood (1965)	There Is a Time (1966)	Liza Minnelli (1968)

Singles from There Is a Time
- 1. "I Who Have Nothing" Released: October 24, 1966

There Is a Time is the third studio album by American singer and actress Liza Minnelli, released by Capitol Records in November 1966. The album marked her final collaboration with the label and followed her growing success on Broadway and in television. Conceived during a period when Minnelli was establishing herself as both a stage and nightclub performer, the project reflected an effort to refine her musical direction within a shifting popular music landscape.

The album is notable for its focus on French repertoire, with selections from Charles Aznavour, Jacques Brel, and Michel Legrand, complemented by other European songs and standards with French associations. Arranged and conducted by Ray Ellis, the sessions took place at Capitol’s New York studio in the spring of 1966. Despite critical attention at the time of release, the album did not appear on any charts, though it received an "honorable mention" from HiFi/Stereo Review in its 1967 Record of the Year Awards and has since been reissued in various formats, including remastered editions in the 2000s.

== Background ==
By the time she began work on her third album, Liza Minnelli's career had transformed dramatically since her debut. In the 21 months between albums, she had become a Broadway star, winning a Tony Award for Flora the Red Menace, launched a successful nightclub act, and starred in a television special. However, her recording career had not yet found commercial traction, with her previous albums performing moderately. Signed to Capitol Records, she was initially positioned as a successor to her mother, Judy Garland, and a rival to Barbra Streisand, but the mid-60s music landscape, dominated by the British Invasion, presented a significant challenge for a performer of her style.

== Production and recording ==
For There Is a Time, Minnelli shifted her musical direction, creating what would be characterized as her "French album". She moved on from arranger Peter Matz, who had worked on her first two albums, and hired Ray Ellis, who was concurrently Barbra Streisand's arranger. Together, they curated a repertoire focused predominantly on the works of seminal French songwriters like Charles Aznavour, Jacques Brel, and Michel Legrand. The selection also included the Italian song "I (Who Have Nothing)" and standards with French connections, such as "I'll Build a Stairway to Paradise".

The recordings took place at Capitol's studio in New York from April to May 2, 1966. The production is by Marvin Holtzman, and the arrangements and conducting are by Ray Ellis. Minnelli recorded songs by Jacques Brel years before the Off-Broadway revue Jacques Brel is Alive and Well and Living in Paris would popularize his work in America. Furthermore, the song "M'Lord" was noted for sounding like a clear precursor to "Mein Herr," which John Kander and Fred Ebb would later write for her iconic role in the film Cabaret.

== Release details ==
The release took place under the label of Capitol Records in November 1966, being her last one to be released by the record company.

On November 5, 1966, the Billboard magazine included it in the list of releases for that month. As a form of promotion, a single was sent to the radios. It included the songs "I Who Have Nothing" and "Middle Of The Street," with the first song originally being recorded in Italian.

In 2006, DRG Records released The Complete Capitol Collection compact disc (CD), which featured the album remixed and remastered in 24-bit from the original multi-track session tapes. According to producer Scott Schechter, this process removed a layer of reverb present on the original vinyl, resulting in a cleaner, warmer, and brighter sound that gives Liza's voice greater presence, as if she were singing directly to the listener in the same room.

In 2009, EMI Gold included the album in the double-CD compilation titled Finest (catalog no. 50999 6 98870 2 4). The tracks from this album were mastered from the original two-track stereo tapes used by Capitol to produce the vinyl records, with the goal of presenting the recordings in a digital format exactly as they were originally released.

== Critical reception ==
Professional ratings
Review scores
Source	Rating
AllMusic	3.5/5 stars

Billboard magazine, in a contemporary review, highlighted the album as Minnelli's "most powerful album entry to date," noting that it signaled the artist had "come of age." The review praised the high quality of the vocal performances and arrangements, particularly citing the "exceptionally moving" rendition of "The Days of the Waltz" and the "rousing" "One of Those Songs." The publication concluded that the album was "definitely a winner—artistically and commercially."

Rex Reed of HiFi/Stereo Review hailed it as the album where Liza Minnelli fully matured into "one of the most brilliant performers of the century." He praised her newfound vocal control and the emotional depth she brought to the material, noting that the heartbreak in her voice felt authentic, as she "brings a new balance and a new control that were sadly lacking before." Reed was profoundly moved by the album, stating that he played it "ten times before I was able to summon any kind of decorum that would allow me to write about it without total hysteria." He singled out her performances on "I Who Am Nothing" and "See the Old Man" as particularly heartbreaking, and described the arrangements by Ray Ellis as "stunningly brilliant." Ultimately, Reed concluded that "what Liza gives to her audience is the best in herself," calling the album a "colossal triumph."

In a review for High Fidelity, Morgan Ames conceded that Liza Minnelli appeared to be "singing a little better" on this album, with "a bit less gasping [and] grating than usual," a improvement possibly influenced by her association with Charles Aznavour. However, the critic contended that she still had not gotten "all the way through a song without giving it a punch in the belly" and expressed doubt that she understood what she was singing about. The review concluded with a skeptical, "But something's stirring. Let's see where she is five albums from now."

Record World noted the album's "très français" character, with its selections of songs by Charles Aznavour, Jacques Brel, and Michel Legrand, and wrote that Minnelli "gets her vowels and consonants in an uproar on this package," concluding that "Liza's fans are growing."

The St. Petersburg Times, in a review written by Chick Ober, praised There Is a Time as clear proof that Liza Minnelli was emerging as more than just Judy Garland's daughter, noting her fiery vocal talent and growing maturity as a performer. Ober emphasized that Minnelli was establishing herself as a star in her own right and highlighted several standout numbers from the album, particularly "Stairway to Paradise," "There Is a Time," "One of Those Songs," and "Watch What Happens."

In a retrospective review, William Ruhlmann of AllMusic considered There Is a Time a high-quality album, arguing that its "French" repertoire was perfectly suited to Minnelli's romantic and bravura style. He concluded that, the performance by the 20-year-old singer was that of an "old pro" on a well-chosen set of songs.

== Awards ==
In its 1967 Record of the Year Awards, HiFi/Stereo Review granted an "Honorable Mention" to Liza Minnelli for her album There Is a Time in the popular category, which was awarded to Mireille Mathieu's The Fabulous New French Singing Star album (Atlantic, catalog no. 8127). The prize recognized purely artistic achievements, selected by the magazine's critics based on the intrinsic merit of the works, independent of commercial success. The results were published in the February 1968 issue of the magazine.

Awards and nominations for There Is a Time
Year	Organization	Award	Result	Ref.
1967	Hi-Fi/Stereo Review	Record of the Year	Honorable Mention	

== Commercial performance ==
The album did not appear on any charts, and contemporary sources have attributed this to the dominance of rock and roll among American record buyers at the time.

== Track listing ==
There Is a Time
No.	Title	Writer(s)	Length
1.	"There Is a Time (Le Temps)"	Gene Lees, Charles Aznavour, Jeff Davis	2:15
2.	"I (Who Have Nothing)"	Jerry Leiber, Mike Stoller, Mogol, Carlo Donida	2:40
3.	"M'Lord"	Marguerite Monnot, Georges Moustaki	2:26
4.	"Watch What Happens ("Husband theme" from The Umbrellas of Cherbourg)"	Jacques Demy, Norman Gimbel, Michel Legrand	2:33
5.	"One of Those Songs"	Gerard Calvi, Will Holt	2:00
6.	"Days of the Waltz"	Jacques Brel, Will Holt	3:09
7.	"Ay Marieke"	Jacques Brel, Gérard Jouannest	2:40
8.	"Love at Last You Have Found Me (J'en Deduis Que Je T'aime)"	Charles Aznavour, Johnny Worth	3:30
9.	"I'll Build a Stairway to Paradise"	Buddy DeSylva, George Gershwin, Ira Gershwin	2:07
10.	"See the Old Man"	John Kander, Fred Ebb	2:00
11.	"The Parisians"	Alan Jay Lerner, Frederick Loewe	2:00

There Is a Time – Digital album bonus tracks
No.	Title	Writer(s)	Length
12.	"Middle of the Street" (Capitol single B-side #5761)	C. Allen, D. Everitt, P. Allen	2:15
13.	"The Many Faces of Love"	Doc Pomus, Mort Shuman	2:16
14.	"At My Age"	John Kander, Fred Ebb	3:07
15.	"Everybody Loves My Baby"	Spencer Williams, Jack Palmer	2:06
16.	"Marriage Is for Old Folks"	Leon N. Carr; Earl Shuman	3:10
17.	"Come On and Baby Me"	Samy M. Lewis, Meyer, Young	2:02
18.	"Say Liza (Liza With a "Z")"	J. Kander, F. Ebb	3:40

== Personnel ==
Credits adapted from liner notes of There Is a Time LP (Capitol, catalog no. ST-2448).

- Arranged By, Conductor – Ray Ellis
- Liner Notes – Charles Aznavour
- Producer – Marvin Holtzman
