= 1970 Academy Awards =

1970 Academy Awards may refer to:

- 42nd Academy Awards, ceremony that took place in 1970 honoring 1969's films
- 43rd Academy Awards, the 1971 ceremony honoring the best in film for 1970
