= Live at the Olympia in Paris =

Live album by Liza Minnelli
- Released: April 1972
- Recorded: 11 & 13 December 1969
- Venue: Olympia, Paris
- Genres: Pop, vocal, traditional pop
- Label: A&M
- Producer: Larry Marks

Liza Minnelli chronology
New Feelin' (1970)	Live at the Olympia in Paris (1972)	Cabaret (1972)

Live at the Olympia in Paris is the second live album by American singer and actress Liza Minnelli, released in 1972 on A&M Records label. The recordings were made during her concerts at the Olympia theater in Paris in December 1969, where she performed a program that mixed contemporary pop songs with established standards. The album was produced and arranged by Larry Marks, with orchestral direction by Jack French, and included contributions in art direction and photography that reflected the atmosphere of the live performance.

The release marked Minnelli's final project with A&M Records and her second live recording following Live at the London Palladium (1965). Initially issued in markets such as France, Australia, and Japan before reaching the United States, the album never received a domestic CD edition. However, its track list and cover art were later made available through reissues, most notably in the 2008 collection The Complete A&M Recordings.

== Production and recording ==
The recordings took place over two nights at the prestigious Olympia theater in Paris. This was the second time Minnelli had performed at the venue, following her shows in 1966 at the International Festival of Variety Shows. The set list includes songs similar to the one she had been performing for the past four years, a mix of contemporary songs of the time and standards.

Most of the songs came from the concert on December 11, 1969, but some selections were replaced with those from the concert on December 13. The album was produced and arranged by Larry Marks; the orchestra was conducted by Jack French; the art direction was by Roland Young; the photography was by Guy Webster; and color technique was by Sandra Darnley.

The album does not represent the complete show. There were other songs, including a French version of "All I Need Is The Boy," the song "Where Did You Learn To Dance?," and an instrumental track, but the record label deemed it commercially unfeasible to release a double album with all the songs from the performance, and they were erased from their archives.

In 2011, Minnelli would return to the same venue for new performances.

== Release ==
Live at the Olympia in Paris marks Minnelli's fourth and final release of original material for the A&M Records and her second live album in her discography, following the release of Live at the London Palladium in 1965. The release was primarily due to contractual obligations. The recording had been stored for a considerable period before finally being released. France, Australia, and Japan received the album before the United States did. A&M Records, with a perspective that underestimated the potential audience interest at the time, kept it on the sidelines. During this period, the singer had achieved two notable successes, her role in the film musical Cabaret and her U.S. television special Liza with a Z. These works and their positive reception from the public prompted the label to release one final Minnelli album at that time.

The album was never released on compact disc (CD) in the United States, but it briefly had an overseas CD edition. The songs and their original track listing (as well as the album cover in the booklet) were included as part of the 2008 collection The Complete A&M Recordings. The album cover photo was used on the reissue of The Liza Minnelli Foursider titled A&M Gold Series. The reissue includes five tracks from Live at the Olympia in Paris.

== Critical reception ==
Professional ratings
Review scores
Source	Rating
Allmusic	4/5 stars
HiFi Stereo Review	Performance: Lusty; Recording: Excellent

The critic from Billboard magazine wrote that Minnelli's electrifying performance at the Paris show was captured effectively in the album recording. They highlighted songs such as "I Will Wait for You", "There is a Time", "Nous On S'Aimera", and "Cabaret", the latter of which he said concluded an excellent concert.

Rex Reed of HiFi Stereo Review wrote that the repertoire was tired, and Minnelli's voice was as well. He stated that the work fell short of its studio-recorded predecessor, and most of the songs had better recordings on previous albums. He concluded the review by saying, "I hope this album serves only to bridge the gap between past achievements and better things to come. Otherwise, Liza might as well follow in the footsteps of Marlene Dietrich, who inspired one of Judy Garland's favorite stories: 'She insisted I listen to her new album,' Judy said, winking. 'It was two perfectly recorded sides of applause!'"

In August 1972, Morgan Ames of High Fidelity wrote that "there's no denying it: Miss Minnelli has become one of the most electric performers of any time", a quality clearly reflected in the album.

Record World described the album as especially rewarding because it captures an entire show, performed partly in French but mostly in English. The review also pointed out that, although comparisons to her mother Judy Garland were inevitable, Minnelli's performance stood on its own.

In a contemporary review William Ruhlmann of AllMusic wrote that the album's repertoire "is a curious mix of old pop standards and current pop/rock material (...) sewn together by the performer's own enthusiasm." According to Ruhlmann, Minnelli is "so lively and animated that she simply overcomes all the contradictions and even pleases an audience that must be as shocked as she is by her French accent".

== Track listing ==
- Adapted from the 1973 Australian release of Liza Live (A&M Records – L 37660).

Live at the Olympia in Paris
No.	Title	Writer(s)	Length
1.	"Consider Yourself / Hello, I Love You / I Gotta Be Me / Consider Yourself (Reprise)"	Lionel Bart, John Densmore, Robby Krieger, Ray Manzarek, Jim Morrison, Walter Marks	2:57
2.	"Everybody's Talkin' / Good Morning Starshine"	Fred Neil, James Rado, Gerome Ragni, Galt MacDermot	3:20
3.	"God Bless the Child"	Billie Holiday, Arthur Herzog	3:09
4.	"Liza with A 'Z'"	Fred Ebb, John Kander	3:30
5.	"Married / You Better Sit Down Kids"	Fred Ebb, John Kander, Sonny Bono	4:45
6.	"Nous On S'Aimera / We Will Love One Another"	Frank Gerald, Claude Bolling	1:50
7.	"I Will Wait for You"	Norman Gimbel, Michel Legrand	3:20
8.	"There Is a Time (Les Temps)"	Charles Aznavour, Jeff Davis, Gene Lees	2:13
9.	"My Mammy"	Sam M. Lewis, Joe Young, Walter Donaldson	3:04
10.	"Everybody Loves My Baby"	Jack Palmer, Spencer Williams	1:45
11.	"Cabaret (from the Broadway musical Cabaret)"	Fred Ebb, John Kander	4:26
Total length:			32:39

== Personnel ==
- Produced & Arranged by Larry Marks
- Orchestra directed by Jack French
- Art Director: Roland Young
- Photography: Guy Webster
- Color Technique: Sandra Darnley
