= Come Saturday Morning (Liza Minnelli album) =

Studio album by Liza Minnelli
- Released: 1969 (FRA); January 26, 1970 (US)
- Recorded: August 1968, Los Angeles and November 1968, New York City
- Genres: Pop, vocal, traditional
- Length: 32:06
- Label: A&M
- Producer: Larry Marks

Liza Minnelli chronology
Liza Minnelli (1968)	Come Saturday Morning (1969)	New Feelin' (1970)

Singles from Come Saturday Morning
- 1. "Love Story" Released: February 13, 1970

Come Saturday Morning (released in the UK as Introducing Liza Minnelli) is the fifth studio album by American singer and actress Liza Minnelli. It was released in 1969 by A&M Records, and marked her second project with the label. The record continued the stylistic shift she had begun on her previous album, moving away from Broadway standards toward contemporary pop, soft rock, and singer-songwriter material.

The album appeared shortly after Minnelli's breakthrough as a film actress in The Sterile Cuckoo (1969), for which she received an Academy Award nomination for Best Actress. Its title song, originally performed by the Sandpipers on the film's soundtrack, was also nominated for Best Original Song at the 1970 Oscars, bringing added attention to the release.

Although Come Saturday Morning did not chart, Cash Box reported that it was receiving excellent advance orders in Canada. The album was well received by critics, who praised Minnelli's interpretations of both contemporary material and older standards. In 2008, the complete tracklist in the original order was included in the compilation The Complete A&M Recordings.

== Background ==
Around 1969, the music industry was undergoing changes in public taste regarding music. The Broadway songs for which Liza Minnelli was known were usually overshadowed by popular artists' productions by record labels, prioritizing music genres like rock and artists like John Lennon, Paul McCartney, Burt Bacharach, and Hal David. In this changing context, Liza Minnelli began to change her repertoire. In her self-titled previous release, she recorded songs by artists like Randy Newman and Sonny Bono. Despite this, Liza Minnelli album did not achieve commercial success, making the record label hesitant to release albums by the singer.

With the success of songs from the rock musical Hair in 1969 (such as "Aquarius/Let the Sunshine In" by 5th Dimension), A&M decided to have Minnelli record the song "Frank Mills" from the soundtrack and released it as a standalone single, but it also did not achieve success. Subsequently, Minnelli landed the lead role in the film The Sterile Cuckoo, which premiered in October 1969. The theme song, "Come Saturday Morning," was performed on the soundtrack by the group Sandpipers. When the nominations for the 1970 Oscars were announced in early 1970, Minnelli received a nomination for Best Actress, and "Come Saturday Morning" was nominated for Best Original Song, leading the record label to believe that it was finally the right time to release an album by the singer.

== Production and recording ==
The recordings took place during three sessions in August 1969 (on the 8th, 29th, and 30th), with the first at Western Records and the last two at Columbia Records Studios. There was also a session at A&R, in Manhattan. The album was produced by Larry Marks and arranged by Dick Hazard, Michael Colombier, Bob Thompson, and Peter Matz. Ray Gerhardt handled the audio engineering. The album's design is by Corporate Head, art direction by Tom Wilkes, and photography by Guy Webster.

Musically, it resembles its predecessor, combining popular music genres of the time, such as soft rock. The tracklist includes songs that were popular at that moment, such as "MacArthur Park" by Richard Harris, "Didn't We" by Jimmy Webb, the recent hit by Peter, Paul & Mary, "Leavin' on a Jet Plane," and songs by Newman, Gordon Lightfoot, Aretha Franklin, and Harry Nilsson. The rest of the compositions are the same mix of mainly then-current pop/rock and singer-songwriters songs with a couple of Broadway/Vaudevillian songs that made up the previous album.

== Release details ==
On December 20, 1969, Record World reported that on the occasion of Minnelli's show at the Olympia, Polydor was issuing the LP in France. The following month, on January 31, 1970, Billboard featured an advertisement for the album in its issue, announcing its release for February.

Similar to her previous albums released by A&M Records, this album was never issued alone on compact disc (CD), but all tracks in their original order are included in the 2008 compilation album The Complete A&M Recordings. The cover photo was used in the 2001 compilation 20th Century Masters – The Millennium Collection: The Best of Liza Minnelli.

== Promotion ==
As part of the promotion, Minnelli performed songs from the album on television shows such as The Ed Sullivan Show.

== Critical reception ==
Professional ratings
Review scores
Source	Rating
AllMusic	3.5/5 stars

Billboard wrote that the album demonstrated Minnelli's talent as a recording artist in addition to her success as a film actress and nightclub performer. The review described her performance of the title track as "beautiful" and highlighted her versions of "Leavin' on a Jet Plane", "Love Story", and "Wherefore and Why" as excellent treatments. Cashbox considered the album "excellent" and highlighted tracks "Leavin' on a Jet Plane" and "On a Slow Boat to China". The magazine's critic concluded by saying, "an excellent showcase for this talented young vocalist. Could be a substantial item". Record World noted that the album showcased Minnelli's continued affinity for the work of contemporary songwriters.

Morgan Ames from High Fidelity magazine wrote that she initially considered Minnelli a singer without previous technique, but her opinion changed over the years. She noted that the album's producer, Larry Marks, "made the artist express herself in the most perfect way possible". Ames stated that 'Come Saturday Morning' is elegant, current, suitable for the singer, featuring superb arrangements and a vocalist who "found out who she is as a singer" and whose vocals are more restrained, beautiful, and powerful than before. She selected the songs "Don't Let Me Lose This Dream", "Simon," and "Slow Boat to China" as the album's highlights. RPM called it a "long awaited set" that "won’t disappoint". The publication noted the title track as a natural highlight while also praising Minnelli's renditions of "Wailing of the Willow" and the medley "MacArthur Park/Didn't We". It further observed that the exposure from her film The Sterile Cuckoo would bring additional attention to the album.

In a retrospective review, William Ruhlmann of AllMusic wrote that "Minnelli handles the newer songs bravely (...), but typically comes to life only when singing the old song 'Nevertheless (I'm in Love with You),' which is more her style".

== Commercial performance ==
On May 2, 1970, Cash Box reported that "Minnelli's new set Come Saturday Morning was already receiving excellent advanced orders in Canada".

== Track listing ==
Come Saturday Morning
No.	Title	Writer(s)	Length
1.	"Come Saturday Morning"	Fred Karlin, Dory Previn	1:46
2.	"Raggedy Ann & Raggedy Andy"	Larry Marks, Marilyn & Alan Bergman	3:30
3.	"Leavin' on a Jet Plane"	John Denver	3:15
4.	"Wailing of the Willow"	Harry Nilsson	2:02
5.	"Nevertheless"	Bert Kalmar, Harry Ruby	2:52
6.	"Wherefore and Why"	Gordon Lightfoot	2:35
7.	"Love Story"	Randy Newman	2:29
8.	"On a Slow Boat to China"	Frank Loesser	3:18
9.	"Don't Let Me Lose This Dream"	Aretha Franklin, Ted White	3:03
10.	"Simon"	Peter Allen	3:08
11.	"MacArthur Park / Didn't We?"	Jimmy Webb	4:08

Come Saturday Morning Expanded Edition – bonus tracks
No.	Title	Writer(s)	Length
12.	"Frank Mills"	Gerome Ragni, James Rado, Galt MacDermot	2:57
13.	"Snow"	Randy Newman	2:29
14.	"Alicinha"	Luiz Henrique, Oscar Brown Jr.	3:19
15.	"Once in a Lifetime"	Luiz Henrique, Walter Wanderley	3:54
16.	"Listen to Me"	Luiz Henrique	4:25
17.	"I'm Looking Over a Four Leaf Clover"	Mort Dixon, Harry Woods	2:12

== Personnel ==
Credits adapted from Come Saturday Morning LP (A&M Records, SP4164).

- Produced by Larry Marks
- Engineered by Ray Gerhardt
- Arranged by Dick Hazard, Michel Colombier, Bob Thompson, Peter Matz,
- Original album engineers: Ray Gerhardt
- Piano on "MacArthur Park": Peter Allen
- Album design: Corporate Head
- Art director: Tom Wilkes
- Photography: Guy Webster
- Special thanks to Donald Hahn, A&R Studios
