= New Feelin' =

Studio album by Liza Minnelli
- Released: October 19, 1970
- Recorded: Spring–Summer 1970, Muscle Shoals Alabama
- Genre: Vocal, country-soul
- Label: A&M
- Producer: Rex Kramer

Liza Minnelli chronology
Come Saturday Morning (1969)	New Feelin' (1970)	Live at the Olympia in Paris (1972)

Singles from New Feelin'
- 1. "(I Wonder Where My) Easy Rider's Gone" Released: January 1971

New Feelin' is the sixth studio album by American singer and actress Liza Minnelli, released on October 19, 1970, by A&M Records. It was her third and final studio album for the label, following Come Saturday Morning (1969).

In an effort to update her sound for the contemporary rock-dominated market, the album features Minnelli interpreting classic songs from the Great American Songbook with modern, country-soul arrangements. Recorded in Muscle Shoals, Alabama, and produced by Rex Kramer.

The album was met with favorable reviews and became one of her best-charting releases of the decade. Plans for a follow-up album were abandoned as Minnelli began preparing for her career-defining role in the film Cabaret. The album was not reissued on CD individually but was included in its entirety in the 2008 2-CD set The Complete A&M Recordings.

== Production and recording ==
Following the underperformance of her previous album, Come Saturday Morning, A&M Records sought an alternative way to make Minnelli a successful recording artist, as she was in theater, film, and live shows. As rock music was on the rise, it was noted that her traditional music style was out of sync with the contemporary music scene. In this context, the idea emerged to record songs from the American Songbook that she liked but with modern arrangements in styles like country-soul.

The recordings took place in Muscle Shoals, Alabama, during the spring and summer of 1970. Mickey Buckins and Sonny Limbo were the recording engineers, and the art direction was handled by Tom Wilkes. The album was produced, arranged, and photographed (the cover and back cover) by Rex Kramer (lead vocalist of The Bojangles). The arrangements included twangy guitars, pulsating electric bass, organ, an energetic brass section, and female backing vocals with a gospel touch. The tracklist includes a selection of covers dating from 1917 to 1940.

== Release and promotion ==
The album was released on October 19, 1970. For promotional purposes, Minnelli appeared on various television shows such as This Is Tom Jones, The Ed Sullivan Show and The Johnny Cash Show. Additionally, she performed at the Grand Ole Opry, in Nashville.

Similar to previous albums from the A&M Records, this album was never released on its own in compact disc (CD) format, but all the tracks in the original order are included in the compilation The Complete A&M Recordings, released in 2008.

== Critical reception ==
Professional ratings
Review scores
Source	Rating
AllMusic	3/5 stars

Billboard wrote: "[in New Feelin'] she combines her charm and powerful voice with a sensitive feeling and achieves success". Cash Box remarked that "Liza Minnelli, sounding more like mom every day, puts together a beautiful package of standards guaranteed to warm your heart". The review noted that Minnelli"belts [the songs out] from beginning to end", and described the album as "her most impressive". RPM praised it as "the one you class-hungry programmers have been waiting for. No favourites here, they're all done up with a sweet and wild combination that can't help but please". Record World called it "a good idea that Liza, with her verve, brings off".

In a contemporary review, William Ruhlmann of AllMusic wrote that New Feelin' was "Minnelli's most contemporary-sounding record yet", though "the result was a failed experiment".

== Chart performance ==
The album became one of Minnelli's better-performing albums in the 1970s. It debuted on the Billboard Top LPs chart at number 169 on November 28, 1970. On December 5, 1970, it reached its peak position at number 158, and remaining on the chart for one more week.

New Feelin' debuted on the Cash Box Top 100 Albums chart on November 28, 1970, at number 109. The following week, it reached its peak position on the chart, climbing to number 105. In total, the album remained on the chart for 7 weeks, with its final appearance recorded on January 9, 1971, at position 137.

A fourth album to follow the relative success of New Feelin' was planned to be recorded in early 1971 but was scrapped as the singer was getting ready to give the performance that would put her on the map forever, the role of Sally Bowles in the movie adaptation of Kander and Ebb's musical Cabaret.

== Track listing ==
New Feelin'
No.	Title	Writer(s)	Length
1.	"Love for Sale"	Cole Porter	2:35
2.	"Stormy Weather"	Harold Arlen, Ted Koehler	2:40
3.	"Come Rain or Come Shine"	Harold Arlen, Johnny Mercer	3:12
4.	"Lazy Bones"	Johnny Mercer, Hoagy Carmichael	2:32
5.	"Can't Help Lovin' That Man of Mine"	Oscar Hammerstein II, Jerome Kern	2:35
6.	"(I Wonder Where My) Easy Rider's Gone"	Shelton Brooks	3:00
7.	"The Man I Love"	George Gershwin, Ira Gershwin	2:45
8.	"How Long Has This Been Going On?"	George Gershwin, Ira Gershwin	3:00
9.	"God Bless the Child"	Billie Holiday, Arthur Herzog	3:30
10.	"Maybe This Time"	Fred Ebb, John Kander	3:12

== Personnel ==
Credits adapted from the liner notes of New Feelin' LP (A&M Records, catalog no. SP-4272).

- Produced and arranged by Rex Kramer
- Original album engineers: Mickey Buckins, Sonny Limbo
- Art director: Tom Wilkes
- Photography: Rex Kramer

== Charts ==
Weekly chart for New Feelin'
Chart (1970)	Peak position
US Billboard 200	158
US Top 100 Albums (Cash Box)	105

== Other sources ==
- Liza Minnelli: When It Comes Down to It.......1968–1977 liner notes by Glenn A. Baker, 2003
- Liza Minnelli: The Complete A&M Recordings liner notes by Scott Schechter, 2008
- Liza Minnelli: The Complete Capitol Collection liner notes by Scott Schechter, 2006
