= Liza Minnelli (album) =

Studio album by Liza Minnelli
- Released: February 26, 1968
- Recorded: October–December 1967, Los Angeles, New York City
- Genres: Pop, vocal, traditional
- Label: A&M
- Producer: Larry Marks

Liza Minnelli chronology
There Is a Time (1966)	Liza Minnelli (1968)	Come Saturday Morning (1969)

Singles from Liza Minnelli
- 1. "Married" / "You Better Sit Down Kids" Released: February 19, 1968

Liza Minnelli is a self-titled studio album by Liza Minnelli. Released on February 26, 1968, by A&M Records in the United States, it contains her interpretations of pop/rock and singer/songwriters' songs. The production is by Larry Marks, and unlike her previous albums, this is the first one to depart from her typical Broadway sound and delve more into the contemporary pop genre of the 1960s and the works of singer-songwriters. The main inspiration for this change was her recent marriage to composer Peter Allen, who had a strong affinity for Randy Newman, whose songs are most prominent on this album.

The reception from music critics was favorable. Overall, they noted that the album was light, relaxed, and featured an effervescent performance by the singer, with many considering it Minnelli's best work up to that point. In 1969, HiFi Stereo Review magazine awarded the 1968 album Record of the Year.

== Background ==
Despite critical acclaim for her albums, her last release for Capitol Records, There Is a Time (1966), was not commercially successful. Her contract with the label was not renewed, and at that time, Minnelli was not yet the superstar she would become later. In the summer of 1967, she signed a contract with A&M Records and would release her first album on the label in 1968.

== Recording and production ==
The recordings took place between October 14 and December 1967. The album was produced by Larry Marks and arranged by Peter Matz, Nick de Caro, Bob Thompson, and J. Hill. The sound engineer was Ray Gerhardt, Donald Hahn, and Peter Matz. The album's graphic design is by Corporate Head, the art director is Tom Wilkes, and the photography is by Guy Webster.

For the new repertoire, Minnelli would record songs by contemporary artists and set aside the songs from the Great American Songbook for which she was known. Besides being the label's desire, the main inspiration for this change was Marks and composer Peter Allen, both of whom were impressed by the works of Randy Newman, with whom Allen had a strong affinity. The recording process for the album was documented by Record World magazine in its December 30, 1967, issue. The publication featured a photo of the preparations for the song "Snow", showing Minnelli and arranger/conductor Gordon Jenkins discussing the arrangements during the sessions. The report confirmed that "Snow" was one of the tracks to be included on Minnelli's first album for A&M Records, scheduled for release that January, and that the album was being produced by Larry Marks for the label. Nevertheless, the song was ultimately omitted from the album's final track list.

Among the songs that were recorded during the Liza Minnelli sessions but did not appear on the final release are: "Snow", "No One Ever Hurt so Bad," and "Hong Kong Blues". Four tracks were found on an A&M tape labeled "1968," namely: "I'm Looking Over a Four Leaf Clover", "Alicinha," "I'll Never Fall in Love Again", and "This Girl's in Love with You," and they were included in the compilation The Complete A&M Recordings.

== Release details ==
Before the album's release, the singer gave interviews and performed at various events and TV shows. According to the editor of Billboard, Aaron Stenfield, the singer performed at the Waldorf-Astoria's Empire Room, singing three songs from Liza Minnelli: "The Debutante's Ball", "You Better Sit Down Kids", and "The Happy Time". The editor was impressed by the singer's performance, writing that "if the album can capture any part of the excitement Miss Minnelli generates personally, A&M will have a valuable property".

Billboard announced the album's release for March in its March 9, 1968 issue. In its July 6, 1968 edition, the same magazine reported that A&M Records released the album to coincide with Minnelli's shows in the city at the Chequers Club.

Like her subsequent albums released by A&M Records, this album was never issued individually on the compact disc (CD) format, however, all tracks, in their original order, appear on the 2008 compilation The Complete A&M Recordings.

== Promotion ==
In an April 20, 1968, feature in Record World, Minnelli personally delivered her debut A&M album to the magazine's offices. She expressed high praise for producer Larry Marks and songwriter Randy Newman. According to the magazine, to promote the album, her schedule included television appearances on The Alan King Special and The Tonight Show, as well as presenting at the Tony Awards and performing a medley from Cabaret at the Grammy Awards.

According to Liza Minnelli Official German Homepage, she appeared on various American TV shows, including The Ed Sullivan Show (It aired on March 10, 1968, Minnelli performed the songs "You'd Better Sit Down Kids," "The Life of the Party", and "It’'s Today"), The Tonight Show, The Hollywood Palace, and The Carol Burnett Show (It aired on February 5, 1968, Minnelli performed the songs "Butterfly McHeart", "The Happy Time", and "Big Beautiful Ball").

== Critical reception ==
Professional ratings
Review scores
Source	Rating
AllMusic	3.5/5 stars

According to Record World's review "Liza has adopted the easy, relaxed style of the label's summer, showing herself smooth and fresh rather than bold". He considered the songs "The Happy Time" and "The Look of Love" wonderful. Billboard noted that Minnelli sounded like her mother, singer and actress Judy Garland, and that was a good thing. The magazine stated that three songs stood out on the album: "The Look of Love", "(The Tragedy of) Butterfly McHeart", and "The Happy Time". Cashbox magazine declared Liza Minnelli a victorious entry. They picked out "The Debutante's Ball", "The Look of Love", "You'd Better Sit Down, Kids", and "The Happy Time" as the album's standout moments.

Rex Reed of HiFi Stereo Review wrote that the album "is a lesson in sensitive lyricism" and "simply wonderful". He stated that Minnelli's voice on the recording "is better than ever—full of joy and soft splendor, melancholy innocence, and touches of mature woman's sarcasm and elegance". Morgan Ames of High Fidelity, considered the record a pleasant surprise, especially due to Minnelli's gentle singing. He noted that many critics believed that the artist's voice would not last long due to her deplorable condition and disastrous off-pitch performances throughout her career, but the album proved otherwise. He concluded by saying that Minnelli seemed to be finding a better focus on what she wanted to sing, and her vocals were great, except when she "screams" in the songs.

In a retrospective review, JT Griffith of AllMusic defined the album as an energetic collection that captures a lively artist in a solid set of songs. He noted that the track list mixes Broadway numbers with material from contemporary singer-songwriters of the time.

== Awards ==
In 1969, HiFi Stereo Review magazine awarded the 1968 album Record of the Year. The distinction was part of a selection aimed at recognizing, through the evaluation of critics and editors, the most artistically significant records of the year, regardless of their commercial performance. Minnelli received the award from editor William Anderson and critic Red Reed.

Awards and nominations for Liza Minnelli
Year	Organization	Award	Result	Ref.
1969	Hi-Fi/Stereo Review	Record of the Year	Won	

== Track listing ==
Liza Minnelli
No.	Title	Writer(s)	Length
1.	"The Debutante's Ball"	Randy Newman	2:54
2.	"Happyland"	Randy Newman	2:24
3.	"The Look of Love" (from the film Casino Royale)	Hal David, Burt Bacharach	3:35
4.	"(The Tragedy of) Butterfly McHeart"	Peter Allen, Chris Allen	2:16
5.	"Waiting for My Friend" (from the film Smashing Time)	John Addison, George Melly	2:48
6.	"Married / You Better Sit Down Kids" (from the musical Cabaret)	Fred Ebb, John Kander / Sonny Bono	4:57
7.	"So Long Dad"	Randy Newman	2:09
8.	"For No One"	John Lennon, Paul McCartney	2:28
9.	"My Mammy"	Sam M. Lewis, Joe Young, Walter Donaldson	3:01
10.	"The Happy Time"	Fred Ebb, John Kander	2:39

== Personnel ==
Credits adapted from Liza Minnelli LP (A&M Records, SP 4141)

- Produced by Larry Marks
- Arranged by Peter Matz (tracks 3, 5–8, 10), Nick De Caro (tracks 1, 2, 11), Bob Thompson (track 9), J. Hill (track 4)
- Original album engineers: Ray Gerhardt, Don Hahn, Peter Matz
- Album design: Corporate Head
- Art director: Tom Wilkes
- Photography: Guy Webster
