= I Wonder Where My Easy Rider's Gone =

Song performed by Bessie Smith

"I Wonder Where My Easy Rider's Gone?"
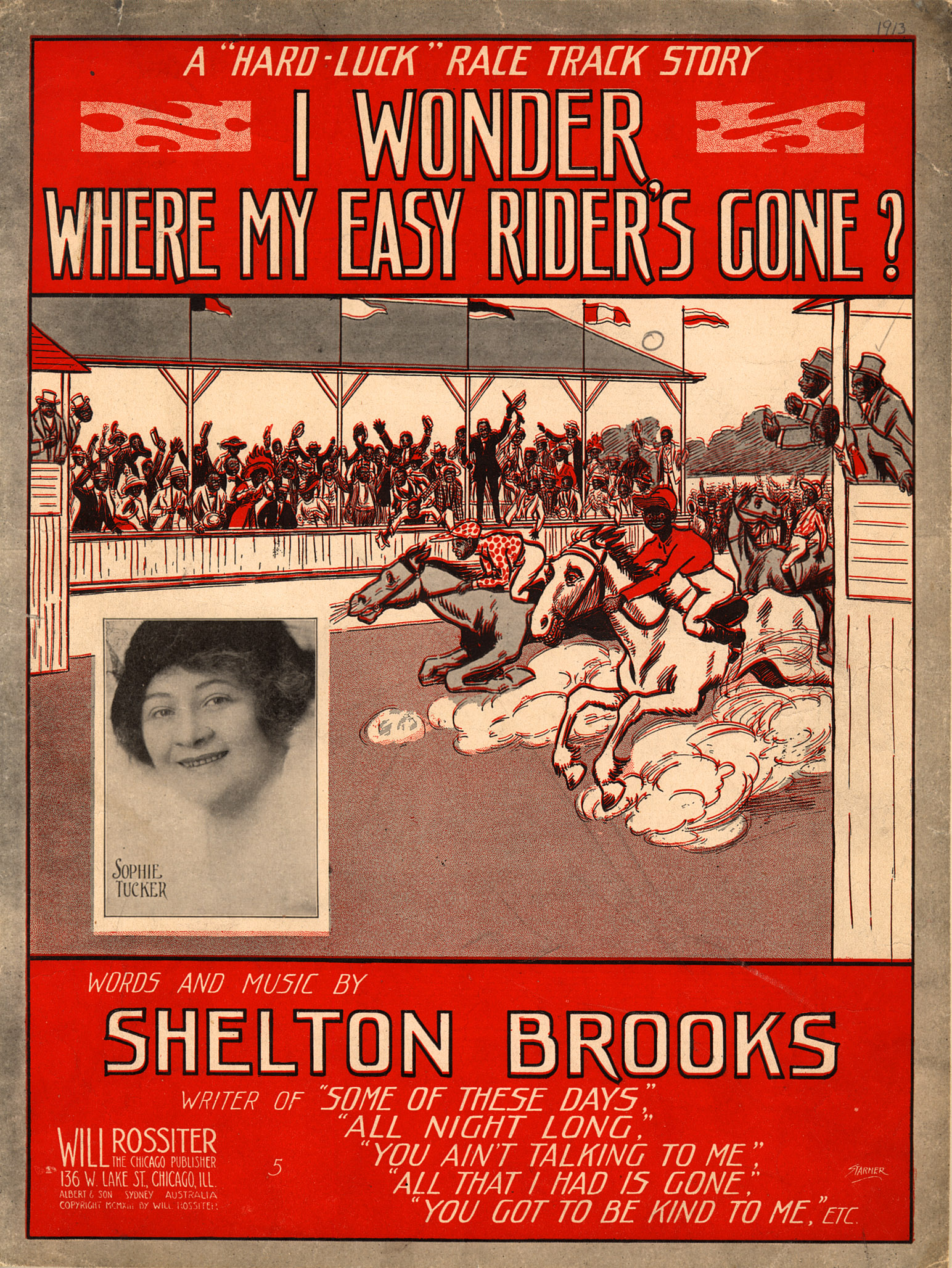
- Sheet music cover (1913)

Song
- Published: 1913
- Genre: Ragtime
- Songwriter(s): Shelton Brooks

"I Wonder Where My Easy Rider's Gone?" is a ragtime/blues song written by Shelton Brooks in 1913. Sometimes categorized as hokum, it led to an answer song written in 1915 by W.C. Handy, "Yellow Dog Rag", later titled "Yellow Dog Blues". Lines and melody from both songs show up in the 1920s and 1930s in such songs as "E. Z. Rider", "See See Rider", "C. C. Rider", and "Easy Rider Blues".

== "I Wonder Where My Easy Rider's Gone?" ==
Written for the vaudeville stage, the lyrics tell of a Susie Johnson who bets on a horse race using a tip from Jockey Lee, who subsequently runs off with her money.

First verse:

Miss Susie Johnson is a crazy as can be
About that easy riding kid they call Jockey Lee
Now don't you think it's funny, only bets her money
In the race friend jockey's goin' to be
There was a race down at the track the other day
And Susie got an inside tip right away
She bet a "hundred to one" that her little "Hon"
Would bring home all the "mon"
When she found out "Jockey" was not there
Miss Susie cried out in despair

Chorus:

I wonder where my easy rider's gone today
He never told me he was goin' away
If he was here he'd win the race
If not first he'd get a "place"
Cash in our winnings, on a "joy-ride" we'd go, right away
I'm losing my money that's why I am blue
To win a race, Lee knows just what to do
I'd put all my junk in pawn
To be on any horse that jockey's on
Oh' I wonder where my easy rider's gone

"I Wonder Where My Easy Rider's Gone?" was first popularized on the vaudeville stage by Sophie Tucker. It is most noted for its performance in a 1933 movie, She Done Him Wrong, in which Mae West sang it in a suggestive manner. It is perhaps this performance which gave it its hokum reputation.

== "Yellow Dog Rag"/"Yellow Dog Blues" ==
"Yellow Dog Rag"
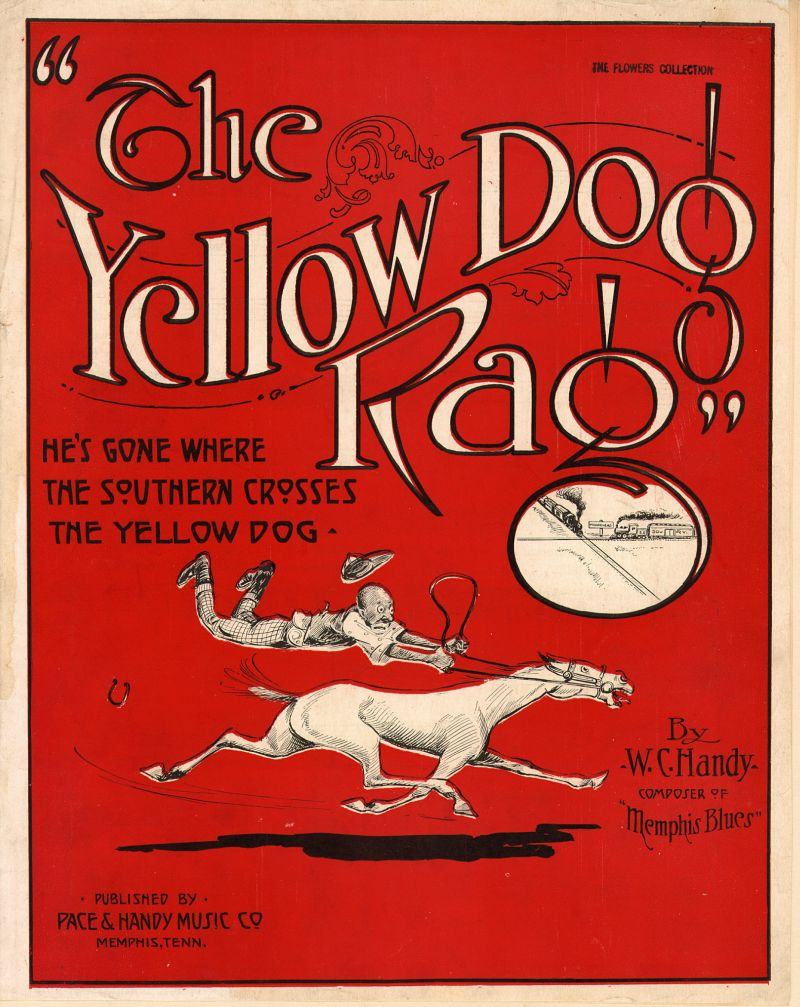
- Sheet music cover (1915)

Song
- Published: 1915
- Genre: Ragtime
- Songwriter(s): W.C. Handy

In 1915, W.C. Handy wrote an answer song to "I Wonder Where My Easy Rider's Gone?" which he called "Yellow Dog Rag." "Yellow Dog Rag" sold poorly. In 1919, he retitled it "Yellow Dog Blues" to take advantage of the popularity of blues, after which it sold moderately well. His song explains what became of Jockey Lee.

The version quoted is how Bessie Smith sang it in her well-known 1925 recording:

First verse:

E'er since Miss Susan Johnson lost her Jockey, Lee
There has been much excitement, more to be
You can hear her moaning night and morn
She's wonderin where her Easy Rider's gone?
Cablegrams goes off inquiry
Telegrams come in of sympathy
Letters come from down in "Bam"
And everywhere that Uncle Sam
Has a rural free delivery (1)
All day the phone rings, but it's not for me
At las' good tidings fill my heart with glee
This message came from Tennessee

Chorus:

Miss Sue your Easy Rider struck this burg today
On a southboun' rattler side door Pullman car (2)
Seen him here an' he was on the hog
Miss Sue your easy rider got to stay away
So he had to vamp it but the hike ain't far
He's gone where the Southern cross' the Yellow Dog
Dear Sue your, etc.

(1) (Rural Free Delivery or RFD as it was popularly called was a service by the post office to deliver mail directly to rural farm families)

(2) a "side door Pullman car" was hobo slang for a box car with the cargo door open which made it easy to "bum" a ride.

The "Yellow Dog" was the local name for the Yazoo Delta Railroad; the "Southern" is the much larger Southern Railway.

"Yellow Dog Blues" has been recorded a number of times, mostly as an instrumental, and has become a traditional jazz standard. Berl Olswanger and the Berl Olswanger Orchestra included its instrumental version on their album Berl Olswanger Orchestra with the Olswanger Beat (1964).

== See also ==
- See See Rider
- Yazoo and Mississippi Valley Railroad
- List of train songs

== Bibliography ==
- Louvish, Simon. Mae West: It Ain't No Sin. St. Martin's Griffin (2007).
- Rubin, Louis Decimus. Where the Southern Cross the Yellow Dog: On Writers and Writing. University of Missouri Press (2005).
- Wald, Elijah. Escaping the Delta: Robert Johnson and the Invention of the Blues. Harper Collins (2004)
- Wintz, Cary D.; Finkelman, Paul. Encyclopedia of the Harlem Renaissance. Routledge (2004).
