= Easy Ride =

Easy Ride may refer to:

- "Easy Ride", song by The Doors from The Soft Parade
- "Easy Ride", song by Madonna from American Life

== See also ==
- Easy Rider (disambiguation)
