= Self Winding Clock Company =

Former manufacturer of electric clocks

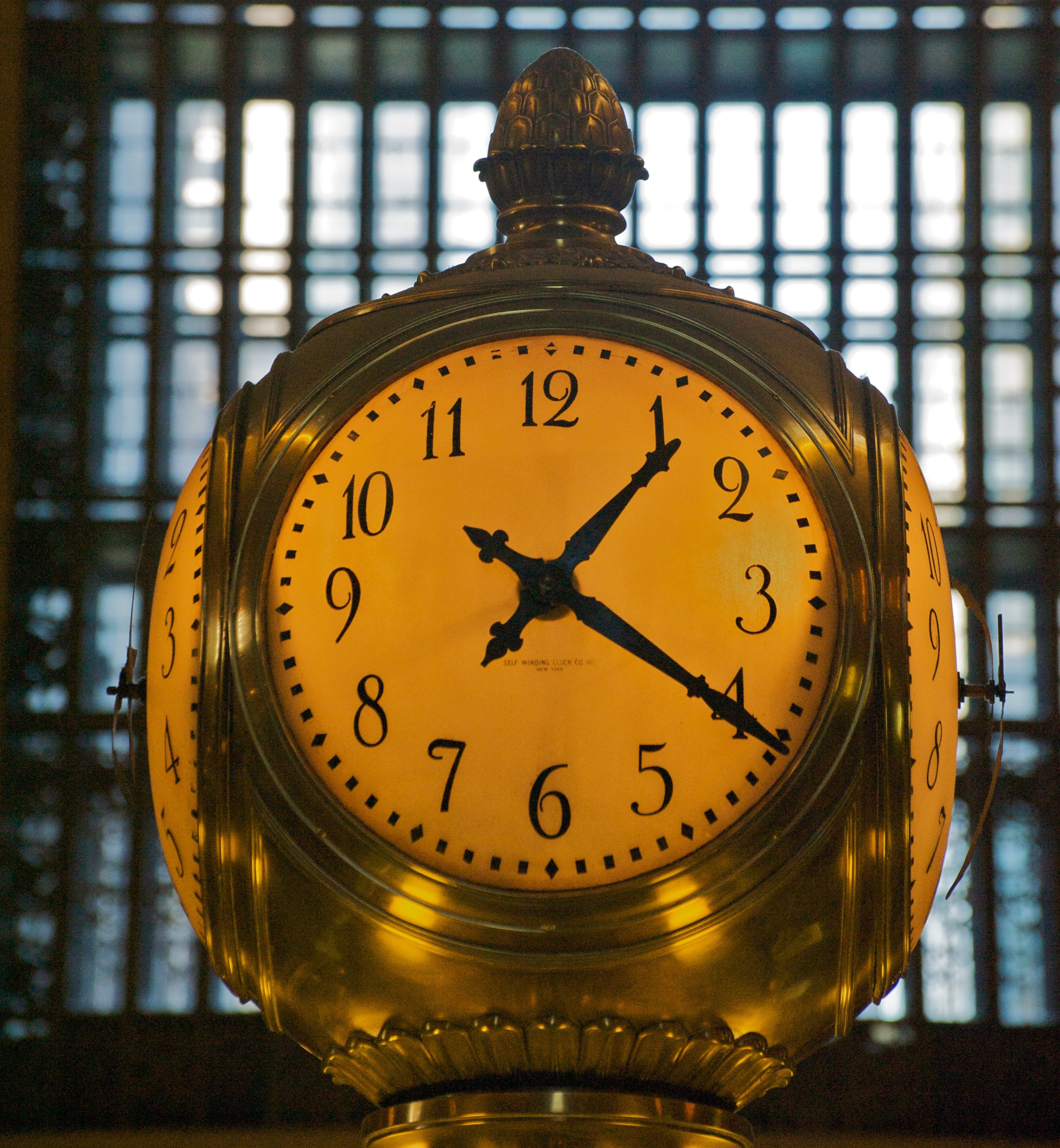
Clock in Grand Central Terminal on the information kiosk. The clock has four 24-inch (61 cm) dials and was made by the Self Winding Clock Company. It was installed in 1913.

The Self Winding Clock Company (SWCC) was a major manufacturer of electromechanical clocks from 1886 until about 1970. Based in New York City, the company was one of the first to power its clocks with an electric motor instead of winding by hand.

A patented clock mechanism automatically rewinds the main spring each hour by the small electric motor. A contact switch mounted on the clock's center shaft is activated after the clock has run for one hour and the main spring is rewound one revolution. This rewinding occurs each hour. The power for the motor is supplied by batteries and the batteries last about one year.

== History ==
The Self Winding Clock Company clock movement was patented by one of the company founders, Chester Henry Pond (1844–1912) in 1884 (Patent No. 308,521). Pond was also a principal in the Gamewell Fire Alarm-Telegraph Company. He was an accomplished instrument maker and a pioneer in the developing field of electricity. He designed a small electric motor and matched it with a conventional clock mechanism.

In 1886, Pond patented a correction device that used an electric current to activate a mechanical lever attached to the clock movement. This correction attachment would move the clock hands precisely to the hour (Patent No. 339,688). If the clock is not absolutely accurate, it would be corrected when receiving the hourly time signal over a telegraph line from a master clock calibrated to the US Naval Observatory. This correction was referred to as synchronizing, and many SWCC clocks were fitted with this option.

The original SWCC factory was located at 205 Willoughby Avenue in Brooklyn, New York. This site was across from the Pratt Institute, and now is part of the Pratt Institute campus. Charles Pratt (1830–1891), the founder of Pratt Institute, was also one of SWCC's original founders and the company started business in his buildings. The SWCC factory remained in Brooklyn until they moved to 75 Varick Street, New York at some time in the 1950s, to apparently make room for expansion at the Pratt Institute. In addition to doing the clock manufacturing in Brooklyn, SWCC had business offices at various locations in New York City throughout its long history.

== Clock movements ==
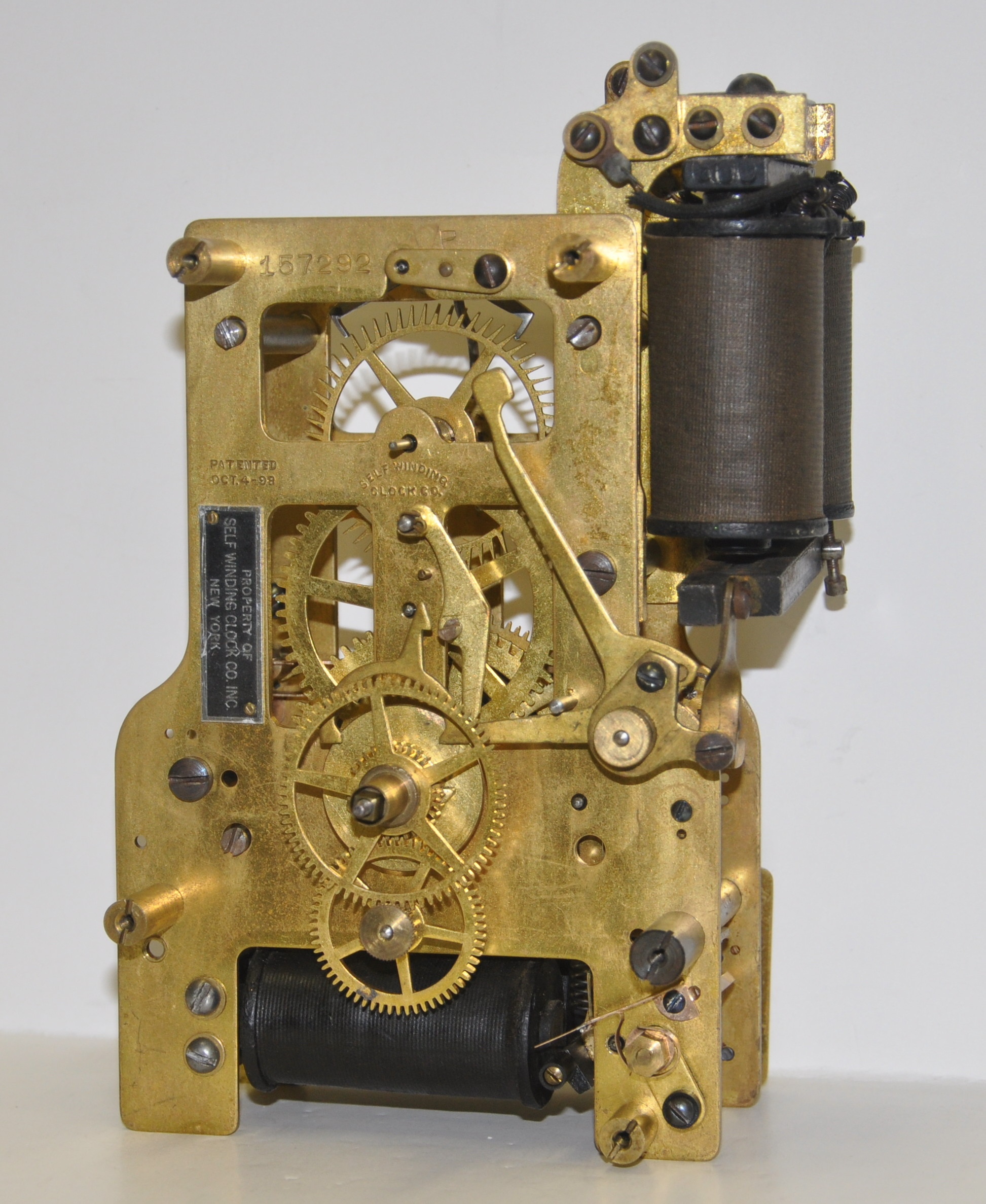
SWCC Style F Vibrator movement

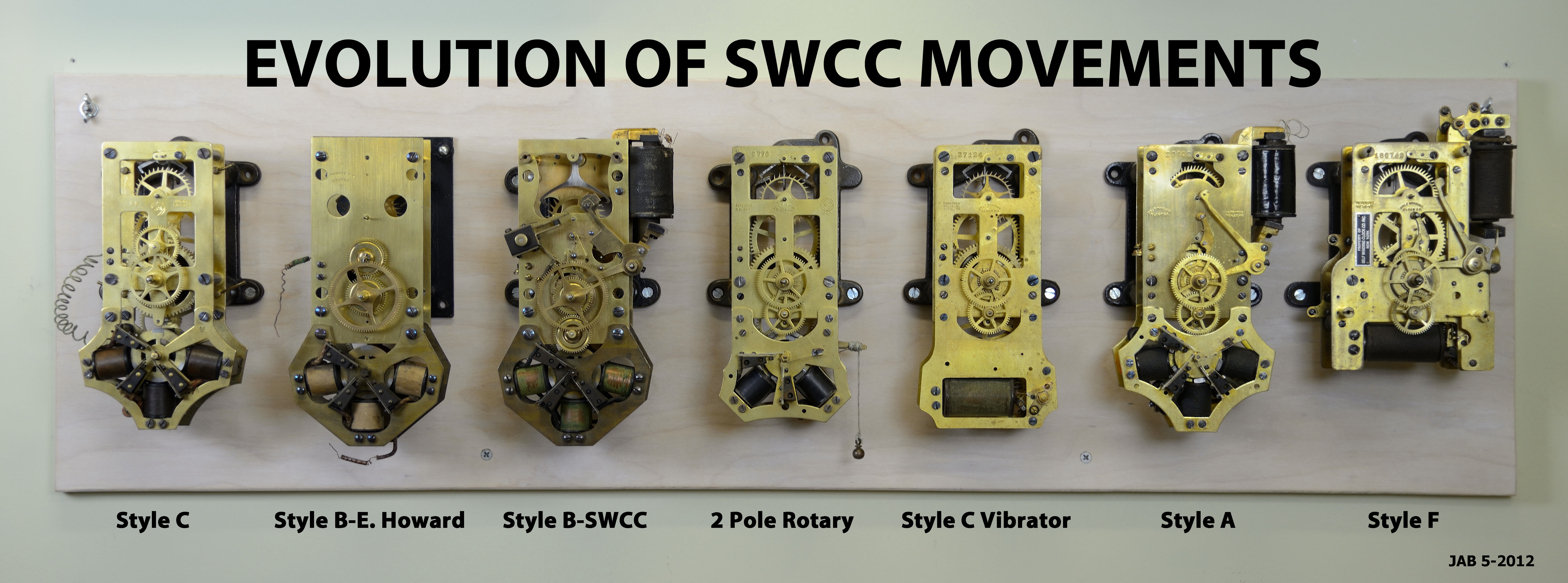
Seven styles of SWCC movement. Styles C and B from 1886 to Style F from 1898

When Self Winding Clock Company started producing clocks, the vast majority of the actual clock movements were made by the Seth Thomas Clock Company and the remainder were made by the E. Howard & Co. The most expensive clocks could be equipped with the higher grade movement made by E. Howard. SWCC then fitted their motor-winding components and synchronizing apparatus to the movements. The movements were mounted in cases of various designs, often in case styles similar to those of companies like Seth Thomas and E. Howard. The SWCC appears to have been manufacturing their own clock movements by 1892, for they are all stamped "Self Winding Clock Co". Earlier movements were stamped with Seth Thomas or E. Howard markings.

The unique feature of SWCC clocks was that the clocks were wound electrically. The success of SWCC depended upon the clocks being reliably wound every hour without failure. The hourly winding motor was the one element of the clock that was most likely to fail. Over a span of about 15 years, the design of the SWCC movements went through a series of modifications aimed at improving reliability. The first six different styles all had the winding motor added to the SWCC movement. The final design, termed the "F" movement or Vibrator movement, was a major improvement. This movement, with minor modifications, was used for the next 60 plus years. In this design, the motor proved to be much more reliable and was now an integral part of the movement rather than added on below the clock works. The "F" movement motor employed a vibrating up and down motion rather than rotary motion to re-wind the mainspring.

SWCC imprinted all of their movements with serial numbers. The serial numbers were used for inventory purposes and were assigned in ascending order. It is possible to approximately date the time of manufacture of a movement based on the serial number. The first "F" movements were made in 1898 and were made into the 1940s. However, it is not possible to automatically date a particular clock by the movement serial number. SWCC had a practice of exchanging clock movements rather than servicing a movement and then returning it to the same clock. This results in rarely finding a SWCC clock with its original movement. Identification tag numbers also often do not match movement serial numbers because the tags were not changed when the movement was exchanged. The total number of "F" movements manufactured could be confusing. The lowest serial numbers are in the 33,000 range and the highest is in the 402,000 range. There were large numbering gaps and it has been calculated that probably around 200,000 movements were produced.

== Western Union time service ==
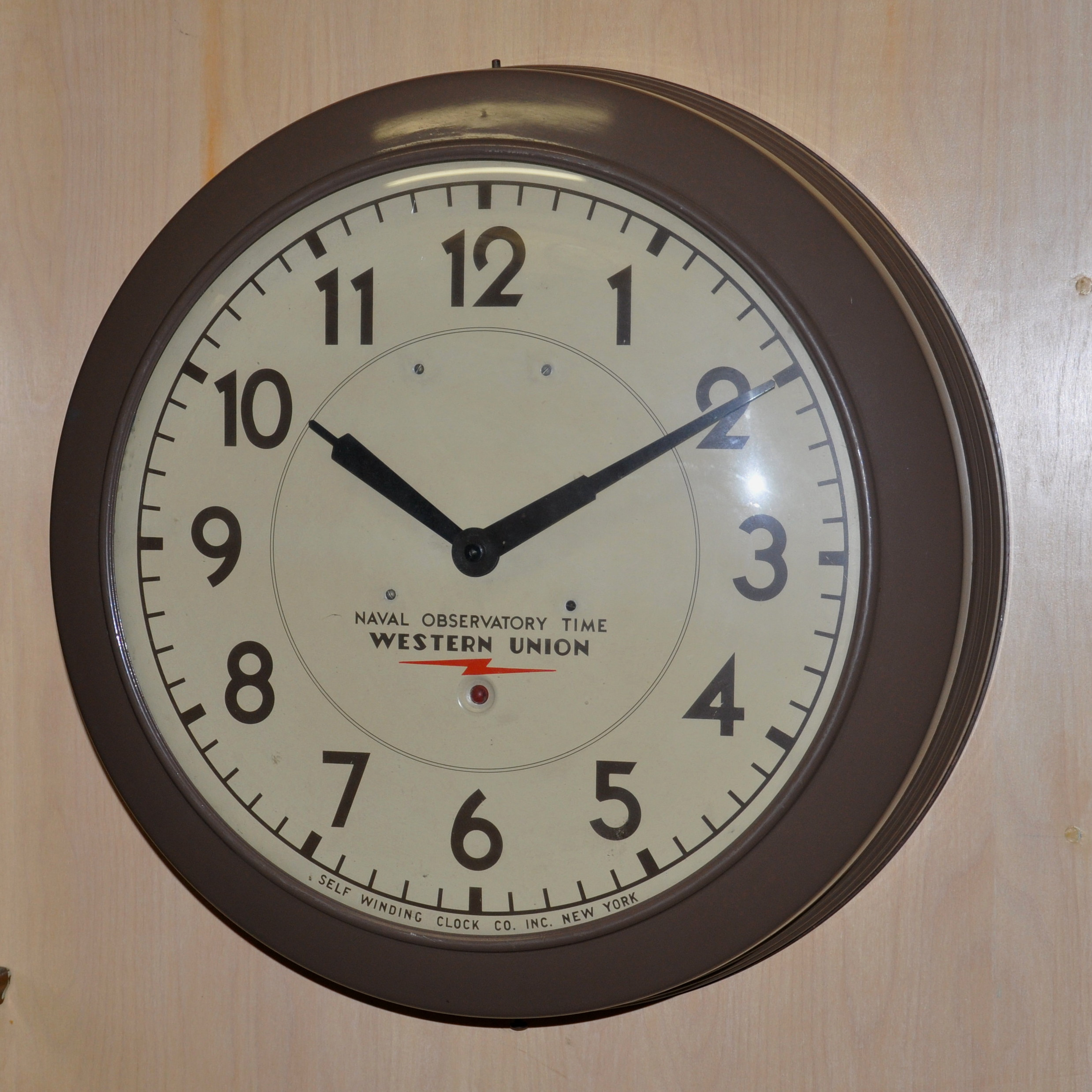
SWCC Western Union clock

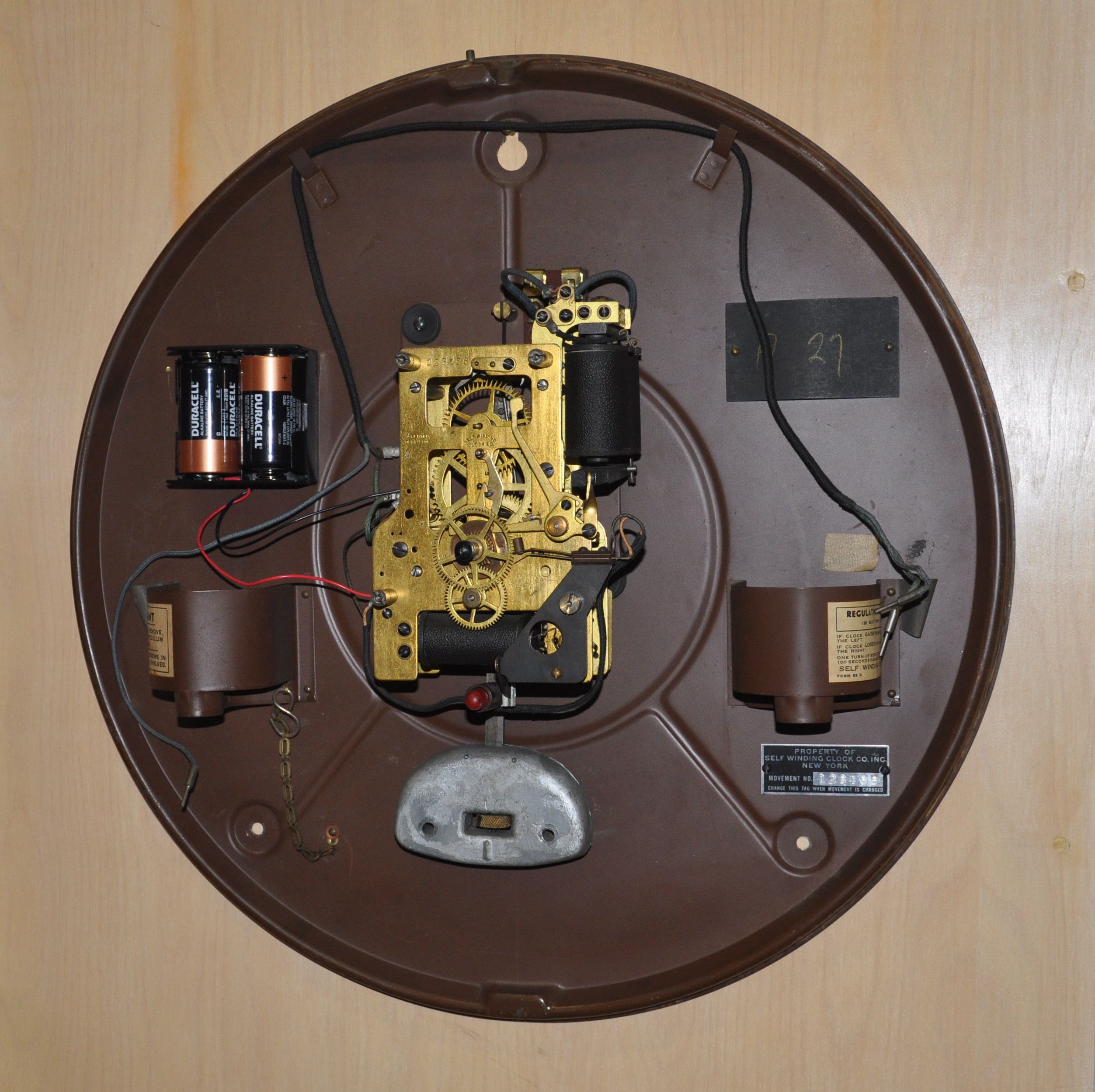
SWCC Western Union clock interior

The relationship of the Self Winding Clock Company with Western Union (WU) began with an agreement between the companies of June 1889. Its subject matter was for the transmission of time signals over Western Union telegraph lines to synchronize clocks made by SWCC. The company owned the clocks and WU installed and maintained them for a monthly fee, ranging from $1.25 to $2.00 per clock. SWCC was paid a percentage of the rental fee for providing clocks for WU customers. If the clock movements required major repairs, they were sent to a SWCC repair facility and a replacement movement was installed by WU at the customer location. The partnership between SWCC and WU ended in 1963 when, as part of a lawsuit settlement, WU purchased all the rental clocks from SWCC. By the late 1960s, the time-service business had run its course and ceased to be profitable. Most of the clocks were simply abandoned.

== Notable clock designs ==
The SWCC clock's were usually used in synchronized time systems. Time systems that consisted of many clocks linked electrically to a master clock. The majority of the systems were installed in businesses, factories, banks, schools, and universities. Many railroads also relied on SWCC synchronized clock systems. Some clocks were sold as individual timepieces but most clocks were a part of time systems. SWCC offered many very elegant designs for their clocks and the clocks could be purchased to match any decor. These were essentially catalog items. There were however many special one-of-a-kind clocks and clock systems that were installed by SWCC. These were intended to be very important architectural statements. Two of the most significant installations were the clocks at Grand Central Terminal and the enormous four-dial clock and lighting system for the Metropolitan Life Insurance Company Tower. The two pictured clocks of the Grand Central Terminal and the outside clocks on the Metropolitan Life Insurance Tower were just part of each property's very complex synchronized time systems. Grand Central Terminal had a master clock that controlled all the clocks at the terminal. Metropolitan Life had two separate master clocks. One controlled the motors for the four outside clocks, rang the bells in the bell tower and controlled the spectacular and very complex outside lighting system. Another SWCC master clock controlled 184 slave clocks throughout the original building. Complex SWCC synchronized systems were also installed in the London Underground. The underground installation started in 1905 and eventually included about 600 SWCC clocks.

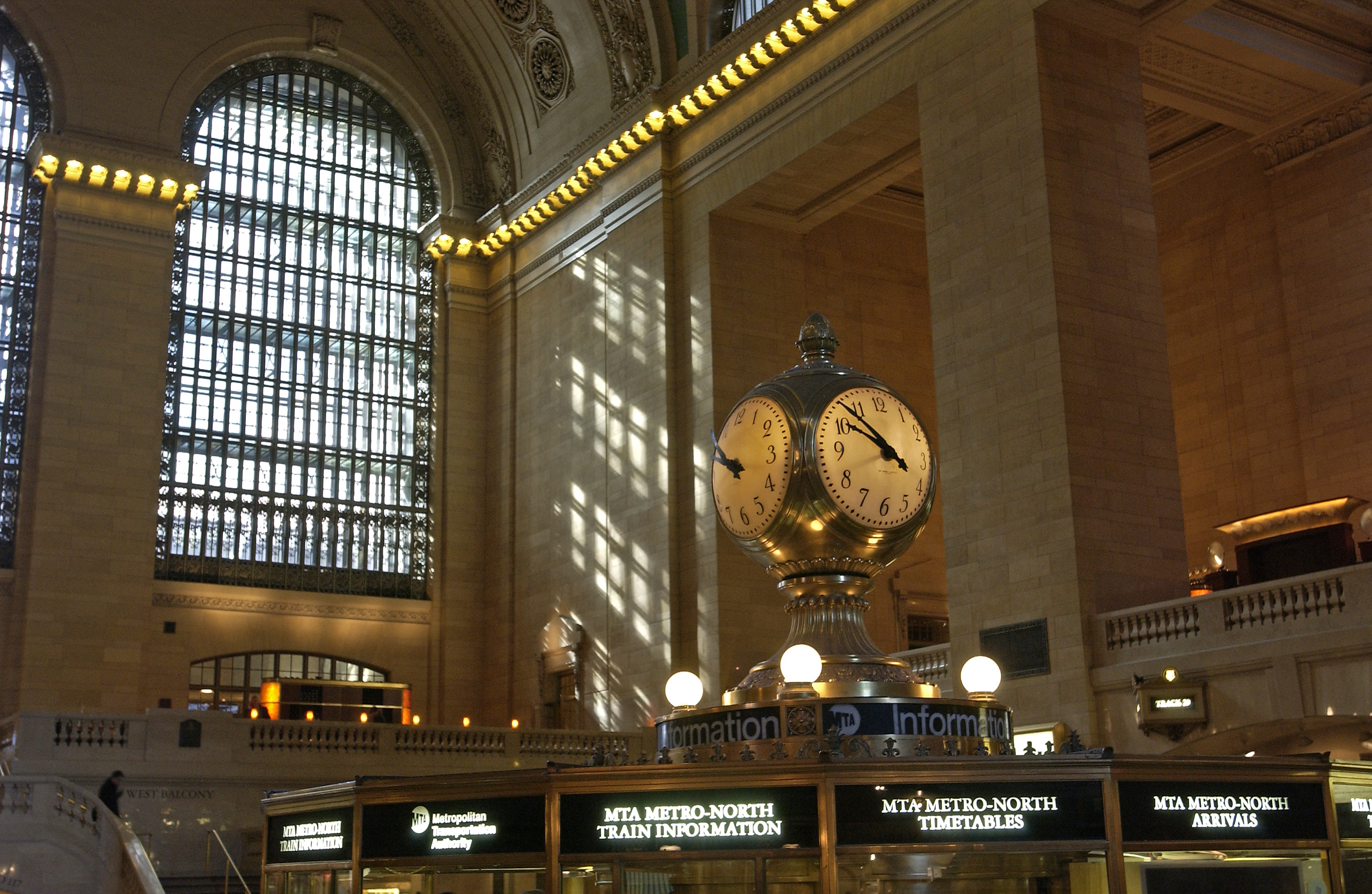
Four-dial clock in Grand Central Terminal's Main Concourse, installed in 1913

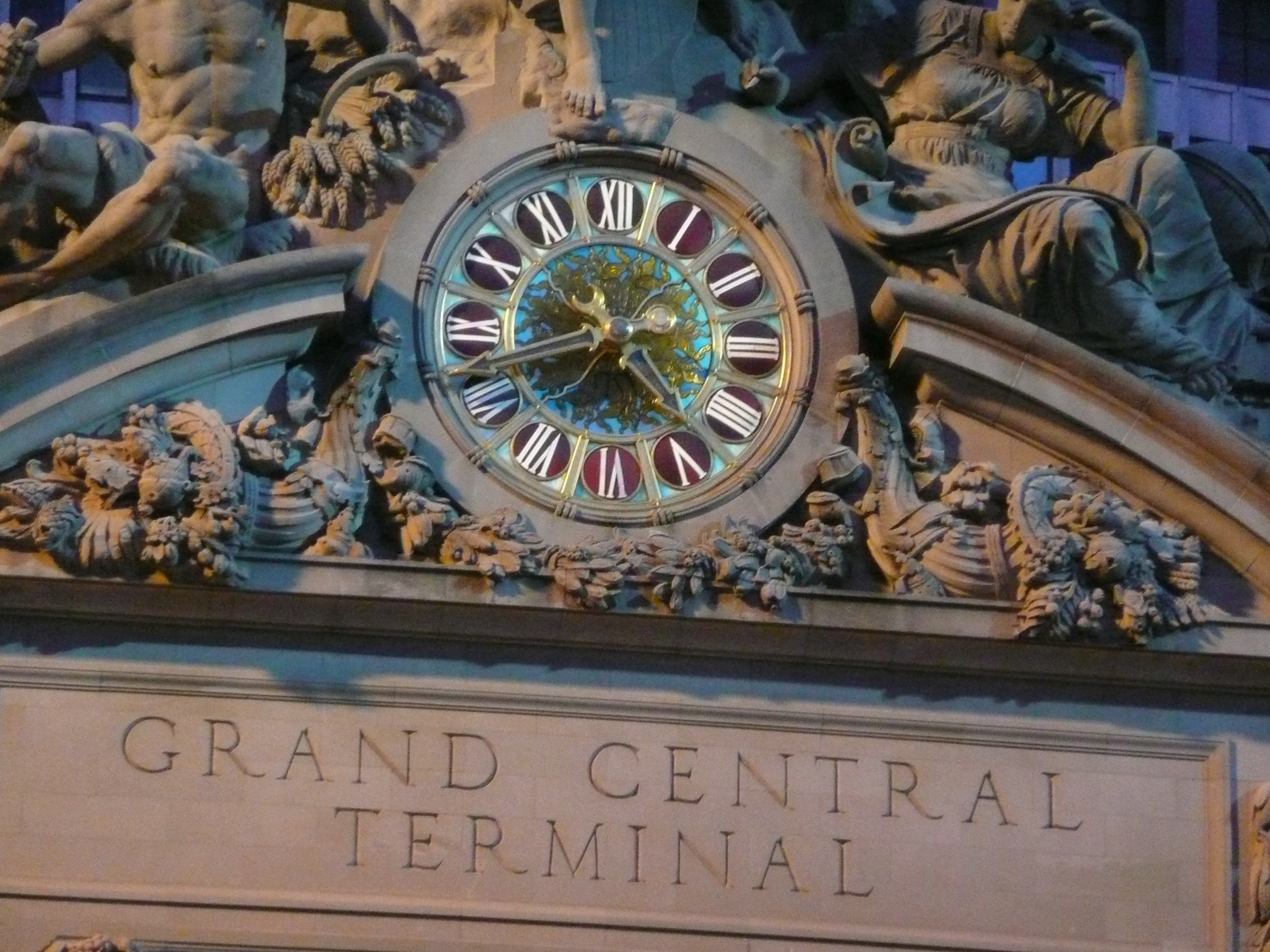
Clock outside Grand Central Terminal, installed in 1913

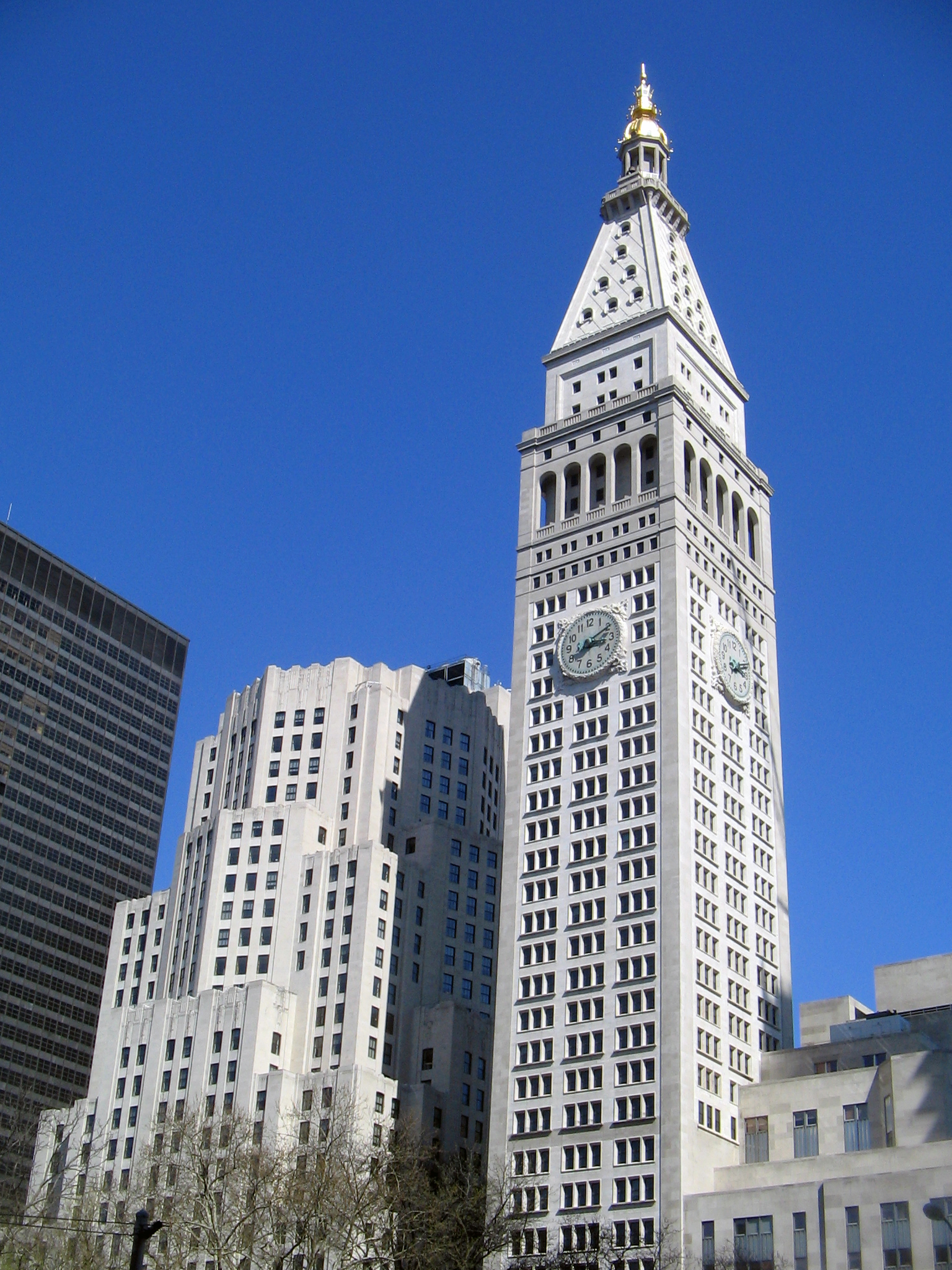
Clock faces on Metropolitan Life Insurance Company Tower, installed in 1909

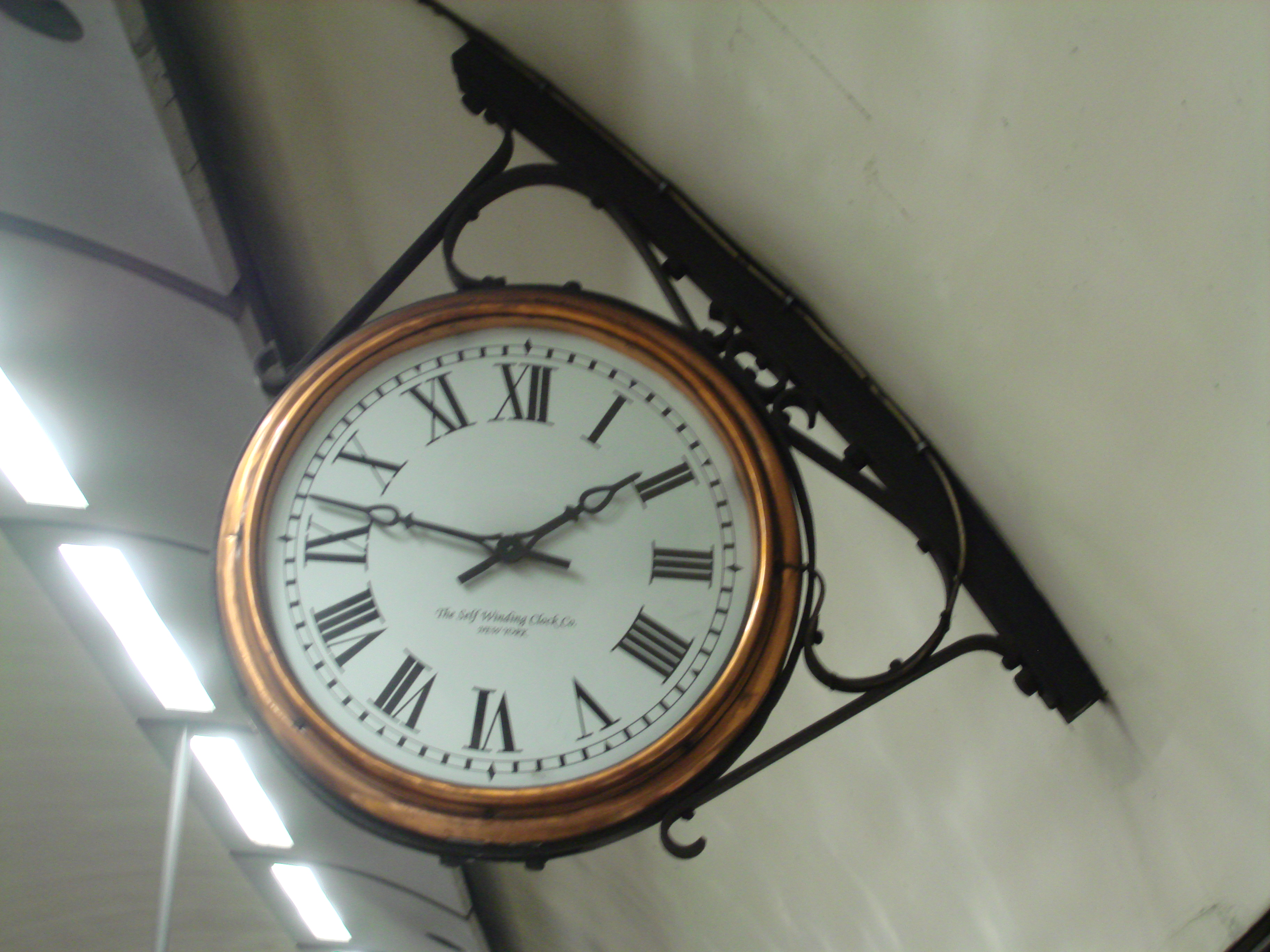
Clock at Tooting Bec tube station

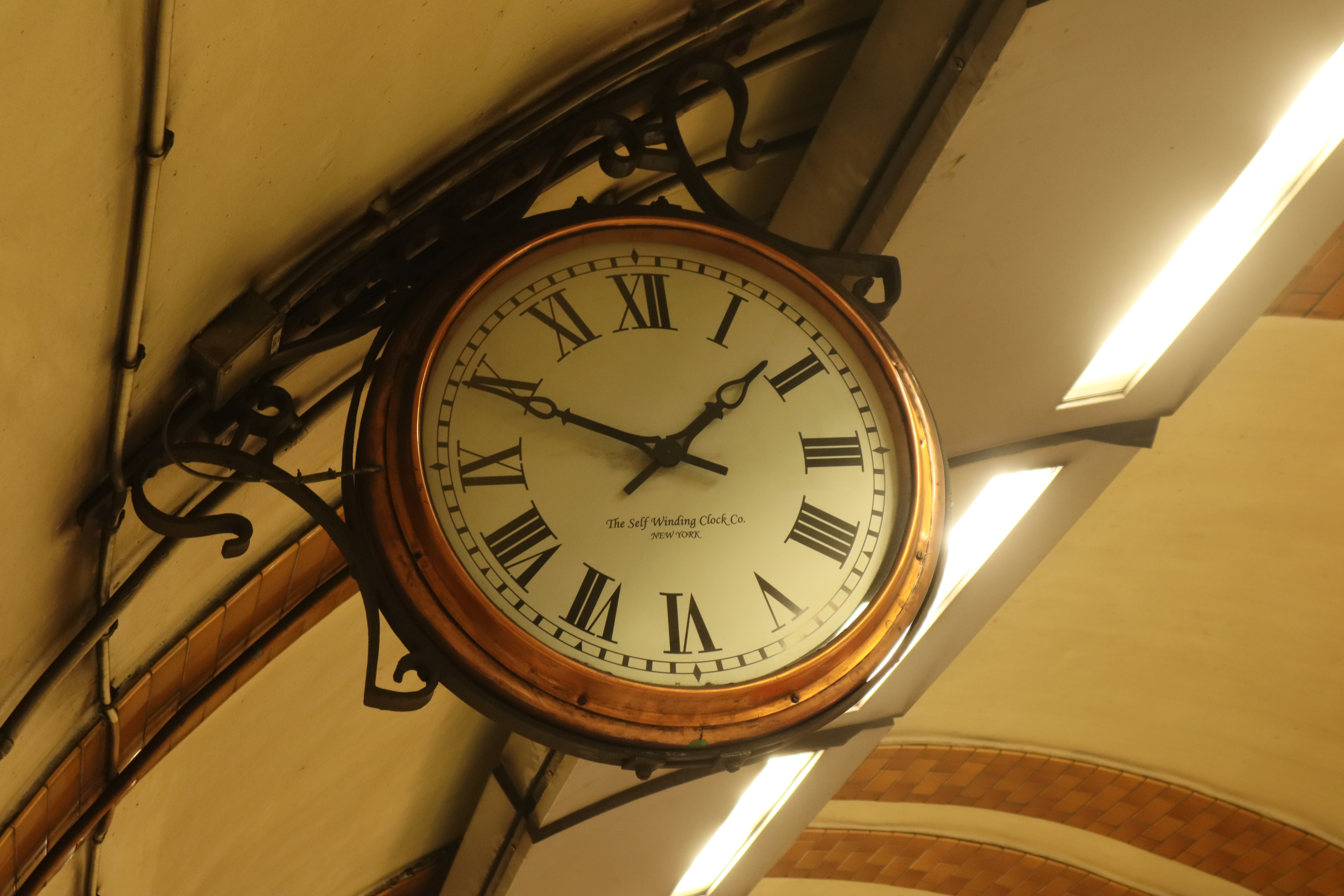
Clock at Tufnell Park tube station
