= Easy Rider (disambiguation) =

Easy Rider is a 1969 road movie.

Easy Rider may also refer to:

== Music ==
- Easy Rider (soundtrack), the soundtrack from the film
- The Easy Riders, an American folk band
- "See See Rider" or "Easy Rider", a traditional blues song
- "Easy Rider", a song by Kyoko Fukada, 1999
- "Easy Rider (Let the Wind Pay the Way)", a song by Iron Butterfly from Metamorphosis, 1970

== Other uses ==
- Easy rider (slang), an American slang expression
- Easyrider (smart card), a smartcard used for transportation in England
- Easyriders, a motorcycle magazine
- "Easy Rider" (Full House), a 1991 television episode
- Easy Rider: The Ride Back, 2012 purported sequel film.

== See also ==
- Easy Riders, Raging Bulls, a nonfiction book by Peter Biskind
- "Ezy Ryder", a song by Jimi Hendrix
