= Moorhead, Mississippi =

- City
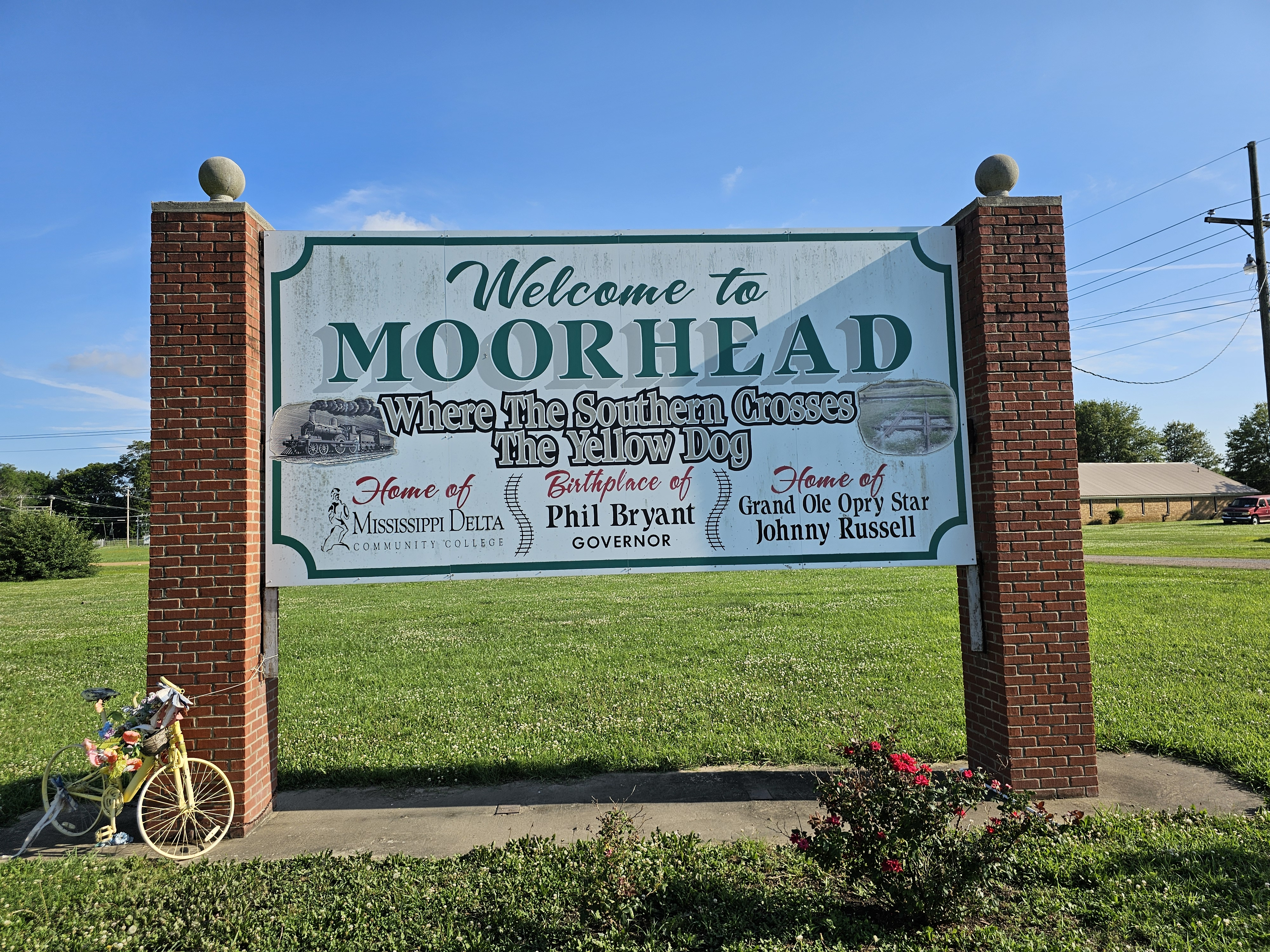
- Entrance sign

- Flag Seal

- Location of Moorhead, Mississippi

- Location in the United States
- Coordinates: 33°26′58″N 90°30′17″W
- Country: United States
- State: Mississippi
- County: Sunflower

Area
  - Total: 1.29 sq mi (3.35 km^{2})
  - Land: 1.29 sq mi (3.35 km^{2})
  - Water: 0 sq mi (0.00 km^{2})
- Elevation: 115 ft (35 m)

Population (2020)
  - Total: 1,937
  - Density: 1,495.4/sq mi (577.39/km^{2})
- Time zone: UTC-6 (Central (CST))
  - Summer (DST): UTC-5 (CDT)
- ZIP code: 38761
- Area code: 662
- FIPS code: 28-48760
- GNIS feature ID: 2404297

Moorhead is a city in Sunflower County, Mississippi, United States. As of the 2010 census, the city population was 2,405. This dropped in 2022 and the population recorded was 1,512.

== Geography ==
According to the United States Census Bureau, the city has a total area of 1.3 square miles (3.4 km^{2}), of which 1.3 square miles (3.4 km^{2}) is land and 0.77% is water.

Moorhead is along U.S. Route 82, east of Indianola, at its intersection with Mississippi Highway 3. Moorhead is located at the intersection of the Southern and Yazoo Delta railroads. This is the origin of the legendary blues crossroads phrase "where the Southern cross the Dog".

=== Climate ===
Moorhead has a humid subtropical climate (Köppen Cfa) with long, hot summers and short, mild winters.

Climate data for Moorhead, Mississippi (1991–2020 normals, extremes 1913–2019)
| Month | Jan | Feb | Mar | Apr | May | Jun | Jul | Aug | Sep | Oct | Nov | Dec | Year |
|---|---|---|---|---|---|---|---|---|---|---|---|---|---|
| Record high °F (°C) | 83 (28) | 89 (32) | 90 (32) | 94 (34) | 101 (38) | 109 (43) | 110 (43) | 108 (42) | 108 (42) | 99 (37) | 88 (31) | 85 (29) | 110 (43) |
| Mean maximum °F (°C) | 72.2 (22.3) | 75.6 (24.2) | 81.3 (27.4) | 86.2 (30.1) | 90.8 (32.7) | 94.3 (34.6) | 96.9 (36.1) | 98.4 (36.9) | 96.5 (35.8) | 89.6 (32.0) | 81.2 (27.3) | 74.3 (23.5) | 99.2 (37.3) |
| Mean daily maximum °F (°C) | 52.2 (11.2) | 56.6 (13.7) | 65.2 (18.4) | 73.7 (23.2) | 81.7 (27.6) | 87.9 (31.1) | 90.6 (32.6) | 91.3 (32.9) | 87.2 (30.7) | 76.9 (24.9) | 64.1 (17.8) | 55.1 (12.8) | 73.5 (23.1) |
| Daily mean °F (°C) | 43.7 (6.5) | 47.6 (8.7) | 55.7 (13.2) | 64.2 (17.9) | 72.7 (22.6) | 79.3 (26.3) | 82.0 (27.8) | 82.0 (27.8) | 76.8 (24.9) | 66.1 (18.9) | 54.1 (12.3) | 46.6 (8.1) | 64.2 (17.9) |
| Mean daily minimum °F (°C) | 35.1 (1.7) | 38.7 (3.7) | 46.2 (7.9) | 54.7 (12.6) | 63.7 (17.6) | 70.8 (21.6) | 73.4 (23.0) | 72.6 (22.6) | 66.3 (19.1) | 55.4 (13.0) | 44.1 (6.7) | 38.1 (3.4) | 54.9 (12.7) |
| Mean minimum °F (°C) | 19.4 (−7.0) | 24.3 (−4.3) | 29.6 (−1.3) | 39.7 (4.3) | 49.9 (9.9) | 61.9 (16.6) | 66.5 (19.2) | 65.5 (18.6) | 52.7 (11.5) | 39.4 (4.1) | 29.5 (−1.4) | 24.8 (−4.0) | 16.9 (−8.4) |
| Record low °F (°C) | −7 (−22) | −10 (−23) | 14 (−10) | 28 (−2) | 38 (3) | 42 (6) | 51 (11) | 51 (11) | 35 (2) | 24 (−4) | 14 (−10) | 0 (−18) | −10 (−23) |
| Average precipitation inches (mm) | 5.11 (130) | 5.39 (137) | 5.48 (139) | 6.17 (157) | 4.65 (118) | 3.89 (99) | 4.24 (108) | 3.06 (78) | 3.53 (90) | 3.89 (99) | 4.68 (119) | 5.67 (144) | 55.76 (1,418) |
| Average snowfall inches (cm) | 0.4 (1.0) | 0.1 (0.25) | 0.0 (0.0) | 0.0 (0.0) | 0.0 (0.0) | 0.0 (0.0) | 0.0 (0.0) | 0.0 (0.0) | 0.0 (0.0) | 0.0 (0.0) | 0.0 (0.0) | 0.0 (0.0) | 0.5 (1.25) |
| Average precipitation days (≥ 0.01 in) | 10.4 | 10.0 | 11.0 | 9.5 | 9.2 | 8.7 | 9.4 | 7.9 | 6.3 | 7.1 | 9.3 | 11.5 | 110.3 |
| Average snowy days (≥ 0.1 in) | 0.2 | 0.1 | 0.0 | 0.0 | 0.0 | 0.0 | 0.0 | 0.0 | 0.0 | 0.0 | 0.0 | 0.0 | 0.3 |
Source: NOAA

== Demographics ==
Historical population
| Census | Pop. | Note | %± |
|---|---|---|---|
| 1900 | 437 | | — |
| 1910 | 506 | | 15.8% |
| 1920 | 1,600 | | 216.2% |
| 1930 | 1,553 | | −2.9% |
| 1940 | 1,504 | | −3.2% |
| 1950 | 1,749 | | 16.3% |
| 1960 | 1,754 | | 0.3% |
| 1970 | 2,284 | | 30.2% |
| 1980 | 2,358 | | 3.2% |
| 1990 | 2,417 | | 2.5% |
| 2000 | 2,573 | | 6.5% |
| 2010 | 2,405 | | −6.5% |
| 2020 | 1,937 | | −19.5% |
U.S. Decennial Census

=== Racial and ethnic composition ===
Moorhead city, Mississippi – Racial and ethnic composition Note: the US Census treats Hispanic/Latino as an ethnic category. This table excludes Latinos from the racial categories and assigns them to a separate category. Hispanics/Latinos may be of any race.
| Race / Ethnicity (NH = Non-Hispanic) | Pop 2000 | Pop 2010 | Pop 2020 | % 2000 | % 2010 | % 2020 |
|---|---|---|---|---|---|---|
| White alone (NH) | 521 | 393 | 426 | 20.25% | 16.34% | 21.99% |
| Black or African American alone (NH) | 2,012 | 1,977 | 1,443 | 78.20% | 82.20% | 74.50% |
| Native American or Alaska Native alone (NH) | 0 | 8 | 0 | 0.00% | 0.33% | 0.00% |
| Asian alone (NH) | 5 | 5 | 4 | 0.19% | 0.21% | 0.21% |
| Native Hawaiian or Pacific Islander alone (NH) | 0 | 0 | 0 | 0.00% | 0.00% | 0.00% |
| Other race alone (NH) | 0 | 0 | 0 | 0.00% | 0.00% | 0.00% |
| Mixed race or Multiracial (NH) | 3 | 6 | 19 | 0.12% | 0.25% | 0.98% |
| Hispanic or Latino (any race) | 32 | 16 | 45 | 1.24% | 0.67% | 2.32% |
| Total | 2,573 | 2,405 | 1,937 | 100.00% | 100.00% | 100.00% |

=== 2020 census ===
As of the 2020 census, Moorhead had a population of 1,937. The median age was 26.7 years. 21.5% of residents were under the age of 18 and 12.6% of residents were 65 years of age or older. For every 100 females there were 67.4 males, and for every 100 females age 18 and over there were 62.0 males age 18 and over.

0.0% of residents lived in urban areas, while 100.0% lived in rural areas.

There were 602 households in Moorhead, of which 34.7% had children under the age of 18 living in them. Of all households, 22.6% were married-couple households, 21.3% were households with a male householder and no spouse or partner present, and 51.0% were households with a female householder and no spouse or partner present. About 30.2% of all households were made up of individuals and 10.1% had someone living alone who was 65 years of age or older. The city had 313 families.

There were 658 housing units, of which 8.5% were vacant. The homeowner vacancy rate was 2.9% and the rental vacancy rate was 4.2%.

Racial composition as of the 2020 census
| Race | Number | Percent |
|---|---|---|
| White | 431 | 22.3% |
| Black or African American | 1,449 | 74.8% |
| American Indian and Alaska Native | 0 | 0.0% |
| Asian | 4 | 0.2% |
| Native Hawaiian and Other Pacific Islander | 1 | 0.1% |
| Some other race | 33 | 1.7% |
| Two or more races | 19 | 1.0% |

=== 2010 census ===
As of the 2010 United States census, there were 2,405 people living in the city. The racial makeup of the city was 82.2% Black, 16.3% White, 0.3% Native American, 0.2% Asian and 0.2% from two or more races. 0.7% were Hispanic or Latino of any race.

=== 2000 census ===
As of the census of 2000, there were 2,573 people, 688 households, and 520 families living in the city. The population density was 1,988.9 inhabitants per square mile (767.9/km^{2}). There were 720 housing units at an average density of 556.6 per square mile (214.9/km^{2}). The racial makeup of the city was 20.44% White, 78.97% African American, 0.19% Asian, 0.27% from other races, and 0.12% from two or more races. Hispanic or Latino of any race were 1.24% of the population.

There were 8,391 households, out of which 37.6% had children under the age of 18 living with them, 34.7% were married couples living together, 34.7% had a female householder with no husband present, and 24.3% were non-families. 20.3% of all households were made up of individuals, and 9.0% had someone living alone who was 65 years of age or older. The average household size was 3.14 and the average family size was 3.67.

In the city, the population was spread out, with 28.1% under the age of 18, 26.7% from 18 to 24, 21.3% from 25 to 44, 16.3% from 45 to 64, and 7.7% who were 65 years of age or older. The median age was 22 years. For every 100 females, there were 88.8 males. For every 100 females age 18 and over, there were 82.8 males.

The median income for a household in the city was $20,401, and the median income for a family was $23,000. Males had a median income of $26,538 versus $17,697 for females. The per capita income for the city was $8,631. About 32.4% of families and 38.0% of the population were below the poverty line, including 46.3% of those under age 18 and 33.5% of those age 65 or over.

== Arts and culture ==
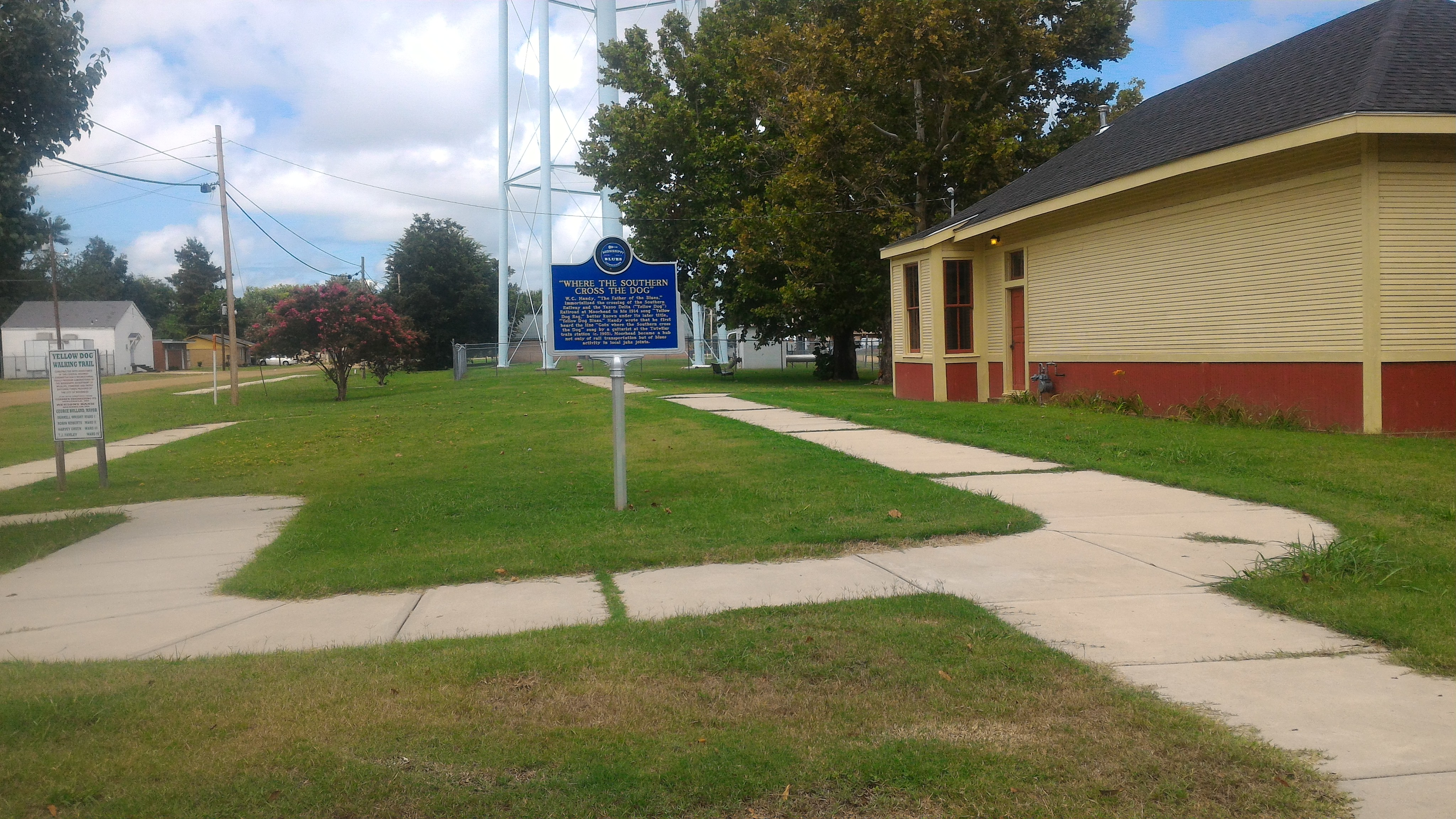
Mississippi Blues Trail marker in downtown Moorhead

A historic plaque in Moorhead is located where the Southern Railroad once crossed the Yazoo Delta Railroad (known as the "Yellow Dog"). The Southern travelled east–west, and later became the Columbus and Greenville Railway, while the Yellow Dog travelled north–south, and later became the Yazoo and Mississippi Valley Railroad. The level junction (diamond) is still preserved as an historic site, though the north–south line has since been abandoned through Moorhead. This railroad crossing is very significant in the history of blues music. It is widely believed that W. C. Handy, after hearing an old man singing about "where the Southern cross the Yellow Dog", was moved by the sound and began what came to be known as the "blues".

== Education ==
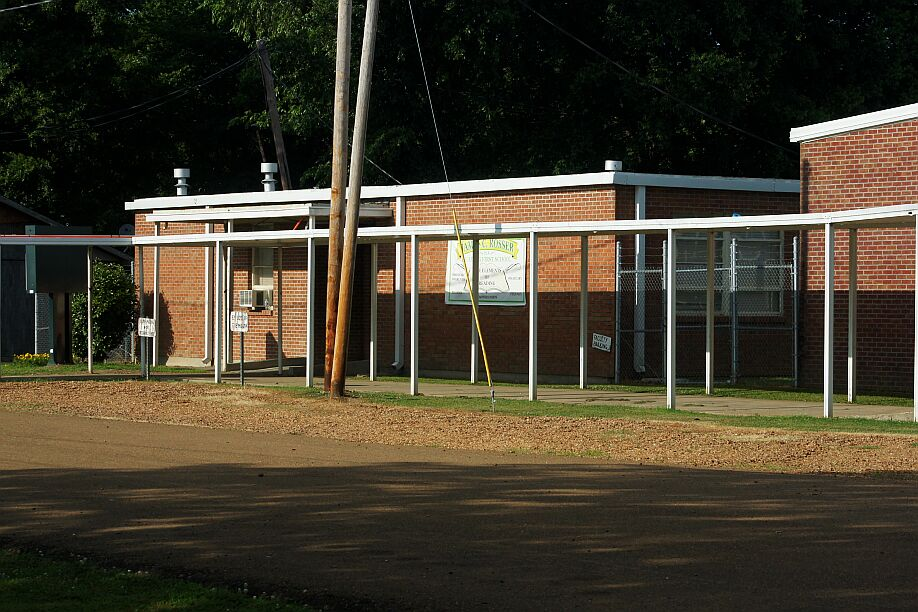
James C. Rosser Elementary School

The City of Moorhead is served by the Sunflower County Consolidated School District (formerly Sunflower County School District). Schools serving Moorhead and in Moorhead include the K-8 school Moorhead Central School, which was formerly Moorhead Middle School until 2018. It also has James C. Rosser Early Learning Center, which was formerly James Rosser Elementary School. As of 2012 it was zoned to Ruleville Central High School (now Thomas E. Edwards, Sr. High School), at the time the sole school of the district.

Moorhead is home to Mississippi Delta Community College's main campus.

The Sunflower County Library operates the Kathy June Sheriff Public Library in Moorhead.

== Notable people ==
- Charley Booker, Delta blues singer
- Phil Bryant, 64th governor of Mississippi from 2012 to 2020
- Johnny Hundley, Negro league outfielder
- Toby Johnson, former professional football defensive tackle
- Chester H. Pond, inventor, railroad developer, and founder of Moorhead
- Johnny Russell, country music songwriter, singer, and comedian
- James R. Stewart, former President-General of the Universal Negro Improvement Association and African Communities League
- Clyde E. Wood, member of the Mississippi House of Representatives from 1968 to 1972
