= Walkin' the Dog =

"Walkin' the dogs"
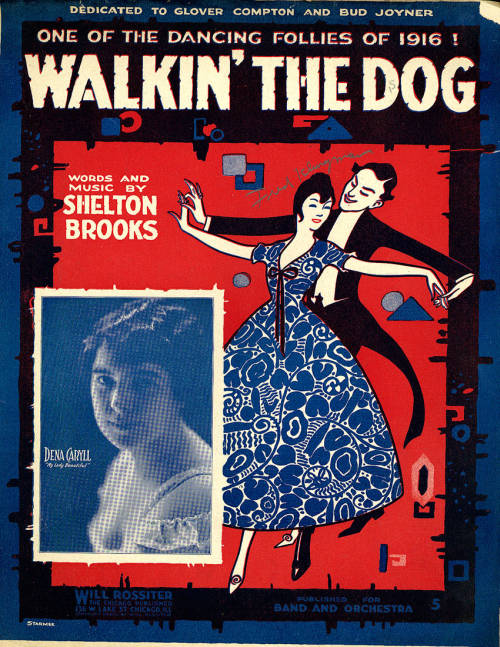
- Sheet music cover, 1916

Song
- Published: 1916
- Genre: Blues
- Songwriter: Shelton Brooks

"Walkin' the Dog" is a song written by Shelton Brooks in 1916. Written for the Dancing Follies of 1916, its chorus is:

Get way back, and snap your fingers
Get over Sally, one and all
Grab your gal, and don't you linger
Do that slow-drag 'round the hall
Do that step, the "Texas Tommy" drop
Like you're sitting on a log
Rise slow, that will show
The dance called Walkin' the Dog

== Bibliography ==
- Brooks, Shelton. "Walkin' the Dog" (Sheet Music). Chicago: Will Rossiter (1916).
