= See See Rider =

Traditional blues song

"See See Rider Blues"

Single by Ma Rainey
- A-side: "Jealous Hearted Blues"
- Released: 1924–1925
- Recorded: October 16, 1924
- Genre: Blues
- Length: 3:16
- Label: Paramount
- Songwriters: Ma Rainey, Lena Arant

Ma Rainey singles chronology
"Booze and Blues" (1924)	"See See Rider Blues" (1924)	"Cell Bound Blues" (1924)

"See See Rider", also known as "C.C. Rider", "See See Rider Blues" or "Easy Rider", is a popular American 12-bar blues song that became a standard in several genres. Gertrude "Ma" Rainey was the first to record it on October 16, 1924, at Paramount Records in New York. The song uses mostly traditional blues lyrics to tell the story of an unfaithful lover, commonly called an "easy rider": "See see rider, see what you have done", making a play on the word "see" and the sound of "easy".

== Background ==
"See See Rider" is a traditional song that may have originated on the black vaudeville circuit. It is similar to "Poor Boy Blues" as performed by Ramblin' Thomas. Jelly Roll Morton recalled hearing the song as a young boy sometime after 1901 in New Orleans, Louisiana, when he performed with a spiritual quartet that played at funerals. Older band members played "See See Rider" during get-togethers with their "sweet mamas" or as Morton called them "fifth-class whores".

Big Bill Broonzy claimed that "when he was about 9 or 10—that is, around 1908, in the Delta (Jefferson County, Arkansas)—he learned to play the blues from an itinerant songster named "See See Rider", "a former slave, who played a one-string fiddle ... one of the first singers of what would later be called the blues." Lead Belly and Blind Lemon Jefferson performed the song in the Dallas-Fort Worth, Texas area between 1912 and 1917.

The song is possibly connected to the Shelton Brooks composition "I Wonder Where My Easy Rider's Gone" (1913) that was inspired by the mysterious 1907 disappearance of the 28-year-old jockey Jimmy Lee, "The Black Demon", a well-known black rider who won every race on the card at Churchill Downs.

== Composition ==
Ma Rainey's rendition of "See See Rider" is based on a traditional folk 12-bar blues, such as the rendition by Lead Belly in which the lyrics follow the traditional repetition of the first line of the stanza structure (AAB). Ma Rainey's rendition opens with the three couplet introduction credited to Lena Arant that explains why the singer is blue. The following lines are adapted in the less typical repetition of the second line of the stanza (ABB) pattern.

Gates Thomas collected a version of "C.C. Rider" in the 1920s in south Texas. It repeated the second line of the stanza (ABB) rather than the first (AAB) which is more common in blues. Folklorists recorded regional variations in stanza patterns such as ABB and ABA in Texas versus AB in New Orleans.

== Renditions ==
In October 1924, "Ma" Rainey was the first to record "See See Rider Blues" at Paramount Records New York Studio. Her Georgia Jazz Band included Louis Armstrong on cornet, Charlie Green on trombone, Buster Bailey on clarinet, Fletcher Henderson on piano, and Charlie Dixon on banjo. The record was released in 1925. While the copyright listed Lena Arant as a composer, she was responsible only for the first three rhymed couplets at the beginning of the song.

In 1943, a version by Wee Bea Booze reached number one on Billboard magazine's Harlem Hit Parade, a precursor of the rhythm and blues chart. Some blues critics consider this to be the definitive version of the song. Later rock-oriented versions were recorded by Chuck Willis (as "C.C. Rider", a number one R&B hit and a number 12 pop hit in 1957) and LaVern Baker (number nine R&B and number 34 pop in 1963).

Canadian folk duo Ian & Sylvia recorded a version of the song for their 1962 self-titled debut album.

Mitch Ryder & the Detroit Wheels' version of the song (as part of the medley "Jenny Take a Ride!") from their album Take a Ride reached number 10 on the Billboard Hot 100 chart in 1965 in the US.

In 1966, the Animals recorded "See See Rider" for their fourth American album, Animalization. It was released as a single in September 1966 and reached number 10 on the Hot 100. Cash Box said that it is an "excellent re-working" in which the Animals play "the bluesy sturdie in an infectious, hard-pounding rollicking style."

Yugoslav rock band Kameleoni recorded a cover of the Animals version for their 1967 debut EP Le Felicita.

Elvis Presley recorded a version of the song in 1970. The song eventually became Presley's opening song at his concerts beginning in 1972, with the orchestral section of his rendition opening and closing the concerts and appeared on his live album On Stage. This rendition eventually would also be used in a Finnish television series Pulkkinen through Elvis-imitation as the opening and closing song of each episode, where the radio-DJ "Osmo" would refer this song as "Äshönsii".

The Grateful Dead played the song live starting in 1979, with Bob Weir on vocals.

Old Crow Medicine Show included a rendition on their 2004 self-titled album.

Van Dyke Parks adapted some of the lyrics for "Do You Like Worms", a track from the Beach Boys' unreleased 1967 album SMiLE, changing it to "bicycle rider, just see what you done", instead of "see see rider".

== Recognition and influence ==
In 2004, Ma Rainey's "See See Rider" was selected for the National Recording Registry of the Library of Congress to preserve its legacy for future generations. In 2004, her recording received a Grammy Hall of Fame Award. Film director Martin Scorsese credited the song with stimulating his interest in music. He commented:

One day, around 1958, I remember hearing something that was unlike anything I'd ever heard before ... The music was demanding, "Listen to me!" ... The song was called "See See Rider," which I already knew from the Chuck Willis cover version. The name of the singer was Lead Belly ... I found an old Folkways record by Lead Belly ... And I listened to it obsessively. Lead Belly's music opened something up for me. If I could have played guitar, really played it, I never would have become a filmmaker.

In 2018, the Blues Foundation inducted "See See Rider" into the Blues Hall of Fame as a "classic of blues recording". The induction statement noted that the song "became a standard recorded by countless artists in many genres [with] hit singles [and] many other versions by blues, soul, jazz, pop, country, and rock performers". It is also specifically recognized as a blues standard.

John "Big Nig" Bray, the leader of a crew that hauled cypress logs from Louisiana swamps in the 1930s, borrowed the frame and tune of "See See Rider" for his "Trench Blues" (1934), a semi-autobiographical heroic blues ballad recounting the experience of an African American soldier in World War I, as recorded by Alan Lomax. "See See Rider" was among the most known African American play party songs in Alabama in the 1950s.

== Origins of the term ==
There are many theories and conjectures about the origin and meaning of the title; none of them have been proven correct, and the song's complex history may make proof impossible. Performers have interpreted the song in more than one way, and have sometimes changed words to suit their interpretations.

The spelling See See Rider might be a pronunciation spelling of "C. C. Rider". Many sources indicate that "c. c. rider" refers to either early "church circuit" traveling preachers who did not have established churches or "county circuit" riders who were attorneys following a circuit judge. Debra Devi, a researcher of the language of the blues, recorded a hypothesis that during the American Civil War C.C. stood for Cavalry Corporal, a horseman officer. "Riding" is also a common metaphor for sexual intercourse in the blues, and "rider" a term for a sexual partner. In African American usage a "rider" can be either male or female. This folk etymology appears to stem from somebody by the name Alex Washburn who came across this interpretation of "c.c. rider" in a folk song collection by Alan Lomax, a prominent American field researcher of folk music.

The term see see rider is sometimes taken as synonymous with easy rider (an unscrupulous man living off his lover's earnings). In dirty blues songs, "easy rider" can also refer to a woman who had liberal sexual views, had been married more than once, or was skilled at sex. Likewise, in jazz singer and guitarist Wee Bea Booze's version of "See See Rider Blues", which reached number one on the US Billboard R&B chart in 1943, the well audible lyrics are "now your girl come", hence addressing a man. Another theory is that the term could refer to a prostitute and there would be a lyric such as "You made me love you, now your man done come", "your man" would refer to the woman's pimp. In this interpretation, rather than being directed to a male "easy rider", the song would be an admonition to a prostitute to give up her evil ways.

There are further theories:

- Easy rider was sometimes used to refer to the partner of a hypersexual woman who therefore does not have to work or pay for sex.
- Easy rider sometimes referred to the guitar hung across the back of a travelling blues singer.
- Big Bill Broonzy states, on his album Big Bill Broonzy (recorded in Baarn, the Netherlands, early 1956 and released late 1956), that the first time he heard that song was by a man who "loved to be on the water, and that's why he wrote this title, and that's the title of the song: it's 'Sea Sea Rider'".
- Big Bill Broonzy also states, in a conversation about his youth with Bill Randle on his album The Bill Broonzy Story (recorded on July 12, 1957), that See See Rider was a blues singer (AVID Roots, Classic Box Set, AMSC1159) before playing the tune.

== See also ==
- "I Wonder Where My Easy Rider's Gone"
- R&B number-one hits of 1943 (USA)
