= Johnny Hundley =

American baseball player

- Outfielder
- Born: October 19, 1914; Moorhead, Mississippi, U.S.
- Died: April 9, 1986 (aged 71)
- Batted: Right Threw: Right

Negro league baseball debut
- 1943, for the Cleveland Buckeyes

Last appearance
- 1946, for the Chicago American Giants
- Stats at Baseball Reference

Teams
- Cleveland Buckeyes (1943); Chicago American Giants (1946)

Johnny Lee Hundley (October 19, 1914 – April 9, 1986) was an American Negro league outfielder in the 1940s.

A native of Moorhead, Mississippi, Hundley made his Negro leagues debut in 1943 with the Cleveland Buckeyes. In 30 recorded games for Cleveland that season, he posted 26 hits and 10 RBI in 109 plate appearances. Hundley served in the US Army during World War II, and after the war played briefly for the Chicago American Giants in 1946. He died in 1986 at age 71.
