= Yazoo Delta Railroad =

Railroad branch line in Mississippi, USA

The Yazoo-Delta Railroad (sometimes known as the "Yellow Dog") was a branch line that opened in August 1897 between Moorhead and Ruleville, Mississippi. It was extended to Tutwiler, Mississippi, and Lake Dawson and was acquired by the Yazoo and Mississippi Railroad by 1903.

== Possible origins of the nickname ==
One theory is that the nickname came about because of the initials Y.D. on locomotives.

An alternative is that the nickname applied originally to the Yazoo and Mississippi railroad and that was later applied to the Yazoo-Delta railroad.

Historian Paul Oliver claims that in Rome, Mississippi, "they declared that it was named after a mongrel hound that noisily greeted every train as it passed through".

== Blues connections ==
W. C. Handy wrote about his first experience of the blues when he encountered a blues musician in Tutwiler, Mississippi, on this line.

Big Bill Broonzy's "The Southern Blues" contains the line "where the Southern crosses the Dog", referring to Moorhead, Mississippi, where the line crossed the Southern Railway.

Scrapper Blackwell's song "Goin' Where the Monon Crosses the Yellow Dog" also references the Monon Railroad in Indiana. The two lines do not actually meet.

== In popular culture ==
The Yazoo Delta or "Yellow Dog" Railway plays an integral part in August Wilson's Pulitzer Prize-winning 1987 play The Piano Lesson. In 1965 Memphis artist Carroll Cloar painted Where the Southern Cross the Yellow Dog. The painting is held by the Memphis Brooks Art Museum.

== See also ==
- Chester H. Pond - founder
