= Yazoo and Mississippi Valley Railroad =

American railroad in Tennessee, Mississippi, and Louisiana

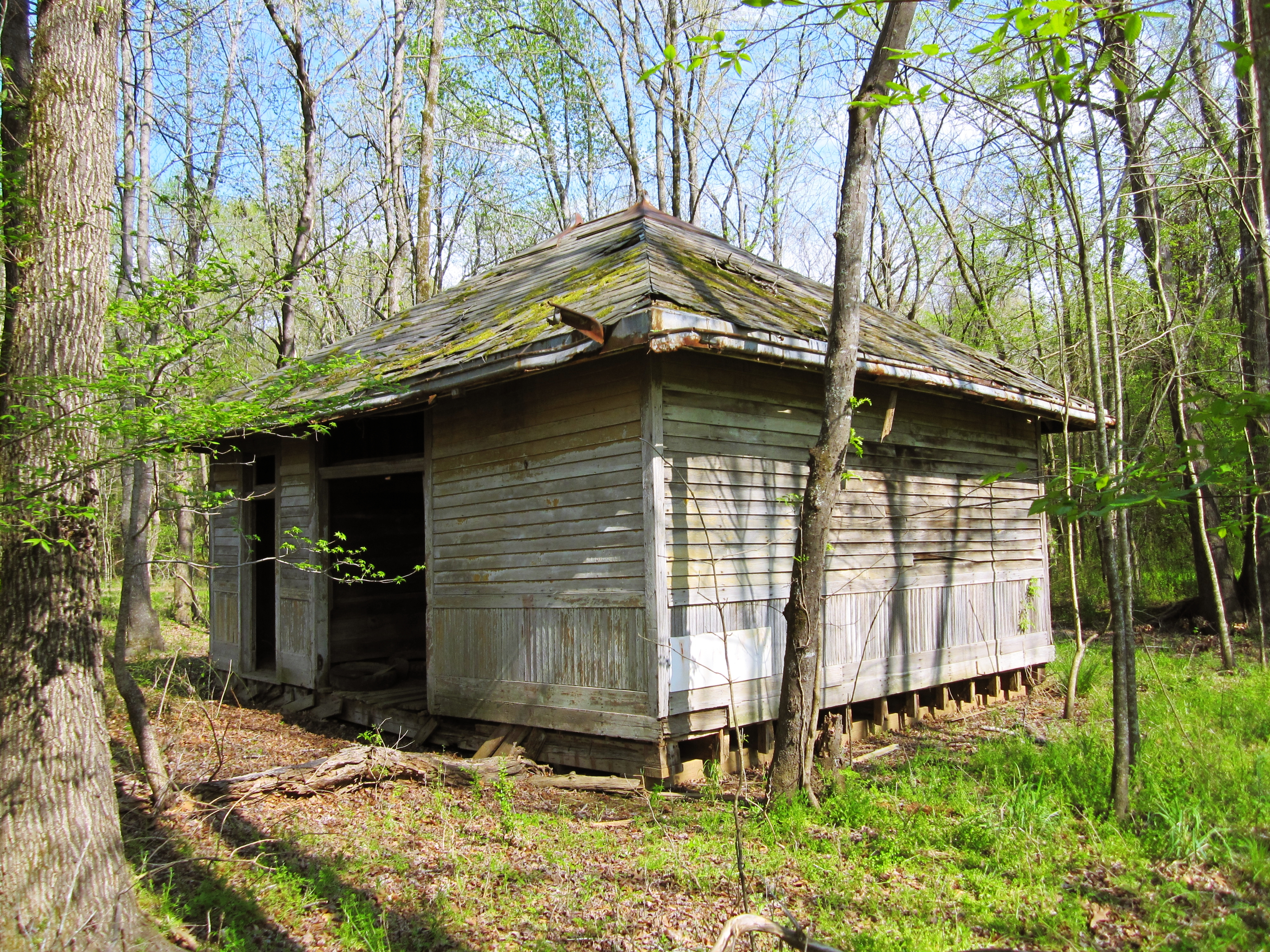
- Abandoned Yazoo and Mississippi Valley building in Grenada County, Mississippi (2011)

Overview
- Headquarters: Chicago, Illinois
- Locale: Memphis, Tennessee to New Orleans, Louisiana
- Dates of operation: 1882–1946

Technical
- Track gauge: 4 ft 8 1/2 in (1,435 mm) standard gauge

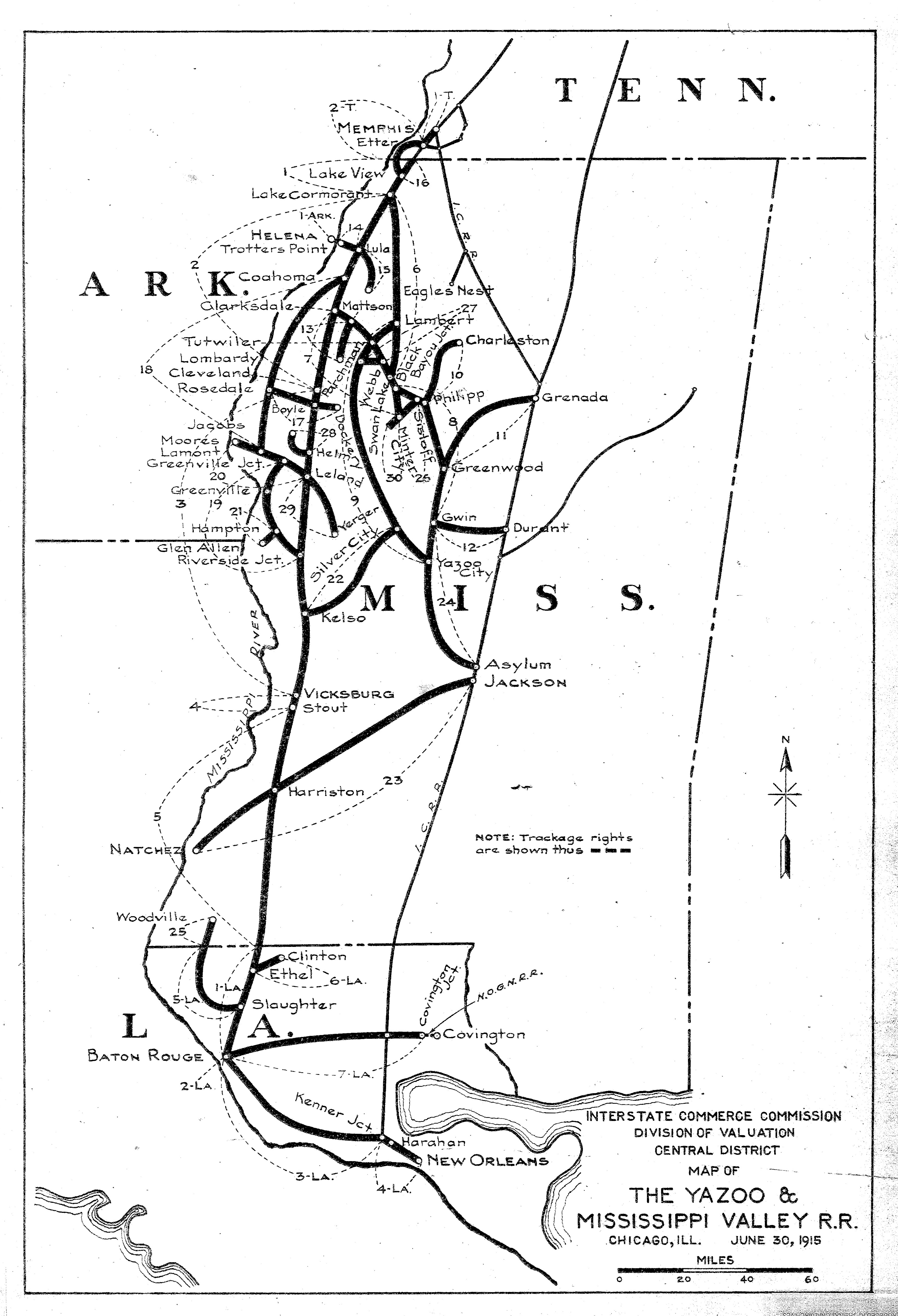
1915 map of the railroad

The Yazoo and Mississippi Valley Railroad (Y&MV) was incorporated in 1882 and was part of the Illinois Central Railroad system (IC). Construction began in Jackson, Mississippi, and continued to Yazoo City, Mississippi. The line was later expanded through the Mississippi Delta and on to Memphis, Tennessee. In 1886, the IC purchased the Mississippi and Tennessee Railroad. In 1892, the IC bought the Memphis to New Orleans line, forming the Louisville, New Orleans and Texas Railway. These lines were merged into the Y&MV. Main lines included Memphis to New Orleans via Vicksburg and Baton Rouge, Memphis to Tutwiler, Clarksdale, MS to Yazoo City, Clarksdale to Jackson, MS, and Jackson to Natchez.

Between 1945 and 1946, the IC began to absorb its subsidiaries. The Yazoo and Mississippi Valley Railroad ceased to operate as an independent railroad. Later railroad restructuring ended passenger service on this line.

== Blues music ==
The railroad — or its predecessor, the Yazoo Delta Railway (Moorhead–Ruleville) — is featured in a number of blues songs by African-American artists as the Yellow Dog Railroad. According to W. C. Handy, locals assigned the words "Yellow Dog" to the letters Y.D. on the freight trains which they saw passing.

The Mississippi Blues Commission placed a historic marker at the Yazoo and Mississippi Valley Railroad depot site in Rosedale, Mississippi, designating it as a site on the Mississippi Blues Trail. The marker commemorates the original lyrics of legendary blues artist Robert Johnson's "Traveling Riverside Blues," which traced the route of the Y&MV. It ran south from Friars Point to Vicksburg, with stops including Rosedale; and north to Memphis. The marker emphasizes a common theme of blues songs of riding on the railroad, which is seen as a metaphor for escape.

== See also ==
- Yazoo & Mississippi Depot in Baton Rouge, Louisiana
- Yazoo & Mississippi Depot in Clarksdale, Mississippi
