= Shelton Brooks =

Canadian-American composer of popular music and jazz (1886–1975)

- Born: May 4, 1886; Amherstburg, Ontario, Canada
- Died: September 6, 1975 (aged 89); Los Angeles County, California, U.S.
- Occupations: Popular music and jazz composer

Shelton Brooks (May 4, 1886 – September 6, 1975) was a Canadian-born American composer and performer of popular music and jazz. He was known for his ragtime and vaudeville style, and wrote some of the biggest hits of the first third of the 20th century; including "Some of These Days" and "At the Darktown Strutters' Ball". He composed "Some of These Days" at the Pekin Theatre.

== Early life and education ==
Brooks was born in Amherstburg, Canada in 1886. His father Peter Brooks was a preacher who moved the family to North Buxton in 1892, when Shelton was six years old, after becoming pastor at the British Methodist Episcopal Church in that town. It was here that Brooks taught himself music, on the church's pump organ. It also gave him his first experience performing for an audience, and his first recognition as a talented musician.

His family moved to Detroit, Michigan, in 1901 and that was where Brooks first made a name for himself in music and comedy. While he never learned to read music, his works were highly sought after for their brash style, which contrasted the previous restrictive styles of Victorian era music. Towards the end of his life, his style of music had lost popularity.

== Career ==
Brooks sang, played piano, and performed on the vaudeville circuit (notably, as a Bert Williams imitator) as well as having a successful songwriting career. His first hit song was "Some of These Days", which he was able to get to headliner Sophie Tucker in 1909. Tucker adopted it as her theme song, and performed it regularly for the next 55 years.

He starred in several 1920s musical comedies. He appeared in the cast of Lew Leslie's Plantation Revue, which was opened in 1922. After the sudden death of his partner Florence Mills in 1927, he stopped appearing in stage shows and pursued a nightclub act. He had a radio show on the CBS network in the 1930s, and he is also credited as a contributor to the music featured in the 1932 film Harlem Is Heaven. In the 1940s he became a regular in Ken Murray's "Blackouts", a long-running salute to burlesque that played in both New York and Los Angeles, California.

Brooks sang and provided piano accompaniments on records with vocalists Ethel Waters and Sara Martin.

== Discography ==
Brooks' works include "Some of These Days", "At the Darktown Strutters' Ball", "I Wonder Where My Easy Rider's Gone", "Every Day", "Somewhere in France", "Swing That Thing", "That Man of Mine", and "There'll Come a Time".

He also composed "Honey Gal, You Aint Talkin' to Me" and "If I Were a Bee and You Were a Red, Red Rose".

=== Partial list of songs ===
- 1909 "You ain't talkin' to me"
- 1910 "Honey Gal"
- 1910 "Some of These Days"
- 1911 "Jean"
- 1911 "There'll come a time"
- 1912 "You ain't no place but down South"
- 1912 "All Night Long"
- 1913 "I wonder where my easy rider's gone"
- 1916 "Walkin' the Dog"
- 1916 "Darktown Strutters' Ball"
- 1917 "Somewhere-Somewhere in France" (with William Vaughan Dunham)
- 1919 "Jean" (popularized by Isham Jones)
- 1919 "Tell Me Why You Want to Go to Paree (You Can Get the Same Sweet Loving Here at Home)"

== Accolades ==
Brooks was inducted as a legacy musician and songwriter into the Chatham-Kent Cultural Hall of Fame in 2025.
