= Easy rider (slang) =

American slang expression with various meanings

Easy rider is an archaic United States slang expression whose meaning has varied with time.

== History ==
=== Origins ===
Easy rider originally meant an expert horseman or a horse that was easy to ride.

=== 1900s ===
In the early 1900s the term took on the meaning of freeloader as found in the old song "We Don't Care What Mr. Crump Don't Allow", based on "We Don't Care What Mama Don't Allow":

Mr. Crump won't 'low no easy riders here,
Mr. Crump won't 'low no easy riders here,
We don't care what Mr. Crump don't 'low,
We goin' to bar'l-house anyhow—
Mr. Crump can go and catch hisself some air!

"Easy rider" in blues came to denote a lover, male or female. If it refers to a man, it usually implies he is unscrupulous, is a prostitute's lover and lives off her earnings. It can also mean a male lover whose movements are easy and satisfying.

The term also referred to a woman who had liberal sexual views, had been married more than once, or someone skilled at sex. The term appears in numerous blues lyrics of the 1920s and many popular early folk-blues tunes such as "See See Rider", first recorded by Ma Rainey in 1924, and later recorded by Lightnin' Hopkins when with Aladdin Records. Early uses of the term include the 1925 jazz recording by Johnny Bayersdorffer's Jazzola Novelty Orchestra entitled "I Wonder Where My Easy Rider's Riding Now" (later covered by Mae West) and "Mama Don't Allow No Easy Riders Here" in 1929 by Tampa Red.

=== Great Depression ===
During the Great Depression a large population of Americans driven by poverty rode the railroad system and the term easy rider (along with hobo and bum) found its way into slang vocabulary to mean a slow moving train and the men that, even after the great depression, continued to live and travel along the rails. The majority of these trains, commissioned in the early 1920s, had the letters C.C. (for Colorado Central) or S.C. (for Southern Coastal) stenciled on them in bold white letters. This is most likely where the term C.C. rider originated.

=== World War II ===
In the World War II era the slang term re-emerged with a modified meaning, where G.I.s on extended deployment in Asia or Europe (unofficially) employed children to perform the daily mundane tasks so common in the military like tending to barracks, shining boots, and the like, so a G.I. who employed a houseboy coasted through this work and had an "easy ride".

Eventually young native women were hired to tend to individual living quarters and soon became lovers as well as maids.

When these men left and other G.I.s took their place, the women, accustomed to the workload, would remain to perform the same services, sometimes preparing gear or a living area for inspection better than the soldier could.

=== 1960s ===
The term had a different meaning in the "free love" cultural era of the 1960s and was first applied to women who practiced free love. A man who lived with this type of woman had a free or easy ride, since the woman still did most of the chores even though Second-wave feminism began to have a major influence on women at this time.

The term soon acquired a negative connotation however as it became a derogatory way to describe a woman with whom a hippie could live, then leave abruptly and who would not get angry if he came back later. Soon it was applied to prostitutes whom it was easy to fool or steal from or who simply traded their charms for a small amount of food or drugs.

== Effects on entertainment ==
The term appears in the famous "See See Rider Blues" song recorded by Ma Rainey in 1925. The song and others like it used the loneliness of a rider of the rails or wanderer as a theme in their music.

The 1969 movie Easy Rider was in 1967 initially conceived as The Loners with Hopper directing, Fonda producing, and both starring and writing. They brought in Texan screenwriter Terry Southern, who came up with the new title, even though others claim credit, too. The film had wandering motorcycle riders as its characters, and due to the notoriety of the movie the term again acquired another meaning to fit into the cultural mores of the time, to mean Harley-Davidson chopper motorcycles and their riders.

Dennis Hopper, the director of Easy Rider, said in its making-of documentary Shaking the Cage: "An easy rider is a person that is not a pimp, but he lives off a woman; he lives off a whore. He's her easy rider. He's the one that she loves and she gives money to. He doesn't pimp her, but he's her easy rider."

Led Zeppelin, although a rock band, was heavily influenced by early jazz and blues and make reference in numerous songs to an "easy rider." Most notably the song "Out on the Tiles" makes reference to this free love practice and the cultural impact of it as he is both proud and ashamed to be seen with a woman known to be an "easy rider" while at the same time trying to hitchhike a ride.

After his music was used in the motion picture soundtrack of Easy Rider, Jimi Hendrix was inspired to write the song "Ezy Ryder", on his album The Cry of Love originally released in 1971. Already in 1970, "Easy Rider (Let the Wind Pay the Way)" from the album Metamorphosis was Iron Butterfly's second biggest hit.
