= Chester H. Pond =

American inventor

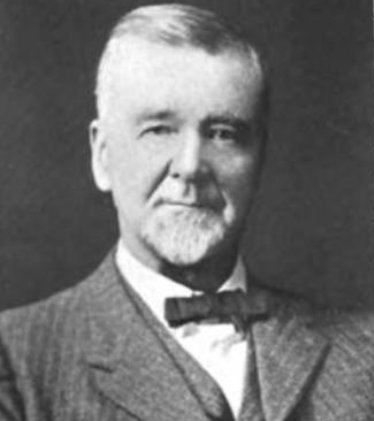
Chester H. Pond, 1912

Chester H. Pond (March 26, 1844 – June 11, 1912) was an American inventor. He invented many devices used in telegraphy. In later life he was a railroad developer. He also founded the town of Moorhead, Mississippi.

== Death ==
Pond died at Moorhead on June 11, 1912.
