= Downtown Loveland Historic District =

Historic district in Colorado, United States

- U.S. National Register of Historic Places
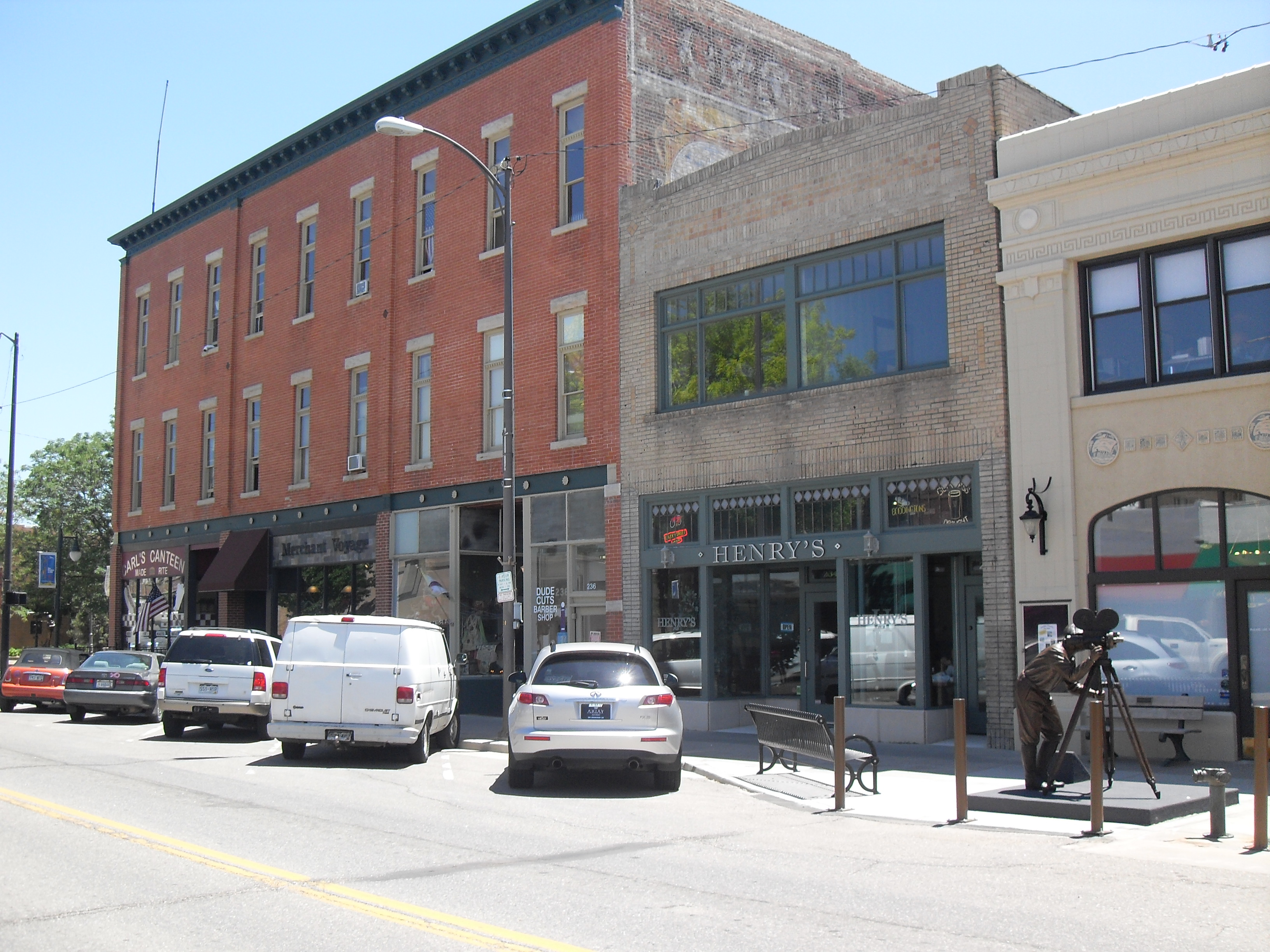
- Buildings on 4th St. in 2010

- Location within Colorado
- Location: Roughly bounded by Railroad & Jefferson Aves., alley between 3rd & 4th Sts., alley between 4th & 5th Sts., Loveland, Colorado
- Coordinates: 40°23′44″N 105°04′27″W
- Area: 18 acres (7.3 ha)
- Built: 1877
- NRHP reference No.: 15000281
- Added to NRHP: June 1, 2015

The Downtown Loveland Historic District in Loveland, Colorado is an 18 acres (7.3 ha) historic district which was listed on the National Register of Historic Places in 2015. It includes Loveland's commercial center which began in 1877, developed first as a railroad town, and then became an agricultural center and a regional center of government and commerce.

The district includes portions of 4th Street, Loveland's main commercial avenue, from Railroad Avenue to Jefferson Avenue.

It includes 45 contributing buildings and a contributing object, as well as 13 non-contributing buildings and nine non-contributing objects. It includes:

- Loveland Street Clock (1910), the one contributing object, manufactured by the Brown Street Clock Company of Monessen, Pennsylvania, located in front of Brannan Brothers Jewelry Store (1886), 239 East 4th Street, now "Garment Gal's", at 40.39553°N 105.07357°W;
- Rialto Theater, 228 East 4th Street, separately NRHP-listed in 1988;
- Lovelander Hotel / BPOE Elks Lodge 1051 (1912–13), 103-117 East 4th Street, three stories;
- Union Block / Lincoln Hotel, 236-248 East 4th Street, three stories;
- Majestic Theatre / I. O. O. F. Hall, 315-319 East 4th Street, three stories;
- Colorado and Southern Railway Depot, 409-427 N. Railroad Avenue, separately NRHP-listed in 1988;
- State Mercantile Building/Masonic Temple (1910), at 202, 204, 206, 210 East 4th Street. Two-story building constructed of pressed white brick, with a newer red brick veneer. Parapeted.

== See also ==
- National Register of Historic Places listings in Larimer County, Colorado
