= William Stromberg Clock =

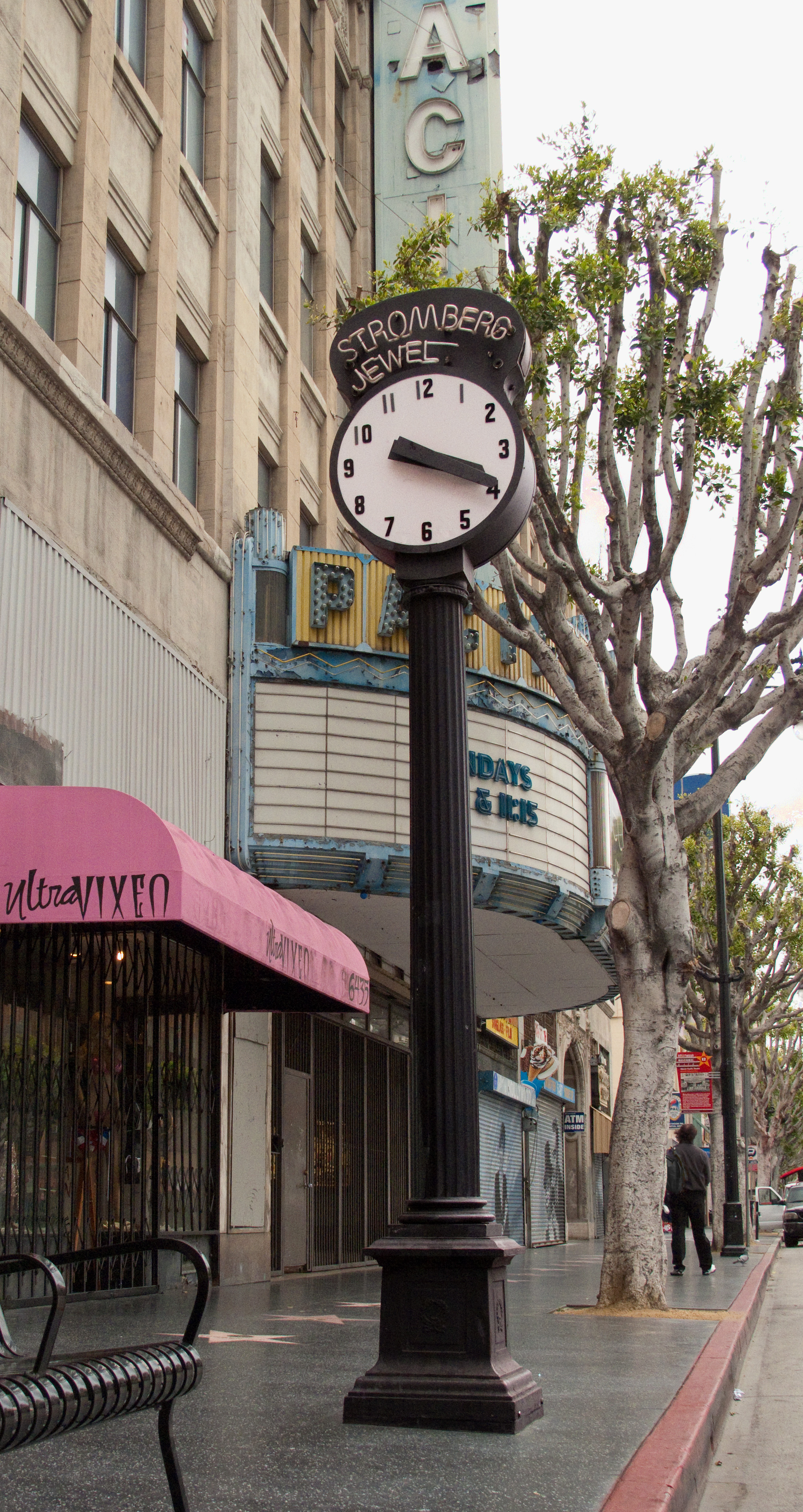
- The clock outside Hollywood Pacific Theatre in 2012
- Interactive map of William Stromberg Clock
- Location: 6435 Hollywood Boulevard, Hollywood, California 90028
- Coordinates: 34.102°N 118.330°W
- Type: street clock
- Completion date: 1947

Los Angeles Historic-Cultural Monument
- Designated: January 7, 1987
- Reference no.: 316

William Stromberg Clock is a street clock located at 6435 Hollywood Boulevard in Hollywood, California, outside the former William Stromberg Jewelry store.

== History ==
The first William Stromberg Clock in Hollywood was built beside Warner Hollywood Theatre c. 1929 to promote William Stromberg's new jewelry store located in the building. The clock has changed designs several times since then, with the current design dating back to the 1980s.

The clock was declared Los Angeles Historic-Cultural Monument No. 316 in 1987. It is one of only three historic street clocks that remain in Los Angeles, and it no longer works, with the west side stopped on 4:20 and the east side on 3:17.

== In popular culture ==
The clock was often captured on film in car chases scenes made during the silent era. It was also featured in The Grifters.
