= Street clock =

Type of clock

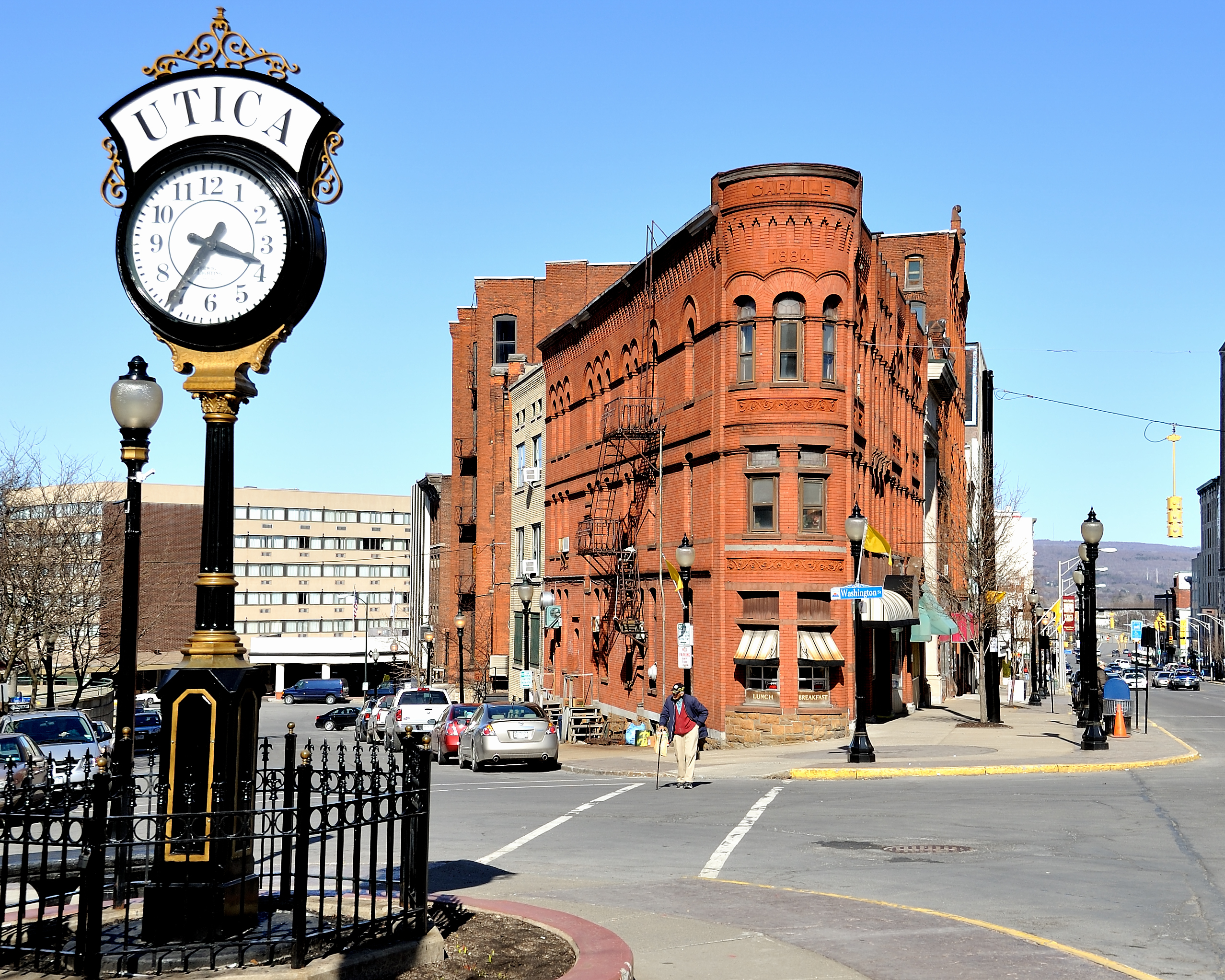
Street clock in Utica, New York, USA

A street clock or post clock is a clock mounted on top of a post typically installed in a streetscape or other urban or park setting.

== History ==
A less common kind of street clock can be found on Maiden Lane in Manhattan, New York. In the late 19th century, William Barthman Jewelers had a clock embedded in the sidewalk. As of 2014, the clock remains visible and maintained.

== Manufacturers ==
=== Past street clock manufacturers in the United States ===
- E. Howard & Co.
- Brown Street Clock Company
- Seth Thomas Clock Company
- Self Winding Clock Company – produced public clocks including street clocks; one surviving example was later restored by the Electric Time Company.
- Joseph Mayer & Bros. (Seattle, Washington)
- O.B. McClintock Company (Minneapolis, Minnesota)

=== Current street clock manufacturers in the United States ===
- Electric Time Company
- The Verdin Company
- Tower Clocks USA

== Examples ==
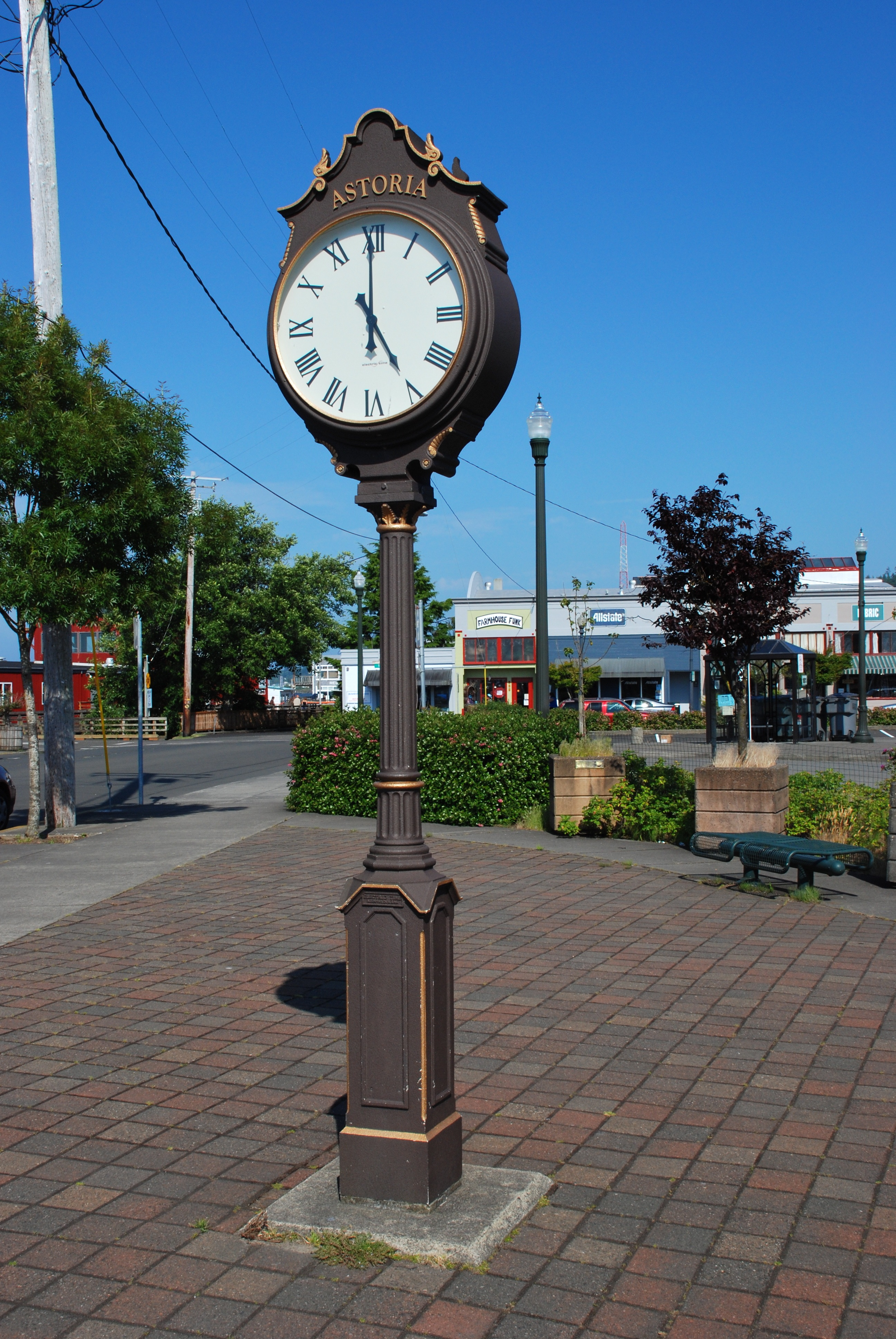
In Astoria, Oregon

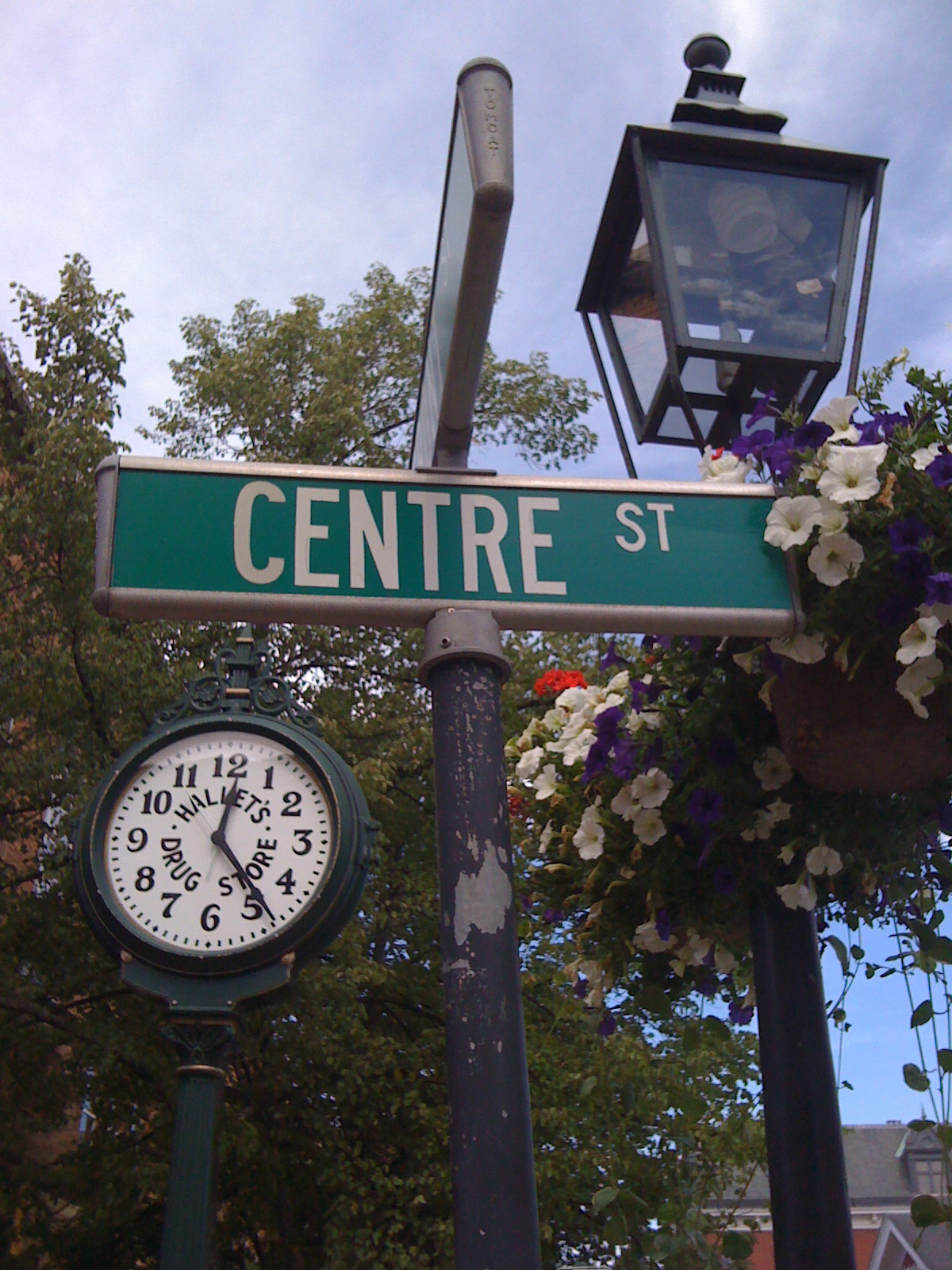
Built in Boston, Massachusetts, by Seth Thomas Clock Company in 1911, it was moved to Bath, Maine, in 1915

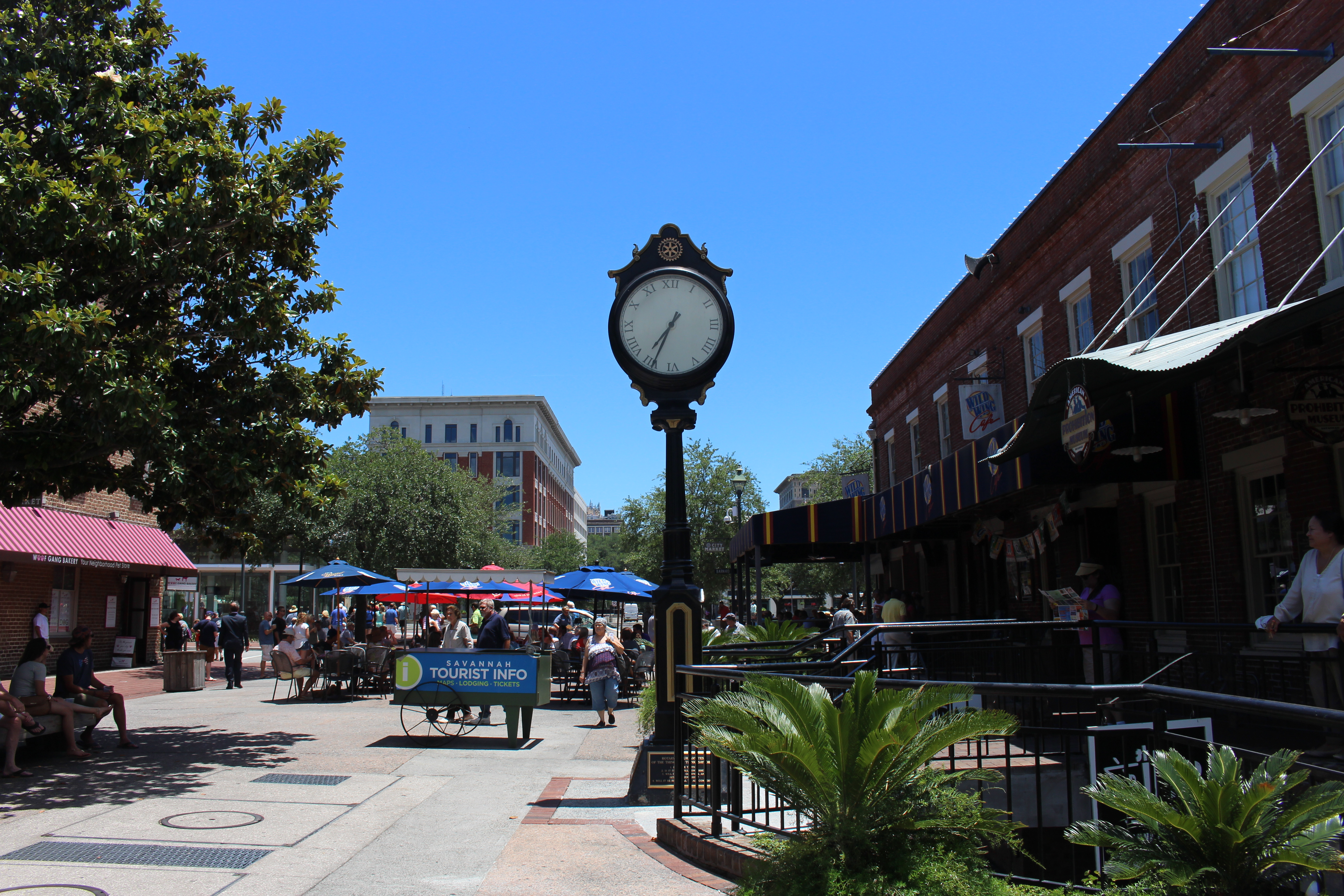
In Ellis Square, Savannah, Georgia

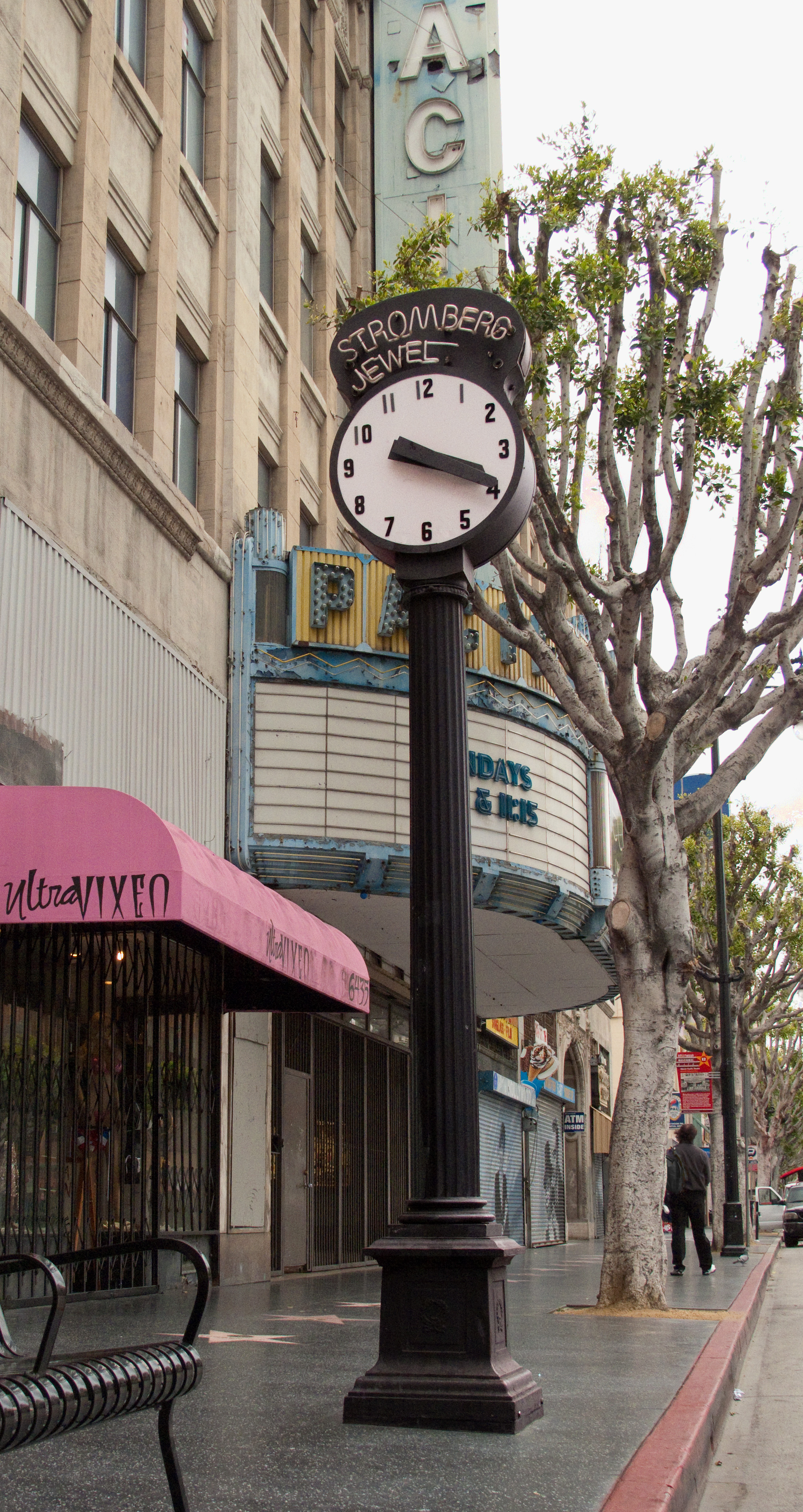
William Stromberg Clock on Hollywood Boulevard in Hollywood, California

== See also ==
- Clock tower
