= Loveland station (Colorado) =

- Colorado and Southern Railway Depot
- U.S. National Register of Historic Places
- U.S. Historic district – Contributing property
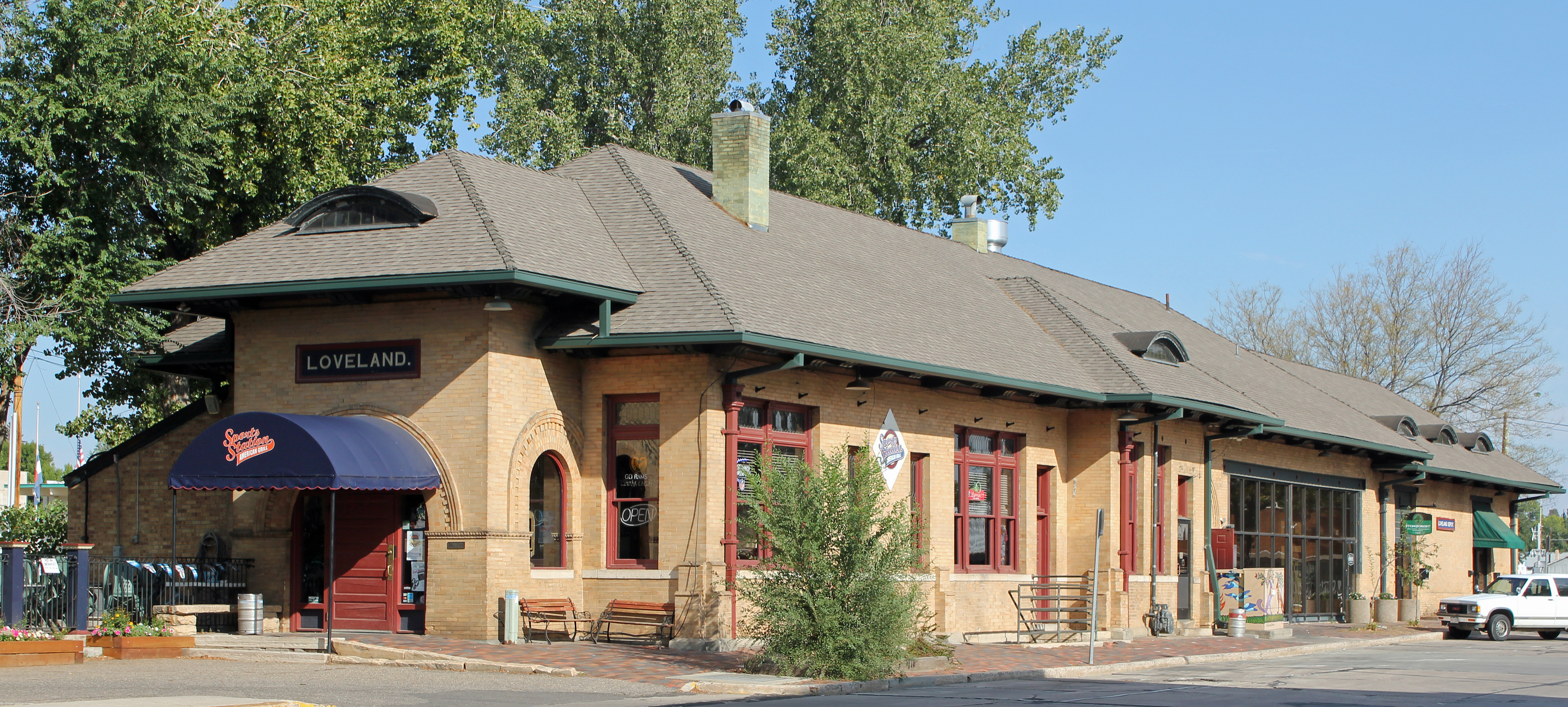
- Depot in 2012

- Location within Colorado
- Location: 405 Railroad Ave., Loveland, Colorado
- Coordinates: 40°23′46″N 105°04′31″W
- Area: less than one acre
- Built: 1902
- Architect: C.B. Martin
- Part of: Downtown Loveland Historic District (ID15000281)
- NRHP reference No.: 82002303

Significant dates
- Added to NRHP: June 14, 1982
- Designated CP: June 1, 2015

The Colorado and Southern Railway Depot in Loveland, Colorado was built in 1902 as replacement to a former depot built in 1878. It was listed on the National Register of Historic Places in 1982.

It is located at 405 Railroad Ave. in Loveland, or at 409-427 N. Railroad Avenue, and has also been known as the Loveland Depot.

It was designed by Charles B. Martin, a Colorado and Southern architect. It was built at cost of $19,949.

The depot is 175 by 37 feet (53 m × 11 m) in plan, was built of buff-colored brick, and has three sections: "a passenger depot at the southern end, a narrower freight depot at the northern end, and a large formerly open porch in the center." Brick from the old depot being replaced was used to pave walkways and the platform of the new depot.

It is described as "Romanesque Revival in its detailing with the arch used within and without as a decorative motif. The main entrance to the passenger depot is on the South end of the building through an open vestibule with arched openings on three sides."

It was also included as a contributing building in the Downtown Loveland Historic District, NRHP-listed in 2015.
