= Telechron =

American clock manufacturing company

- Formerly: The Warren Clock Company
- Industry: Electric clocks
- Founded: 1912
- Founder: Henry E. Warren
- Defunct: 1992
- Headquarters: Ashland, Massachusetts, U.S.

Telechron was an American company that manufactured electric clocks between 1912 and 1992. "Telechron" is derived from the Greek words tele, meaning "far off," and chronos, "time," thus referring to the transmission of time over long distances. Founded by Henry Ellis Warren, Telechron introduced the synchronous electric clock, which keeps time by the oscillations of the alternating current electricity that powers it from the electric power grid. Telechron had its heyday between 1925 and 1955, when it sold millions of electric clocks to American consumers.

== Henry Warren: the synchronous motor and the master clock ==
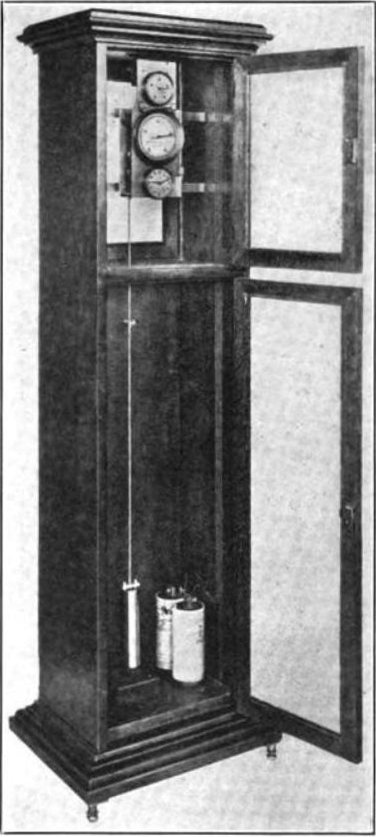
Warren master clock, installed in utility power plants, made accurate synchronous clocks possible.

Henry E. Warren established the company in 1912 in Ashland, Massachusetts. Initially, it was called "The Warren Clock Company," producing battery-powered clocks. These proved unreliable, however, since batteries weakened quickly, which resulted in inaccurate time-keeping. Warren saw electric motors as the solution to this problem. In 1915, he invented a self-starting synchronous motor consisting of a rotor and a coil, which was patented in 1918. A synchronous motor spins at the same rate as the cycle of the alternating current driving it. Synchronous electric clocks had been available previously, but had to be started manually. In later years, Telechron would advertise its clocks as "bringing true time," because power plants had begun to maintain frequency of the alternating current very close to an average of 60 Hz.

But such constancy did not yet exist when Warren first experimented with his synchronous motors. Irregularities in the frequency of the alternating current led not only to inaccurate time-keeping but, more seriously, to incompatible power grids in the United States, as power could not readily be transferred from one grid to another. In order to overcome these problems, Warren invented a "master clock," which he installed at the Boston Edison Company in 1916.

This master clock had two movements, one driven by a synchronous motor connected to the current produced by the power plant, the other driven by a traditional spring and pendulum. The pendulum was adjusted twice a day in accordance with time signals received from the Naval Observatory. As long as the hands of the electric clock, powered by a 60 Hz synchronous motor, moved along perfectly with those of the "traditional" clock, the power produced by the electric company was uniform. In Electrifying Time, Jim Linz writes that "in 1947, Warren Master Clocks regulated over 95 percent of the electric lines in the United States."

It is interesting to note, then, that the uniformity of alternating current in the United States, which was necessary in order to build large power grids, was initially ensured by a very traditional clock system. Furthermore, Henry Warren invented his master clock at first simply in order to guarantee that his synchronous clock motor would provide accurate time.

== Telechron and Art Deco ==
The Telechron company's success from the 1920s into the 1950s was not solely due to the technical advantages of their clocks, although all Telechron clocks were powered by successive versions of Henry Warren's synchronous motor. Rather, the Telechron company sought to produce clocks whose designs reflected one of the fundamental principles of the Art Deco movement: to combine modern engineering (including mass-production) with the beauty of simple geometric shapes. Thus, Telechron clocks are often considered genuine pieces of art—but art affordable by all, as thousands of them were made. The company employed some of the finest designers of the time, such as Leo Ivan Bruce (1911–1973) and John P. Rainbault. In the evolution of their designs, Telechron clocks were a faithful mirror of their own time. Just as a clock like the "Administrator" (designed by Leo Ivan Bruce) reflected thirties aesthetics, so the "Dimension" had 1950s lines. Telechrons were relatively expensive compared to other clocks. In 1941, their most inexpensive alarm clock was the model 7H117 "Reporter," and it sold for $2.95, the equivalent of $30.00 in 2008 funds. But their beautiful design and amazing reliability assured a brisk market for them throughout the company's most prosperous years.

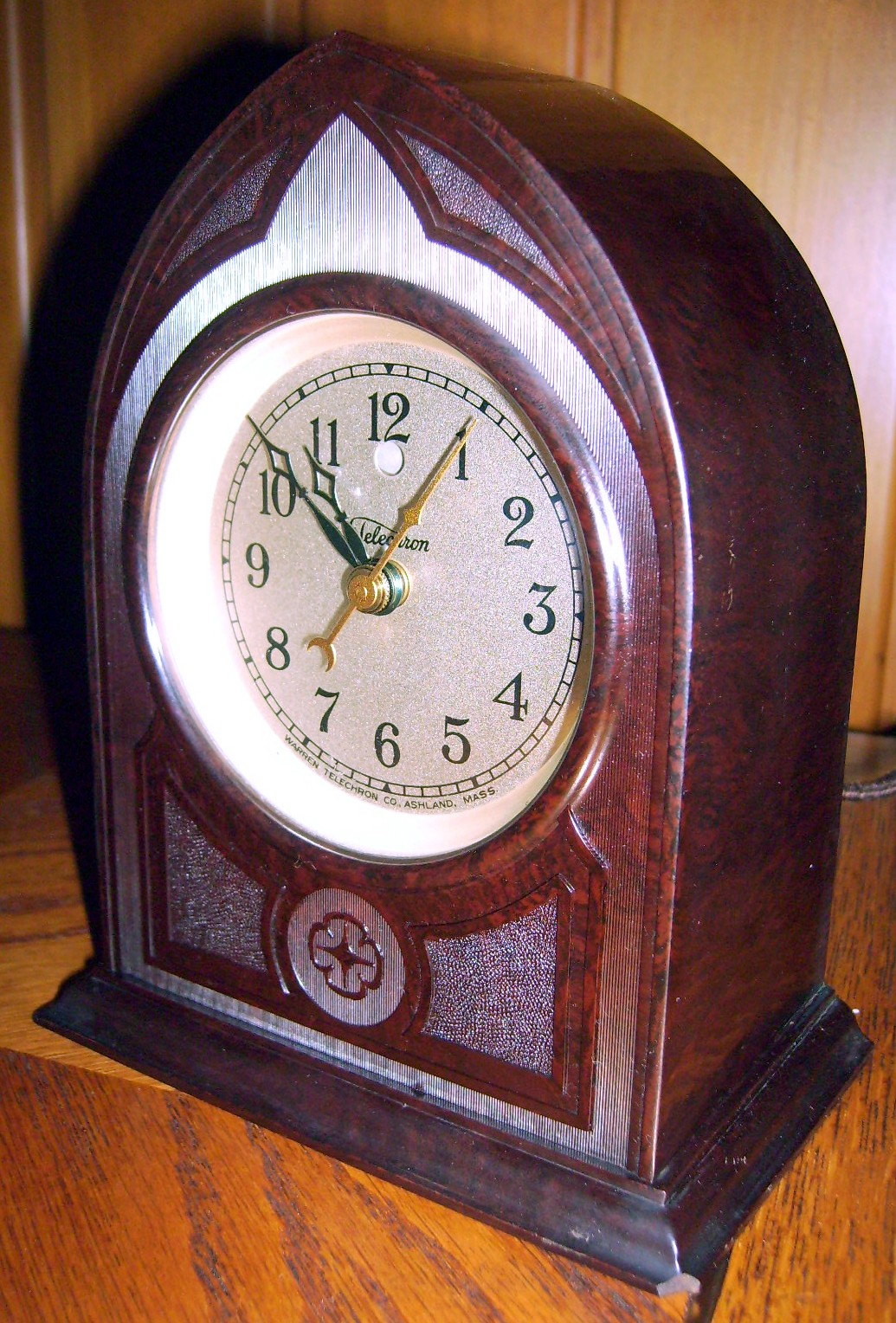
Telechron 355 "Cathedral" (1927–32)

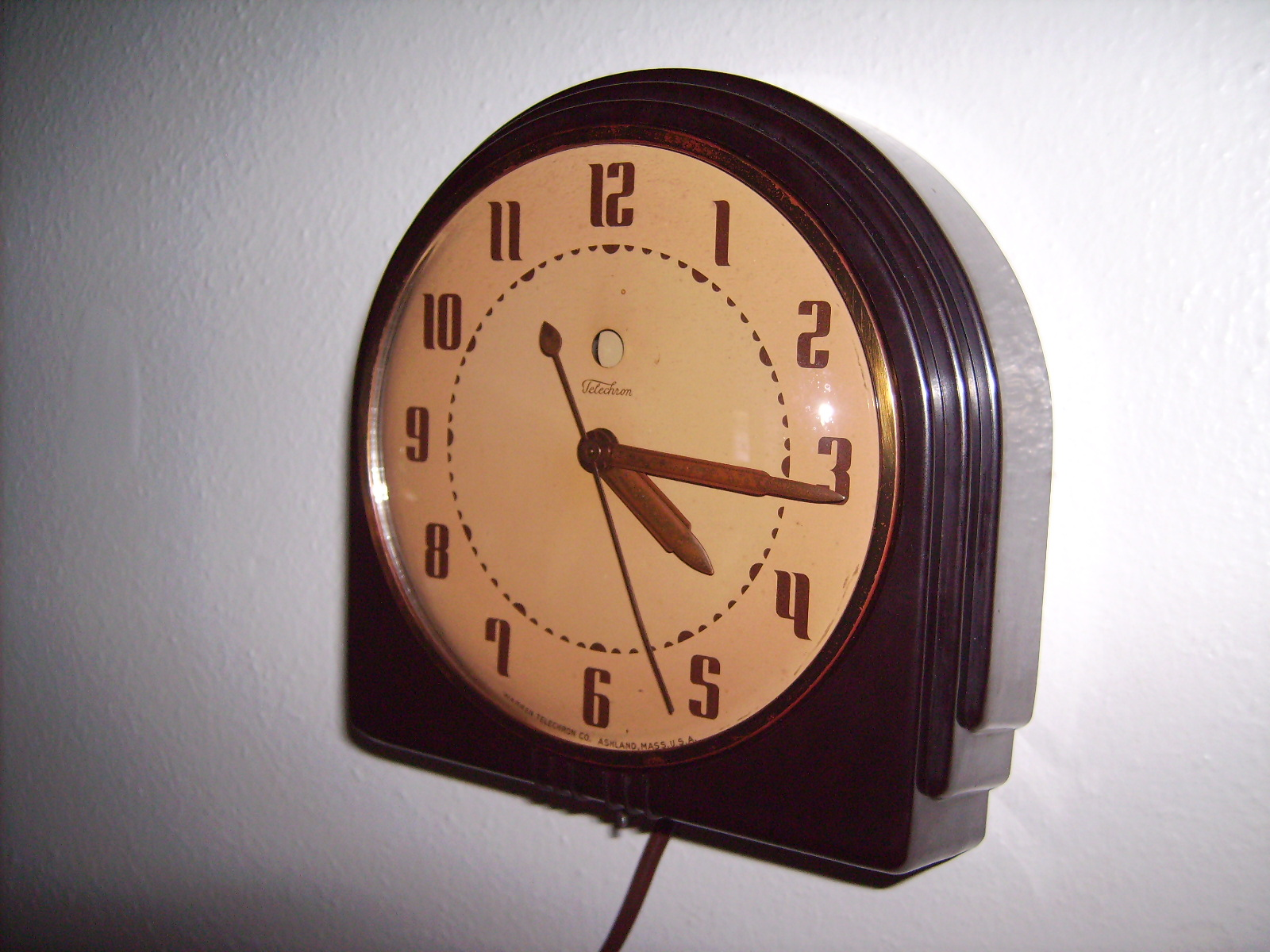
Telechron 2H07-Br "Administrator" (1937–40)

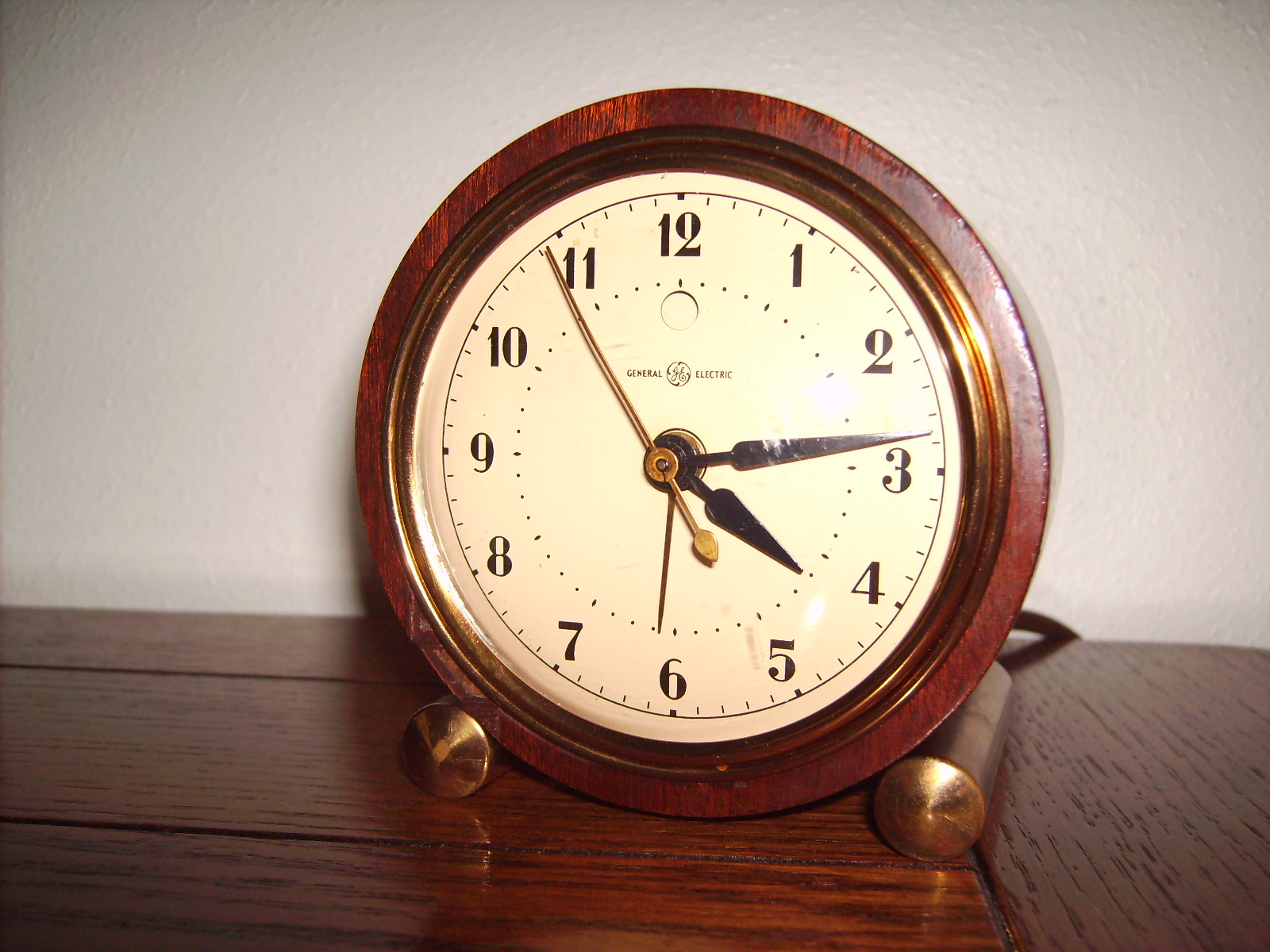
Telechron 7F72 "Heralder" (1930s)

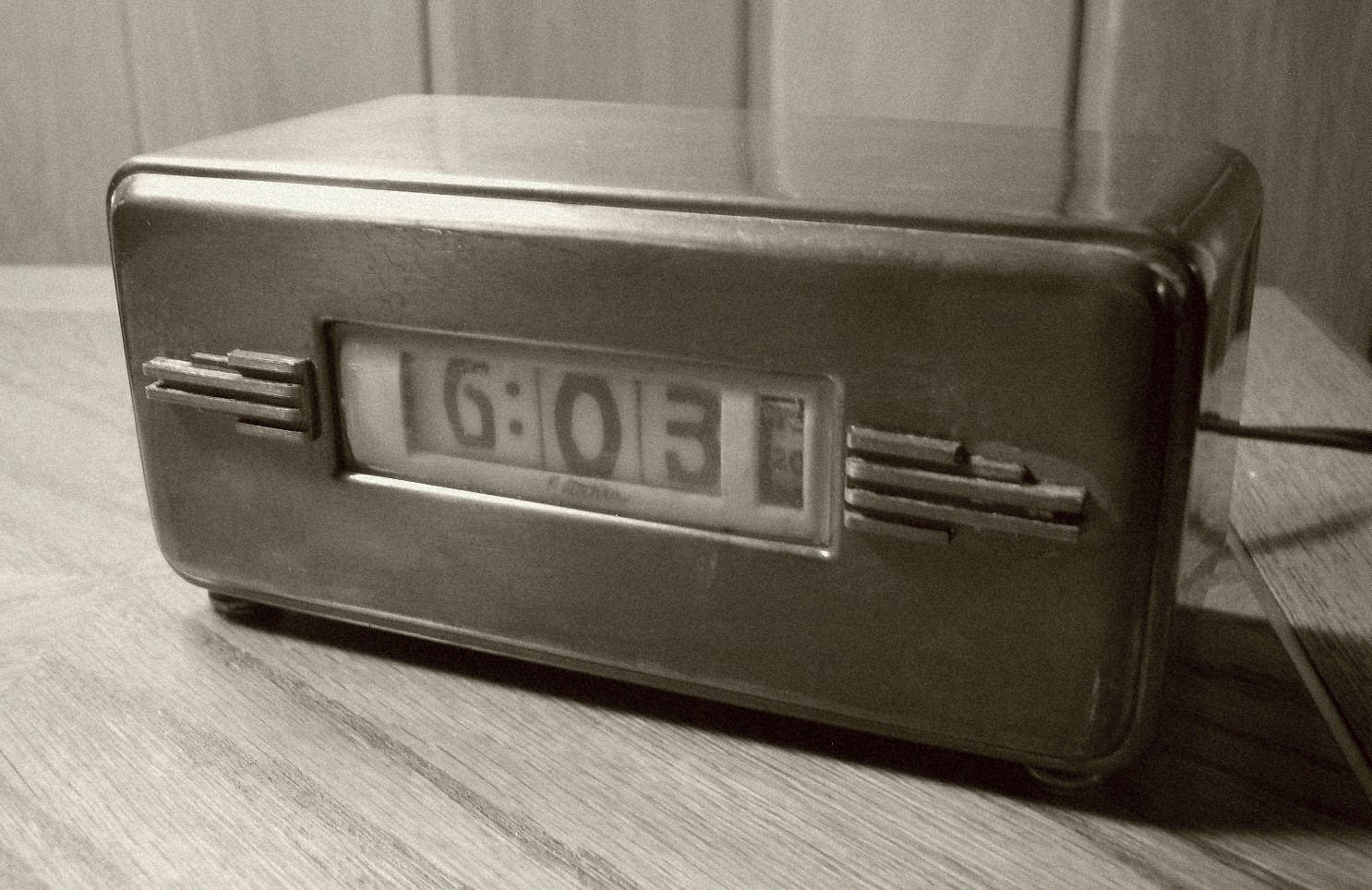
Telechron 8B23 "Register" (1946–48)

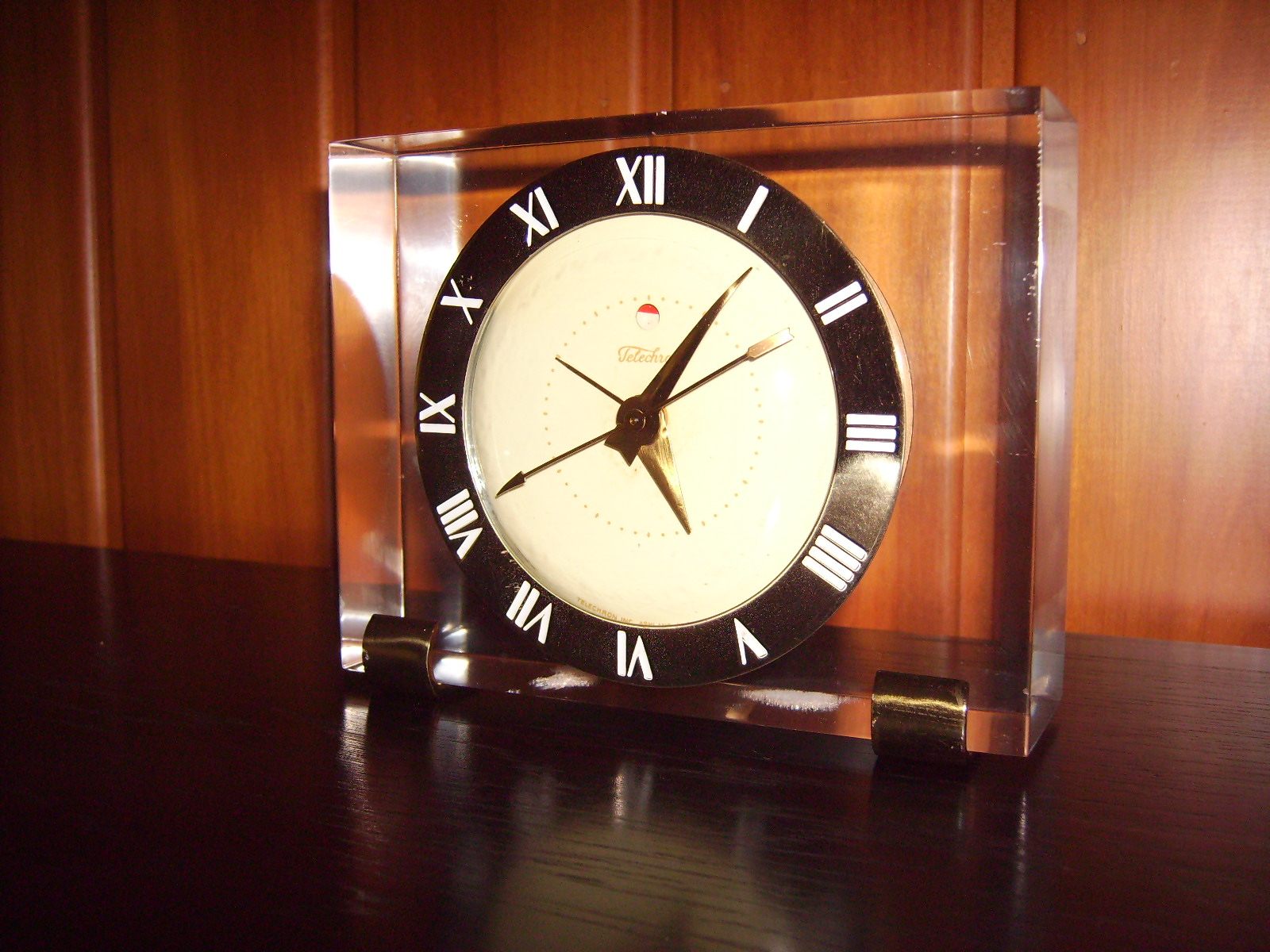
Telechron 7H141 "Airlux" (1946–57)

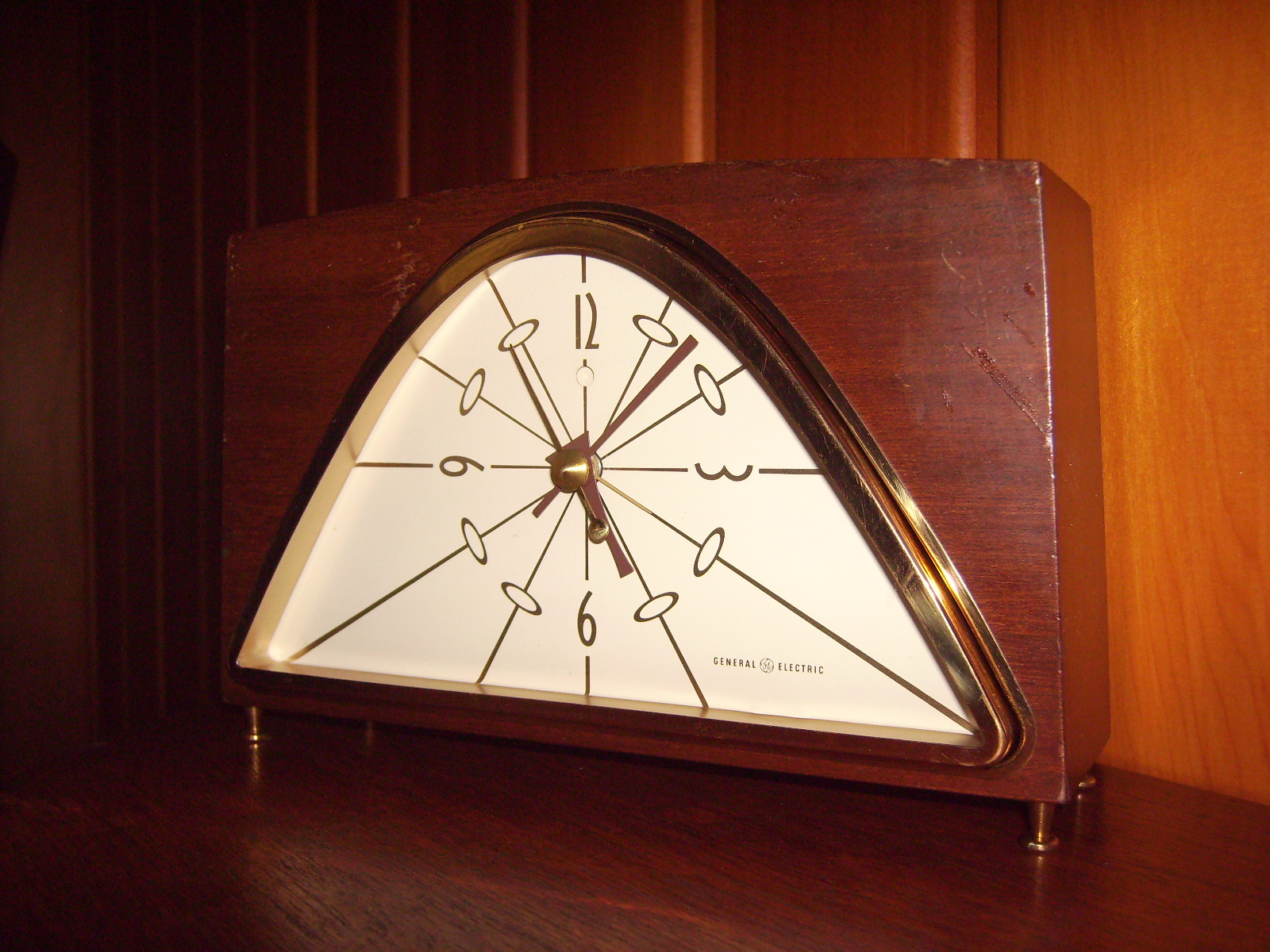
Telechron 7H257 "Dimension" (1954–59)

== History ==
As noted above, Henry Warren initially named his company "The Warren Clock Company." It became "Warren Telechron" in 1926. As early as 1917, General Electric acquired a strong interest in Telechron, realizing the economic potential of Warren's invention. When Warren retired in 1943, General Electric gradually absorbed Telechron into its operations. The clocks labeled "Telechron" on the dial, as well as those labeled "General Electric" (or both "General Electric" and "Telechron" on the dials) were both made in the Ashland, Massachusetts, factory. GE clocks had their own case, dial and hand designs, as well as model names and numbers, but the internal workings of both brands of clock were always the same Telechron type of movement.

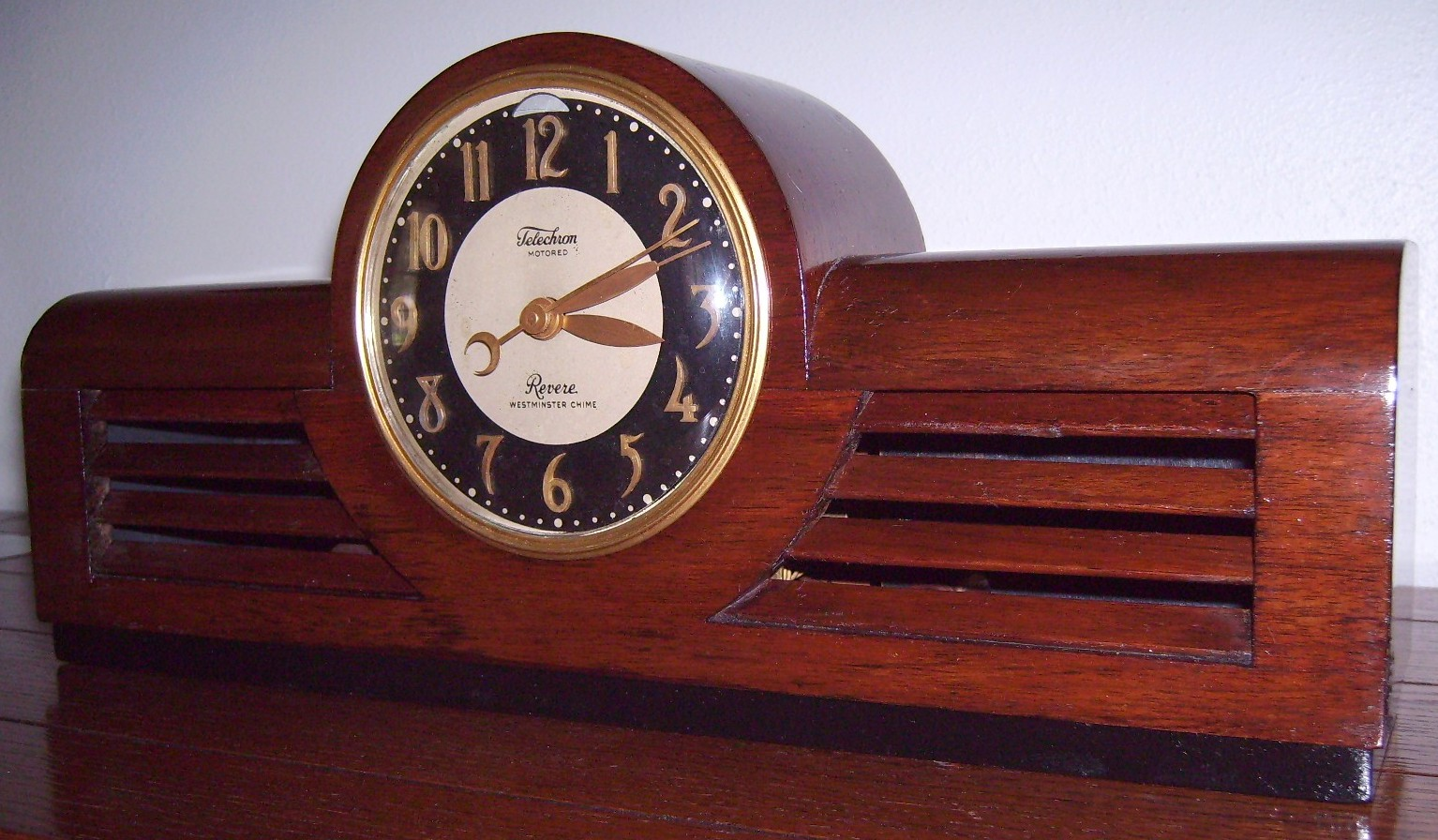
A Revere Clock with Westminster Chime (1940)

In addition to its association with GE, Telechron cooperated closely with one of America's most famous makers of traditional clocks, the Herschede company. Walter Herschede became interested in synchronous clocks in the 1920s, but did not want to risk the good name of his company by associating it too quickly with the new technology. Thus, he founded the Revere Clock Company as a division of Herschede that would market clocks driven by Telechron motors. These motors, however, were housed in the elegant cases of mantel and grandfather clocks for which Herschede was known; moreover, these clocks were equipped with chimes.

Telechron—now the "Clock and Timer Division" of GE—declined in the 1950s, mainly because batteries had become much more long-lived and reliable. Battery-powered clocks have the obvious advantage of not depending on the proximity of a power outlet, and do not require the often somewhat unattractive electric cable. Furthermore, the accuracy of the quartz clock superseded the principles of the synchronous motor. GE tried to respond to the declining market for Warren's technology by producing cheaper, less solidly manufactured clocks. Thus, plastic replaced bakelite or wood as the material for the cases; glass crystals were phased out in favor of plastic ones; and the much less durable S rotor took the place of the H rotor. Nevertheless, the decline of the synchronous clock could not be stopped. GE sold the last of its former Telechron plants, in Ashland, to Timex Group USA in 1979. After successive attempts to revive the business remained fruitless, it closed permanently in 1992. The Ashland plant was closed in 1993, and a memorial to Henry E. Warren was dedicated in the center of the town, adorned with a reproduction of a Telechron.

Nonetheless, even if Telechron's original operations have ceased, Telechron continues to exist as a brand: "Telechron" is the name used by a manufacturer of electric timers in Leland, North Carolina. Moreover, a company that spun off from one of Telechron's research labs in 1928 is still flourishing: Electric Time Company manufactures custom tower and post clocks in Medfield, Massachusetts. Electric Time is the only such company in the U.S. that still makes its own clock movements.

== Limitations of Telechron technology ==
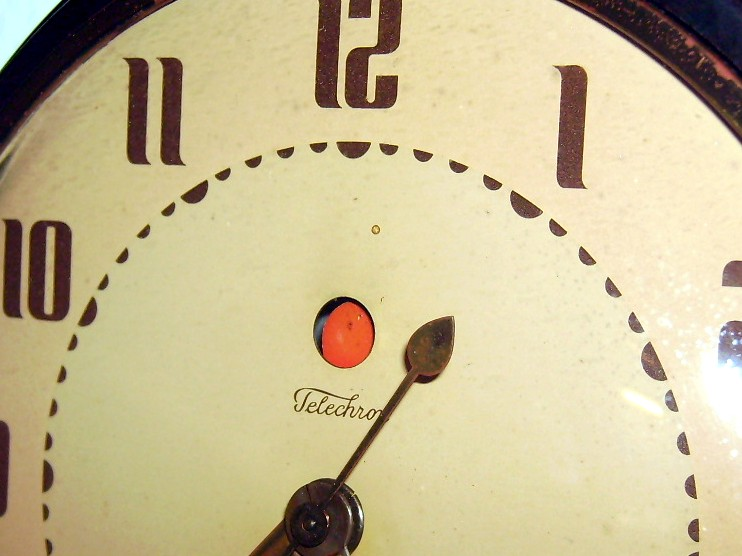
Indicating Device on Telechron 2H07-Br

From a commercial point of view, it was the increased durability of batteries as well as the invention of the quartz movement that proved fatal to Telechron. From the point of view of the history of technology, however, another problem is more crucial: if the electric power grid is used as a system for the "distribution of time," as Warren himself wrote, then, in the case of a power failure, the clocks stop, and the individual consumers' Telechrons lose their connection with the master clock (and, by implication, with the time provided by the Naval Observatory). If there is a temporary power outage while the owner is out, the running clock will display the incorrect time when he returns. Warren, foreseeing this difficulty, provided his clocks with an "indicating device": a red dot that would appear on the dial whenever the power failed. This red dot alerted the consumer to the need to reset the clock (by obtaining the accurate time through the telephone, for example, or from a radio). Setting the clock would reset the indicator. The electric clock market grew rapidly in the 1930s, and Telechron's patented power interruption indicator gave his clocks an advantage over competing synchronous clocks, but by the 1950s battery-operated clocks that weren't dependent on the power grid took market share, and in the 1960s the quartz clock replaced synchronous clocks.

The problem of how to keep clocks synchronized with primary standards was solved with the radio clock, which receives time signals not through the electric grid, but from government time radio stations.

== Collecting Telechron clocks ==
There is a growing community of hobbyists who collect Telechron clocks. An antique Telechron clock will usually come to life immediately (though sometimes noisily) when it is plugged in. Telechron motors are easily quieted and revived by carefully drilling 2 small holes that just puncture the surface, one on the large section, and one on the small section. A very light oil is injected, and then the small holes are carefully soldered shut. If a heavy oil is used, the clock may fail to keep accurate time until the motor becomes warm.

== Telechron alarm clocks ==
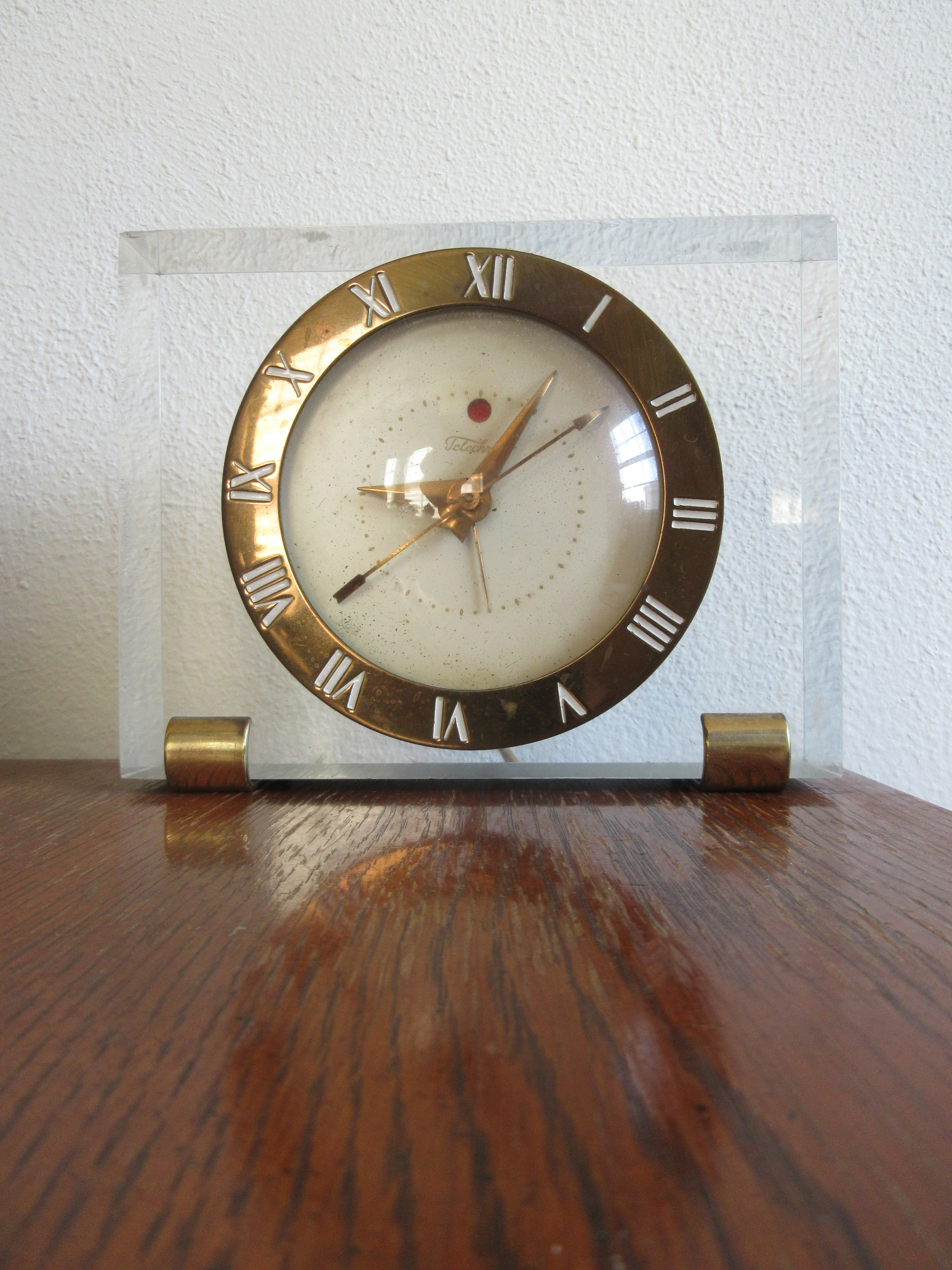
Telechron electric alarm clock

Telechron alarm clocks are particularly popular with collectors. Until about 1940, the overwhelming majority of Telechron alarm clocks had bell alarms. The entire mechanism was enclosed in a bell housing of steel. Atop the clock's coil was a metal strip that vibrated at 60 cycles per second when the alarm was tripped. This strip had a V-shaped arm attached to it, ending in a striker, which vibrated in turn against the bell housing. With the approach of war, restrictions on various metals required a reduction in their use, and the bell housing was eliminated, with only the metal strip above the coil remaining. This in itself, however, provided a loud buzz when the alarm was tripped (and was the basis of the alarm in all brands of alarm clocks for many years after the war). Post-war, very few Telechrons had bell alarms, and the bell had disappeared completely by 1960. Telechron was one of the first companies to introduce what became known as the "snooze" alarm in the early 1950s.
