= Electric Time Company =

American clock manufacturer

Electric Time Company, Inc.
- Type: Private
- Industry: Clock manufacturing
- Founded: 1928 (98 years ago), in Boston, Massachusetts, US
- Headquarters: Medfield, Massachusetts, United States
- Area served: Worldwide
- Key people: Thomas Erb (owner and president)
- Products: tower clocks, post clocks, and bracket clocks.
- Website: www.electrictime.com

Electric Time Company, founded in 1928, is a manufacturer of tower and street clocks marketed worldwide.

Thomas Erb has been the owner and president of Electric Time since 1984.

== History ==
Electric Time Company was founded in 1928 and incorporated in the state of Massachusetts on August 31, 1933. It was founded by a salesman for the Self Winding Clock Company and Telechron of Ashland, Massachusetts. Originally part of Telechron it progressed from an office in Boston, Massachusetts to manufacturing facilities in Wellesley, Massachusetts; South Natick, Massachusetts; and, currently, a 50,000 square foot (4,600 m^{2}) manufacturing facility in Medfield, Massachusetts.

An Electric Time 2-Dial Courtyard Post Clock in Leamington, Ontario.

Electric Time produces approximately 1000 clocks annually and is the largest maker of custom outdoor clocks in the United States. Electric Time produces tower clocks, post clocks, and bracket clocks. Electric Time has many clock installations throughout the world, ranging from Brazil to Turkey to Europe. Some notable installations are Wrigley Field, Tiffany & Co, Disneyworld, Disneyland and the Great American Ball Park.

In 1997, Electric Time was responsible for manufacturing the 27 clock installation at the Tourneau 57th street flagship location in New York City, which was later removed in 2020 during a renovation of the store.

== Media ==
Electric Time has been featured on the documentary series How It's Made and the local Boston television news magazine Chronicle. Electric Time was the basis for an article in The Wall Street Journal on Street Clocks.
