= Rialto Theater (Loveland, Colorado) =

- U.S. National Register of Historic Places
- U.S. Historic district – Contributing property
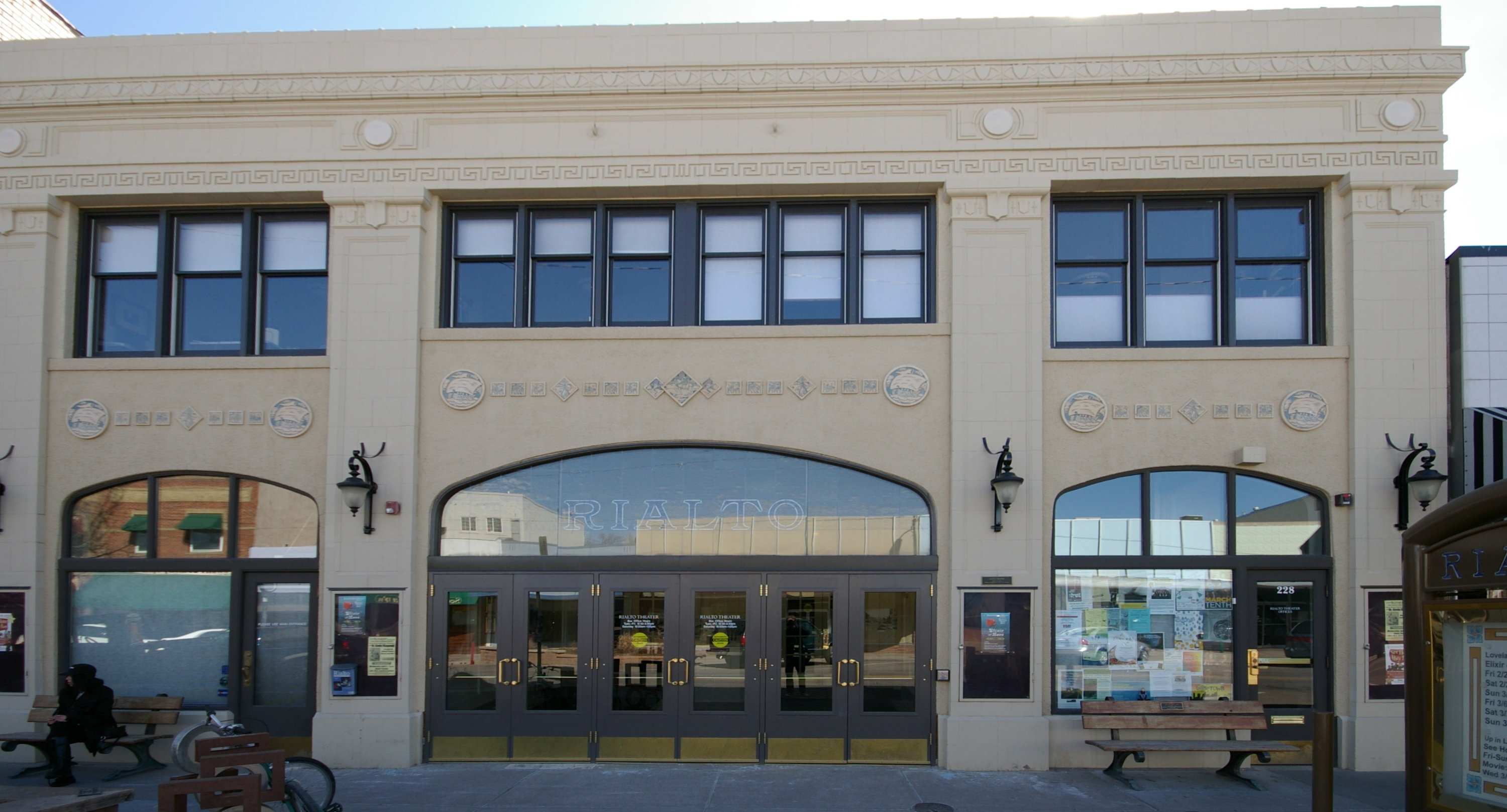
- Theater in 2009

- Location within Colorado
- Location: 228-230 E. Fourth Ave., Loveland, Colorado
- Coordinates: 40°23′43″N 105°04′24″W
- Area: 0.2 acres (0.081 ha)
- Built: 1919
- Architect: A. Danielson
- Architectural style: Classical Revival
- Part of: Downtown Loveland Historic District (ID15000281)
- NRHP reference No.: 87002213

Significant dates
- Added to NRHP: February 17, 1988
- Designated CP: June 1, 2015

The Rialto Theater in Loveland, Colorado, at 228-230 E. Fourth Ave., was built in 1919. It was listed on the National Register of Historic Places in 1988.

It has a three-bay Classical Revival front covered with glazed terra cotta blocks, of a 50 by 140 feet (15 m × 43 m) footprint. The two-story commercial block building has a flat roof and brick party and rear walls.

It was deemed significant as "one of the city's most architecturally refined buildings": although "it is not an especially exuberant or palatial example of early 20th century movie theater architecture, the Rialto is well proportioned and well articulated. It well represents Loveland building trends as well as national motion picture theater trends for the period. The Rialto is one of the last main street theatres in northern Colorado with any remaining architectural integrity. The marquee replacement and the most recent alterations have compromised the Rialto visually, but the building still retains a high degree of integrity of location, setting and association...."

Modifications to the theater have tended to contribute to, rather than detract from, its architectural character.

It is also a contributing building in the Downtown Loveland Historic District, which was added to the National Register in 2015.
