= Brown Street Clock Company =

Streek clock manufacturer

- Company type: Private (family-owned)
- Industry: Clock manufacturing
- Headquarters: Monessen, Pennsylvania, United States
- Key people: H. R. Brown
- Products: Street clocks

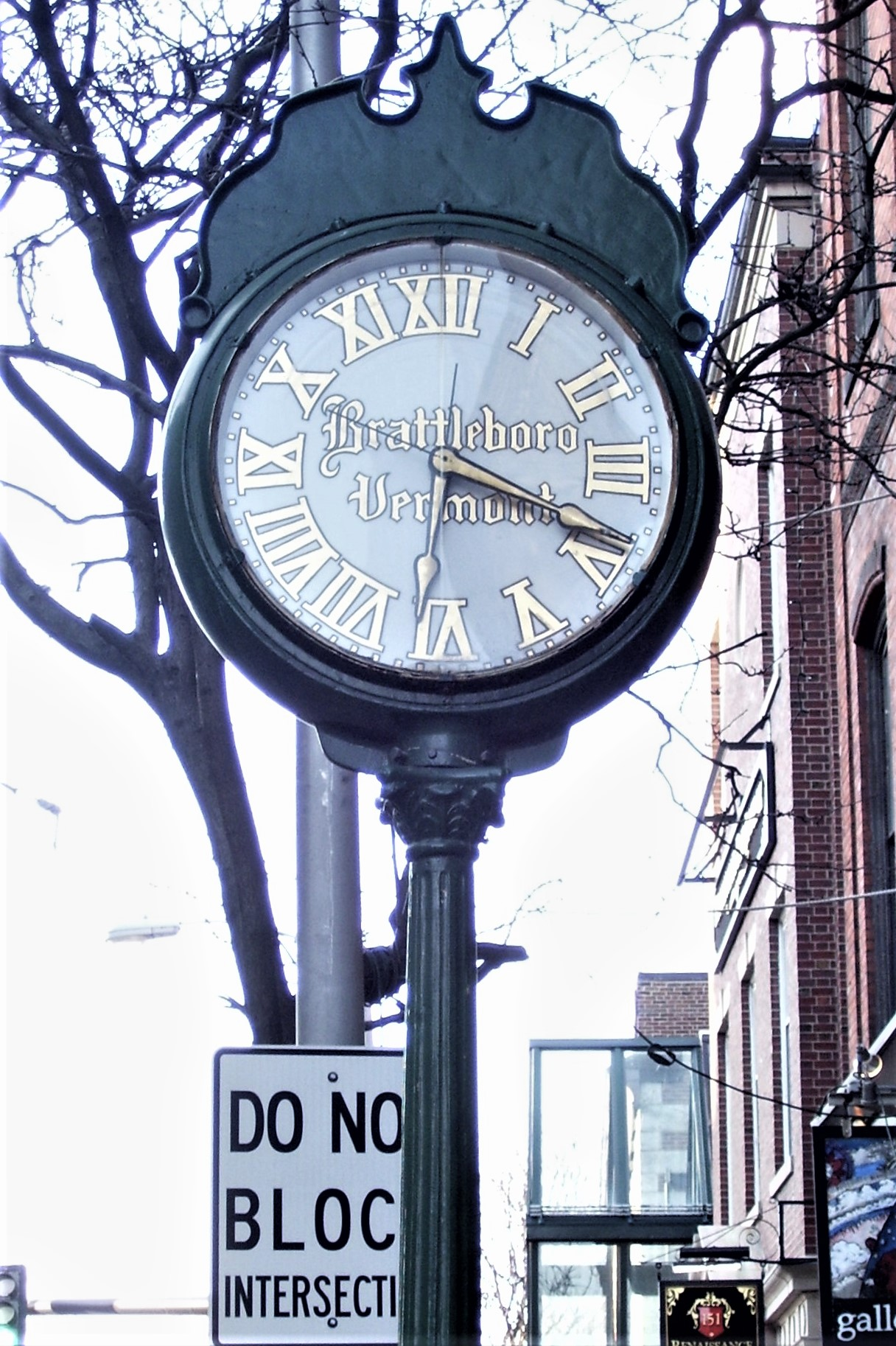
The Brattleboro town clock on Main Street was manufactured in 1908 by Brown Street Clock.

The Brown Street Clock Company of Monessen, Pennsylvania manufactured street clocks in the early twentieth century. It was a family owned company run by H.R. Brown and his three sons and all parts of the clock were made in the Monessen Valley. Many of these clocks were sold to and used by jewelers as signs for their businesses as they were marketed in Swartchild & Company, a major industry publication. Their cast iron clocks were considered to be more affordable and resilient than those of other manufacturers.

== Documentation ==
Steve Schmidt's "Brown Street Clock Registry" attempts to document information about the clocks. Among the clocks he has documented is the Loveland Street Clock, in Loveland, Colorado, installed in 1910 in front of Brannan Brothers Jewelry Store (1886), 239 East 4th Street, now "Garment Gal's", at 40.39553°N 105.07357°W. Other clocks whose history have been documented, included Guido's in Champaign, Illinois Lane Jewelers in Columbus, Ohio, and one in front of the Orlando Sentinel's offices. In 2018, the clock in front of Lane Jewelers was sold to a private buyer.

A clock originally installed for the R.G. Gordon jewelry store in Las Vegas, New Mexico was subject to restoration and re installation. One originally made for Gates Mills, Ohio was donated to the Henry Ford Museum in 1979.

== See also ==
- Standard Electric Time Company
