= Mackintosh (brand) =

Japanese raincoat and jacket brand

- Company type: Subsidiary
- Industry: Textile industry
- Founded: Glasgow, 1824
- Key people: Charles Macintosh, Founder
- Products: Rubberised coats and accessories
- Owner: Yagi Tsusho
- Website: mackintosh.com

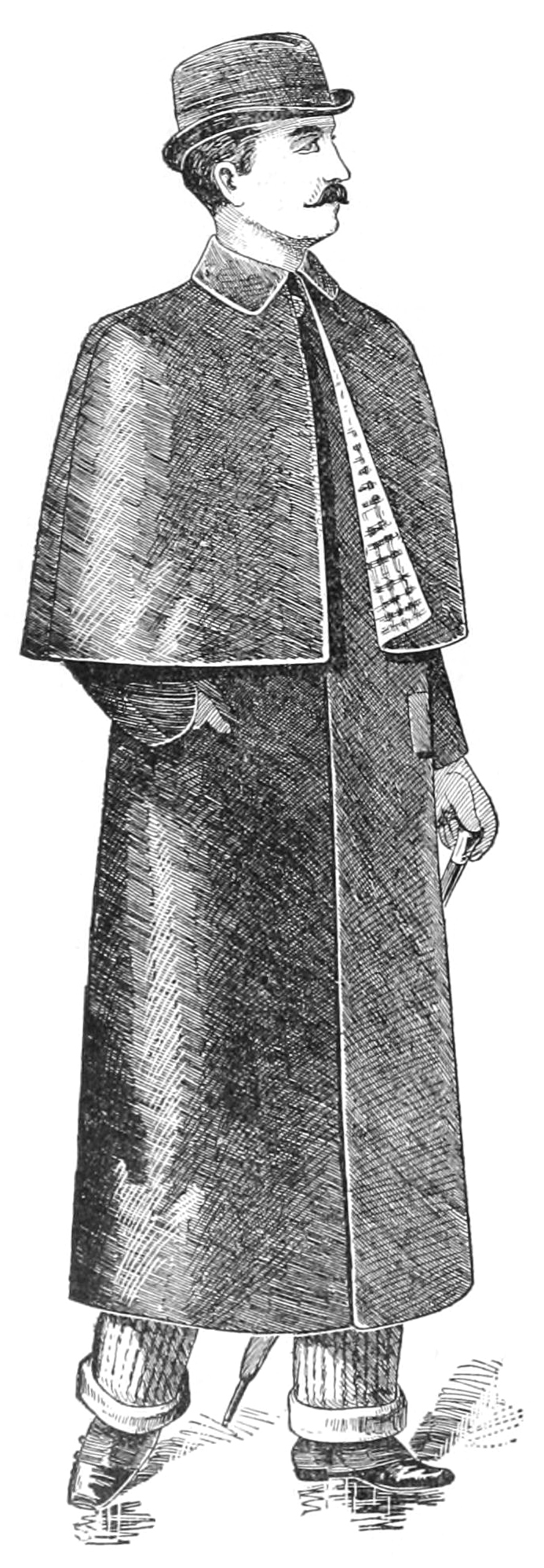

Mackintosh is a raincoat and jacket brand founded in 1824 in Scotland, and owned by Tokyo firm Yagi Tsusho (八木通商) since 2007. Yagi Tsusho also distributes Barbour in the Japanese market. It is named after its Scottish founder Charles Macintosh. The common name "mackintosh" is now the generalised term for a balmacaan-style raincoat.

== History ==
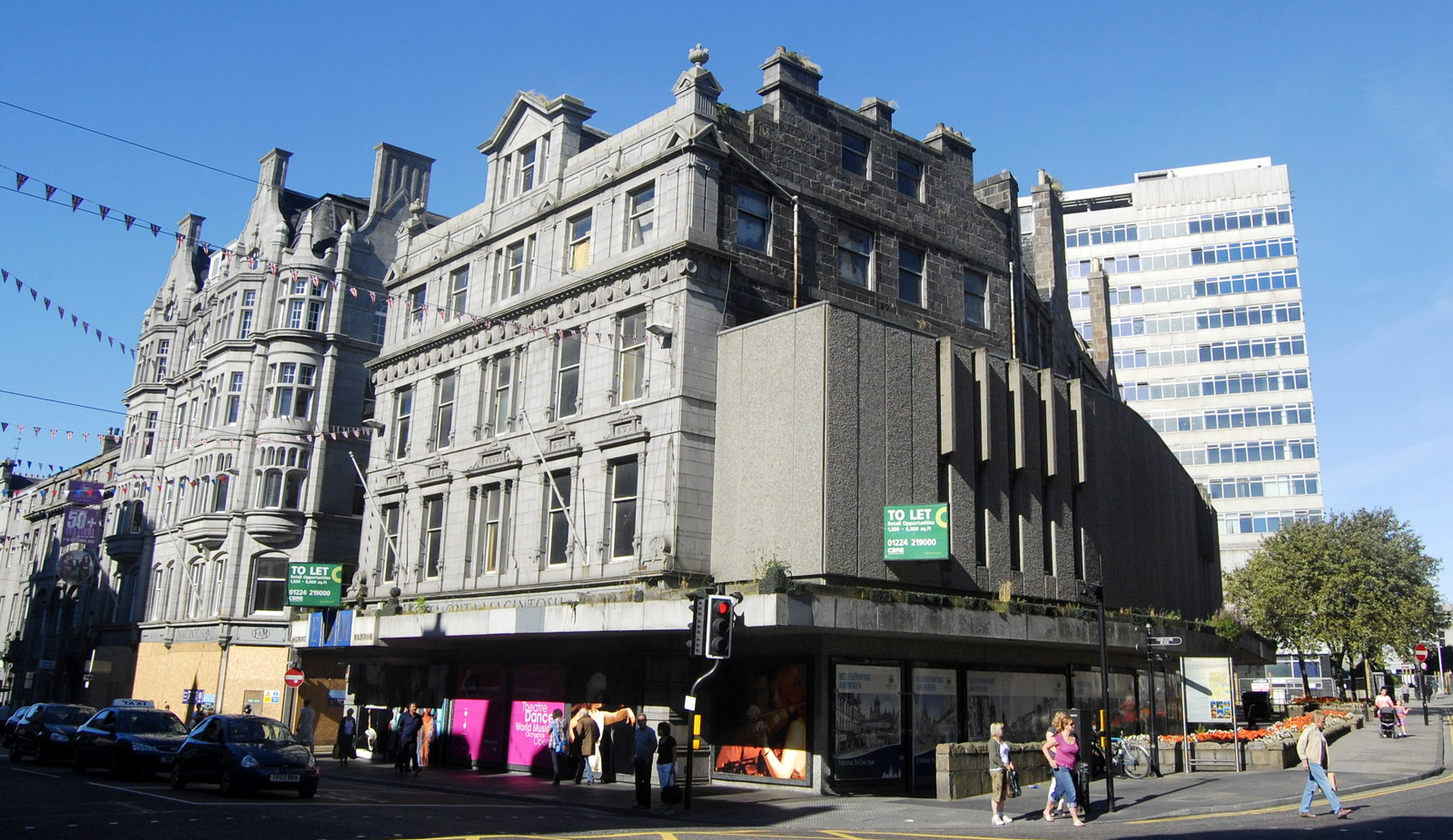

Charles Macintosh started his waterproof raincoat company in 1824. In 1830 Macintosh's company merged with the clothing company of Thomas Hancock in Manchester. Hancock had also been experimenting with rubber coated fabrics since 1819. Production of rubberised coats soon spread across the UK. All kinds of coats were produced with rubberized material, including riding coats and coats supplied to the British Army, British railways, and UK police forces.

Early coats had problems with poor smell, stiffness, and a tendency to melt in hot weather. Hancock improved his waterproof fabrics, patenting a method for vulcanising rubber in 1843, solving many of the problems.

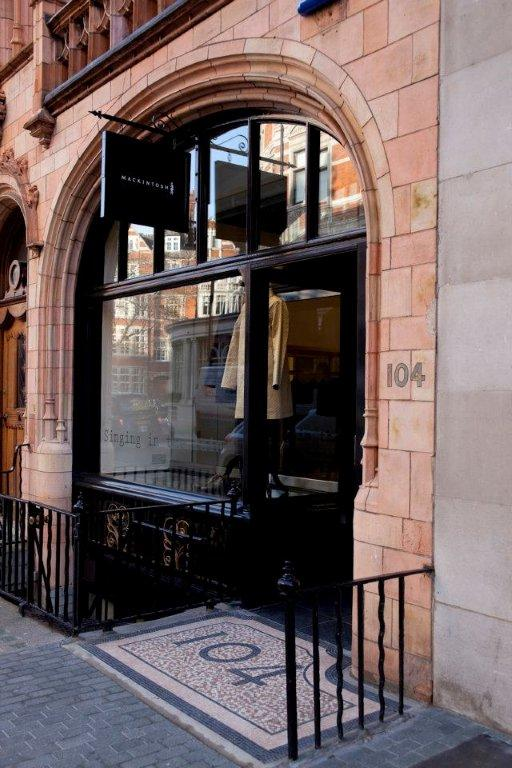
The Mackintosh Store at 104 Mount Street in Mayfair, London

Throughout the 19th and 20th centuries, the company continued to make waterproof clothing. In 1925 the company was taken over by Dunlop Rubber.

In the mid-1990s the Mackintosh brand owner, Traditional Weatherwear, was on the verge of closing its factory in Blairlinn, Cumbernauld near Glasgow. Around the turn of the 21st century, senior staff members acquired the company and established the traditional rubberised Mackintosh coat as an upmarket brand in its own right. The company collaborated with leading fashion houses such as Gucci, Hermès, Louis Vuitton, and Liberty. The coats became particularly popular with Japanese women, and the company won a Queen's Award for Enterprise in 2000 for its success in international trade. In December 2003 the company name was formally changed to Mackintosh.

In 2007, Mackintosh was bought by Tokyo firm Yagi Tsusho. With the backing of its parent company, Mackintosh has continued to expand. In January 2011, the company opened its first fashion store in London. In Japan the brand is distributed by Sanyo Shokai.

In 2016 the brand hired Bulgarian designer Kiko Kostadinov, a graduate of Central Saint Martins, to launch a new more fashion-forward line, Mackintosh 0001. Kiko Kostadinov delivered his first collection in Winter 2017, showing sweaters, jackets, suits, coats, made up in cashmeres and wools.

In 2017 the company opened a store on New York's Madison Avenue.
