= Riding coat =

Any coat for horseback riding

A riding coat or jacket is a garment initially designed as outerwear for horseback riding. It protects the wearer's upper clothes from dirt and wear, and may provide additional protection in case of falls. It is very helpful to the riders.

== History ==
=== East Asia ===
The Manchu "horse jacket" (magua) was a dark blue riding coat worn by Manchurian horsemen before becoming a staple item of menswear across the Qing Empire. It subsequently developed into the Burmese Taikpon and the Chinese Tangzhuang.

=== Britain ===
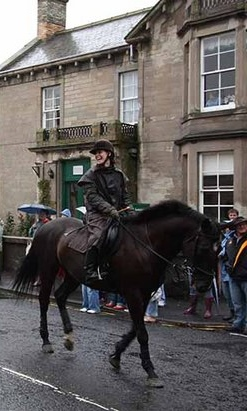
Woman wearing a traditional riding mac at a parade in Coldstream

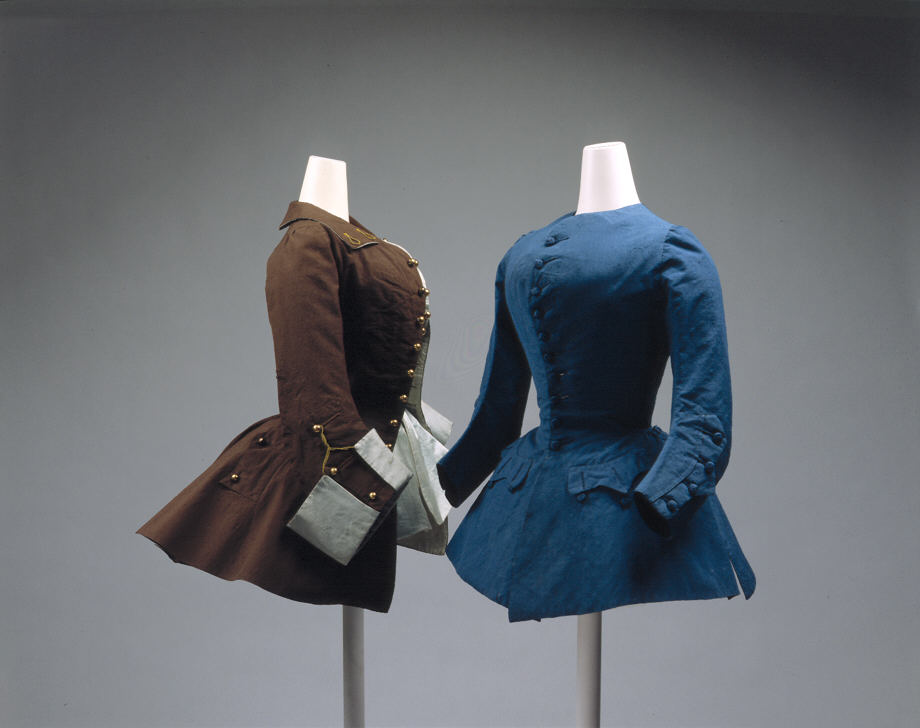
Riding coat, 18th century, Metropolitan Museum of Art

Original waterproof designs – similar to a Mackintosh – generally comprised a full-length coat with a wide skirt and leg straps to keep it in place. Other typical features included a belted waist, large patch pockets with protective flap, raglan sleeves with tab, and wind cuff, fly front, throat tab and a broad collar.

In 1823, Charles Macintosh (1766–1843) patented his invention for waterproof rubberized cloth, pressing together two sheets of cotton material with dissolved Indian rubber placed in between. It was a brilliant idea for making any fabric waterproof, and the first Macintosh coats were made at the family's dyestuffs factory, Charles Macintosh and Co. of Glasgow.

The rubber processing pioneer Thomas Hancock (1786–1865) was aware of Macintosh’s work, and in 1825 he took out a license to manufacture the patented "waterproof double textures".

Hancock's solutions for using masticated scrap rubber instead had a higher rubber content than Macintosh's. It gave a uniform film to the cloth while minimizing water penetration and odor.

In 1831, John Hancock joined Charles Macintosh & Co. as a partner, leading to the merging of the two companies. This collaboration brought about the development of an automated spreading machine, which replaced the use of paint brushes in Macintosh's original designs. A significant setback for Hancock occurred in 1834 when his London factory was destroyed in a fire. It forced Macintosh to close his Glasgow factory, relocating all operations to Manchester.

From then on, the manufacturing of "proper" raincoats or macs impervious to all weathers – constructed of two layers of rubber-coated cotton fabric or "double textured" – was concentrated, with all necessary expertise and experience, in Manchester or the Lancastrian cotton towns. Such rubber or rubberized products amounted to a "cottage industry", as confirmed by the abundance of company records in the National Archives at Kew, Surrey.

Classic, belted, double-textured trench coats in off-white or fawn for riding or walking were fashionable before World War 2. They lasted until the end of the century as a specifically British fashion, flattering the human form and enhancing its magnetism.

Typical wartime usage can be seen in Danger UXB (Anthony Andrews), first broadcast in the late 1970s, or the 1976 movie The Eagle Has Landed (film) by Donald Sutherland. The military flavor of rubberized raincoats continued with the 1997 tv program Bodyguards (as sported by John Shrapnel playing Commander MacIntyre of the elite protection team). A model pictured in the December 1944 issue of Vogue (magazine) showed the attractiveness and practicality of these garments for the fashion-conscious, while they appeared in favorite 1950s and 1960s feature films such as Genevieve (1953) (worn by Dinah Sheridan), Me and the Colonel (1958) (Nicole Maurey) and Twice Round the Daffodils (1962) (Sheila Hancock), always sharp, clean, rustling and making a bold statement.

Meanwhile, traditional gentlemen's outfitters, such as Cordings, Hackett, and Gieves & Hawkes, continued to sell plenty of the popular walking coats in thick rubberized cotton. Around 1960, zippered jackets with a cinched waist were ordinary for young and old in Britain. Dark green hooded anoraks were fashioned with the same materials. The anoraks were typically made in dark green for scouting, hiking, climbing, canoeing, and other outdoor activities.

In 1970, double-textured "gangster" macs were the must-have, trendy outerwear for girls, originating from the Valstar "Gangster" brand designed by Maurice Attwood. The styles featuring a signature yoke in front and back, a belt and peplum, and wrist straps with buckles were sold in a range of colors, lengths, and either cotton or viscose at major high street stores like Debenhams (under their Debroyal brand) and C&A (Vivienne style) at prices from £10 to £20. The yoked design was all the rage, even appearing in small sizes for children.

This style, together with a similar style of rainwear, graced the foremost actors and actresses of the time. Cinema films included Country Dance (1970) (Susannah York), Hoffman (1970) (Sinéad Cusack), No Blade of Grass (1970) (Nigel Davenport, Jean Wallace, Lynne Frederick), The Ragman's Daughter (1972) (Victoria Tennant) and All Creatures Great and Small (film) (1974) (Lisa Harrow, Simon Ward). Examples of the many TV series in that period containing Valstar “Gangster” type double-textured rainwear were Take Three Girls (Liza Goddard), The Lotus Eaters (Wanda Ventham), and Man About the House (Paula Wilcox).

Since they provided effective insulation against the cold, the garments were later called “winter macs” by females, who would wear them buttoned, with short upturned collars and - to complete the look - a neckerchief giving a bright, contrasting slash of color.

The retro "gangster" style has been revived as the "Chorlton" in a choice of five colors by Lakeland Elements of Lancaster since Chorlton-upon-Medlock, now part of Greater Manchester, was the location of one of the early Macintosh factories.

Over the years, other design initiatives and variants included the introduction of colorful, light double-textured, and single-textured rubberized macs. There were ponchos, military-style capes, and, more recently the short, navy blue Margaret Howell hoody. On the Continent of Europe, the green hooded anorak or slicker, with yellow rubber lining, retained its popularity. This can be seen in the classic French relationship movie The Aviator's Wife (1981). The similarly unisex Friesennerz reversible hooded anorak in yellow rubber with blue or sometimes fawn lining, was sold on Germany’s high streets and sported by Glenda Jackson in her 1978 film The Class of Miss MacMichael. Certainly, the latter mac was beloved by young tourists of German nationality making a pilgrimage to the fashion mecca of the Swinging Sixties, Carnaby Street in London WW1.
