= Mackintosh (raincoat) =

British name for a raincoat made of rubberised fabric

A mackintosh raincoat (abbreviated as mac) is a form of balmacaan-style raincoat made of waterproof fabric. It takes its name from the brand Mackintosh, which introduced the garment in 1824 using its signature rubberised cloth.

The Mackintosh is named after its Scottish inventor Charles Macintosh, although many writers added a letter k. The variant spelling of "Mackintosh" is now standard.

== History ==
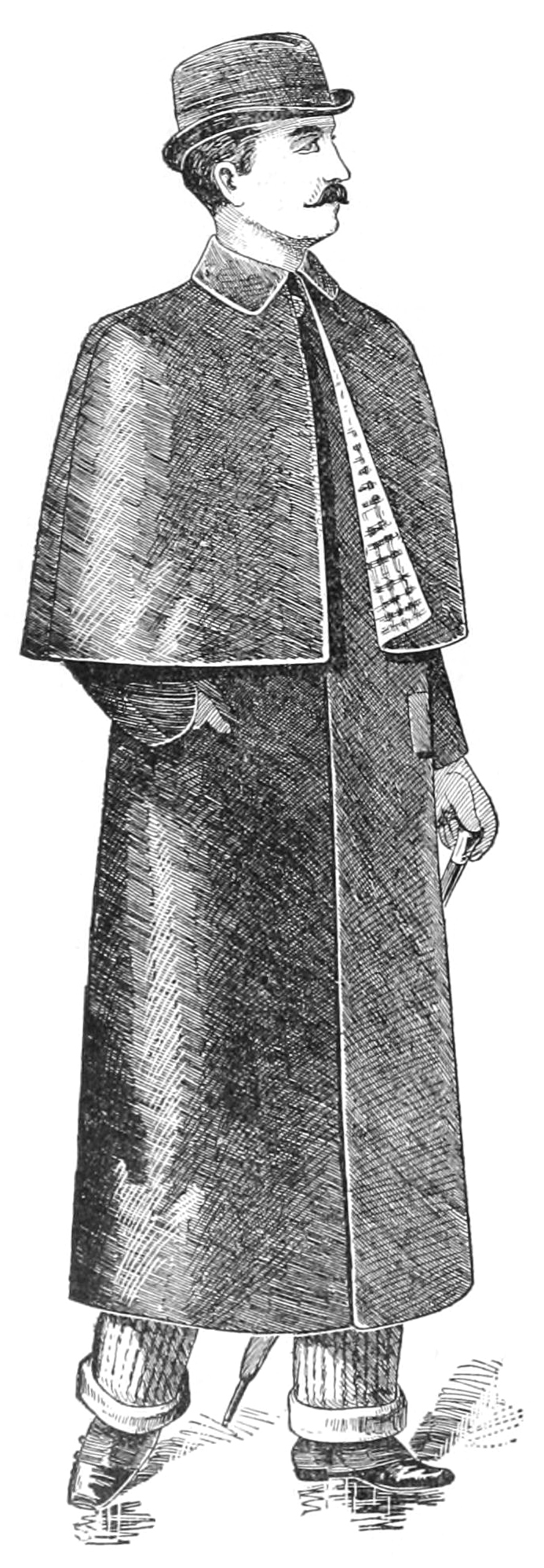
A gentleman's Macintosh, from an 1893 catalogue

It has been claimed that the material was invented by the surgeon James Syme, but then copied and patented by Charles Macintosh; Syme's method of creating a solvent from coal tar was published in Thomson's Annals of Philosophy in 1818; this paper also describes the dissolution of natural rubber in naphtha.

However, a detailed history of the invention of the Mackintosh was published by Schurer. The essence of Macintosh's process was the sandwiching of an impermeable layer of a solution of rubber in naphtha between two layers of fabric. The naphtha was distilled from coal tar, with the Bonnington Chemical Works being a major supplier. Syme did not propose the sandwich idea, and his paper did not mention waterproofing. Waterproofing garments with rubber was an old idea and was practised in pre-Columbian times by the Aztecs, who impregnated fabric with latex. Later French scientists made balloons gas-tight (and incidentally, impermeable) by impregnating fabric with rubber dissolved in turpentine, but this solvent was not satisfactory for making apparel.

In 1830 Macintosh's company merged with the clothing company of Thomas Hancock in Manchester. Hancock had also been experimenting with rubber coated fabrics since 1819. Production of rubberised coats soon spread across the UK. All kinds of coats were produced with rubberized material, including riding coats and coats supplied to the British Army, British railways, and UK police forces.

Early coats had problems with poor smell, stiffness, and a tendency to melt in hot weather. Hancock improved his waterproof fabrics, patenting a method for vulcanising rubber in 1843, solving many of the problems.

Throughout the 19th and 20th centuries, the company continued to make waterproof clothing. In 1925 the company was taken over by Dunlop Rubber.

== Revival ==
In the mid-1990s the Mackintosh brand owner, Traditional Weatherwear, was on the verge of closing its factory in Blairlinn, Cumbernauld near Glasgow. Around the turn of the 21st century, senior staff members acquired the company and established the traditional rubberised Mackintosh coat as an upmarket brand in its own right. The company collaborated with leading fashion houses such as Gucci, Hermès, Louis Vuitton, and Liberty. The coats became particularly popular with Japanese women, and the company won a Queen's Award for Enterprise in 2000 for its success in international trade. In December 2003 the company name was formally changed to Mackintosh.

In 2007, the brand was bought by Tokyo firm Yagi Tsusho. With the backing of its parent company, Mackintosh has continued to expand its reputation and marketing operations. In January 2011, the company opened its first fashion store in London. In Japan the brand is distributed by Sanyo Shokai.

== Bibliography ==
- Hancock, Thomas (1857). Personal Narrative of the Origin and Progress of the Caoutchouc or India-Rubber Manufacture in England. London: Longman, Brown, Green, Longmans & Roberts.
