= Razny =

Razny Jewelers is a Chicago-based fine jewelry and timepiece retailer. It is a family business in its third generation. The family first opened a store Oak Park, Illinois in 1951 after immigrating from Poland in the aftermath of World War II. The company has retail stores in Chicago, Hinsdale, Addison, and Highland Park.

Razny Jewelers carries Patek Philippe, Rolex, Tudor, Cartier, and Breitling. Razny Jewelers carries Kwiat and Rahaminov diamonds along with three in-house brands, and does not retail any lab-grown diamonds.

In 2024 the company bought the next-door townhouse on Oak Street that had been leased by Paul Stuart.
