= Stover at Yale =

1912 novel

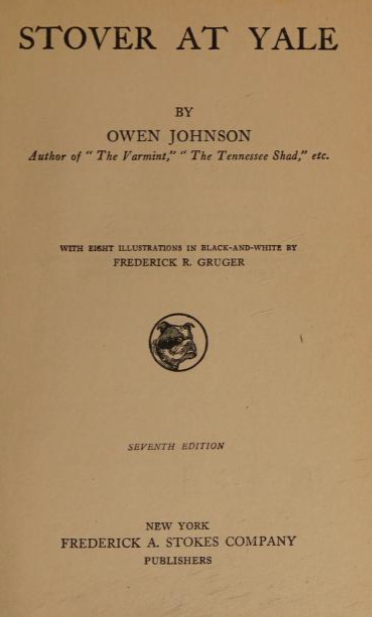
- Title page for Stover at Yale (1912)
- Author: Owen Johnson
- Language: English
- Publisher: Frederick A. Stokes
- Publication date: 1912
- Publication place: United States
- Media type: Print (hardcover)

Stover at Yale, by Owen Johnson is a novel describing undergraduate life at Yale at the turn of the 20th century. The book was described by F. Scott Fitzgerald as the "textbook" of his generation. Stover at Yale recounts Dink Stover's navigation through the social structure at Yale and his struggles with social pressure.

== Plot summary ==
=== Setting the Stage (Chapters 1-3) ===
The story opens with a picture of Stover seating himself on a train bound for New Haven. A short account is given of Stover's background from his Lawrenceville School days (recounted in The Varmint). He overcame a poor start at the prep school and gained a reputation in football and as a class leader. While Stover is poised in dress and bearing, his classmates appear more eager and juvenile. Stover listens to them talk and learns of the secret society system, which will be the main drama of the plot. Later, the tap ceremony for the Yale senior society Skull and Bones is vividly described.

While on the train, Stover also meets Tom Regan, an older, physically imposing and more open classmate of his, as well as LeBaron, a leading sophomore who is already taking Stover under his wing.

Arriving at his campus lodgings, Stover meets several more characters who will play parts in the following chapters. With Tough McCarty, his rival become friend from Lawrenceville days, Stover has a joyous roughhouse. He also meets McNabb, who is the "partier" of the freshman class. With Hunter, who is reserved and poised for leadership, Stover instantly feels rivalry. A sophomore, Reynolds, "an undersized nervous fellow" but first in his class to "make the News", stops by to check on the Andover freshmen in the house. He evaluates each man and advises him on what to go after in terms of extracurriculars. Some comic relief is afforded when Rogers, a junior stops by, and the tone changes to Reynolds deferring while Rogers leads the group in antagonizing a group of sophomores by turning lights on and off.

The chapter concludes with Stover's dinner with LeBaron. LeBaron counsels Stover on the importance of winning election to a secret society. Stover is troubled by the status given to this social positioning. Back with Tough, Stover tells him to "go slow" about making new friendships, nixing Tough's plan for a dining group, but has difficulty explaining his thinking.

=== Establishing himself in the class (Chapters 4-27) ===
The action then shifts to the gridiron. Stover performs well at basic drills, but gets no praise and is not called on to scrimmage. Tompkins, one of the coaches, cautions him, "Stover, just one word for your good. You come up with a big prep school reputation. Don't make an ass of yourself."

Later, Stover meets Gimbal, who openly proclaims a plan to fight the society system. Gimbal is also open about looking for political leadership with his anti-society stance. The two shake hands, but Stover is uncertain what to make of Gimbal.

In the evening, Stover and his class take part in wrestling contests against the sophomores. When no one from his class will stand in as the middleweight, Stover volunteers, though he knows no wrestling. Stover uses his football tackling power to beat his opponent, despite the other man's better knowledge of wrestling. Dana, the football captain, and Tompkins, the coach, see Stover's incredible tackling power and recognize him for it, enthusiastically and sparingly. Stover is borne home by his classmates, having established himself as a name in the class.

Stover reconnects with Regan, who had avoided the wrestling match and the first week of practice, despite his huge size, preferring to concentrate on personal affairs and school. Stover also meets other members of the class: Bob Story, son of an influential judge, as well as Joe Hungerford, a "name known across the world for power in finance." Stover, with Hungerford's encouragement, persuades Regan to become the waiter for their dining club.

In football practice, Stover at first is disappointed that his wrestling heroics do not suddenly win him a place on the team, but eventually he gets placed as the end on the scrub team. He battles a senior, Bangs, who is the starting end, and outplays him dramatically. Bangs resents Stover's presence as threatening a position that he spent three years building toward.

== Publication history ==
Stover at Yale was originally serialized in McClure's in 1911. The copyright has expired and the work has passed into public domain.

== Commentary and reviews ==
There were varied reactions to the book.

== Influence ==
An image of Dink Stover sitting on the Yale fence is the logo of New York-based menswear brand Paul Stuart.
