= Thomas Hancock (inventor) =

British manufacturing engineer (1786–1865)

- Born: 8 May 1786; Marlborough, England
- Died: 26 March 1865 (aged 78); London
- Engineering career
- Projects: Mechanical processing of raw rubber

Thomas Hancock (8 May 1786 – 26 March 1865), elder brother of inventor Walter Hancock, was an English self-taught manufacturing engineer who founded the British rubber industry. He invented the masticator, a machine that shredded rubber scraps and which allowed rubber to be recycled after being formed into blocks or sheets.

== Early life ==
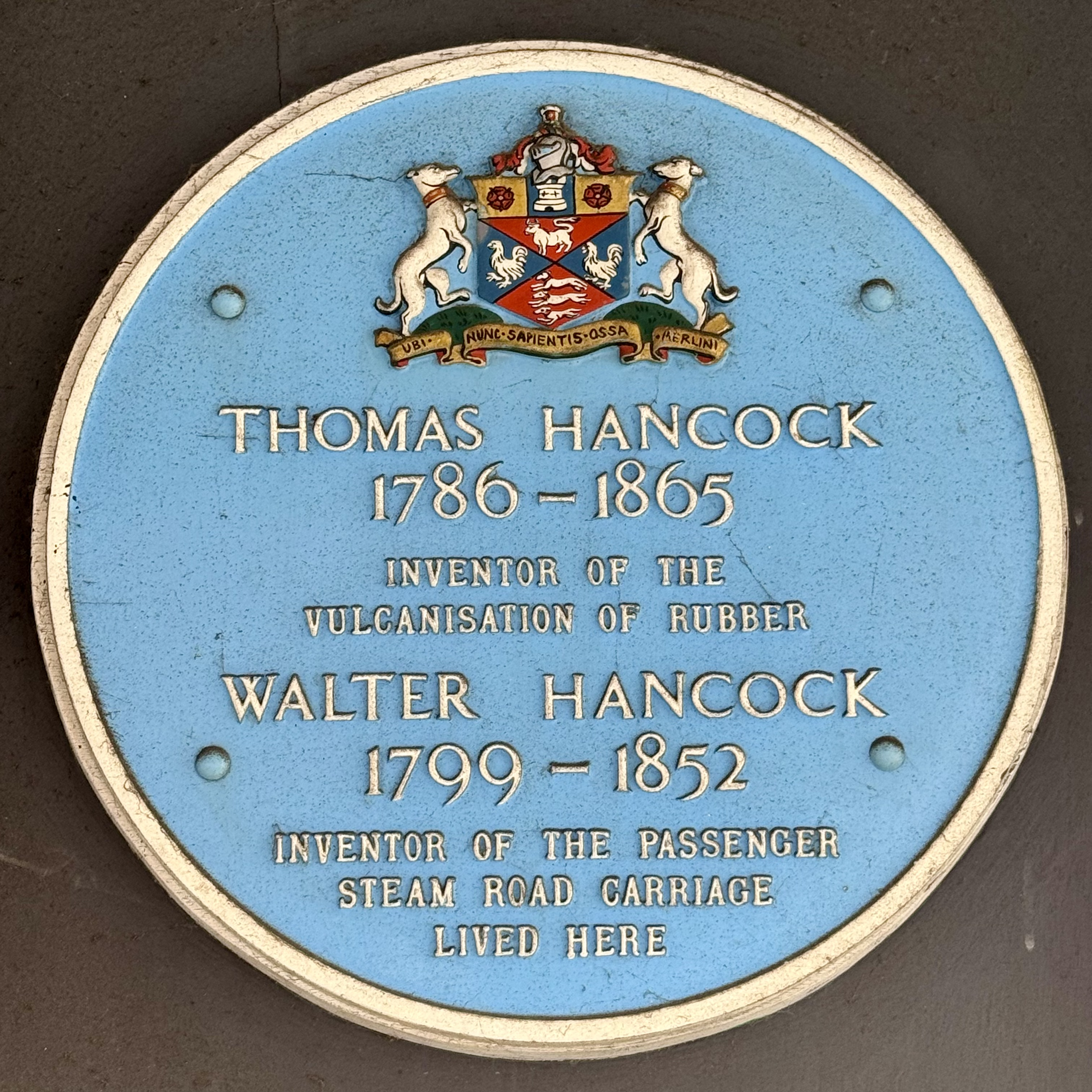
Blue plaque at no.4 High Street, Marlborough for Thomas and younger brother Walter

Hancock was born in 1786 in Marlborough, Wiltshire, and little is known about his early life. His father was a cabinet maker and it is possible that Thomas Hancock was trained in the same trade: in 1815 he is recorded as being in partnership with his brother, Walter, in London, as a coach builder.

== Career ==
Hancock's interest in rubber seems to have sprung from a desire to make waterproof fabrics to protect the passengers on his coaches. By 1819 he had begun to experiment with making rubber solutions. In 1820 he patented fastenings for gloves, suspenders, shoes and stockings; in the process of creating these early elastic fabrics, Hancock found himself wasting large amounts of rubber. He invented a machine to shred the waste rubber, his "Pickling machine" (or "masticator" as it is now known). He called it by the deceptive name of "Pickling" because he initially chose not to patent it, instead preferring to rely on secrecy.

In 1820, Hancock rented a factory in Goswell Road, London, where he worked raw rubber with the machines he had invented. His machines produced a warm mass of homogeneous rubber that could then be shaped and mixed with other materials, and was more easily dissolved than raw rubber. The prototype of his masticator was operated by one man and could only hold 3 oz (85 g); it was a wooden machine with a hollow cylinder studded with metal "teeth", with an inner studded core that was hand-cranked. By 1821 he had produced a two-man machine that held 1 lb (0.45 kg), and by 1841, he had created a machine that could process up to 200 lb (91 kg) of rubber at a time.

Hancock experimented with rubber solutions and in 1825 patented a process of making artificial leather using rubber solution and a variety of fibres. His choice of solvents, namely coal oil and turpentine, was probably influenced by Charles Macintosh's 1823 patent. In the same year he began working with Macintosh to manufacture his "double textured" fabric.

By 1830 it was obvious to everyone concerned that Hancock's leather solution, prepared with his masticated rubber, was better than Macintosh's. The two inventors merged their companies and began more fully co-operating, constructing, for example, an automatic spreading machine to replace the paint brushes previously used by Macintosh.

In 1834, Hancock's London factory burned down and Macintosh had already closed his Glasgow factory. The work was moved to Manchester where, in 1838, another fire destroyed that factory. A new factory was soon built and business continued as before, even though Macintosh's 1823 patent had expired in 1837. It was only in 1837 that Hancock finally patented both his masticator and spreader (UK patent 7,344).

Although the Macintosh style of coat has become generic (now know by the variant spelling "Mackintosh", abbreviated as mac or mack), the company that Hancock and Macintosh established lives on as two separate entities, Mackintosh and Hancock Vulcanised Articles. Both continue to make rubberised coats using the same techniques and procedures pioneered by the two inventors, with Hancock Vulcanised Articles alone continuing to use the original Victorian Mill for all fabric production.

=== Vulcanisation ===
External videos
- Booknotes interview with Charles Slack on Noble Obsession: Charles Goodyear, Thomas Hancock, and the Race to Unlock the Greatest Industrial Secret of the Nineteenth Century, 27 October 2002, C-SPAN

On 21 November 1843, Hancock took out a patent for the vulcanisation of rubber using sulphur, eight weeks before Charles Goodyear did in the US on 30 January 1844. He later mentioned in his memoirs that his friend William Brockedon had invented the word vulcanisation, from the god Vulcan of Roman mythology. Hancock did not credit himself with discovering the reaction of sulphur with rubber; he instead said that in 1842 Brockendon had shown him some American rubber samples which had been treated with sulphur. Hancock’s patent for the vulcanization method, filed 21 November 1843, was later upheld in British courts on the basis of both precedence and a want of international patent protection, together with Goodyear’s failure to maintain secrecy.

Brockendon later said in an affidavit that he never heard or knew of Hancock analysing the Goodyear samples, a claim Hancock verified, declaring that he had experimented with sulphur for many years himself. A number of chemists also swore that even if he had analysed Goodyear's material, this would not have given him enough information to duplicate the process. Alexander Parkes, inventor of the "cold cure" process (vulcanisation of fabrics using sulphur chloride in a carbon disulphide solution), asserted that both Hancock and Brockendon had admitted to him that their experiments on the Goodyear samples had enabled them to understand what Goodyear had done.

Unlike Goodyear, who was chiefly interested in rubber applications, Hancock developed machinery for processing rubber, which his firm put into use. The firm had large display stands at the Great Exhibition of 1851 in London and at the 1855 Exposition Universelle in Paris. In 1857 Hancock published the story of his life's work as Personal Narrative of the Origin and Progress of the Caoutchouc or India-Rubber Industry in England.

== Death ==
He died 26 March 1865, at Stoke Newington.

== Inspiration ==
Eiichiro Oda drew inspiration from Thomas Hancock to create the character Boa Hancock, who is in love with a man made of rubber in the Japanese manga and anime series One Piece.

== Bibliography ==
- This article incorporates text from a publication now in the public domain: Prosser, Richard Bissell (1890). "Hancock, Thomas (1786-1865)". In Stephen, Leslie; Lee, Sidney (eds.). Dictionary of National Biography. Vol. 24. London: Smith, Elder & Co.
- Hancock, Thomas (1857). Personal Narrative of the Origin and Progress of the Caoutchouc Or India-Rubber Manufacture in England. London: Longman, Brown, Green, Longmans, & Roberts.
- James, Francis and Loadman, John. The Hancocks of Marlborough. Oxford: Oxford University Press. 2010
