= Bonnington, Edinburgh =

Area of Edinburgh, Scotland

Coordinates: 55°58′15″N 3°10′45″W

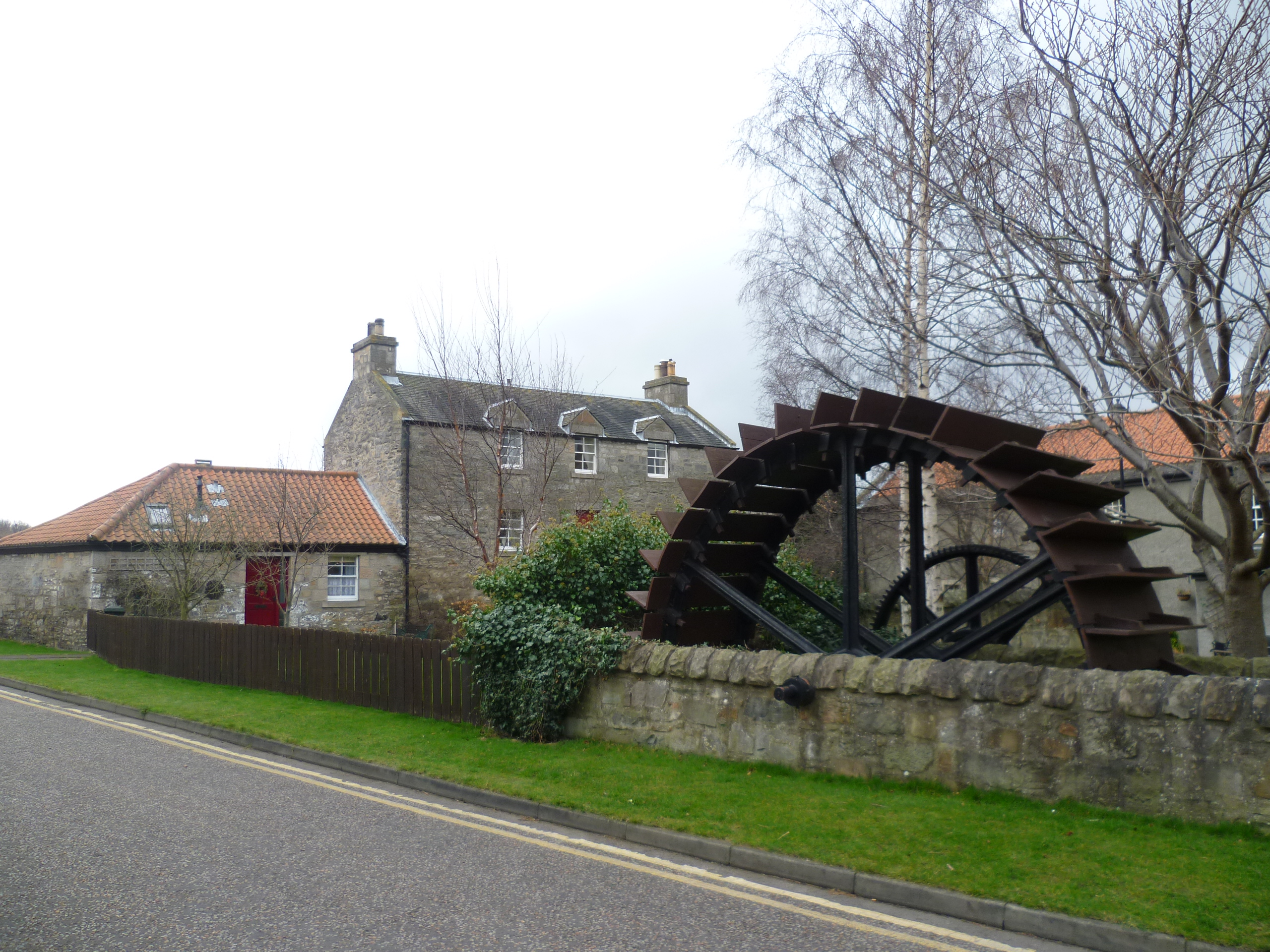
The old waterwheel at Bonnington Mills with Bonnyhaugh House and the old smiddy behind

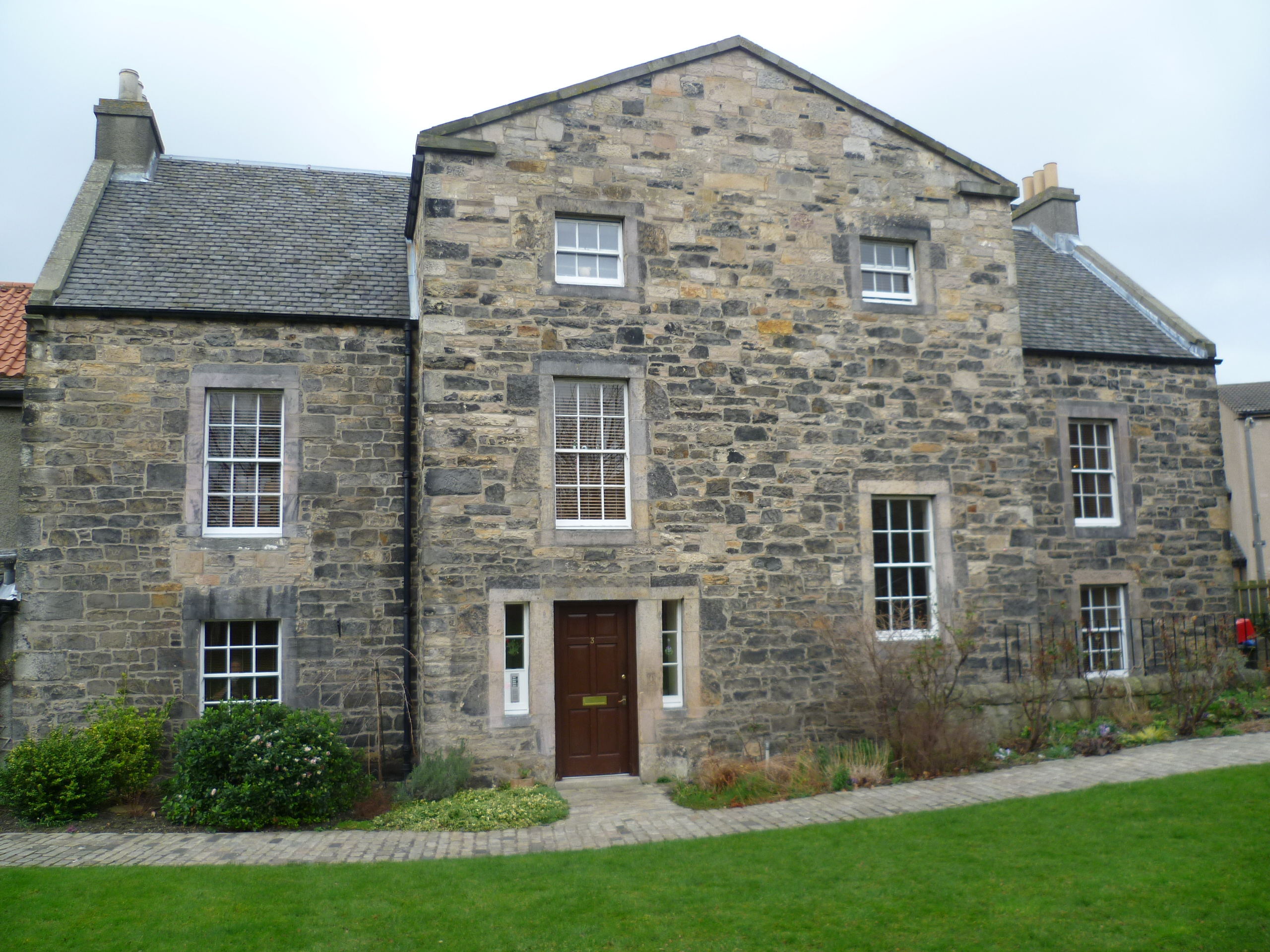
The old millhouse

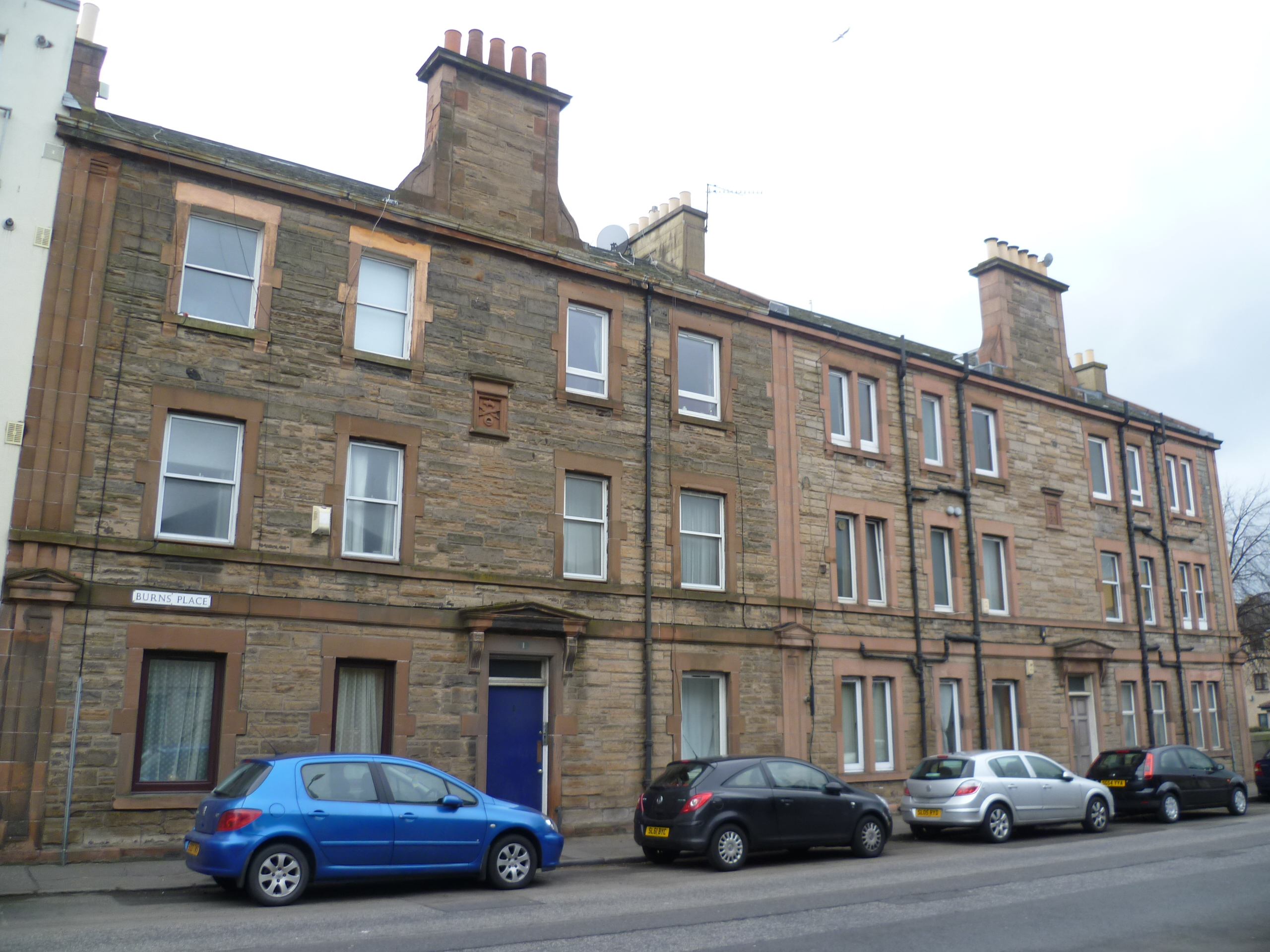
Burns tenement, Newhaven Road

Bonnington is a district of Edinburgh, the capital of Scotland. The area centres upon an original village which grew up around a ford on the Water of Leith, on the old boundary between Edinburgh and the port of Leith. Before the creation of Leith Walk, the road via the villages of Broughton and Bonnington, or Wester Road as it appears on some old maps, was one of two roads formerly connecting Edinburgh to Leith; the other being Easter Road. The district lies between the districts of Pilrig and Newhaven.

== History ==
The land and mills of Bonnytoun formed part of the Barony of Broughton mentioned in King David I's confirmation charter to the Abbey of Holyrood in 1143. Like the nearby village of Canonmills, Bonnington was a milling village making use of the river's water-power.

The village suffered in 1544 when the Earl of Hertford's army passed through on its way to attack Edinburgh and again in 1547 after the Scottish defeat in the Battle of Pinkie, both events in the period of conflict known as the Rough Wooing.

In 1617 the land and mills were sold to the Town Council of Edinburgh by the then landowners, the Logans of Restalrig. At the Council's invitation, a Dutchman Jeromias van der Heill was installed in 1621 as a dyer to teach his craft locally. The house built for him, named Bonnyhaugh by a later occupant, still stands. When the mill buildings were demolished in the face of local protests in the 1980s, the house was saved, restored and converted into private apartments. The low cottage at its side was the original dying room and later became a blacksmith's smiddy.

A waterwheel of the 'undershot' type, from the Bonnington Mills, has been saved and in the 1980s was moved to a new position on the site of the mill lade. The water level in the lade was controlled by a sluice gate at the nearby weir at Redbraes. The water power generated was used to mill grain, weave cloth, tan leather and manufacture paper.

Bonnington Road became a toll road at the end of the 18th century, hence the name Bonnington Toll at the Newhaven Road junction. The old toll house at the Leith end still exists, an abandoned two storey stone house on the edge of the Swanfield Industrial Estate.

A bridge over the ford was built in 1812 and replaced by the present bridge in 1902–03.

In 1832, Robert Burns' skinworks occupied the site of Bonnington Mills. The Burns tenement, built on Newhaven Road to house the tannery workers, was renovated in the 1970s. A stone tablet on the tenement depicts a sheep and the tools of the tanner's trade.

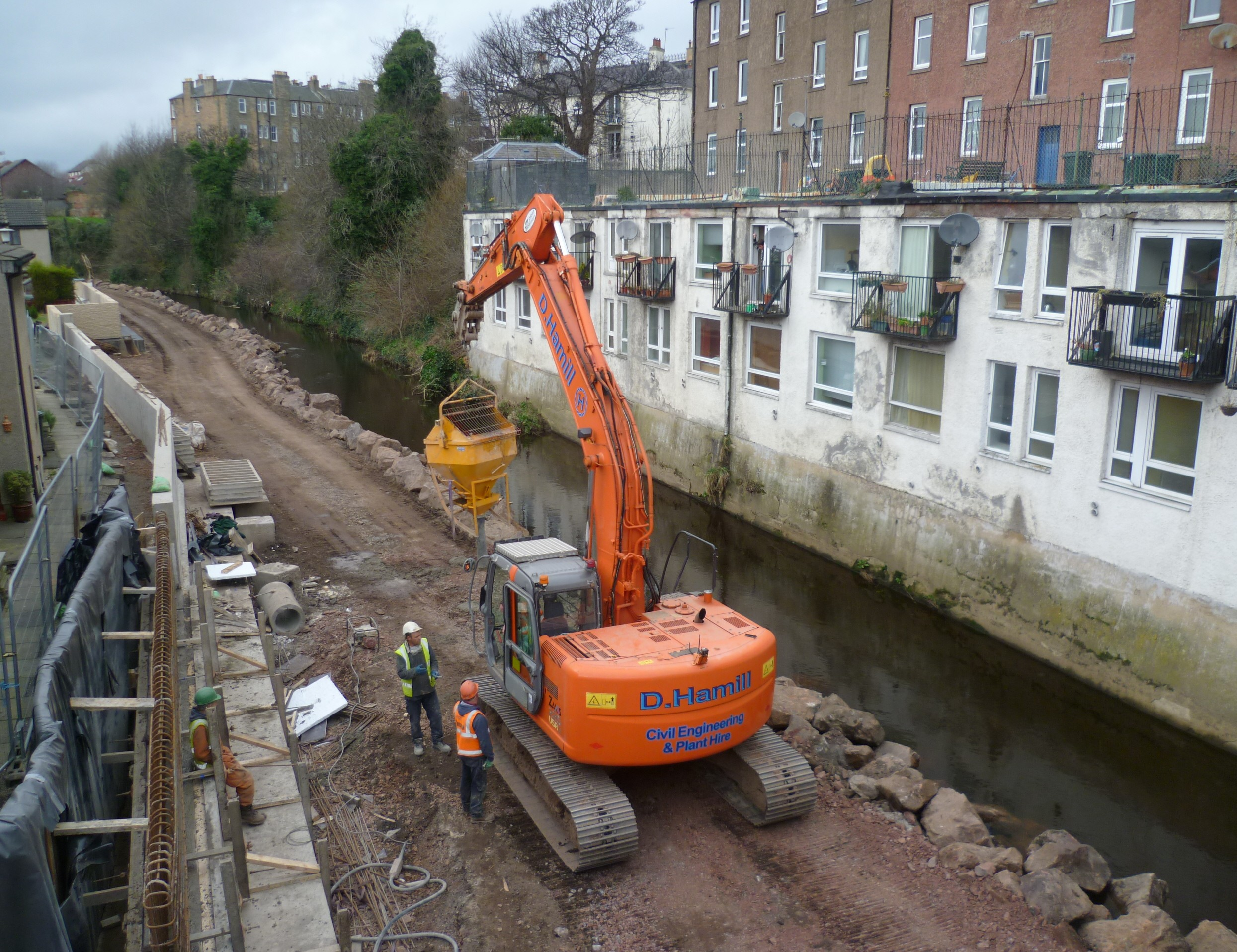
Construction of flood defences, 2012

The Bonnington Chemical Works on Newhaven Road processed residues from the manufacture of coal gas in Edinburgh. Starting up in 1822, it remained operational for half a century.

In the 19th and 20th centuries, the area on the north side of Bonnington Road stretching eastwards to Leith became one of mixed types of industrial, business and retail premises, including a major printer's works, sugar bond and engineering works. Some of these premises have been abandoned or converted to new uses in recent decades. One of the larger developments in the area from the 1980s is the storage depot of the John Lewis Partnership in Bonnington Road Lane (this includes a minor public pick-up counter for some items).[Now demolished - redeveloped as Residential properties}

The former Bonnington Church (of the Church of Scotland) united with North Leith Parish Church in 1968, with the united congregation thenceforth using the North Leith Parish Church building in Madeira Street, Leith.

New housing built along the river bank has changed the face of the area around Bonnington Mills and necessitated work on improving flood defences.

The former Bonnington Primary School reopened on 16 August 2013 as Bun-sgoil Taobh na Pàirce: Edinburgh's first Gaelic Medium School.

== Industries ==
A core of industries and businesses lay on either side of the Water of Leith.

- Aeries Frameworks, a steel bicycle frame builder
- The original Chancelot Mill (replaced by a modern structure in Leith Docks)
- Dofos dog food factory
- Bonnington Chemical Works (1822–1878)
- Powderhall Bronze, a modern foundry
- The Scottish tachometer centre
- Dulux Paints
- Farmer Jacks
- A huge whisky bond at Anderson Place (now converted to housing)
- James Pringle shopping warehouse
- A stone and marble yard
- The cardboard box factory on Bonnington Road (now converted to housing).

Graham Street was cleared of traditional tenements in the 1960s to build low-grade industry but by 2000 was rebuilt as housing, including an unusual white block for Port of Leith Housing Association. Whilst industrial uses were protected in the area, recent planning changes have led to residential uses being likely to take over altogether.

== Notable people from Bonnington ==
- Leslie Balfour-Melville
- Robert Keith, one-time resident of Bonnyhaugh House
- Edmund Ronalds. He lived at Bonnington House.
