= Thai Dang =

Vietnamese Americans chef

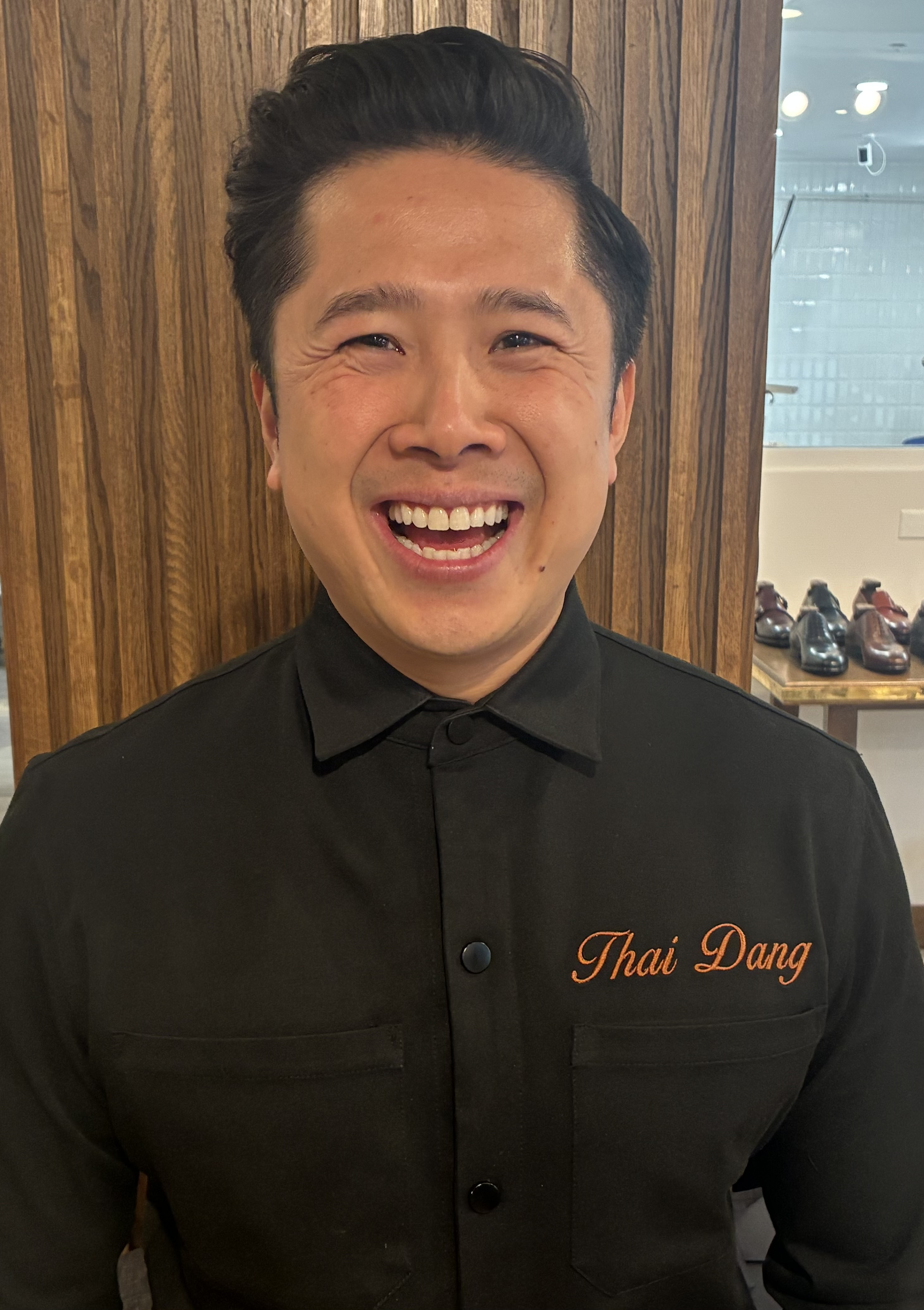
Chef Thai Dang

Thai Dang is executive chef of HaiSous Vietnamese Kitchen and Crying Tiger in Chicago.

His West Loop, Chicago restaurant Embeya was an Esquire magazine best new restaurant winner. Embeya closed in 2015 after his business partner committed a $300,000 embezzlement and fled the country to Spain. In 2020 a federal judge sentenced Attila Gyulai to three years of probation after he pled guilty to wire fraud following his arrest and extradition from Spain.

Dang's next restaurant HaiSous opened in 2017 in Pilsen, Chicago, and reached the semi-final for the James Beard Award for Best New Restaurant. In 2022, Dang’s restaurants Dang Good Wings and Cà Phê Đá opened on campus at the University of Chicago. In 2024 Dang continued collaborating with Black Sheep Restaurants in Hong Kong at their Vietnamese concepts Le Garçon Saigon and Chôm Chôm. Dang was a finalist for best chef Great Lakes at the 2025 James Beard Awards. In October 2025 Peter Cincotti and Chef Thai Dang co-hosted Paul Stuart's anniversary party celebrating 30 years in Chicago.

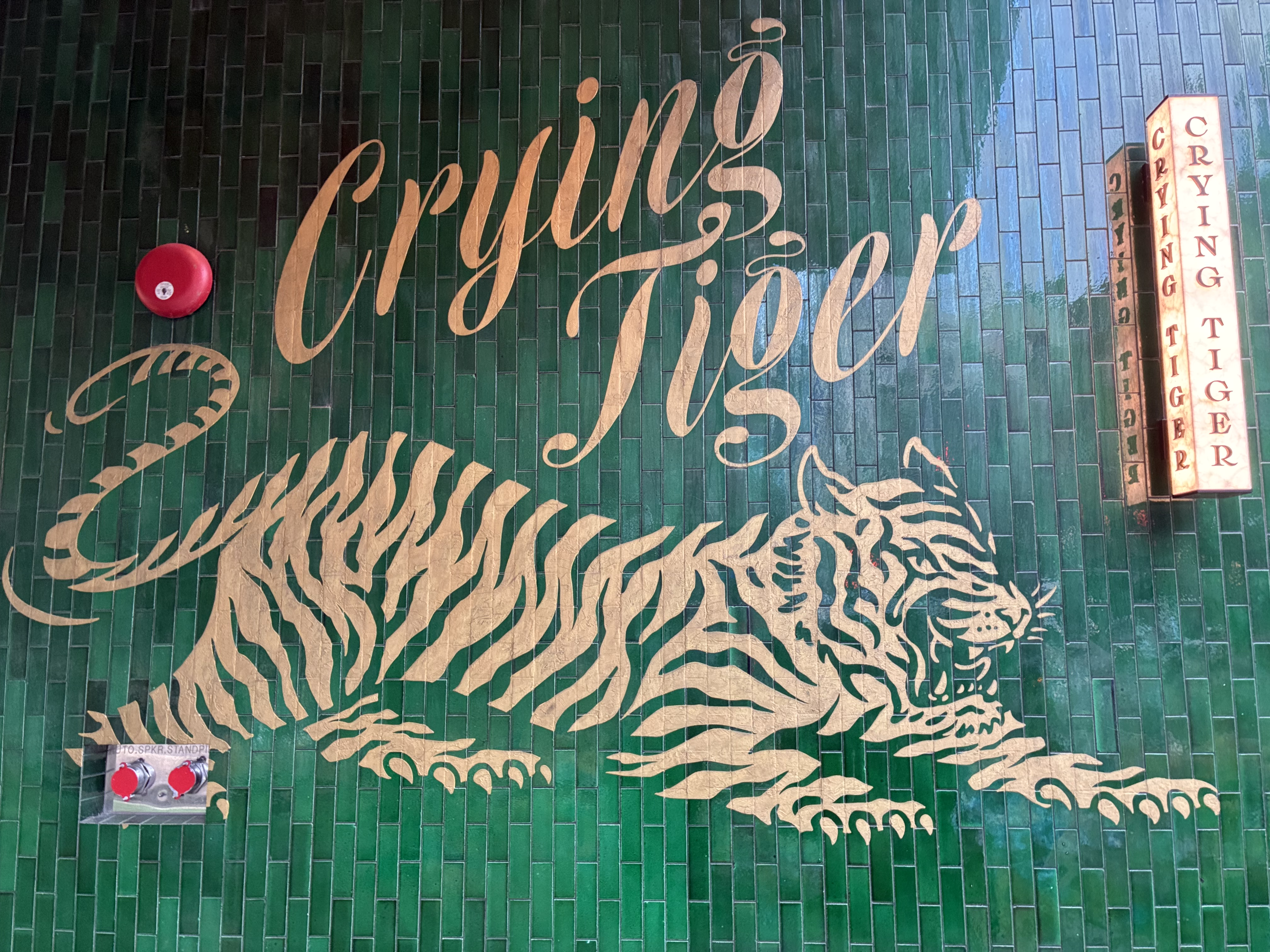
Mural at Crying Tiger restaurant in Chicago

Crying Tiger in River North on Hubbard Street is Dang’s first restaurant concept with Lettuce Entertain You Enterprises. Robb Report named Crying Tiger among the most anticipated restaurants to open in 2025. Dang was nominated Best Chef: Great Lakes for the 2026 James Beard Awards. Crying Tiger was named to Robb Report’s list of the 21 "Most Beautiful New Restaurants in America of 2025."

Dang cites Laurent Gras of L_{2}O among his culinary influences.

== Personal life ==
Dang was born in Dong Nai province, the youngest child among six brothers and three sisters. In 1989, the family fled Vietnam as refugees to Bataan, the Philippines, and later settled in Champaign-Urbana, Illinois sponsored by a Catholic non-profit organisation.

== See also ==
- James Beard Foundation Award: 2020s
- Charles Phan
- Yia Vang
