= Clifford Grodd =

American clothier (1924–2010)

Clifford Grodd (April 27, 1924 – May 25, 2010) was an American clothier who served as president and chief executive of the Paul Stuart men's and women's clothing retailer.

== Early life and military experience ==
Grodd was born on April 27, 1924, in New Haven, Connecticut. He was a tail gunner with the United States Army Air Corps during World War II. After being shot down while flying on a mission over Hungary, he was captured and placed in a prison camp from which he made nine escape attempts, but was not liberated from the camp until near the war's end.

== Career ==
After completing his military service, he finished his undergraduate degree from the University of Connecticut, graduating in 1948 with a degree in marketing. He worked at G. Fox & Co.'s flagship store in Hartford, Connecticut, where he was employed as assistant manager of the sportswear department as part of that company's executive training program.

He was hired by Paul Stuart in 1951 by his father-in-law Ralph Ostrove who had founded the clothing store in 1938. Grodd bought the store from Ostrove, who wanted to retire due to his failing health. Grodd was named president and chief executive of the company in 1955 and transformed the company into one that became an arbiter of taste, style and fashion. He led the way in establishing Paul Stuart's own brands and the store attracted the loyalty of individuals including Fred Astaire, Mel Brooks, Cary Grant, Paul Newman and Frank Sinatra. He expanded the firm into Japan through a licensing deal with Mitsui, and also opened locations in Chicago and Seoul, South Korea. He remained as CEO until his death, arriving at the company's store in New York City each day after an early-morning workout. In the years before his death, Grodd had expanded the company's line to include the Phineas Cole label aimed at younger clientele, offered in the company's own stores and its 100 licensed locations worldwide.

== Death and legacy ==
Grodd died of cancer at age 86 on May 25, 2010 at his home in Manhattan. He was survived by his wife, the former Barbara Ostrove, two sons and two grandchildren.

== See also ==
- Bergdorf Goodman
- Barney Pressman
- Fred Pressman
- Ralph Lauren
