= Broadstreet's =

Clothing business in New York City

Broadstreet's was a clothing business originally located at 576 - 578 Fifth Avenue in New York City.

Harry Ostrove started a men's store called Broadstreet's around the time of World War I. By the 1920's, it had grown into a chain of three or four stores; it was sold in 1928, although Mr. Ostrove's father remained as president until 1937.

The company was founded by Ralph D. Schneider, who was born in New York City, and entered the clothing business upon graduation from high school. He built Broadstreet's into a chain of a dozen stores in New York City and Chicago and sold the chain to the Botany group in 1957, remaining with the company and supervising its 92 clothing stores until his resignation in 1968.

In August 1933 the firm leased the entire ground floor, mezzanine, and basement of a building at 5th Avenue and 47th Street, along with other stores in New York City. The lease was negotiated by the R.B. Wattley Company, Inc., and the Cross & Brown Company. The property extended 50 X 100 feet. Broadstreet's paid an estimated $50,000 per year for rent.

By 1967 Broadstreet's was a menswear division of Botany Industries, Inc. In July 1967 Louis Wynn was made president of Broadstreet's. He had joined the company in 1936. In 1973 Botany went bankrupt and the Broadstreet shops were closed.

Harry Ostrove's son founded clothier Paul Stuart in 1938; Paul Stuart is still headquartered in New York City.
