= Sanyo Shokai =

Japanese clothing company

Sanyo Shokai 三陽商会
- Type: Public
- Industry: Retail
- Founded: May 11, 1943
- Founder: Nobuyuki Yoshihara
- Headquarters: Tokyo, Japan
- Area served: Japan, United States
- Products: Clothing
- Parent: Sanyo Shokai, Ltd.
- Website: https://www.sanyo-shokai.co.jp/

Sanyo Shokai (Japanese: 三陽商会) is a Japanese apparel maker and distributor founded in Itabashi, Tokyo in 1943. It is currently headquartered in Shinjuku. The company name (三陽) was inspired from the "three" (三) of powerful conglomerates such as Mitsui (三井) and Mitsubishi (三菱), and the "yō" (陽) from the name of the founder's father.

== Brands ==
Its women’s brands include: Amaca, Blue Label Crestbidge, Cast, CB Crestbridge, Ecoalf, Epoca, Evex by Krizia, Lovelesss, Mackintosh London, Mackintosh Philosophy, Paul Stuart, S. Essentials, Sanyocoat, Story & the Study, To Be Chic, Trans Work.

Its men’s brands include: Black Label Crestbridge, Cast, CB Crestbridge, Ecoalf, Epoca Uomo, Lovelesss, Mackintosh London, Mackintosh Philosophy, Paul Stuart, S. Essentials, Sanyocoat, Sanyo Yamacho, Story & the Study, The Scotch House, Baker Street.

Brands for men and women are: SANYO COAT, 100年コート, S.ESSENTIALS, and Sanyo Yamacho.

The Crestbridge brands were created after the company lost its licensing agreement with Burberry.

== History ==
Sanyo Shokai, Ltd. is a Tokyo based company that was founded in 1943 by Nobuyuki Yoshihara (吉原信之 1916-2007).

Nobuyuki Yoshihara established the company during the war to repair, process and sell machine tools in Tokyo with the aim of manufacturing and selling various electrical industrial products and textile products. The company name was inspired from the "three" (三) of powerful conglomerates such as Mitsui (三井) and Mitsubishi (三菱), and the "yo" (陽) of founder Yoshihara's father.

In August 1945, just after the end of the war, the company sold its head office factory in Itabashi and moved its head office to Ginza. It began manufacturing and selling raincoats made from blackout curtains used during the war. In 1949, the company received a large order to sew raincoats for the "National Export Bazaar" organized by Daiichi Tsusho (now Mitsui & Co.), and emerged as a major manufacturer and seller of raincoats. In 1951, the company registered the trademark "Sanyo Raincoats" for its raincoats. At the same time, the company began selling to department stores around the country, and in 1953, its "Duster Coat" was selected as the best product in a competition organized by Ginza Matsuya. In 1959, the company introduced an adaptation of the coat worn by actress Jacqueline Sassard in the French film March's Child. It was named "Sassard Coat" and sold for a Japanese audience. This became a hit, and the company began to grow from manufacturing and selling raincoats into a comprehensive apparel manufacturer.

From 1965, the company began selling coats made by the British company Burberry, and from 1969, it began to license the domestic production of products from Burberry and other overseas coat manufacturers through technical collaborations. At the same time, the company has actively developed fashion brands targeting various generations, and currently operates a number of fashion brands, including the women's brands "EPOCA" and "FRAGILE".

A major turning point for the company was the termination of its license agreement with Burberry on June 30, 2015. As a result, sales of Burberry in Japan were handled directly by the British headquarters through a Japanese subsidiary.

Since then, as a successor brand to "Burberry London," the company has partnered with Mackintosh, a long-established clothing company that makes waterproof coats from Scotland (acquired by Yagi Tsusho in 2007) to launch "Mackintosh London," converting about 260 of the approximately 350 former Burberry stores, and also rebranding the youth-oriented women's clothing "Burberry Blue Label" and men's clothing "Burberry Black Label" to "Blue Label Crestbridge" and "Black Label Crestbridge," respectively, with new designers.

However, the loss of Burberry was a huge blow, and performance after the shift to focusing on its own brands has been sluggish. Four voluntary retirements have been offered and three presidents have been replaced, and the company is currently in the process of reconstruction, with the US investment company, the largest shareholder, calling for a renewal of management and a sale of the company, and the flagship store building in Ginza being sold.

Sanyo Shokai New York was founded in 1978.

In 1986, Sanyo Shokai New York started building its own state-of-the-art production facility in Oneonta, New York and opened that following year. Other locations had been considered, such as Connecticut and Georgia. However, with the closing of a textile factory in Oneonta, Sanyo chose the upstate New York location to hire experienced local textile workers.

In 1988, Sanyo Fashion House Co. Ltd. Italy opened in Milan.

In 1990, Sanyo Fashion House worked with costume designer Carol Cohen to transform the classic trench coat into a fashion raincoat.

In 1999, Sanyo Sewing America closed.

In 2001, Sanyo held a promotional agreement with Palm to redesign Sanyo coats for the business traveler, featuring antimagnetic shields to prevent shock from static electricity and protection from radio waves.

In 2007, Sanyo Shokai New York, Inc. went online for the first time at with the launch of the Fall 2007 collection.

In the subsequent years, Sanyo designed RainWool, a series of wool overcoats that have the same impermeability to rain that their micro polyester raincoats offer.
