= Bonnington Chemical Works =

Chemical plant in Edinburgh, Scotland

Coordinates: 55.970903°N 3.186236°W

The Bonnington Chemical Works was a pioneer coal tar processing plant established in Edinburgh. It was perhaps the first successful independent facility established for the integrated treatment of gasworks waste, and manufactured the residues of the Edinburgh gasworks into useful products for over half a century.

== History ==
Gas lighting was introduced in Edinburgh in 1818. The production of coal gas generated considerable residues of coal tar and ammoniacal liquor which were further processed at the Bonnington Chemical Works. The Bonnington facility was located on Newhaven Road in Bonnington (between Edinburgh and Leith) near the south bank of the Water of Leith.

George Dixon Longstaff recorded that the chemical works began in 1822 for the purpose of distilling coal tar to separate naphtha. This was supplied to Charles Macintosh for him to make waterproof fabrics, as epitomised by the Mackintosh. Longstaff was at that time assistant to Dr John Wilson Anderson, who taught practical chemistry at the University of Edinburgh. When Anderson resigned from the university to concentrate on his growing chemical plant, Longstaff took his academic post.

By 1830, the factory was making and selling naphtha, pitch oil (later called creosote), pitch, and lampblack (carbon black) from the coal tar, while the ammoniacal liquor was processed into sal ammoniac (ammonium chloride). Anderson also made the sulphuric acid and hydrochloric acid he needed in processing and sold the associated products magnesium carbonate and sodium sulphate. Anderson believed he was the first in Britain to commence making black ash and soda ash (sodium carbonate) using the Leblanc process when the salt tax was repealed in 1823. For some years he also made soap. Macintosh remained a special customer until at least the late 1830s, and probably well beyond, receiving a significant discount on his large naphtha orders.

When Anderson died in 1835, his brother-in-law Thomas Astley (son of chemical manufacturer Joseph Astley) took on the management of the plant and introduced the further products ammonium sulphate fertiliser and asphalt road surfacing.

In 1847, the works was taken over by John Tennant and John Tennent, who had both been close associates of Macintosh. Tennant was the eldest son of industrialist Charles Tennant, and Tennent was of the Tennent family who ran Wellpark Brewery. The firm became one of the Tennant group of companies. They added to the product line sodium sulphite and sodium thiosulphate (which they sold as antichlor) and copper sulphide marine anti-fouling paint. The large scale of processing precipitated the construction of a pipeline to pump the gasworks residues directly from Edinburgh to Bonnington over Calton Hill.

Tennent's brother-in-law Dr Edmund Ronalds took over the management of the plant in 1856. He retained most of the existing products and conducted further distillations to make benzene and also coke oil and coke. Products were shipped as far as Russia and America. He commissioned a new acid plant in which sulphuric and hydrochloric acids and sulphurous acid gas were made and introduced waste gas capture equipment and a large new chimney to reduce emissions. The facility now occupied close to three acres.

The plant was closed in 1878 after Ronalds had suffered chronic ill health for some years.
