= Mac in a Sac =

Waterproof jacket manufactured by Target Dry

Mac in a Sac is a waterproof jacket manufactured by Target Dry in Belfast, Northern Ireland. The jacket has been produced since 1987

Distributed globally, Mac in a Sac is a part of packable waterproof collection.
