= Paul Stuart =

Men's luxury clothing brand founded in 1938 in New York City

Coordinates: 40.754941°N 73.978672°W

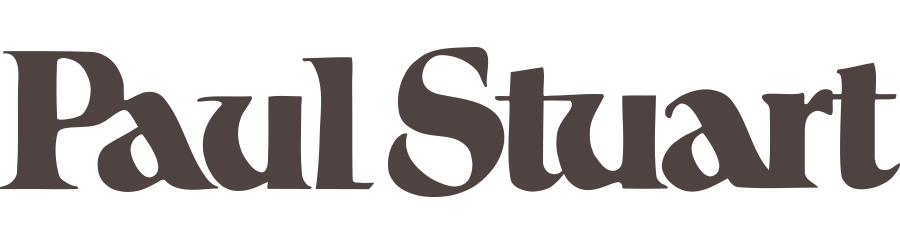
- Type: Private
- Industry: Clothing and shoes
- Founded: New York, New York, 1938
- Headquarters: New York, New York
- Key people: Ralph Ostrove (founder); Clifford Grodd; Michael Ostrove
- Products: Men's clothing
- Website: paulstuart.com

Paul Stuart is a men's traditional Ivy style clothing brand founded in 1938 in New York City. Currently operating four standalone boutiques in the US, Paul Stuart has been described as a blend of “Savile Row, Connecticut living and the concrete canyons of New York.” The Paul Stuart logo is a drawing of fictional character Dink Stover at Yale University.

The brand was owned by Mitsui from 2012 to 2025. Worldwide rights to the brand outside Japan were acquired by Middle West Partners, a Boston-based private equity firm, in partnership with Peerless Clothing in 2025. Paul Stuart Japan is owned by Sanyo Shokai, which purchased the rights from Mitsui in 2021. The Japanese brand is vended at a flagship store in Aoyama, Tokyo and hundreds of Japanese department stores. John Hutchison, former chief executive officer of Bonobos, was appointed the new CEO of Paul Stuart.

== History ==
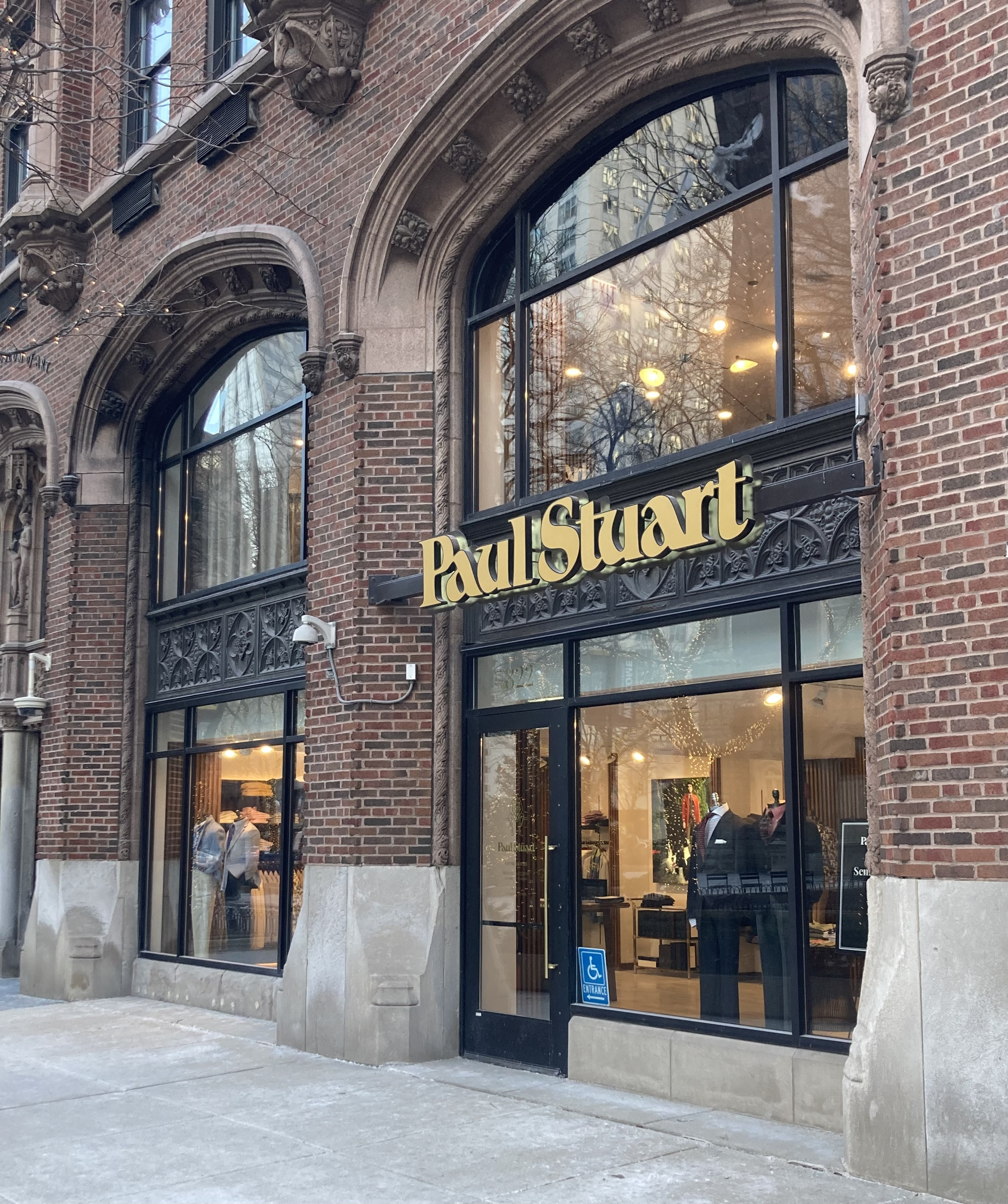
Paul Stuart Chicago store Michigan Avenue entrance

Harry Ostrove started Broadstreet's men's clothing stores in New York City in 1915, and Ralph Ostrove worked for his father. Ralph Ostrove struck out on his own in 1938 to start Paul Stuart, so named for his son, Paul Stuart Ostrove. The flagship store opened on March 7, 1938 and has continued at the same location at the intersection of 45th Street and Madison Avenue.

The company was helmed by the legendary merchant and CEO Clifford Grodd from 1958 until his death in 2010. Paul Stuart Ostrove, the brand's namesake and executive vice president, had died on November 21, 2004.

In fall 2007, Paul Stuart launched its Phineas Cole range, which is luxury clothing with a slimmer silhouette designed to appeal to a younger, less conservative clientele.

The retailer had remained a privately-held family business until December 2012, when it was sold to its long-time Japanese partners, Mitsui, who then sold the business to private investment group Middle West Partners for an undisclosed sum in December 2025.

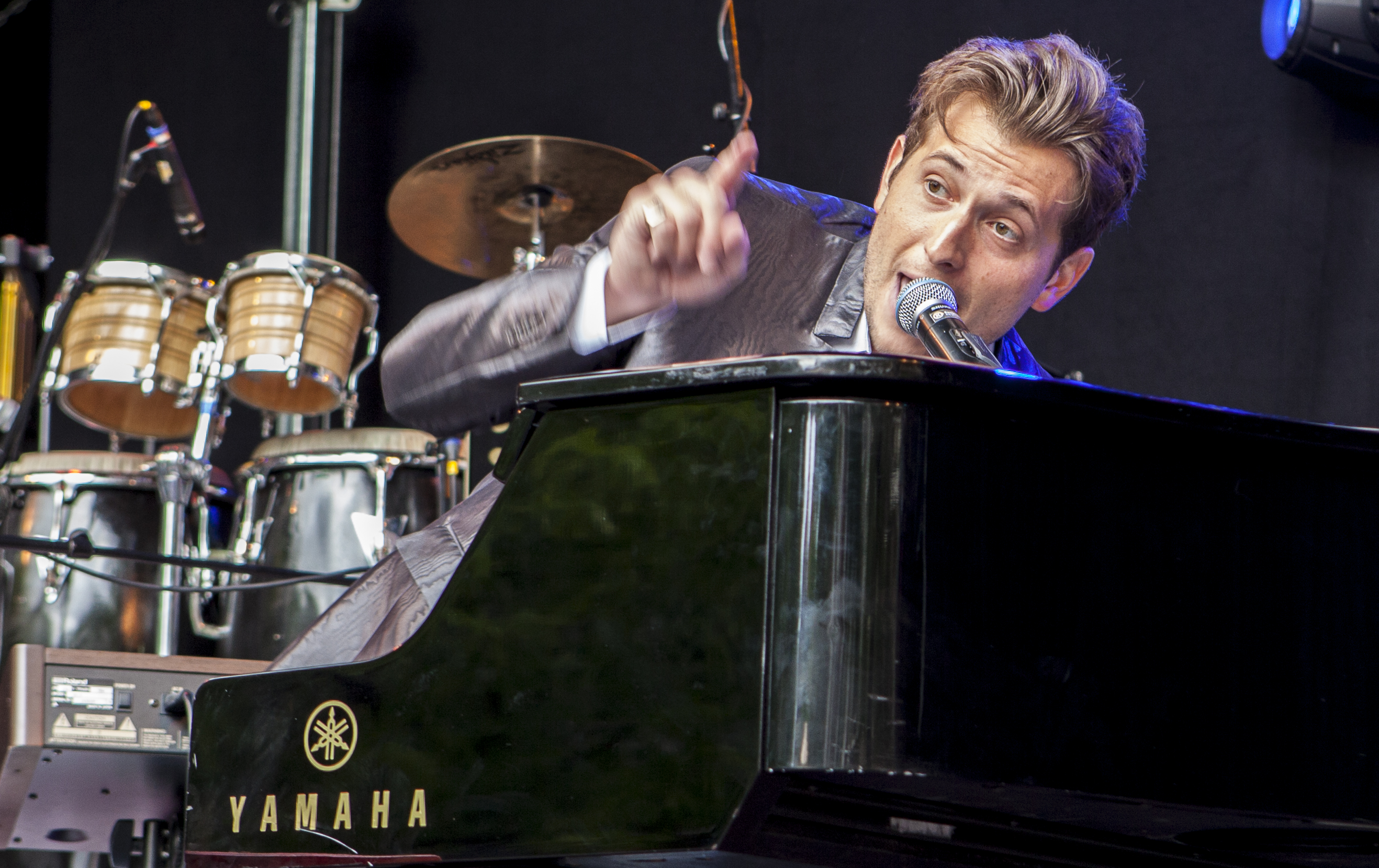
Peter Cincotti wore Paul Stuart for his Café Carlyle residency in 2024 and 2025

Paulette Garafalo, formerly of Brooks Brothers and Hickey Freeman, became CEO of Paul Stuart on June 14, 2016, marking the first time someone unrelated to the Ostrove family led the company. Mitsui had begun importing Paul Stuart products to Japan in 1975. In Mitsui 1991 signed an exclusive licensing agreement to produce and sell Paul Stuart products in Japan, with Sanyo Shokai Ltd as its main sub-licensee. Paul Stuart’s sales in Japan reached about $133 million in 2012. Paul Stuart Japan’s 100 shops in department stores and outlet stores, as well as e-commerce sites, are all operated by Sanyo Shokai.

The company offers bespoke tailoring by Oxxford Clothes, and previously carried Oxxford on the rack. In 2019, the company began offering a made-to-measure service branded as customLAB, including luxury MTM jeans service. In 2019, the company celebrated the redesign and launch of its omnichannel e-commerce website with home delivery via vintage Packard automobile.

On July 1, 2022, Paulette Garafalo stepped away from day-to-day operations and assumed a new role as Executive Chairman. Trevor Shimpfky was announced as president and CEO, and oversaw the addition of new stores, the ceasing of womenswear production, and efforts to attract a younger clientele. Prior to joining Paul Stuart, he served as vice president of wholesale for North America at Ermenegildo Zegna for 16 years. The longtime creative director was Ralph Auriemma, who had been hired away from Ralph Lauren Purple Label in 2007 to develop the youthful Phineas Cole sub-brand.

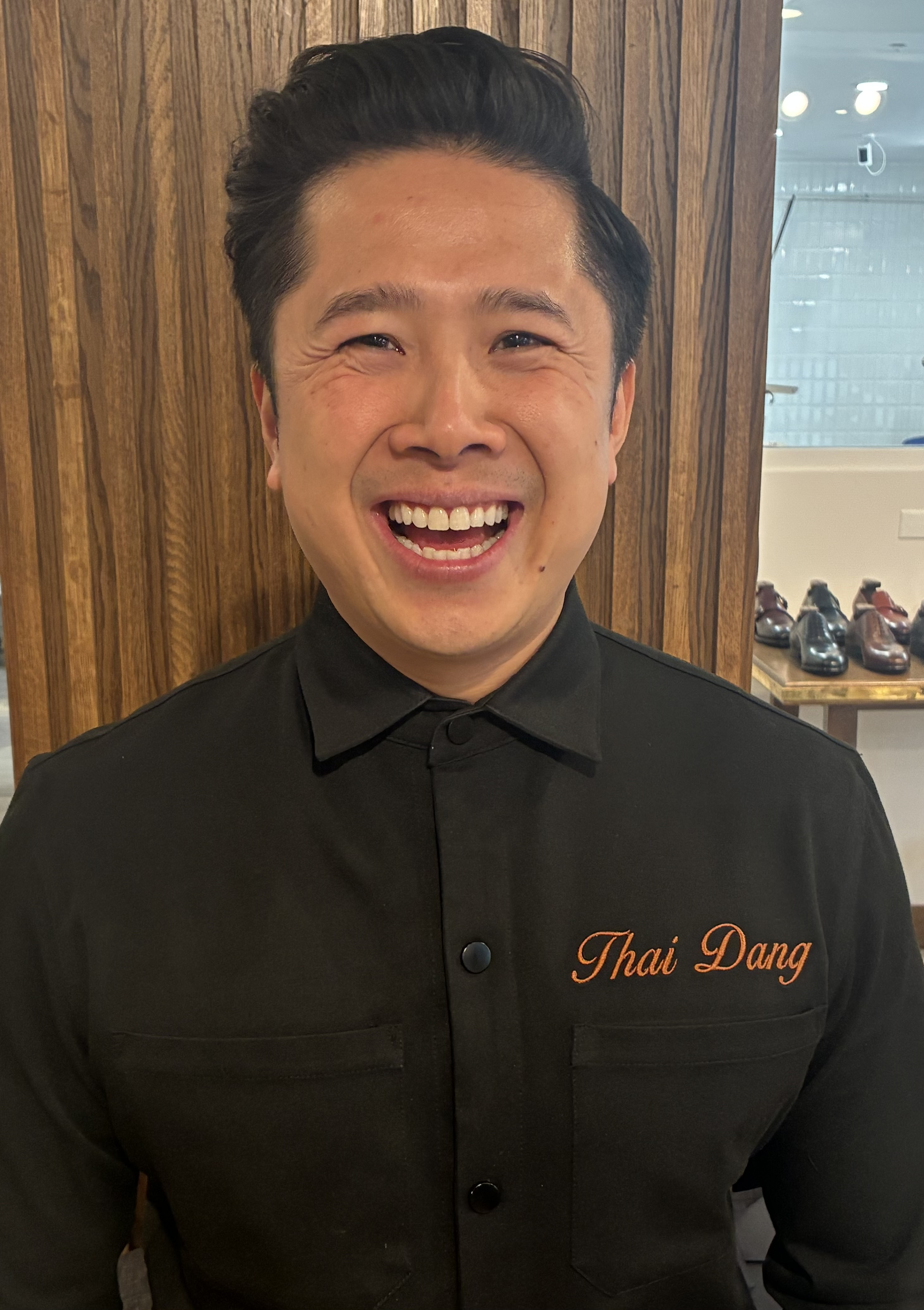
Chef Thai Dang dressed in custom Paul Stuart at the 2025 James Beard Awards

In 2024 and 2025, Paul Stuart dressed jazz singer Peter Cincotti for his Café Carlyle residency, and sold a limited-edition vinyl album recorded live. In October 2025 Peter Cincotti and Chef Thai Dang co-hosted the brand's party celebrating 30 years in Chicago.

In December 2025 private investment group Middle West Partners and apparel manufacturer Peerless Clothing Inc. acquired Paul Stuart from Mitsui & Co., Ltd. The Japanese business will continue to be operated by Sanyo Shokai, which purchased the rights from Mitsui in 2021. Michael Hamp, a co-founder of Middle West Partners and member of the Ford family, stated upon the brand acquisition: “Paul Stuart has been one of my family’s favorite brands for more than 25 years. It has a look that’s distinctly its own—when you walk down the street, you know it’s Paul Stuart. My father and now my brothers and I have worn Paul Stuart for as long as I can remember. It is both a privilege and honor to take on the responsibility of stewarding this brand.” Middle West Partners also own jeweler David Webb. Following the acquisition, CEO Trevor Shimpfky and longtime creative director Ralph Auriemma left the company.

In October 2026, Paul Stuart Aoyama hosted a pop-up shop for Japanese denim brand RESOLUTE.

== Retail locations ==
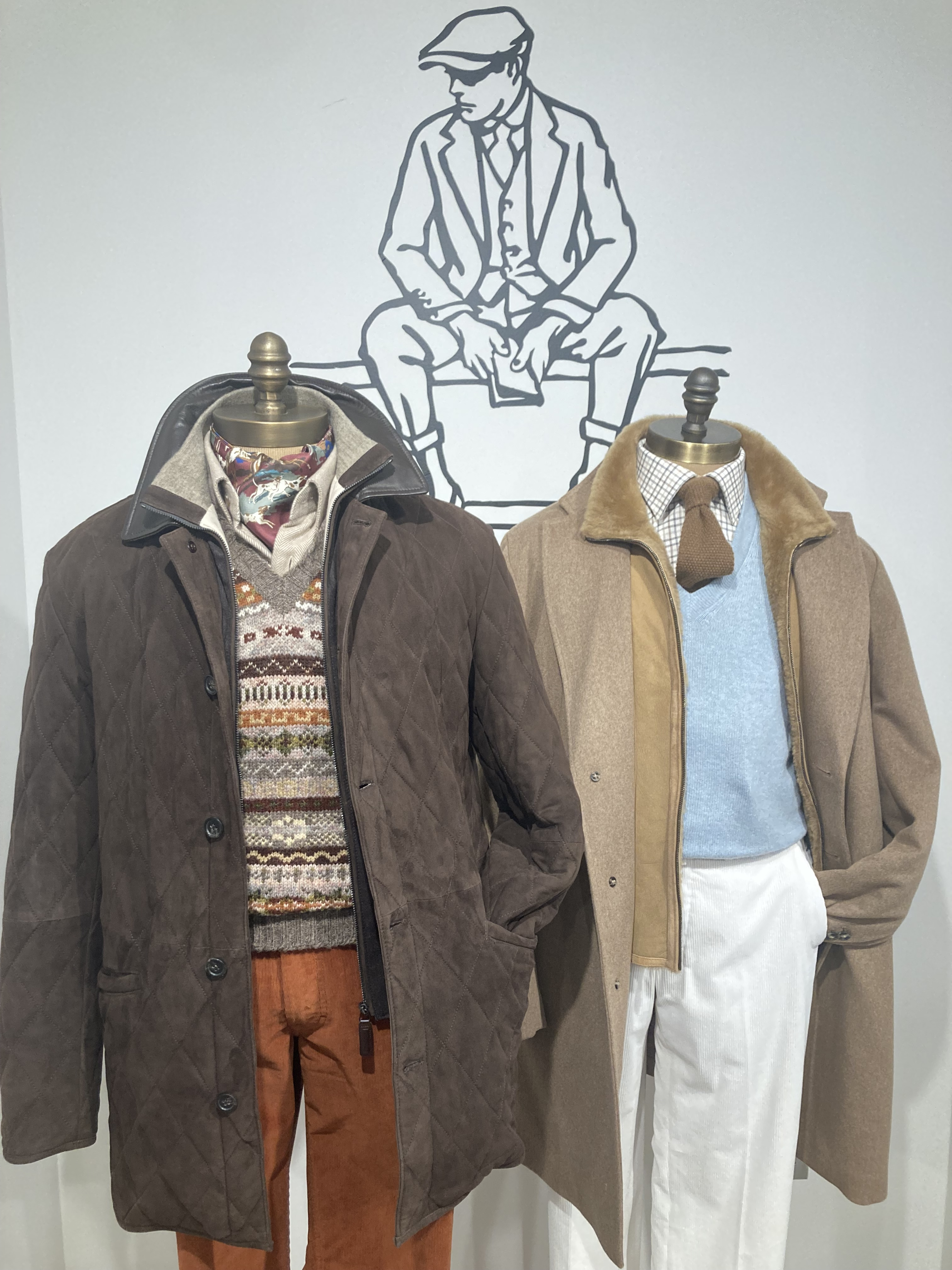
Two mannequins dressed in Paul Stuart fall/winter 2024 garments

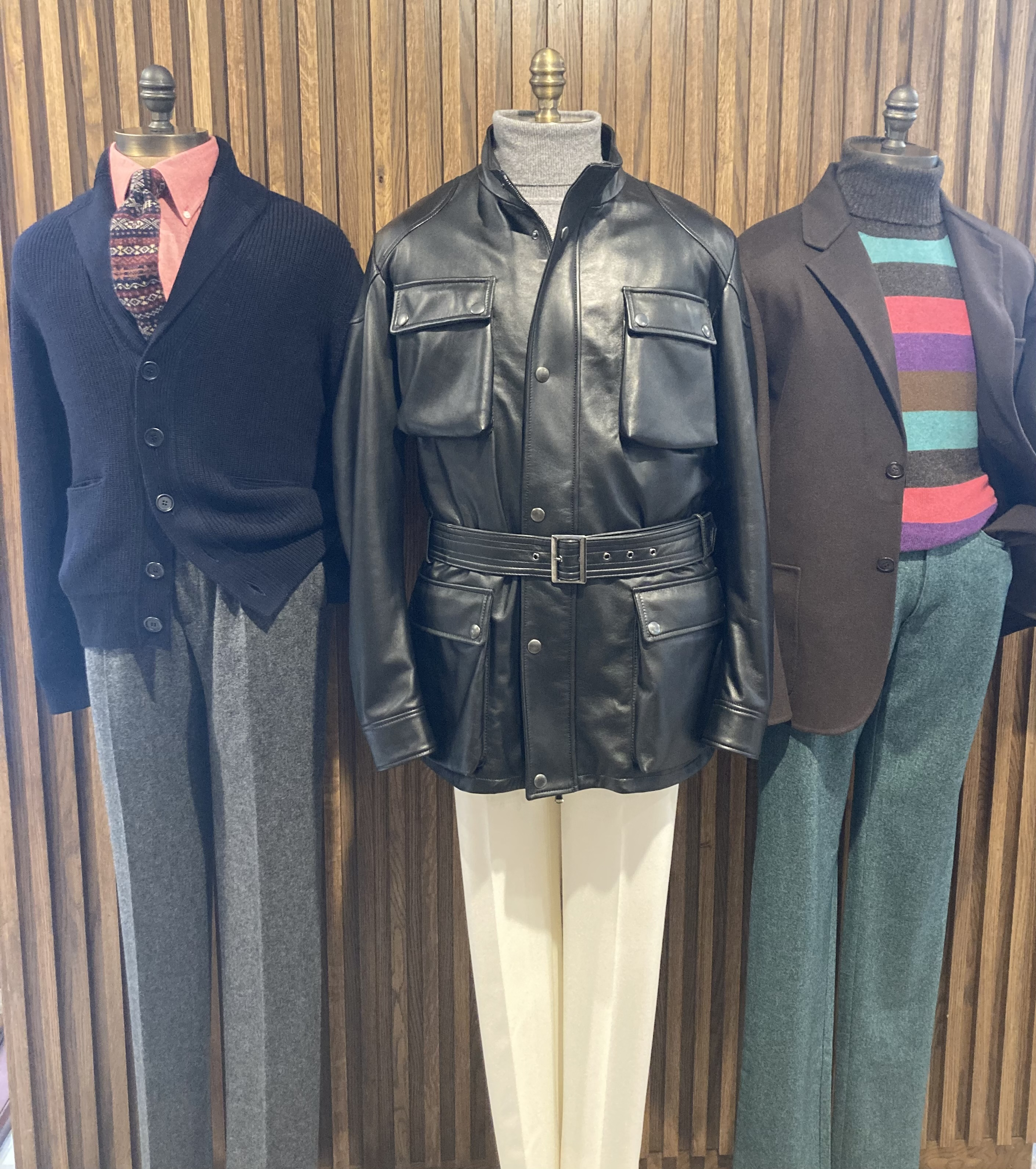
Fall/Winter 2024 garments displayed at Paul Stuart Michigan Avenue

Paul Stuart has standalone shops in New York City, Chicago, Washington DC, Southampton, New York, and Tokyo.

Since 1938, the original New York City flagship store has been located at the corner of Madison Avenue and 45th Street.

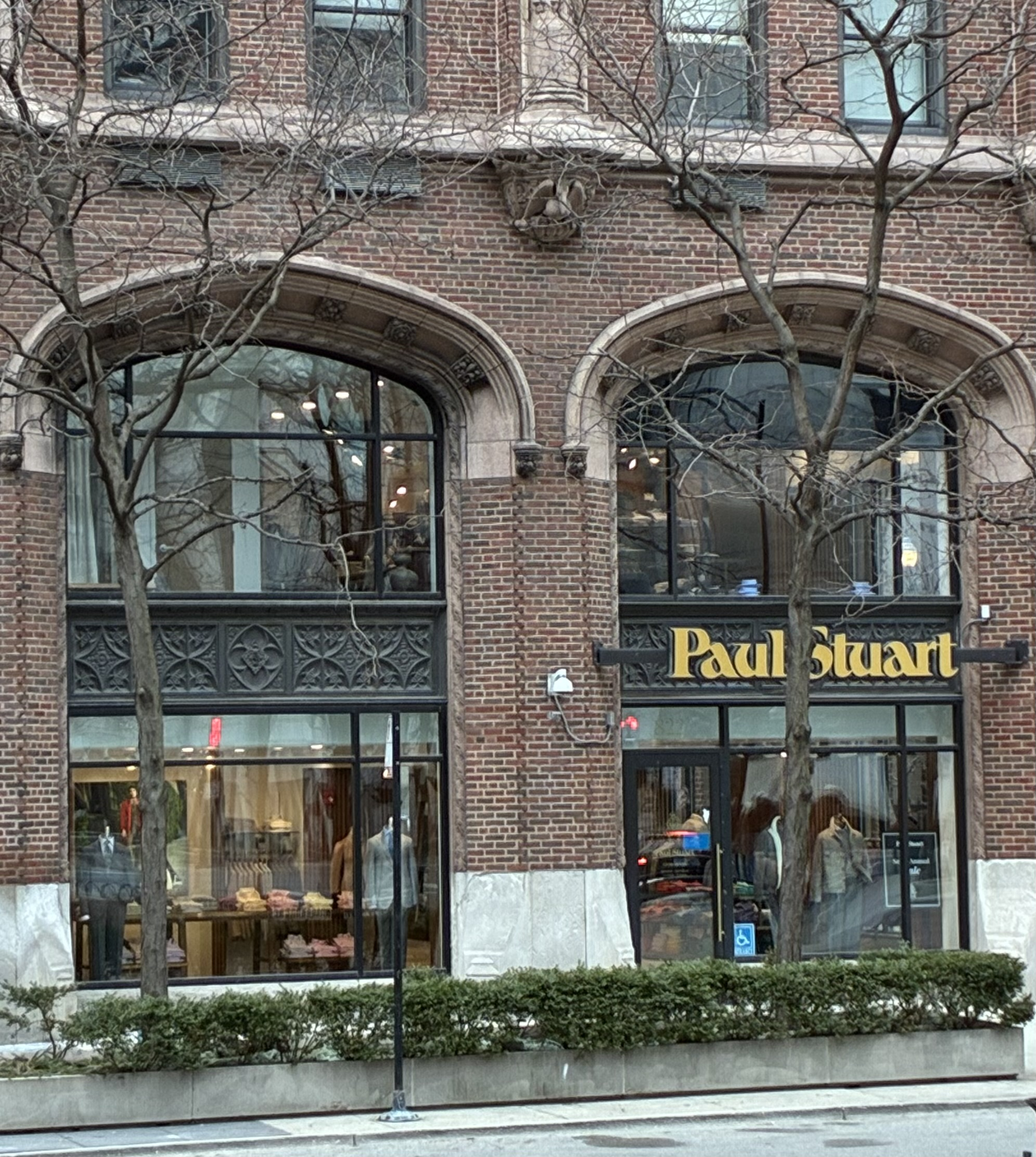
Paul Stuart boutique Michigan Avenue facade in winter

In the fall of 2008, Paul Stuart relocated its Chicago store from the John Hancock Center on Michigan Avenue to Oak Street. In the spring of 2011, Paul Stuart opened a second Chicago location in The Loop, at the corner of LaSalle Street and Adams Street in the historic Continental and Commercial National Bank building designed by Daniel Burnham, currently anchored by JW Marriott Hotels. Both Chicago stores were broken into and looted during the George Floyd protests in Chicago, and the Loop store in the JW Marriott was permanently closed. In 2024 the Oak Street store was relocated to a 5,250 sq ft space spanning two floors at 822 North Michigan Avenue in front of Chicago Water Tower, and opposite its original Hancock Tower location from decades prior.

The store in Washington, D.C. opened in spring 2015 in CityCenterDC.

Paul Stuart shoes and boots were sold at Bloomingdales and Saks Fifth Avenue.

On 1 September 2020, Paul Stuart opened a 846 ft^{2} popup store in New York City at 505 Broome Street which focused on the brand's CustomLab entry-level made-to-measure tailored clothing.

On July 1, 2020 the brand opened a shop in Southampton.

The Tokyo flagship store is located in Kita-Aoyama near Gaiemmae Station of the Ginza Line; the flagship store was previously located in Jingūmae on Omotesandō.

In Japan, Paul Stuart is sold at 80 shop-in-shop locations and nearly 500 corners in Japanese department stores including Daimaru, Keiō, Keisei, Isetan, Matsuya, Matsuzakaya, Mitsukoshi, Seibu, Sōgo, Takashimaya, Tōbu, Tōkyū, and others.

== Clientele ==
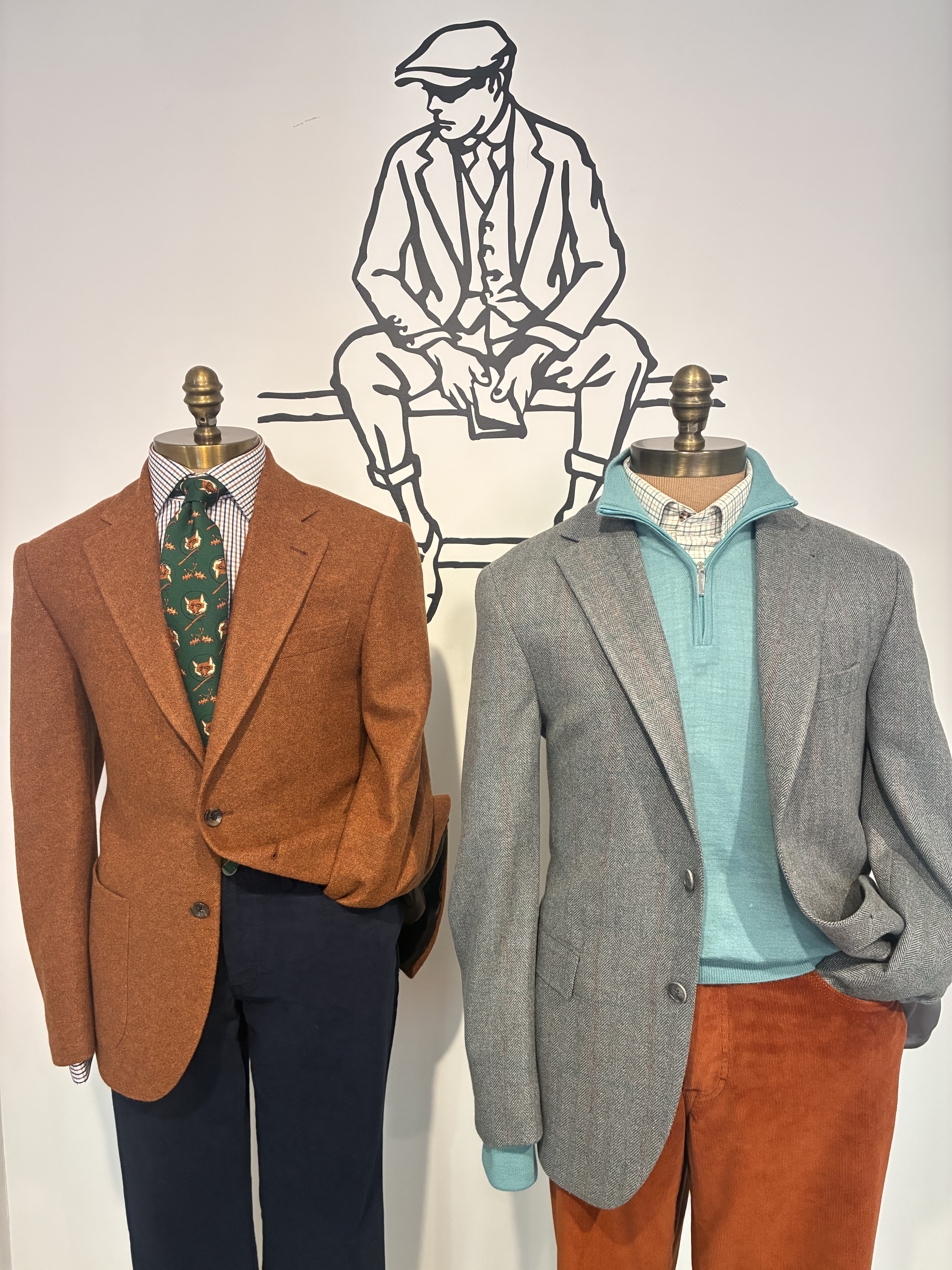
Paul Stuart mannequins dressed in F/W 2025 garments

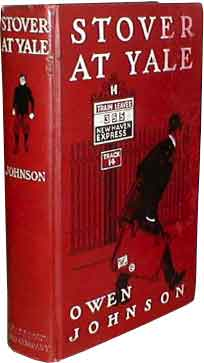
The protagonist of Stover at Yale by Owen Johnson is the inspiration behind the “man on the fence” logo of Paul Stuart

Ralph Lauren, Fred Astaire, Mel Brooks, Cary Grant, Paul Newman, Frank Sinatra, Michael Bloomberg, Miles Davis, Art Blakey, Ron Carter, and Billy Taylor have been customers of the brand.

Paul Stuart's style has been described as a blend of “Savile Row, Connecticut living and the concrete canyons of New York.” In its early years, Paul Stuart was known as "the poor man's Brooks Brothers"; later its prices rose, and for many years it has been more expensive than Brooks Brothers.

== In popular culture ==
Paul Stuart dressed Cary Grant in Hitchcock's North by Northwest. The brand was worn in Succession.

== See also ==
- Oxxford Clothes
- Brooks Brothers
- J. Press
- Hartmarx
- Hickey Freeman
- Allen Edmonds
- Alden Shoe Company
