= Balmacaan =

Loose overcoat

A balmacaan is a loose-fitting overcoat characterized by a small, rounded collar and raglan sleeves. Traditionally cut for ease of movement, it was originally made from heavy, coarse woolen cloth designed to withstand harsh weather.

It is named after an estate near Inverness, Scotland, on the western shore of Loch Ness, and is a single-breasted coat, often a raincoat. To decrease the risk of water penetrating the coat, the number of seams is reduced by bringing the sleeve to the collar rather than to the shoulder as usual. A balmacaan has raglan sleeves and a Prussian collar, and is usually made of tweed or gabardine.
