= Raglan sleeve =

Shirt sleeve attaching to the collar

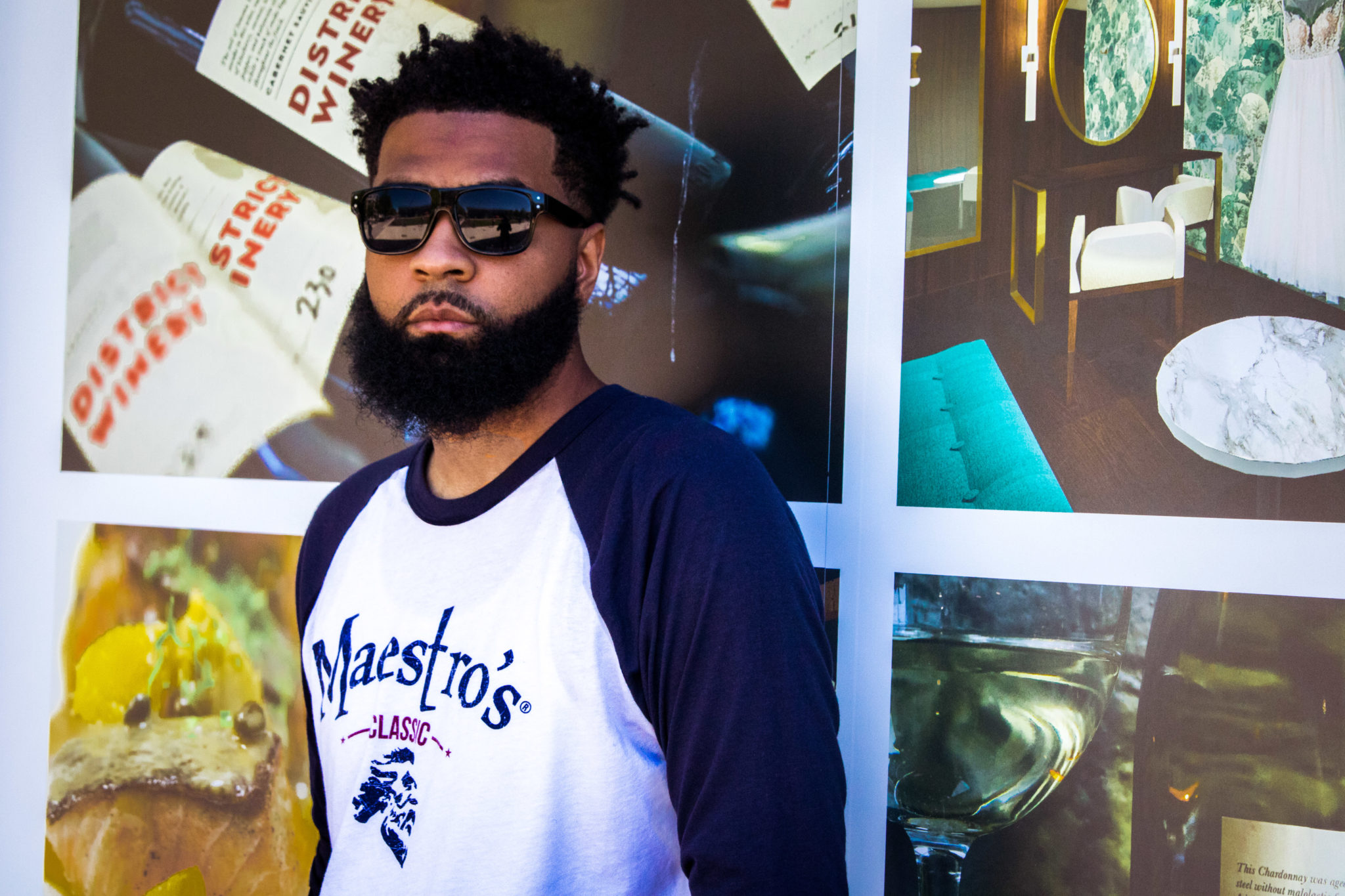
Man wearing a raglan sleeve shirt

A raglan sleeve is a sleeve that extends in one piece fully to the collar, leaving a diagonal seam from underarm to collarbone.

It is named after FitzRoy Somerset, 1st Baron Raglan, who is said to have worn a coat with this style of sleeve after the loss of his arm in the Battle of Waterloo.

The raglan mid-length sleeve is a popular undergarment (worn under the jersey) for baseball teams in MLB.

The ancient chiton was a tunic with a peplum waist line worn by men and women of ancient Greece and Rome that fastened at the shoulder in a way resembling a raglan sleeve.

== See also ==
- Chiton
- Clothing
- Peplos
- Shirt
- Sleeveless shirt
