= Charles Macintosh =

British chemist (1766–1843)

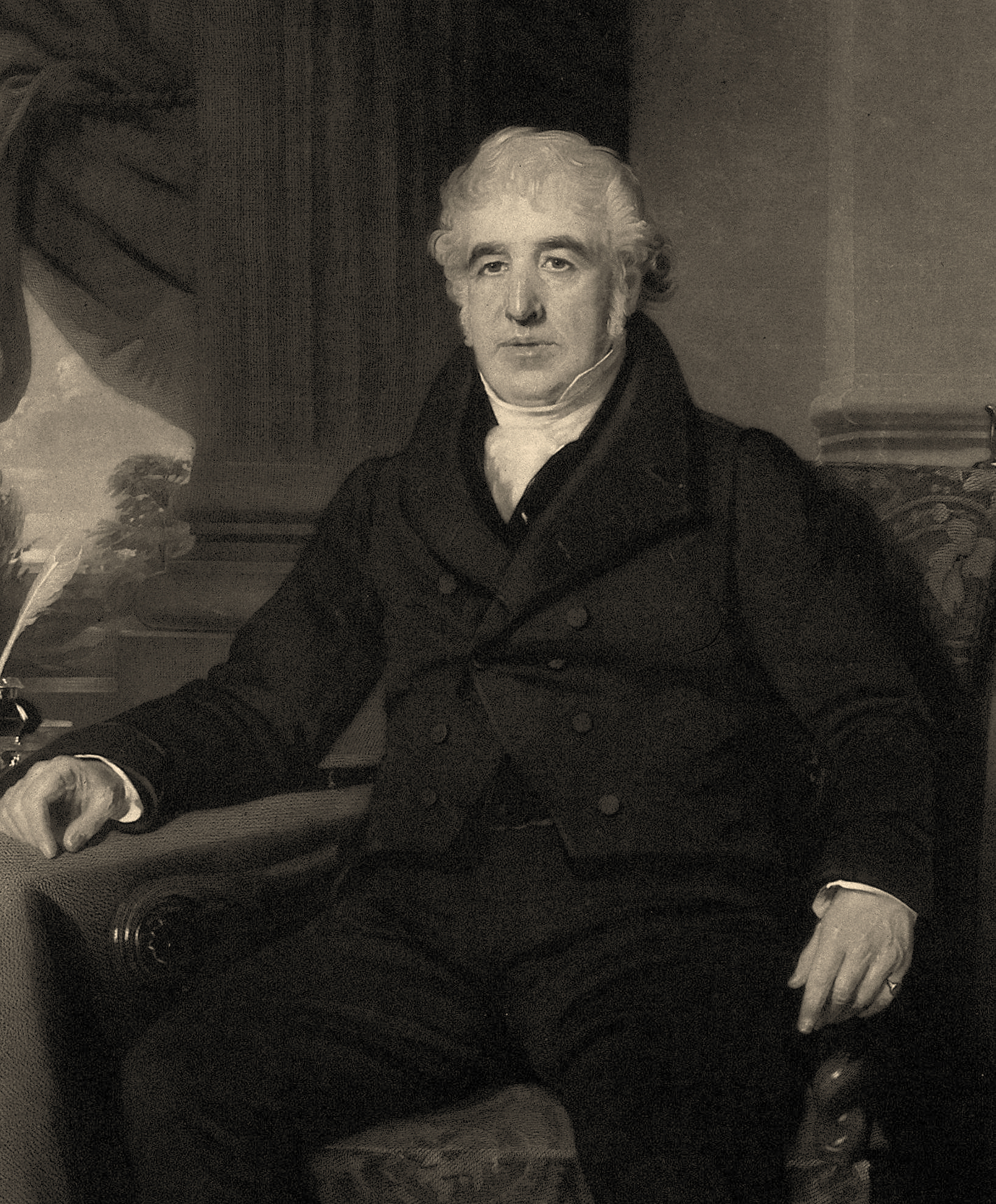
- Portrait of Macintosh by John Graham-Gilbert
- Born: 29 December 1766; Glasgow, Scotland
- Died: 25 July 1843 (aged 76); Glasgow, Scotland
- Education: University of Edinburgh
- Engineering career
- Significant advance: Invented the waterproof raincoat in 1824

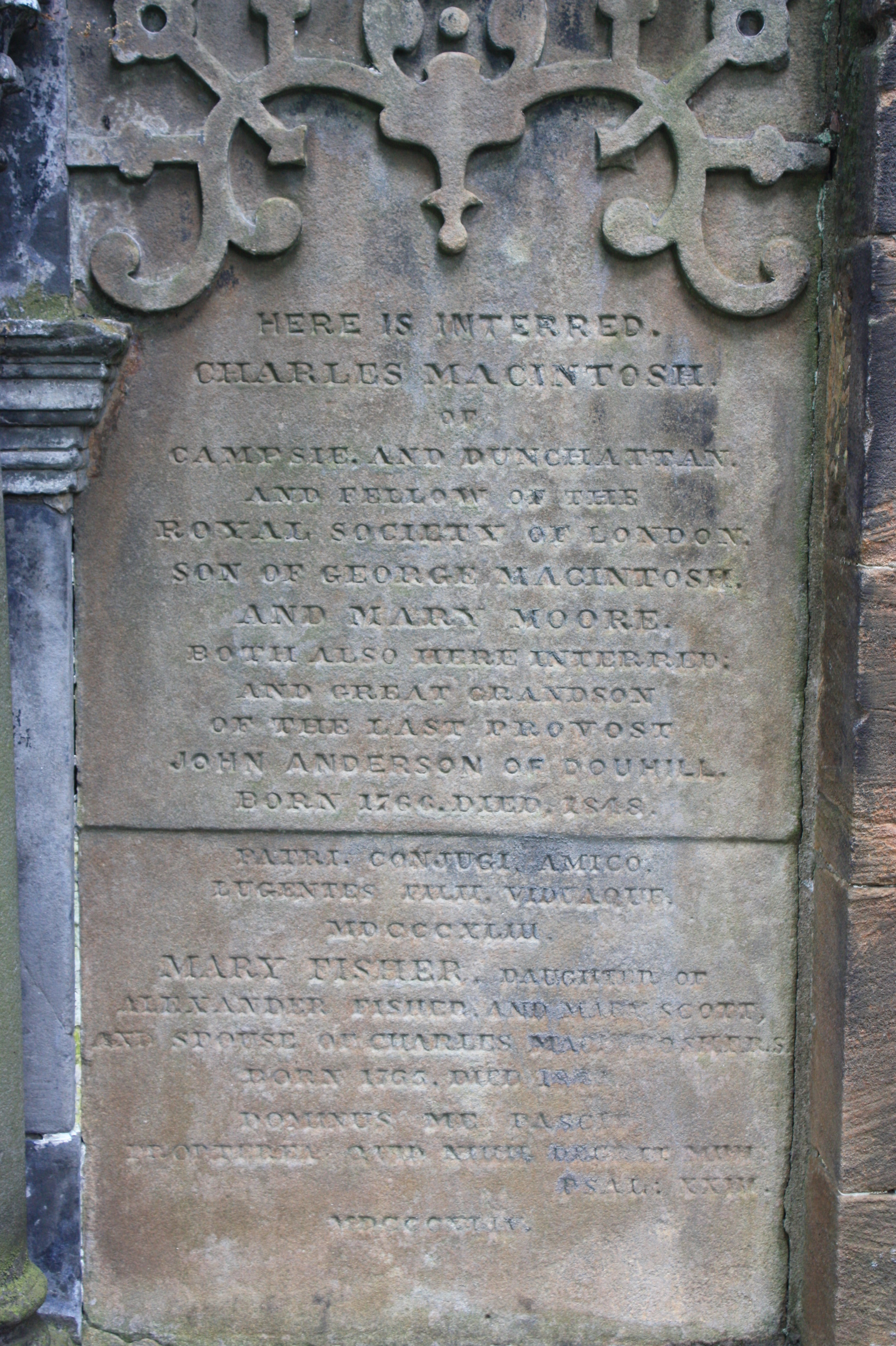
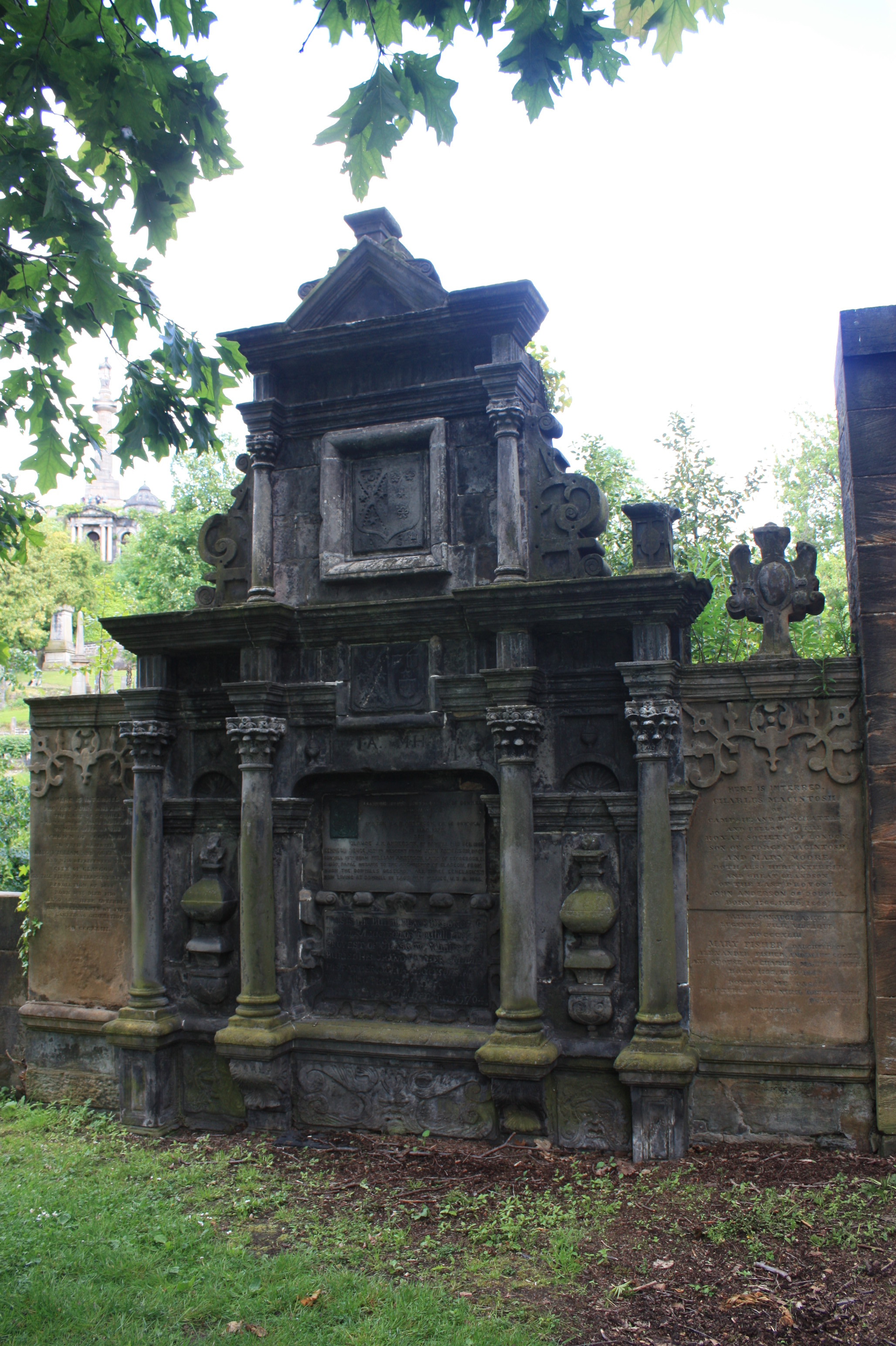
The grave of Charles Macintosh, Glasgow Cathedral (left). Provost Anderson's tomb, Glasgow Cathedral (right): Macintosh is listed on the right as his great grandson.

Charles Macintosh FRS (29 December 1766 – 25 July 1843) was a Scottish chemist and the inventor of the modern waterproof raincoat. The mackintosh raincoat (the variant spelling is now standard) is named after him.

== Biography ==
Macintosh was born in Glasgow, Scotland, the son of George Macintosh and Mary Moore, and was first employed as a clerk. Charles devoted his spare time to science, particularly chemistry, and before he was 20 resigned his clerkship to study under Joseph Black at the University of Edinburgh, and to take up the manufacture of chemicals. In this he was highly successful and invented various new processes. His experiments with naphtha led to his invention of waterproof rubberized fabric; the essence of his patent was the cementing of two thicknesses of cloth together with natural rubber. The rubber is made soluble by the action of the naphtha. The naphtha was prepared by distillation of coal tar, with the Bonnington Chemical Works being a major supplier.

Macintosh married Mary Fisher in 1790, daughter of Alexander Fisher, a Glasgow merchant. They had three sons, George Macintosh (1791–1848), Alexander Fisher Macintosh (1785–1868), Wallace Francis Macintosh (1799–1815), and one daughter, Mary Scott Macintosh (1792–1823),

In 1823, he was elected a fellow of the Royal Society for his chemical discoveries. In 1828, he became a partner with James Beaumont Neilson in a firm to exploit the latter's patent for the hot blast blowing of blast furnaces, which saved considerably on their fuel consumption.

Charles died in 1843 and was buried in the Glasgow Cathedral graveyard. He is buried with his parents in the ground of his great-grandfather, John Anderson of Douhill, Lord Provost of Glasgow. His name is added to the 17th century monument which stands against the eastern boundary wall. A late 19th century secondary memorial also exists, in polished red granite, slightly to the north, where Charles is again mentioned on the grave of his son, George.

== Legacy ==
On 29 December 2016, the search engine Google marked the 250th anniversary of the birth of the inventor of the modern raincoat with a Google doodle of Macintosh in the rain.
