= Waterproof fabric =

Textile that resists moisture penetration

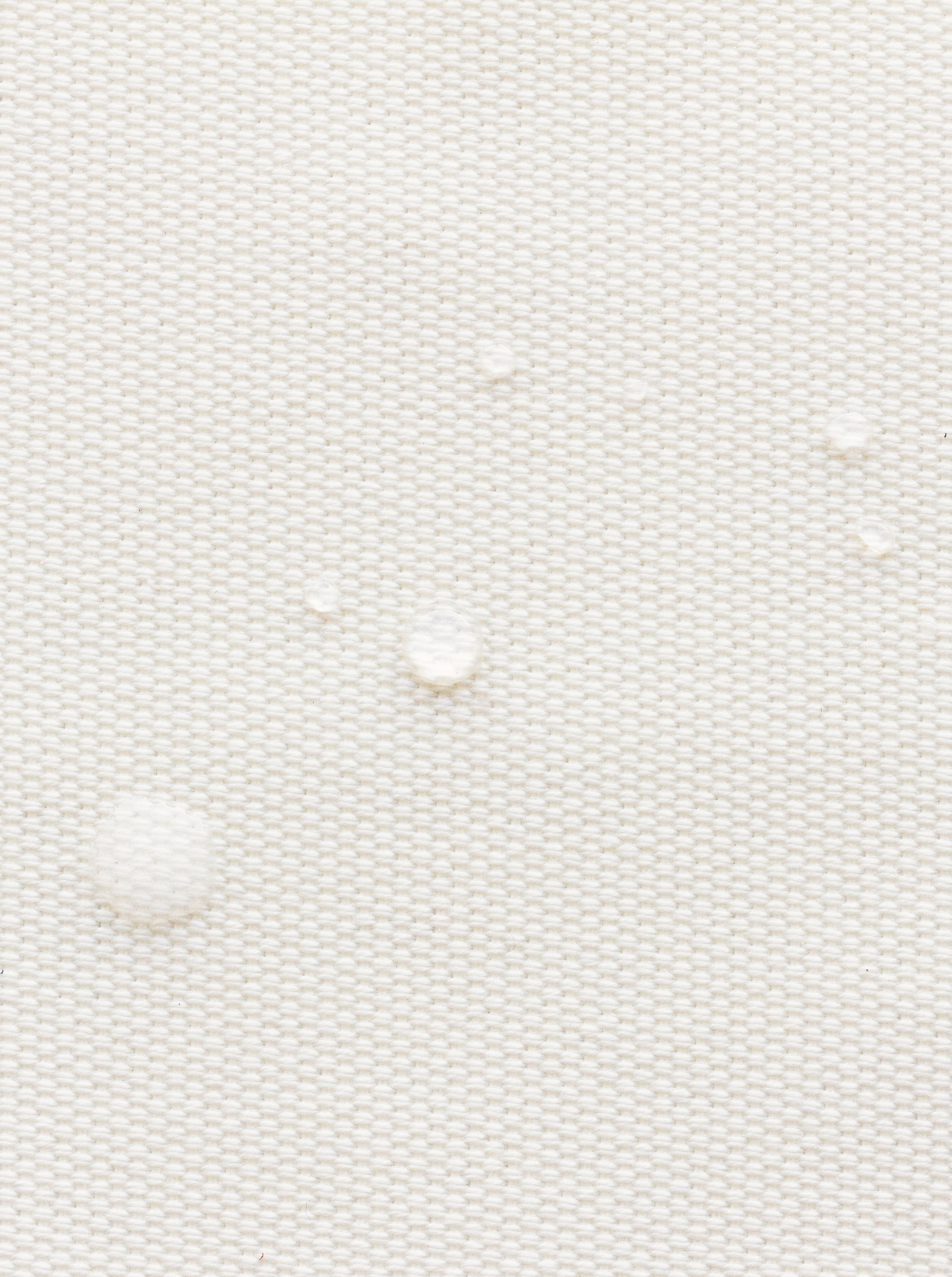
A wax coating makes this Manila hemp waterproof

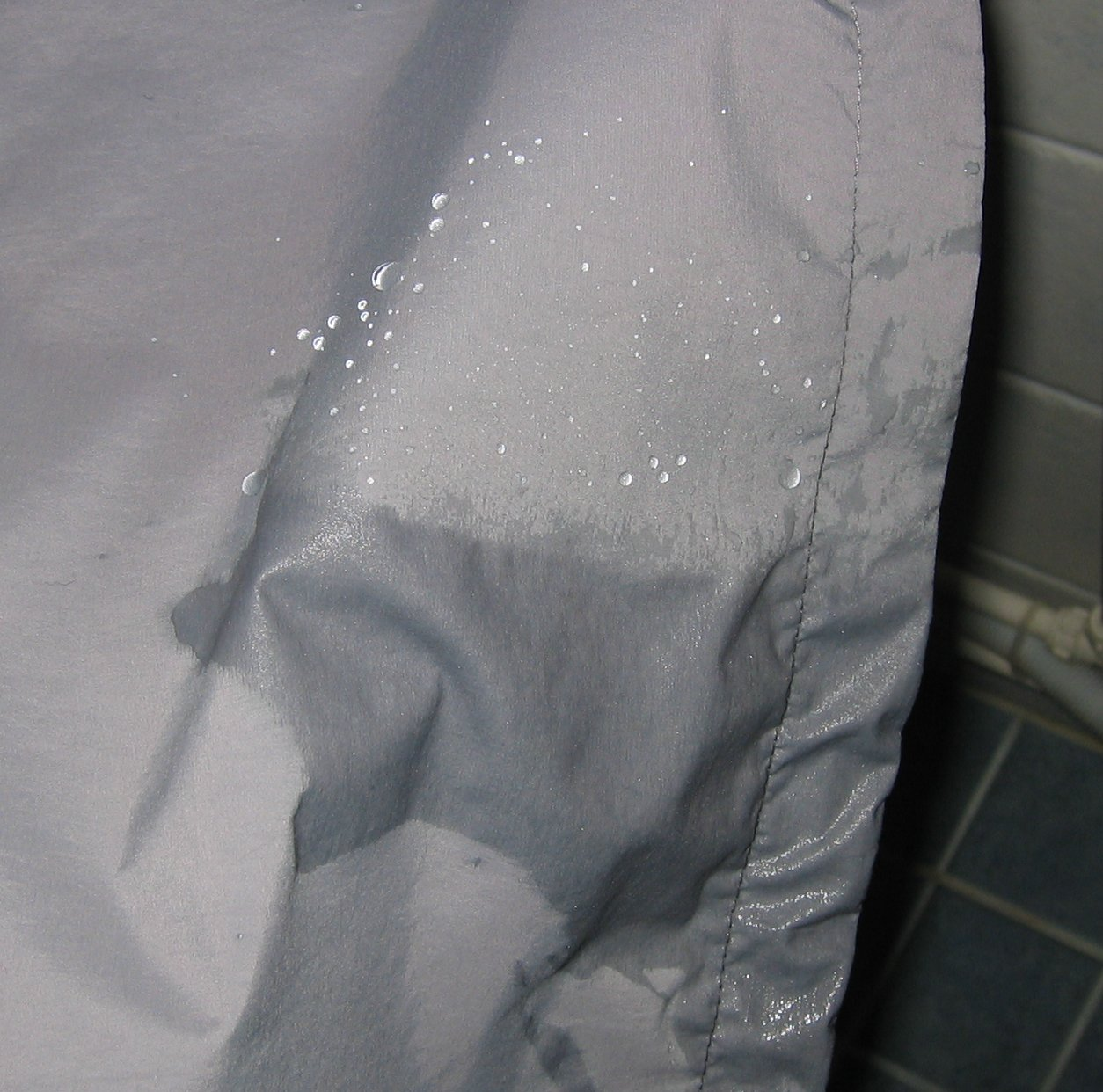
Effect of water repellent on a shell layer Gore-Tex jacket

Waterproof fabrics are fabrics that are inherently, or have been treated to become, resistant to penetration by water and wetting. The term "waterproof" refers to conformance to a governing specification and specific conditions of a laboratory test method. They are usually natural or synthetic fabrics that are laminated or coated with a waterproofing material such as wax, rubber, polyvinyl chloride (PVC), polyurethane (PU), silicone elastomer, or fluoropolymers. Treatment could be either of the fabric during manufacture or of completed products after manufacture, for instance by a waterproofing spray. Examples include the rubberized fabric used in Mackintosh jackets, sauna suits, and inflatable boats.

Waterproof fabrics may also include waterproof-breathable fabrics, which are fabrics that allow water vapor to move across the fabric while still resisting liquid water and wetting.

== Definition and specifications ==
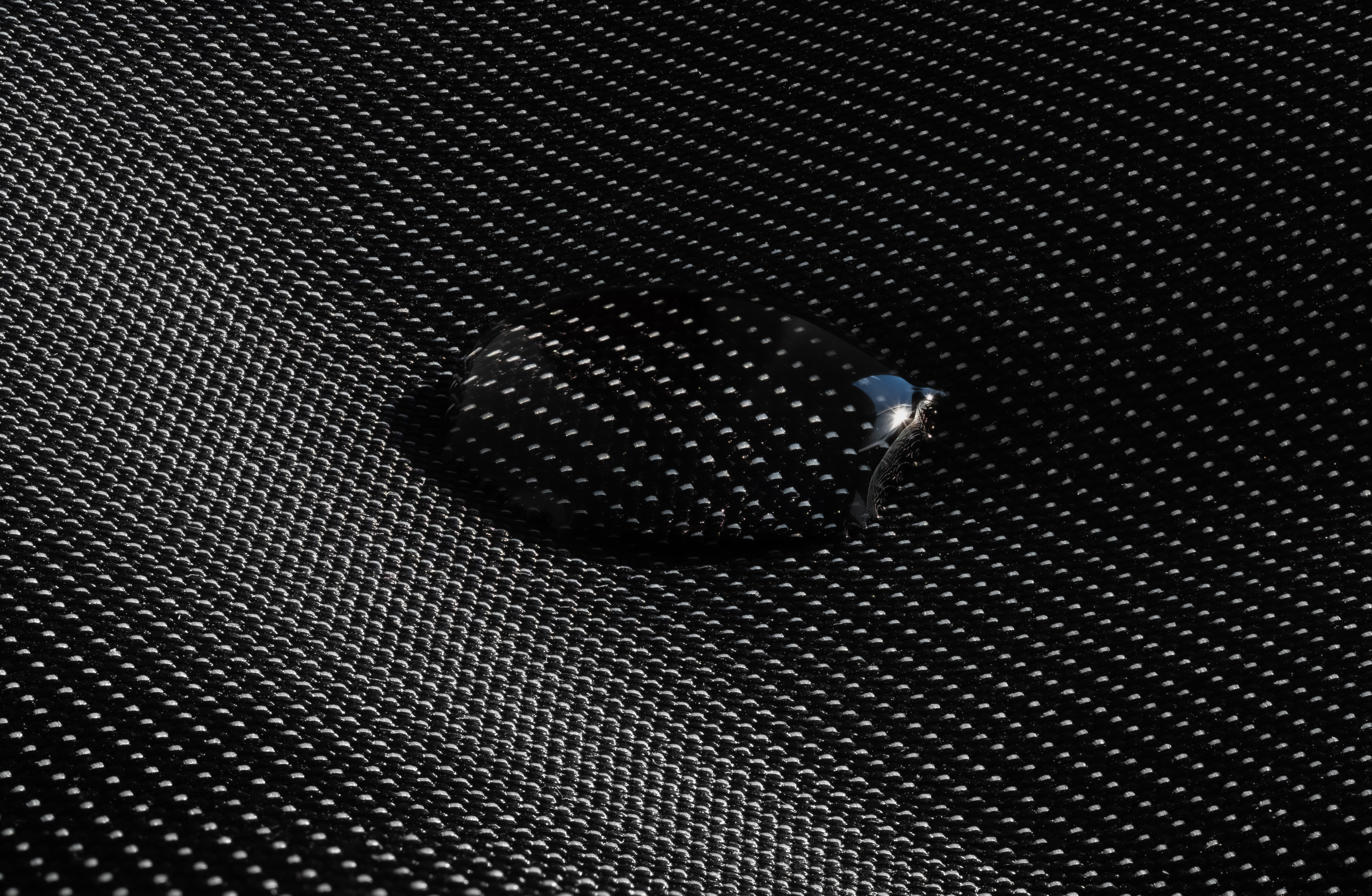
Drop of water on 100% polyester textile

Waterproof/breathable fabrics resist liquid water passing through, but allow water vapour to pass through. Their ability to block out rain and snow while allowing vapour from sweat to evaporate leads to their use in rainwear, waterproof outdoor sports clothing, tents, and other applications.

Standard laboratory testing protocols define the performance of these fabrics. Water resistance is measured by the amount of water, in mm, which can be suspended above the fabric before water seeps through. Breathability or moisture vapor transmission rate is measured by the rate at which water vapor passes through, in grams of water vapour per square meter of fabric per 24-hour period (g/m^{2}/d), often abbreviated to just "g". In recent years some, but not all, sporting goods manufacturers have begun including this information on their product labels. Typical mid-range fabrics tend to have values of 5,000 mm of water resistance and 5,000 g of breathability; the best materials have 20,000 mm and 20,000 g.

One specific definition of "waterproof/breathable" requires the fabric to withstand a pressure of over 1,000 millimetres of water (9.8 kPa) pressure without leaking (see hydrostatic head).

These values should be taken with some caveats. Rain room tests show that some fabrics with less than 1,000 mm of water resistance keep water out sufficiently for practical purposes. Garments made from these fabrics tested in the Leeds University Rain Room show no signs of leakage after 4 hours of simulated rain five times heavier than heavy rain. However, some garments made from fabrics that exceed 20 000 mm have leaked through zips, hoods, and seams. Fabric head ratings do not totally specify water resistance of a garment, as it does not test closures such as zips. In addition, the breathability of nearly all waterproof/breathable fabrics is very dependent upon weather conditions, especially temperature, humidity, and wind.

== Types ==
=== Waterproof ===
Fabrics such as cotton or nylon may be coated with various compounds such as wax, silicone, or polyurethane to confer waterproof properties. The resulting fabrics (i.e. waxed cotton and silnylon) are fully waterproof but are not considered breathable as the coating creates a fabric that blocks both liquid water and water vapor from moving across the fabric.

=== Waterproof-breathable ===
==== Woven ====
Woven waterproof-breathable fabrics are made from fibers that are woven at such a high density that water is unable to pass through the pores of the fabric, either at all times or, in the case of textiles made from hygroscopic fibers like Ventile, after the fabric has been exposed to water. In contrast to other waterproof-breathable textiles, these fabrics do not use a membrane or coatings to achieve waterproofing.

==== Polyurethane laminate ====
Polyurethane laminate (PUL) textiles are composites that consists of a fabric such as polyester laminated to a thin film of polyurethane to provide waterproofing.

==== Membrane-based fabrics ====
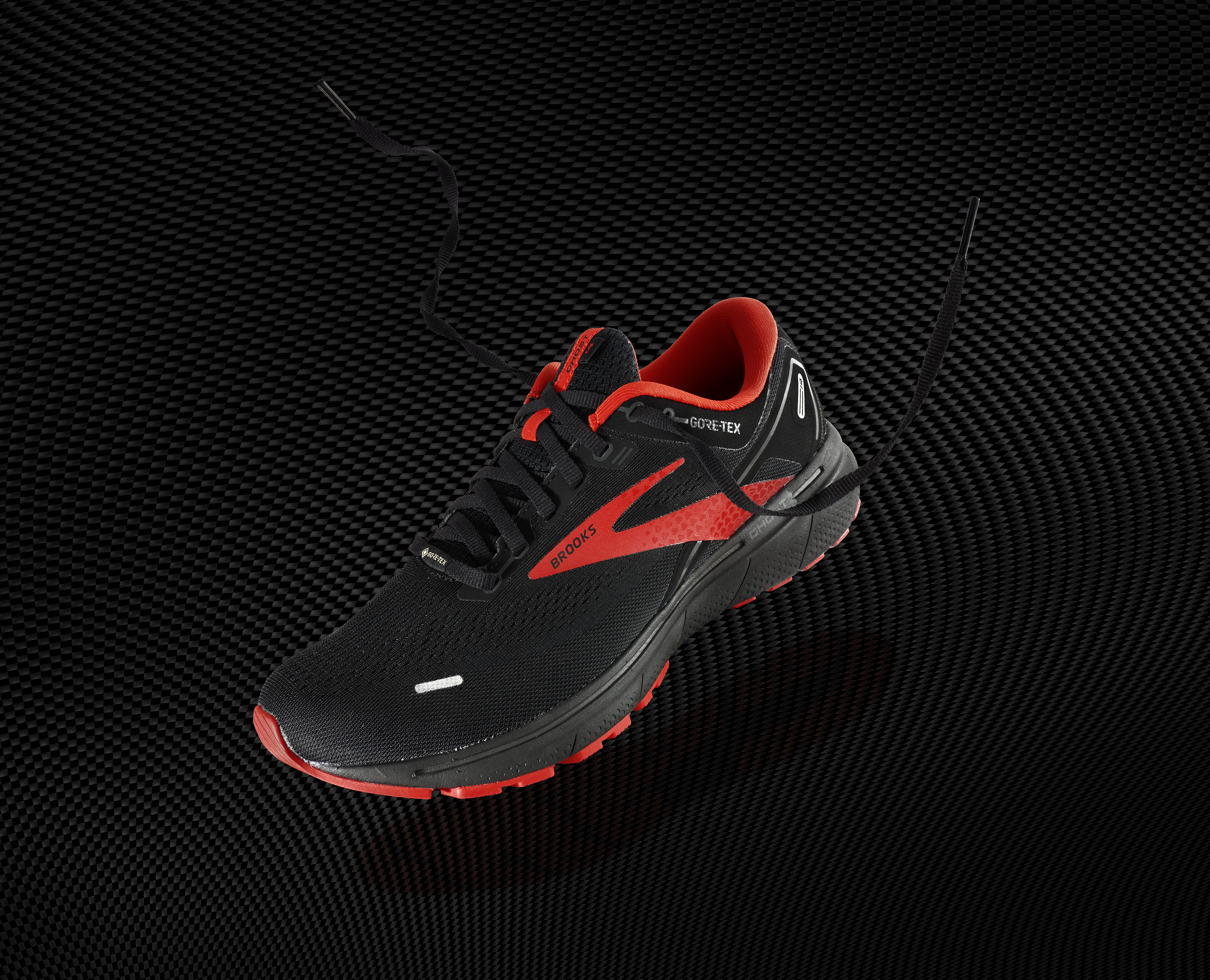
A membrane fabric makes this shoe waterproof.

Membrane-based waterproof/breathable fabrics use an ePTFE or PVDF membrane that has pores that are large enough to allow water vapor to pass through, but small enough that rain droplets and other precipitation cannot. The membrane is laminated between an outer fabric like ripstop nylon and an inner liner, typically either a fabric liner or a polyurethane coating. Both layers provide structure to the membrane and protect it from physical damage and contamination.

In sportswear applications, the outer liner fabric may also be coated with a durable water repellent. The durable water repellent coating must be maintained on a regular basis to prevent a phenomenon known as "wetting out", wherein the outer protective layer becomes saturated and prevents the movement of water vapor.

== Applications ==
=== Apparel ===
Waterproof/breathable fabrics are commonly used in rainwear, ski suits, cycling kits, and other types of outerwear, where the fabric is used in a garment that is intended to maintain the wearer's comfort. Apparel applications will typically use membrane-based waterproof/breathable fabrics, such as Gore-Tex.

=== Other applications ===
Polyurethane laminates are often used in household applications such as waterproof mattress protectors where they provide a more comfortable alternative to vinyl mattress covers.

Polyurethane laminates are also used as materials for cloth diapers, where the polyurethane layer is used to contain fluids within the diaper.

== See also ==
- Durable water repellent
- Gore-Tex
- Layered clothing
- Sauna suit
- Ventile
- Waterproofing
