= British Millerain =

British textile manufacturer

The British Millerain Company Limited
- Trade name: British Millerain
- Type: Private
- Industry: Textiles
- Founded: 1880
- Founder: John Miller
- Headquarters: Rochdale
- Key people: James Keeble (Managing Director)
- Products: Textiles
- Website: www.britishmillerain.com

British Millerain is a British textile manufacturer specialising in waxed cotton, founded in 1880.

== History ==
The British Millerain Company Limited was established in Halifax, in 1880, in order to acquire inventions and letters patent granted to John Miller and his son, John Miller Jnr, for 'improvements in the method of and apparatus for rendering textile fabrics waterproof by one treatment or process'.

It was the first company to supply waxed cotton to British countrywear and motorcycle brands.

In 1897, the company supplied 30,000 blankets to the United States Armed Forces.

In 1987, it acquired Francis Webster, the spinners and weavers.

Today, the company operates from a factory in Rochdale, Greater Manchester, and is run by the eighth generation of the Miller family.

== Collaborations and customers ==
British Millerain is a supplier to British clothing brands, Barbour and Belstaff, recognised for their waxed cotton jackets and coats.

The company has also collaborated with a number of designers and outlets including:

- Dr. Martens, in 2011 for their fall/winter collection.
- Norse Projects, in 2019, for two jackets and caps as part of its fall collection
- North Face, in 2020, and 2026, for jackets and t-shirts.
- Ralph Lauren, in 2023, in its fall collection. The jacket was worn by Taylor Swift and featured on the front cover of the New York Times.
