= Waxed cotton =

Sturdy fabric waterproofed with wax

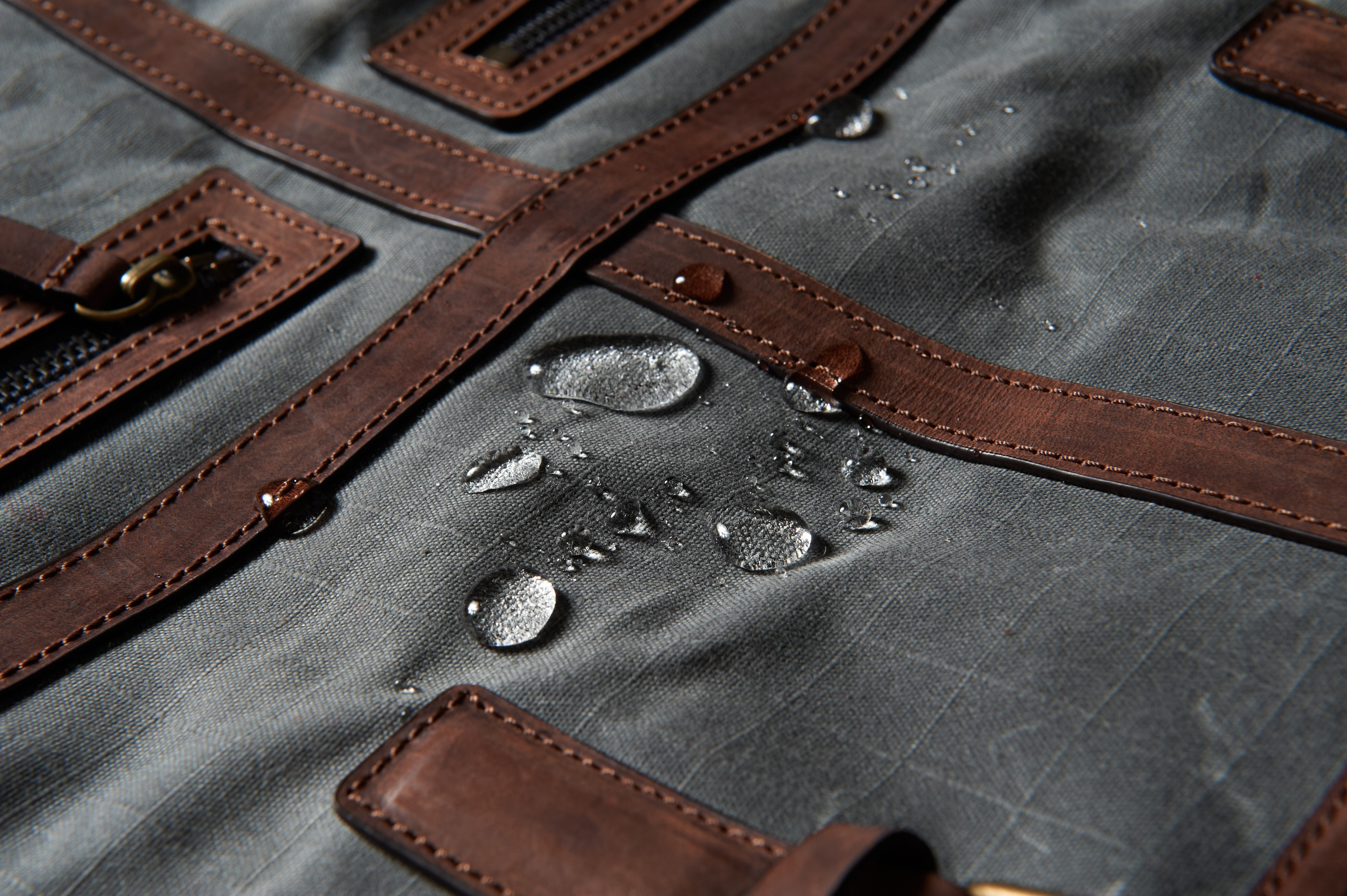
Close-up of American Martexin waxed canvas demonstrating water repellency.

Waxed cotton is cotton impregnated with a paraffin or natural beeswax-based wax, woven into or applied to the cloth. Popular from the 1920s to the mid-1950s, the product, which developed from the sailing industry in England and Scotland, became commonly used for waterproofing. It has been replaced by more modern materials but is still used by the country sports community. There are two main drawbacks: waxed fabric is not very breathable, and it tends to be heavier and bulkier than modern synthetic waterproof materials.

== Background ==
Early mariners noticed that wet sails were more efficient than dry sails, but their added weight slowed the vessels. From the 15th century, mariners applied fish oils and grease to their heavy sailcloth. This resulted in more efficient sails in dry weather and lighter sails in wet weather. Out of the worn remnants they cut waterproof capes to keep themselves dry; these capes were the forerunner of the fisherman's slicker.

From 1795, Arbroath-based sail maker Francis Webster Ltd had perfected the art of adding linseed oil to flax sails, creating an oiled flax. Lighter than wet sailcloth, the treatment was used by the Royal Navy and the early tea clippers. As the tea race competition increased, the clipper designers and captains looked for more weight reduction. The clippers were often used to ship cotton from Egypt, so they tried this lighter material.

== Development ==
The first Egyptian cotton products with linseed oil applied started to appear from the mid-1850s. Tea clipper sails were made from strong two-ply yarns in both warp and weft, which provided lighter cloth with extra strength for the larger sails. The recipe for coating each cloth remained unique to that cloth, but all cloths suffered the same problems: stiffness in the cold; and a tendency to turn a shade of yellow towards that of pure linseed oil (this contributed to the yellow colour of early fisherman's clothing).

In the mid-1920s, three companies co-operated to create paraffin-impregnated cotton, which produced a highly water resistant cloth, breathable, but without the stiffness in the cold or yellowing with age. Woven by Webster's, it was taken to Lancashire for dyeing (black or olive green), and then to London for cupro-ammonia treatment. The cloth was then returned to Lancashire for waxing, and then back to Webster's for storage, sales and distribution.

Webster's were cautious about disrupting their home market, and so sent the new product to another part of the British Empire with similar climatic conditions and a love of sailing for testing: New Zealand. Given the local name Japara, as the material proved a weather and sales success, it was adopted as the trademark by Webster's.

In 2005 a new technology, refined hydrocarbon wax, was developed to replace cupro–ammonia treatment and remove the smell. Current United Kingdom manufacturers include British Millerain Co. Ltd., Halley Stevensons Limited, and Templemoyle Mills.

British Millerain were the first to wax cotton in the UK and export this specialist textile across the globe. Halley Stevensons began as a manufacturer of textiles for upholstery, curtains and furnishing, and added waxed cotton to their range in the 1990s. More recently, Templemoyle Mills was established and began manufacturing waxed cotton in Ireland; the company registered in 2013.

In the United States, Martin Dyeing and Finishing Co. began producing the Martexin Original Wax brand in the 1930s, expanding the manufacturing of waxed cotton canvas outside of Europe.

In 1968, Swedish company Fjällräven began producing their G-1000 fabric after research based on the military and expeditionary experiences of the founder, Åke Nordin. G-1000 is still a key material in many of their outdoor products in 2023, although the modern fabric incorporates more environmental design factors. It is a cotton-polyester blend impregnated with their own odourless beeswax-paraffin recipe sold as "Greenland Wax". The wax washes out of the fabric after around 2-3 wash cycles. Roughly the size of a typical bar of soap, the Greenland wax blocks are rubbed on the garment and the traces of wax are then melted into the fabric using an iron or hairdryer. This allows the customer to easily restore the water and wind resistance of the garment as needed.

== Use ==
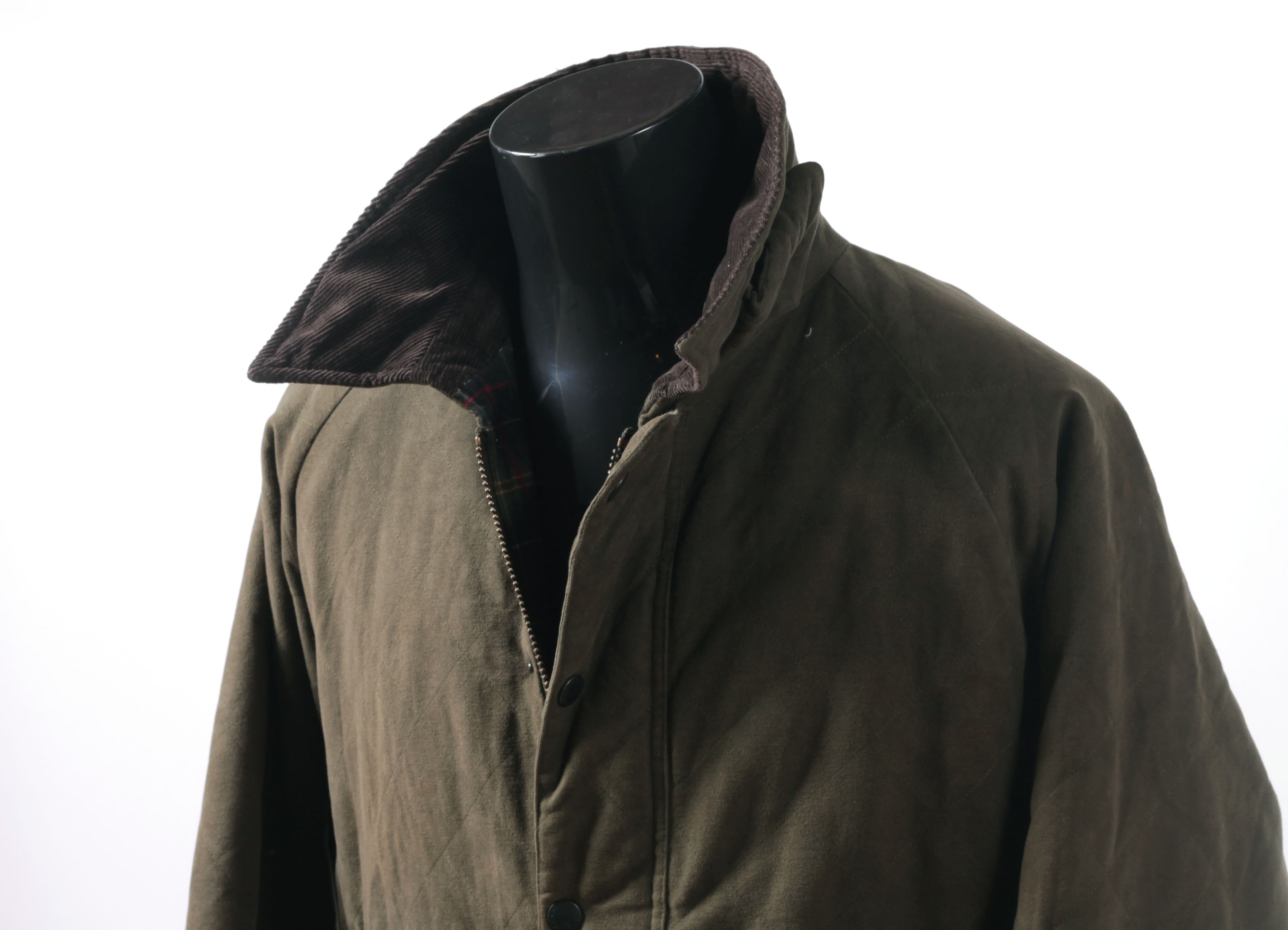
A men's waxed cotton Barbour jacket in green.

Waxed cotton became an instant success with the commercial shipping industry, and Webster's as the primary manufacturer looked for alternative markets. One early adopter was J. Barbour & Sons in the outdoor industry, producing waxed jackets for farmers and gamekeepers. As motorcycling emerged as personal transport, the new company Belstaff also developed clothing.

Waxed cotton came in either black, or an inconsistent dark olive. Colour was controlled by the amount of copper left from the cupro-ammonia treatment, and because of variability of the olive a complementary dark brown corduroy collar was placed on dark olive jackets.

Barbour's entered the motorcycling market from the early 1930s, with the Barbour International motorcycle suit, developing their market presence through sponsorship of the British competitions and teams in motorcycle trials. Barbour International suits were worn by virtually every British International team from 1936 to 1977, and in the 1964 International Six Days Trial, actor Steve McQueen and the rest of the American team.

Adopted as the first choice waterproof clothing for the British armed forces during World War II, uses of waxed cotton escalated in the late 1940s and 1950s as spare material and army-surplus was liquidated.

Rubber was normal waterproofing during the nineteenth century and although not breathable was highly versatile and widely used. In 1823 Charles Macintosh patented a double textured fabric sandwiched around a layer of rubber. The Mackintosh became the synonym for the rain coat. Improved Macintosh was extremely versatile and was developed for fashionable wear and sporting activity and was made by numerous Manchester manufacturers. Other waterproof and wind proof fabrics, such as Burberry, Grenfell and Ventile were developed from the late nineteenth century. By the early 1960s wartime-developed materials including nylon and polyvinyl chloride (PVC) had come to the commercial market in volume. The development of synthetic polymers began in the 1920s, gathering pace during and after the Second World War, though it took time for light, breathable waterproofing to be developed.

...Although the popularity of waxed cotton has decreased considerably, there remain various forms of waxed cotton with differences in look, touch and performance. Modern uses of waxed cotton have consolidated to a niche where its warmth provides a benefit over its cost, weight and maintenance disadvantages. In addition to apparel brands like Barbour and Belstaff, heavy-duty waxed canvas is widely utilized by bag manufacturers such as Filson and Builford. These brands use traditional waxed fabrics (including Halley Stevensons and Martexin) to produce briefcases for daily commutes, backpacks, and rugged luggage tailored for bushcraft and motorcycling. A notable physical characteristic of the material is that as the wax coating ages and undergoes friction, it naturally develops a visible patina and light-colored crease marks, commonly referred to as "chalk marks".

== Maintenance ==
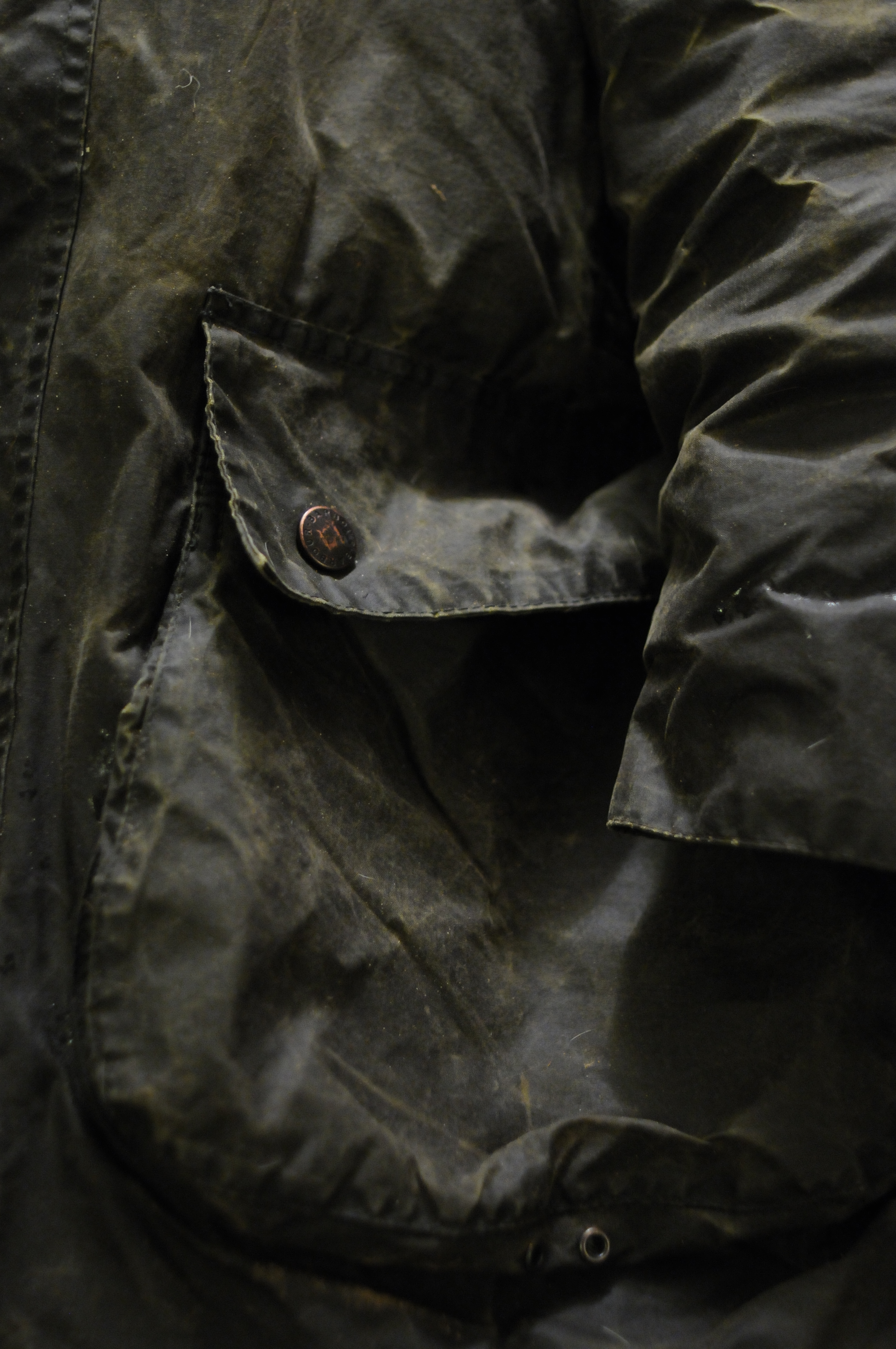
The pocket of a green Barbour jacket showing wear

Wax and cotton are natural products that degrade and lose effectiveness over time. To help preserve them, waxed cotton products should not be stored damp, but slowly dried instead. Waxed cotton typically needs annual re-waxing. Because methods of waxing differ between manufacturers, rewaxing products from the original manufacturer are recommended. Rewaxing is best undertaken in the summer, when the material is naturally at a warmer temperature. Then, in small sections, wax is warmed, placed on the material, and rubbed into it with a soft cloth. Once fully applied, the material should be gently warmed to allow the wax to penetrate and evenly cover it.

== See also ==
- Eisengarn – Strong, waxed cotton yarn
- Oilcloth – Type of cloth with a waterproof coating
- Oilskin – Waterproof garment made from treated sailcloth or canvas
- Waxed jacket – Hip-length raincoat made from waxed cotton cloth
- Beeswax wrap – Food wrap material using coated cotton
