= Sou'wester =

Waterproof hat with wide, slanting brim

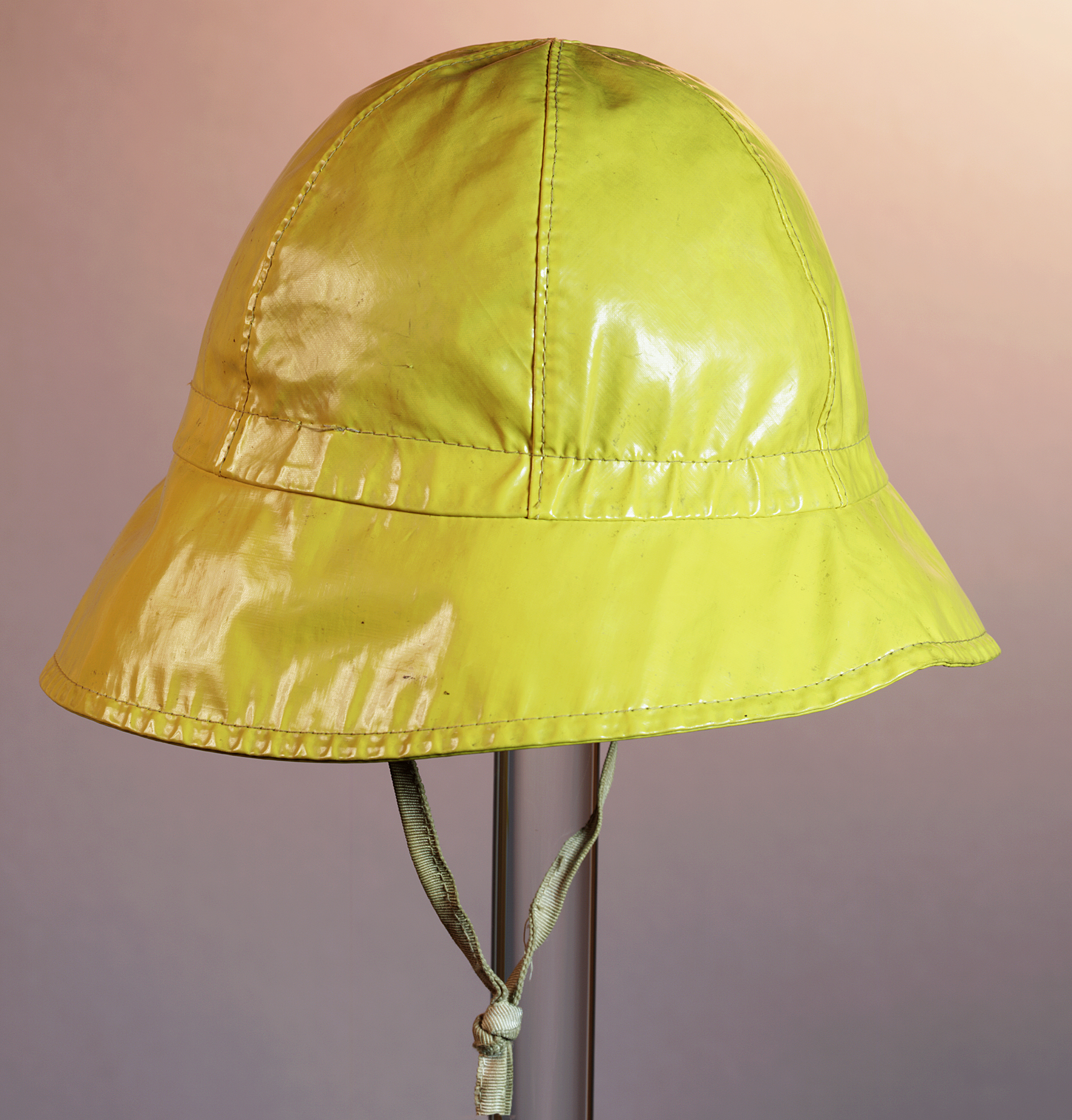
A sou'wester

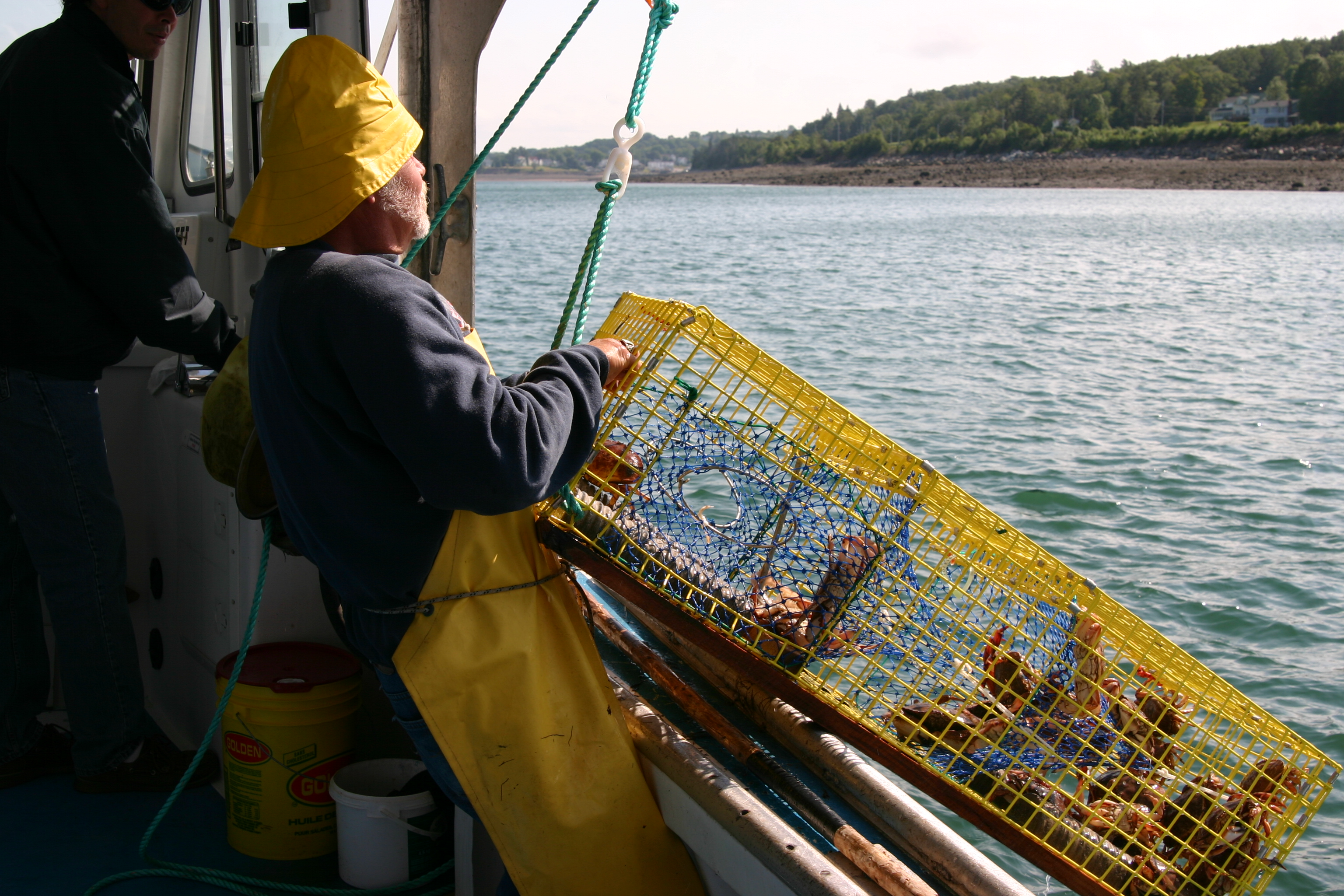
A crab fisherman wearing a sou'wester

A sou'wester is a traditional form of collapsible oilskin rain hat that is longer in the back than the front to protect the neck fully. A gutter front brim is sometimes featured.

The name is thought to come from the southwesterly wind which brings warm air from the tropics to the British Isles, often bringing rain as it cools over the sea.

== See also ==
- List of hat styles
- Mariner's cap
- Murder of Jean Bradley
- Oilcloth
- Waxed cotton
