= Patsy O'Connell Sherman =

American chemist (1930-2008)

Patsy Sherman
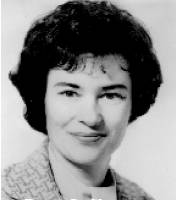
- Born: September 15, 1930
- Died: February 11, 2008 (aged 77)
- Occupation: Inventor
- Known for: Scotchgard
- Awards: National Inventors Hall of Fame

Patsy O’Connell Sherman (September 15, 1930– February 11, 2008) was an American chemist and co-inventor of Scotchgard, a 3M brand of products, a stain repellent and durable water repellent.

== Early life ==
Patsy O'Connell Sherman was born in Minneapolis, Minnesota. She grew up in an era where women were not permitted to higher levels of education, but despite this, her father encouraged her to pursue it. Her father was also very passionate about science his entire life, and that encouraged her even more. During this time, men were overseas fighting in the World War while women were expected to pick up the slack, giving them freedom and independence, which she heavily used. She attended Minneapolis North High School, where she did the men's aptitude test as the woman just told her housewife, and she wasn't happy with that. Shadowing her father, she chose to pursue a career in finance and graduated from Gustavus Adolphus College as a chemistry and math major - she was the first ever to do so. [1]

== Career ==
=== At 3M ===
In 1952, Sherman started her career at 3M. With Samuel Smith, Sherman co-invented Scotchgard, which soon become one of the most famous and widely used stain repellent and soil removal products in North America. The invention of Scotchgard was sparked by an accident. Sherman and coworkers were initially assigned to develop a rubber that could be used for jet fuel hoses. A sample of a fluorochemical rubber was accidentally spilled on an assistant's shoe. After exhaustive attempts to remove the rubber failed, Sherman realized that the material could be used as a repellant for oil, water, and other solvents. Sherman and Smith received a patent in 1971 for the "invention of block and graft copolymers containing water-solvatable polar groups and fluoroaliphatic groups." Sherman holds 13 patents with Smith in fluorochemical polymers and polymerization processes.

In 1974, Sherman was the first woman to be named to the Carlton Society, 3M's Hall of Fame ("for her surface energy research leading to the development of the 3M™ Scotchgard™ Fabric Protectant, and for her research in fluorochemical polymerization and synthesis of polymers"). Sherman remained at 3M for several years, improving and expanding the Scotchgard line of products. She later became a laboratory manager and, in the mid-1980s, she developed the company's technical education department.

In October 2002, along with notable speakers such as Steve Wozniak (the inventor of the Apple computer), Sherman spoke at the 200th anniversary celebration of the United States Patent and Trademark Office. She was one of 37 inventors who spoke on the process of invention. She said

You can encourage and teach young people to observe, to ask questions when unexpected things happen. You can teach yourself not to ignore the unanticipated. Just think of all the great inventions that have come through serendipity, such as Alexander Fleming's discovery of penicillin, and just noticing something no one conceived of before.

=== Advocating for women in science ===
Sherman was an outspoken advocate for women in science. "Girls should follow their dreams," she said. "They can do anything anybody else can do. They have many more role models today -- not the least of whom might be their mothers."

During development of the Scotchgard product in the 1950s, Sherman was required to wait for performance results outside of the textile mill during testing due to a rule at that time that banned women from the mill. At that time, there were very few female chemists; Sherman was a rarity in the corporate environment.

== Recognition ==
- Inducted into the Minnesota Science & Technology Hall of Fame (2011).
- Inducted into the National Inventors Hall of Fame (2001) and served on the board of directors.
- Joseph M. Biedenbach Distinguished Service Award from the American Society for Engineering Education (1991).
- Distinguished Alumni Citation Recipient for Scientific Research (1975).
- First woman inducted into the Carlton Society, 3M's Hall of Fame

== Personal life ==
Sherman retired from 3M in 1992, garnering further external recognition. Following a December 2007 stroke, she died February 11, 2008. Her husband Hubert Sherman had died in 1996, while her two surviving daughters were Shari Loushin (also a 3M chemist) and Wendy Heil, who owned Advanced Optics, Inc.

== See also ==
- List of female scientists
- Busch-Vishniac, Ilene; Busch, Lauren; Tietjen, Jill (2024). "Chapter 23. Patsy O. Sherman". Women in the National Inventors Hall of Fame: The First 50 Years. Springer Nature. ISBN 9783031755255.
