= Oilskin =

Waterproof garment made from treated sailcloth or canvas

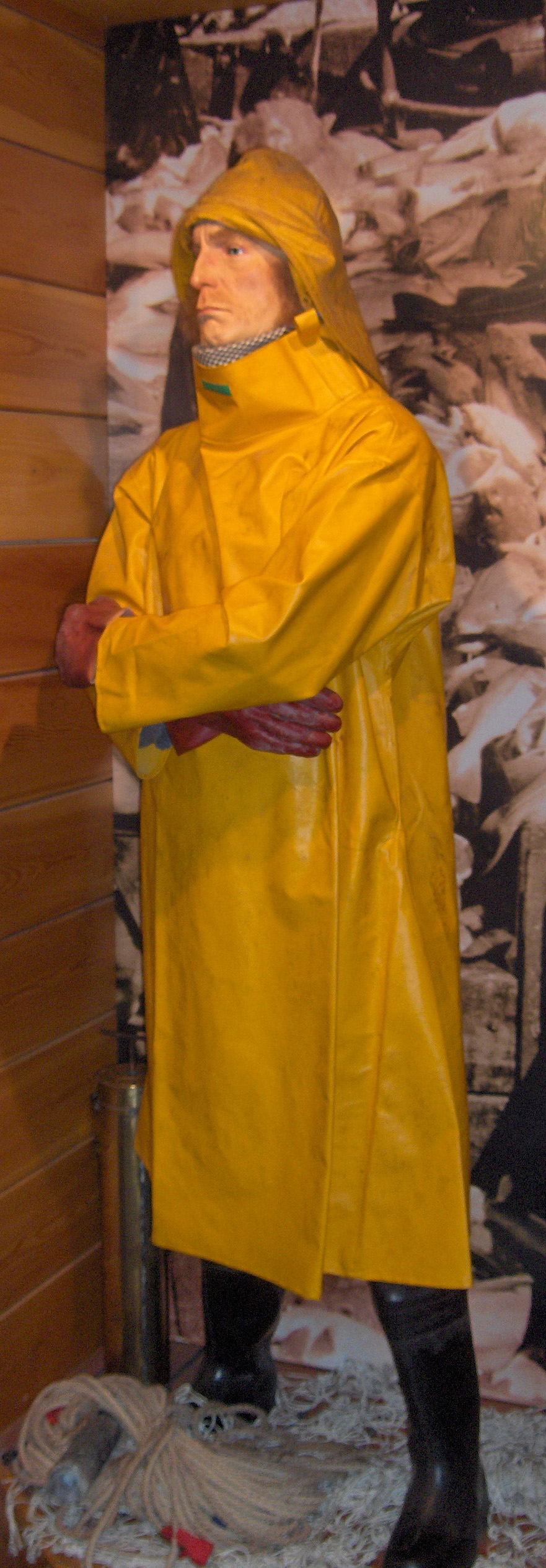
Oilskin jacket and sou'wester

Oilskin is a waterproof cloth used for making garments typically worn by sailors and by others in wet areas. The modern oilskin garment was developed by a New Zealander, Edward Le Roy, in 1898. Le Roy used worn-out sailcloth painted with a mixture of linseed oil and wax to produce a waterproof garment suitable to be worn on deck in foul-weather conditions. Oilskins are part of the range of protective clothing also known as foul-weather gear.

== History ==
Waterproofed cloth garments were in use from the 18th century. Many different methods of waterproofing were used over the years. Some early sou'westers and rain capes were handmade of sailcloth waterproofed with a thin layer of tar, while other methods involved canvas duck coated with multiple applications of linseed oil and paint. While durable, these methods of waterproofing did not possess the breathable qualities of Le Roy's process.

Modern oilskins may be made of flexible PVC-coated synthetic fabric, while advanced materials for extreme conditions such as yacht racing may be used. Also known as "foul weather gear", contemporary oilskins include such innovations as DWR-coated nylon on their low end and Gore-Tex and other proprietary waterproof membranes on the high.

A Sou'wester, a traditional form of collapsible oilskin rain-hat, is longer in the back than the front to fully protect the neck. Sou'westers sometimes feature a gutter front-brim.

== See also ==
- Oilcloth – Type of cloth with a waterproof coating
- Waxed cotton – Sturdy fabric waterproofed with wax
- Waxed jacket – Hip-length raincoat made from waxed cotton cloth
