= Waxed jacket =

Hip-length raincoat made from waxed cotton cloth

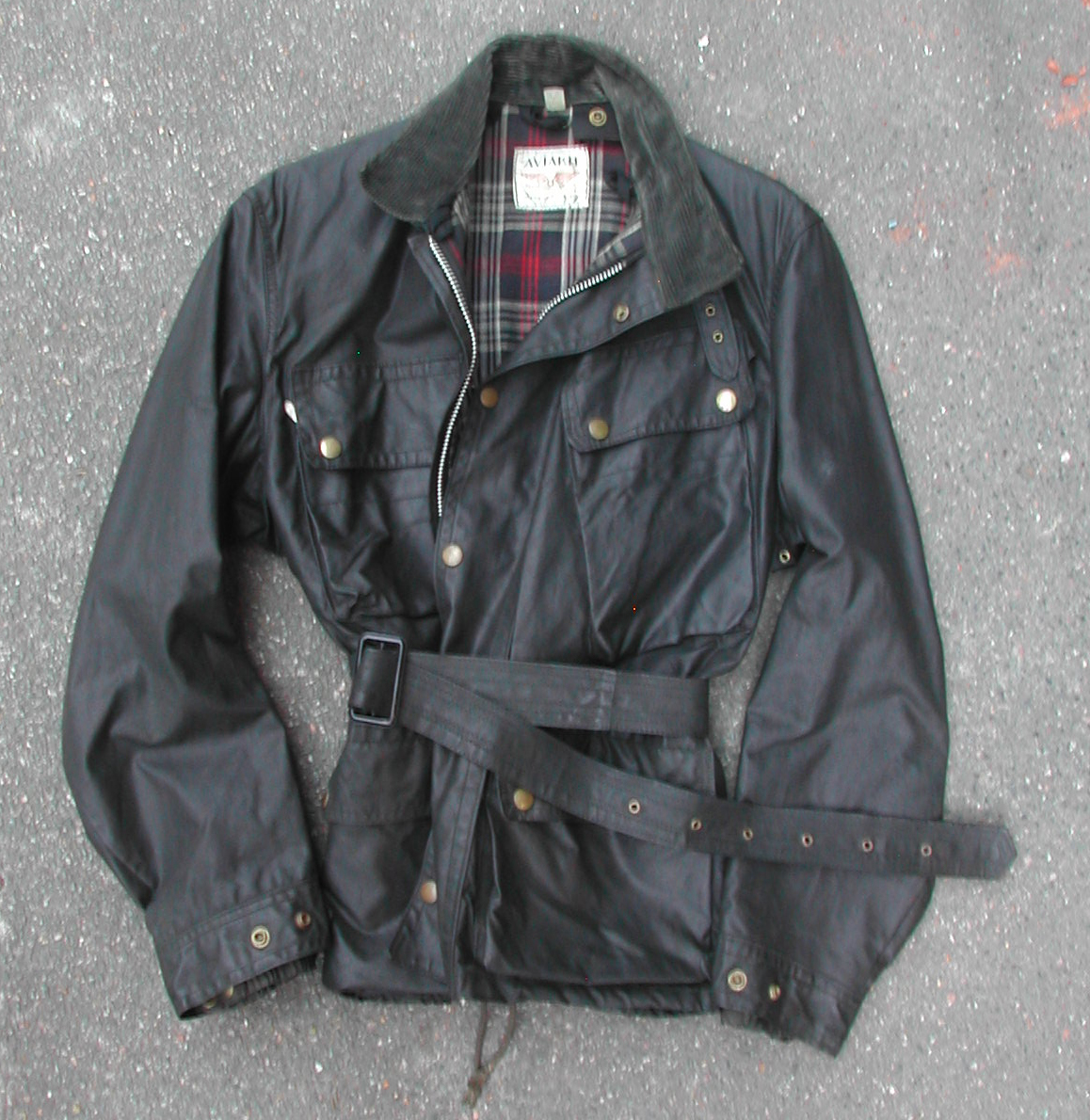
A waxed jacket made by Lewis Leathers.

A waxed jacket is a type of hip-length jacket made from waxed cotton cloth, iconic of British and Irish country life. Today it is commonly worn for outdoor rural pursuits such as hunting, shooting and fishing. It is a cotton jacket made water-resistant by a paraffin-based waxing, typically with a tartan lining and a corduroy or leather collar. Waxed jackets develop a patina over time. The main drawbacks of a waxed fabric is its lack of breathability and tendency to be heavier and bulkier than modern synthetic waterproof materials.

The origin of the waxed jacket is in the coated garments also known as oilskin. The company Barbour is particularly known for making wax jackets, among other manufacturers.

== See also ==
- British country clothing
