= Byrd Cloth =

Type of fabric

Byrd Cloth is a type of fabric similar to Grenfell Cloth which was designed in the 1934 by Harris Thurston and heavily promoted by Antarctic explorer Richard Byrd. The material was considered windproof, yet the weave allowed some air to penetrate and therefore allowed sweat to evaporate from the body rather than freeze against the skin. It was meant to replace the fur-lined parkas which had traditionally been used for cold-weather exploration, and was discovered to also be ideal for World War II army uniforms because it absorbed less sweat, repelled mosquito bites, and was much lighter weight than the existing cotton twill uniforms worn by soldiers in the Pacific theater of the war.

Byrd Cloth became trademarked by Reeves Brothers, Inc. of New York in 1975. The trademark expired in 1996. It is made from 100% cotton, and is considered windproof and water-resistant. As of 2018 it continues to be used in cold-weather clothing.
