= Samuel Smith (chemist) =

American chemist

- Samuel Smith (1927-2005)
- Born: September 13, 1927; New York City
- Died: January 6, 2005 (aged 77)
- Education: University of Michigan
- Occupation: Chemist
- Known for: Scotchgard Co-inventor

Samuel Smith (September 13, 1927 – January 1, 2005) was an American chemist who co-invented Scotchgard with Patsy Sherman while an employee at the 3M company in 1952.

== Biography ==
He was born in New York City and received his B.S. from the City College of New York and his M.S. from the University of Michigan in 1949. He held 30 U.S. patents and retired from 3M in 1998. He died on January 1, 2005.

== Legacy ==
Smith was an inductee in the National Inventors Hall of Fame.
