= Sauna suit =

Garment designed to induce sweating

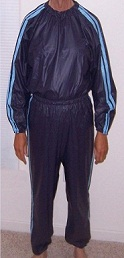
A typical sauna suit

A sauna suit is a garment made from waterproof fabric designed to make the wearer sweat profusely during exercise. A sauna suit is sometimes called a "rubber suit" because the early types were made of rubber or rubberized cloth. Now, sauna suits are typically made of PVC or coated nylon cloth. The construction is typically in the style of a waterproof sweat suit, consisting of a pullover jacket and drawstring pants. The closures at waist, neck, wrists and ankles are all elasticated to help retain body heat and moisture within the garment. In some sauna suits, the jacket also includes a hood to provide additional retention of body heat.

== Use in athletics ==
Sauna suits have been used by wrestlers for the rapid loss of water weight by perspiration-induced dehydration. Several healthy collegiate-level wrestlers died from hyperthermia while undergoing such a regimen that included restricted diet and fluid intake. Notable cases of death or serious injury as a result of sauna suits in athletics include:

- Jeff Reese, a University of Michigan wrestler who died of heart malfunction and kidney failure in 1997 in an attempt to rapidly lose 17 lbs in order to compete in a lower weight class
- Joseph LaRosa, a University of Wisconsin-La Crosse wrestler who died of heat stroke in 1997, also in an attempt to compete in the 150-lbs weight class
- Billy Jack Saylor, a Campbell University wrestler who died of a heart attack in 1997 while trying to lose 6 lbs for a meet
- Jamie Weaver, a Spackenkill High School student who contracted pneumonia in 1986 as a result of consistent sauna suit use in practice
- Daniel Cormier, captain of the United States Olympic freestyle wrestling team for the 2008 Beijing Olympics, who lost so much weight from sauna suits that he had to drop out of the competition prior due to falling ill
- Jessica Lindsay, a Muay Thai fighter who died from multiple organ failure during a match due to sauna suit-induced hyperthermia after being pressured to cut 17 lbs in a week

In 1977, the National Federation of State High School Associations, a sports governing body in the United States, implemented a rule that prohibited the use of sauna suits and suits made of similar materials for sports practice due to health concerns.

The NCAA banned the use of sauna suits in 2013 ending what they called "a 10-year long dispute between sports sciences and coaches" after the wrestlers died. The NCAA said the ban ushered in an era where safe minimum weights, class qualification and nutrition are guided by science, which some enthusiasts say improved the participation and quality of the sport.

Additionally, a 2022 study by the British Journal of Sports Medicine found that wrestlers who participated in perspiration-induced dehydration were more at-risk for injuries during competition than those who didn't.

== See also ==
- Sportswear
