= Margaret Barbour =

British businesswoman and philanthropist

Dame Margaret Barbour DBE DL (née Davies; born February 1940) is a British businesswoman and philanthropist best known as the current Chairman of J. Barbour & Sons.

Together with her daughter, Helen Barbour, she established the Women's Fund in 1999 to encourage and support women within Tyne & Wear and Northumberland to develop their full potential. In 2000, in memory of her mother in law, Barbour set up The Nancy Barbour Award, an award within the Women's Fund that recognises organisations helping women to play a more active part in the community, particularly those who work with a disability.

== Personal life ==
Born Margaret Davies in 1940, she was married to the late John Malcolm Barbour (who died in 1968) whose ancestor, John Barbour, had founded the clothing firm J. Barbour & Sons in 1894. She has one daughter, Helen Mary Barbour. She has held the office of Company Chairman of J. Barbour & Sons since 1972. She remarried in 1991.

== Business background ==
A teacher originally, she is credited as "[having] reinvented the waterproof wax clothes firm, J. Barbour & Sons". She turned the company's rustic clothes, initially designed for seamen, river workers, motorcyclists and Royal Navy submariners, into "a fashion accessory for the 1980s Sloane Rangers and the British upper-class country set."

She then turned the rural brand into an international urban fashion icon in the 40 countries where it is represented through the company's local offices and network of retailers and distributors.

== Quotes ==
"This [honour] is not just for me, but for the company; everybody in my hardworking force in the North East of England." (Margaret Barbour on her Damehood)

== Honours/affiliations ==
In addition to the CBE and the DBE, Margaret Barbour was a Deputy Lieutenant of Tyne and Wear, an honorary doctor of business administration as awarded by the University of Sunderland, as well as an honorary doctor of civil law as awarded by the University of Newcastle upon Tyne.

She is also a past president of the Royal Warrant Holders Association and the first woman to hold this position, the chairman of J. Barbour & Sons and the chairman of the Barbour Charitable Trust, founded in 1988.

In 2021, Barbour received a 2020 Lifetime Achievement award from the Entrepreneurs' Forum.

In May 2021, Barbour inaugurated a new building at Newcastle University which is named after her. The Dame Margaret Barbour Building houses the university's educational facilities, including study spaces and a lecture theatre seating 300 students. The building, which is near to Richardson Road, also houses specialised rooms for sport and exercise science, human nutrition and dietetics, psychology, and medical education.

In 2024 The British Fashion Council announced that Barbour will receive a Special Recognition Award for her contribution to the fashion industry.
