= Wood Wood =

Danish fashion and lifestyle brand

- Industry: Fashion
- Founded: 2002; 24 years ago
- Founder: Karl Oskar Olsen and Brian SS Jensen
- Headquarters: Grønnegade; Copenhagen
- Website: woodwood.com

Wood Wood is a contemporary fashion and lifestyle brand founded in 2002 and based in Copenhagen, Denmark. It has stores in Berlin, London, Aarhus and Copenhagen, and an online store. Wood Wood is directed by co-founders Karl-Oskar Olsen and Brian SS Jensen.

As a sub-cultural founded lifestyle brand, its founders grew up with graffiti and street culture in the 1990s. They mix high-end fashion, sports and streetwear with youth and urban culture, art and music. A Wood Wood yellow T-shirt was worn by Sigrid in the video for "Strangers" giving the brand international exposure. It is described as Contemporary Streetwear. Wood Wood has a strong sports component. It started as a small shop selling T-shirts and evolved into well-established fashion brand showing new collections in Florence and London.

It is based in Nørrebro in Copenhagen, Denmark. Wood Wood has made more than 50 collaborations with global brands such as Nike, Asics, Barbour, Eastpak, Lego and Adidas, hand with niche brands and artists such as Peter Sutherland, Elmgreen & Dragset, So-Me and FUZI UVTPK. In November, 2022 a special version of Artek Stool 60 was relised.

In 2019, it was announced that Wood Wood would be opening a store in Soho, London. Currently, the brand operates four stores in Denmark and two in Berlin, Germany.

Spacon&X has designed the Wood Wood Berlin store (2020), Wood Wood, Soho London store (2020), Wood Wood, CPH Airport store, Copenhagen (2018), Wood Wood Revolver Exhibition Booth, Copenhagen (2018), Wood Wood Museum, Copenhagen (2017), Wood Wood AA Display System (2017), Wood Wood Revolver Exhibition Booth, Copenhagen (2017). These projects were followed by pop-up store ARTEFACT for Roskilde Festival by Studio Gestalt in 2022.
