= Ally Capellino =

Independent British designer brand

- Company type: Private company
- Industry: Accessories
- Founded: London, England (1980)
- Founder: Alison Lloyd, Jonathan Platt
- Headquarters: London, England
- Key people: Alison Lloyd
- Website: www.allycapellino.co.uk

Ally Capellino is an independent British designer brand that was established in 1980 by Alison Lloyd and Jonathan Platt. Originally launching as an accessories company (the name is from the Italian for "little head"), and later expanding into classic tailoring and ready to wear, it has been described as the label that: "dominated the wardrobes of many sensible and stylish women throughout the 80s and into the 90s". Following the restructuring of the original company in 1999, Lloyd relaunched Ally Capellino alone, focusing on bags. The brand now retails through its London shop in Calvert Avenue, Shoreditch, and online. Collaborations include a branded range for Apple and the Tate Gallery.

== History ==
After studying fashion and textiles at Middlesex University, Alison Lloyd designed clothes destined for M&S at Courtaulds' central design studio, before launching Ally Capellino in 1980 with her then partner Jonathan Platt. Ally Capellino's first London Fashion Week show was in 1986 and it also expanded into menswear in the same year. In 1987, Ally Capellino signed a licensing agreement with the Japanese firm GCO Company and five years later, in 1992, it signed a design consultancy and licensing agreement with Coats Viyella. Notably, it became one of the first British fashion names of this era to break into the Japanese market in the early '90s. Lloyd restructured the business alone in 2000, with a focus on bags.

In 2005, Ally Capellino opened a shop in Shoreditch and launched their e-commerce site. A further shop opened on Portobello Road in 2011 followed by a third shop in Marylebone in summer 2015.

In November 2014 Lloyd was awarded an honorary Doctorate from the University of Hertfordshire School of Creative Arts for her contribution to Fashion.

In December 2019, the parent company of Ally Capellino merged with Authentic Bespoke Group. In August 2023 Lloyd took back full ownership of the company.

== Collaborations ==
- In 2006 Ally Capellino began working with Tate galleries, producing a range of goods for artists including a satchel, apron and pencil case.
- In 2008 the label began a collaboration with Apple, designing laptop bags for Apple's European market.
- In 2011 Ally Capellino collaborated on a rucksack with the Danish fashion brand Norse Project.
- In September 2013, Ally Capellino created a range of leather goods exclusively for Ace Hotel in Shoreditch London.
- In 2014 Ally Capellino collaborated with the food journal The Gourmand on a limited edition Market Bag.
- In early 2022, Ally Capellino collaborated with Barbour, creating a range of jackets, hats, and backpacks.

== Exhibitions ==
In 2010, Ally Capellino marked its 30-year anniversary with an exhibition at The Wapping Project. In 2013, as part of the London Design Festival, Ally Capellino's first chair collection ‘Bums on Seats’ was exhibited at the V&A's Sackler gallery and as part of the 'Best of Britannia' exhibition in Clerkenwell. In the same year, Ally Capellino featured in the V&A's 'Club to Catwalk' exhibition, which profiled the London fashion scene of the 1980s.
