= Barbour (company) =

English luxury fashion brand

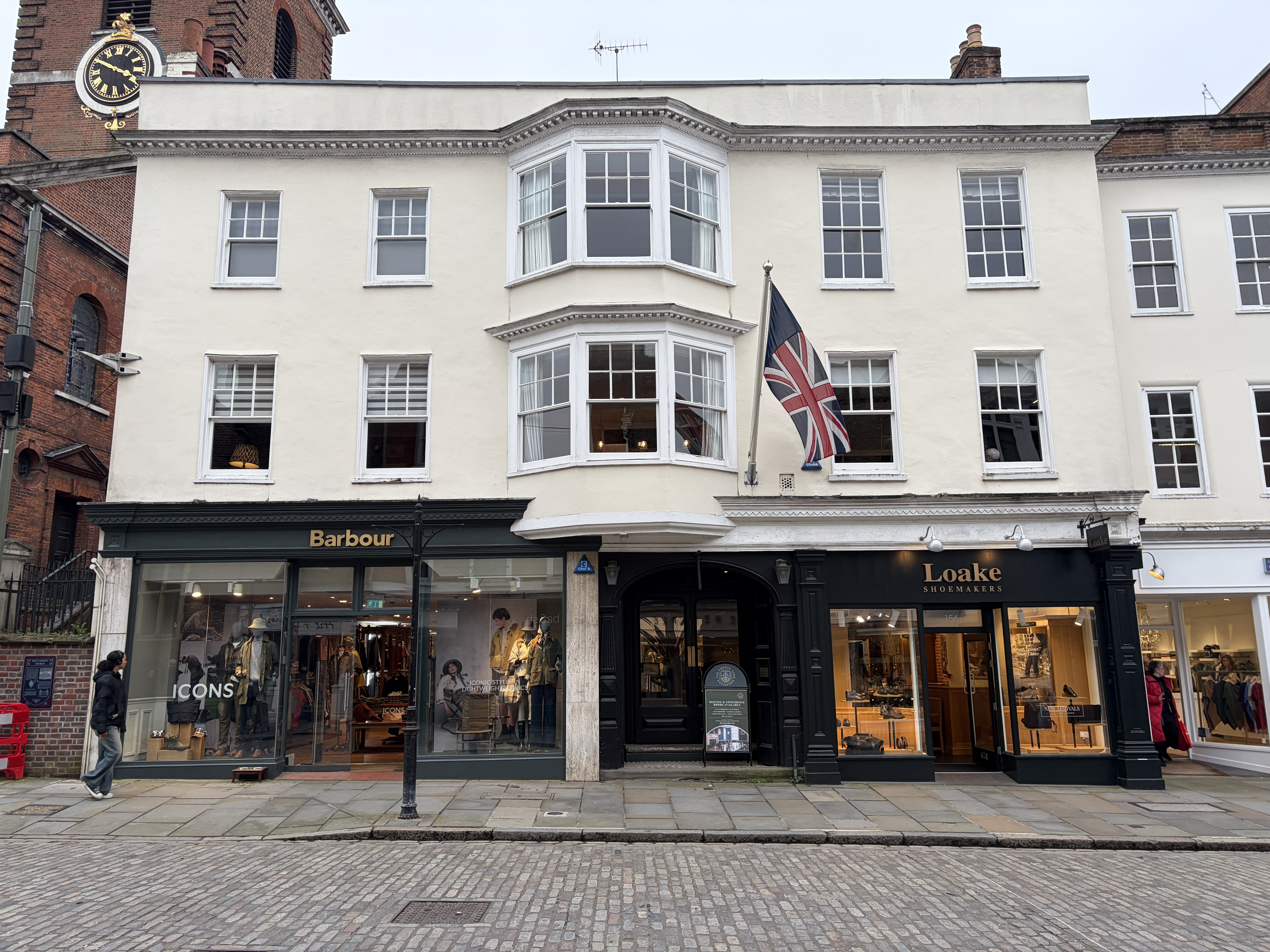
- Barbour boutique in Guildford
- Trade name: Barbour
- Type: Private
- Industry: Fashion
- Founded: 1894; 132 years ago in South Shields, England
- Founder: John Barbour
- Headquarters: Simonside, South Shields, England
- Number of locations: 30+ retail stores
- Area served: Worldwide
- Key people: Margaret Barbour (Chairman); Stephen Buck (managing director); Helen Barbour (Vice Chair)
- Products: Outerwear; ready-to-wear; footwear; accessories
- Revenue: £225 million for YE 30 April 2019
- Parent: J. Barbour & Sons, Limited
- Website: barbour.com

Barbour, legally J. Barbour & Sons, Limited, is an English designer clothing and lifestyle brand founded by John Barbour in 1894 that designs, manufactures and markets waxed cotton outerwear, ready-to-wear clothing, footwear and accessories under the Barbour and Barbour International brands.

Founded in South Shields, England, as an importer of oil cloth, J. Barbour and Sons Ltd became known for its waxed cotton jackets, a common element of British country clothing; some refer to any waxed cotton jacket, regardless of brand, as a "Barbour jacket". Barbour holds royal warrants for the supply of ‘waterproof and protective clothing’ from the Duke of Edinburgh (1974), Queen Elizabeth II (1982) and King Charles III (1987).

== History ==
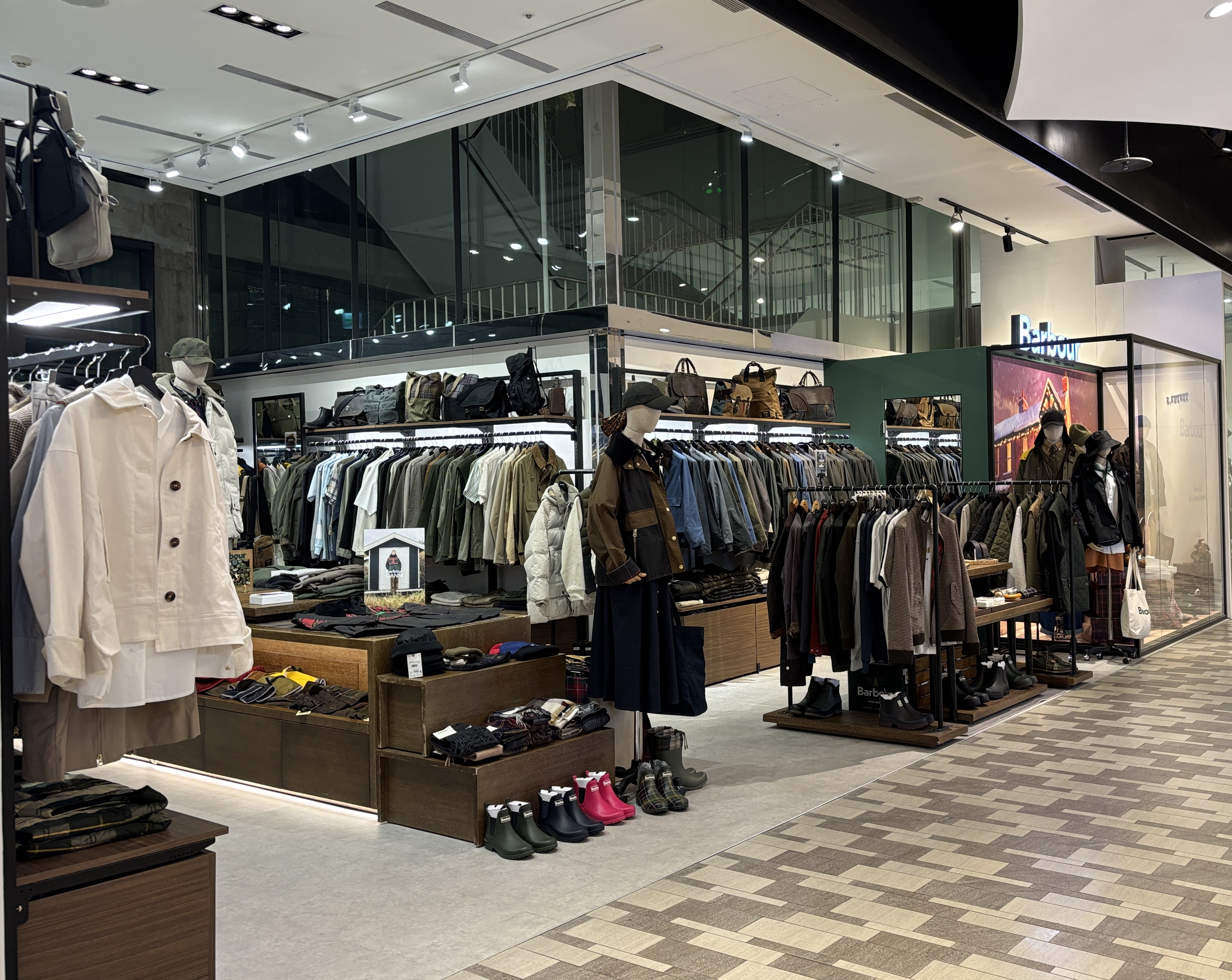
Barbour boutique in Taipei

John Barbour, a native of Galloway, Scotland, founded J. Barbour and Sons Ltd in South Shields, England, in 1894 as an importer of oil-cloth.

The surrounding community included seamen and sailors, Barbour produced clothing suitable for the harsh weather conditions they faced in the North Sea. During WWII, Barbour created weatherproof outdoor clothing for the military, including the submarine service.

John's grandson Duncan was a keen motorcyclist and during his tenure Barbour became the originator of waxed cotton motorcycling suits. The iconic wax cotton international motorcycle jacket was worn by many riders in the International Six Day Trials circuit, with Steve McQueen being one of the well known riders to have worn it.

In 1983, Barbour introduced the waxed hunting jacket model that remains most commonly associated with the brand: the Beaufort Jacket. Its design is French in origin, but tailored to suit British needs. Its waxed olive exterior and brown corduroy collar, along with its tartan lining and spacious front pockets, made it a favorite with both the British royal family as well as the general public. The late Queen Elizabeth was reportedly so fond of her Beaufort Jacket that despite repeated offers from the company to replace her well-worn favourite, she opted to keep the original for 25 years.

The headquarters for J. Barbour and Sons Ltd at the time of its foundation was Market Place, South Shields and the company remains in Simonside, South Shields today having occupied its current site since the 1980s.

Since July 2016, Scottish actor Sam Heughan is Barbour's First Global Brand Ambassador.

== Leadership ==
Since the incorporation of J. Barbour & Sons as a limited company in 1912, the company has always been led by a member of the Barbour family. The company is currently led by the family's fourth generation, Dame Margaret Barbour, who took over in 1973 after the death of her mother-in-law, Nancy Barbour. The family's fifth generation is represented by Helen Barbour, who has been the Vice Chair since 1997 and is next in line for the chairmanship.

=== List of chairmen ===
1. John Barbour (1912–1927)
2. Malcolm Barbour (1927–1964)
3. Nancy Barbour (1964–1973)
4. Dame Margaret Barbour (since 1973)

== Products ==
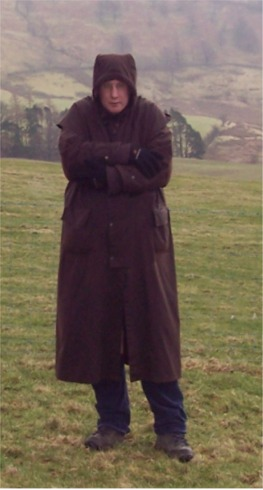
Modern Barbour 'Stockman' coat

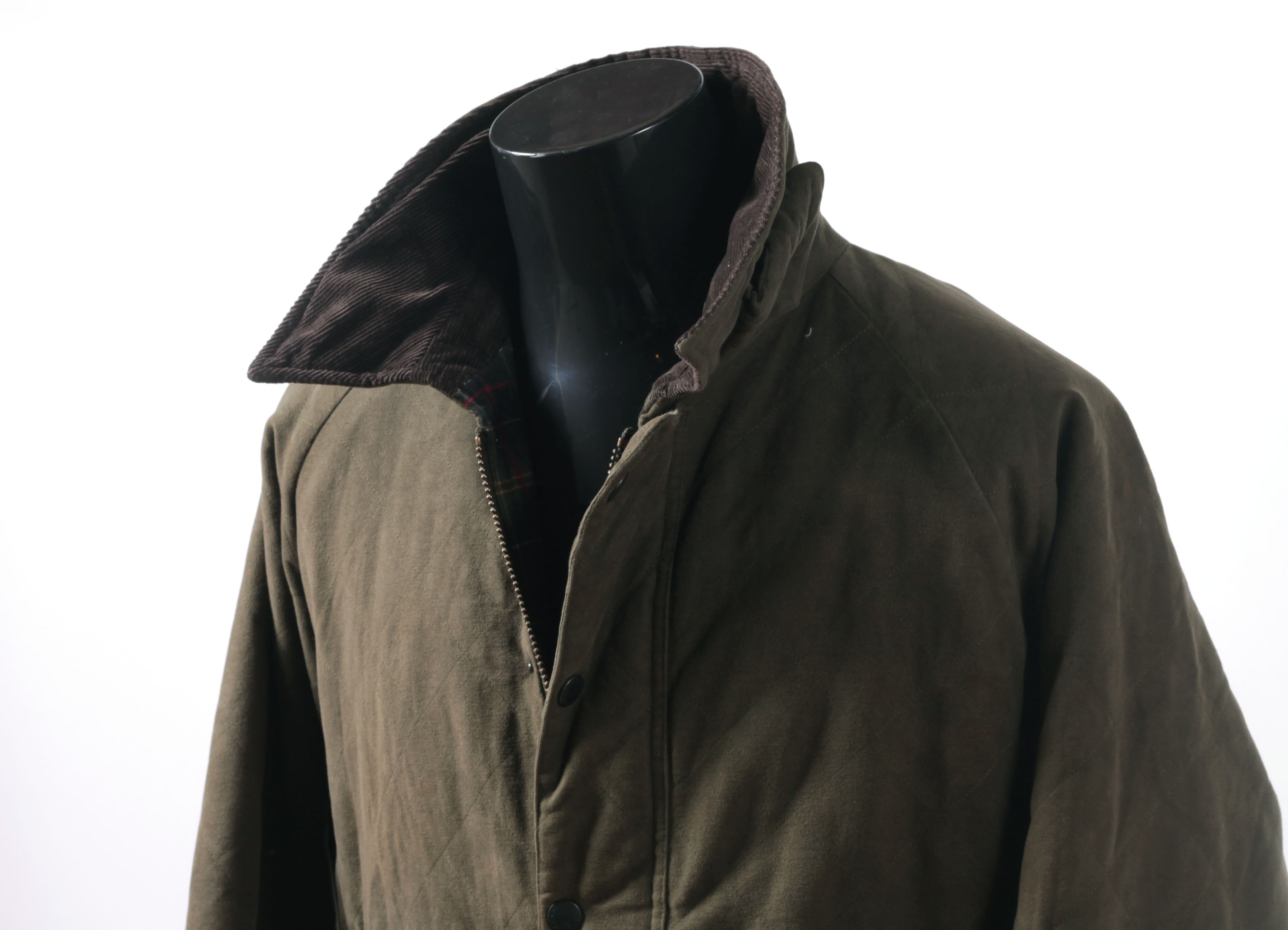
A men's waxed cotton Barbour jacket in green

Barbour is best known for its lines of jackets, in particular the Beaufort Jacket introduced in 1983 that quickly became a favourite among British royals and aristocrats, as well as the general public. Widely imitated since its launch, its waxed olive exterior and oversized corduroy collar are now associated with British country life worldwide.

In addition to its waxed and quilted jackets, J. Barbour & Sons Ltd is famous for sweaters, moleskin clothing, corduroy clothing, and tattersall shirts. Barbour entered the "waterproof-breathable" market with its own type of waterproof liners, Cordura external fabric, and polar fleece sweaters. Some Barbour products contain outdoor-orientated features such as snug-fitting collars, "storm cuffs", waterproof pockets with drainage holes, and wide "game" pockets.

In recent years, the company modernised its collections to appeal to a younger clientele while maintaining credibility with the traditional countryside customer. Many of the more fashionable ranges are influenced by the "Barbour International" motorcycling ranges. Taking inspiration from the company's 1936 waxed cotton motorcycling suit and the 1951 "Original Green" motorcycling jacket, modern collections are fashionable interpretations of the companies heritage in bikes. While the traditional waxed cotton jackets are still manufactured in Simonside, South Shields, some of the other products are manufactured outside the United Kingdom. Nonetheless, Barbour's motorcyclist attire became overshadowed by its much more popular hunting attire, including its waxed as well as quilted jackets, and today Belstaff has supplanted the brand's place among motorcycle enthusiasts.

Despite traditional connotations with rural life, Barbour jackets saw increased popularity as an urban fashion item in the 2010s decade. In the 2010s Barbour collaborated with several urban fashion brands including Wood Wood, Ally Capellino and White Mountaineering.

== Services ==
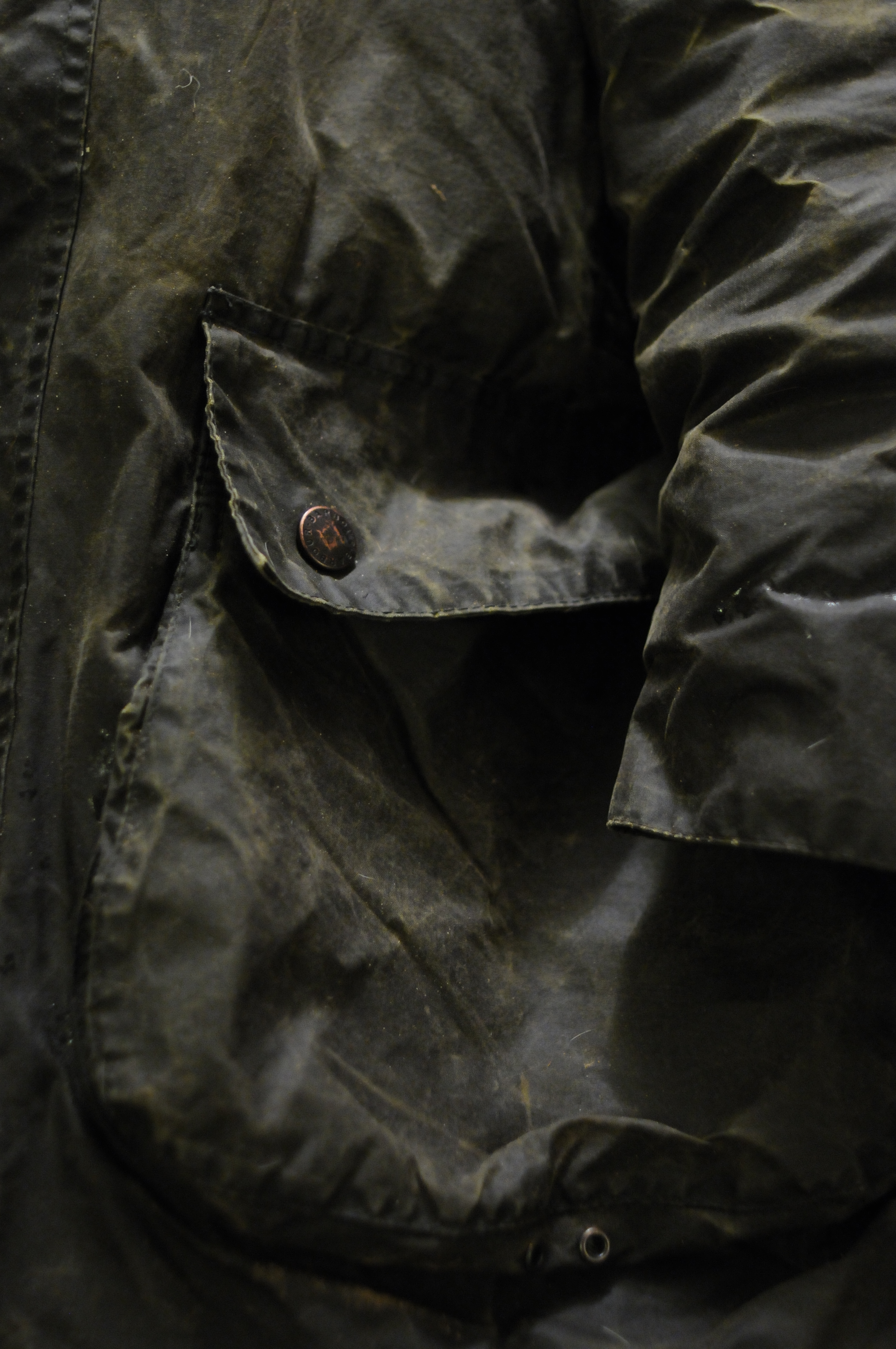
Pocket of a green Barbour jacket showing wear

Wear-and-tear on Barbour garments can be addressed by Barbour's repair service, which patches and reinforces jackets. Barbour repairs and rewaxes over 60,000 jackets annually at their factory in Simonside, South Shields and at other facilities. Ahead of current sustainability trends, Barbour have been re-waxing clothing for over 100 years, increasing the garments longevity.

Aside from offering merchandise within Barbour retail stores and via the Barbour website, Barbour wholesales all of its collections to many upscale shops worldwide.

== In popular culture ==
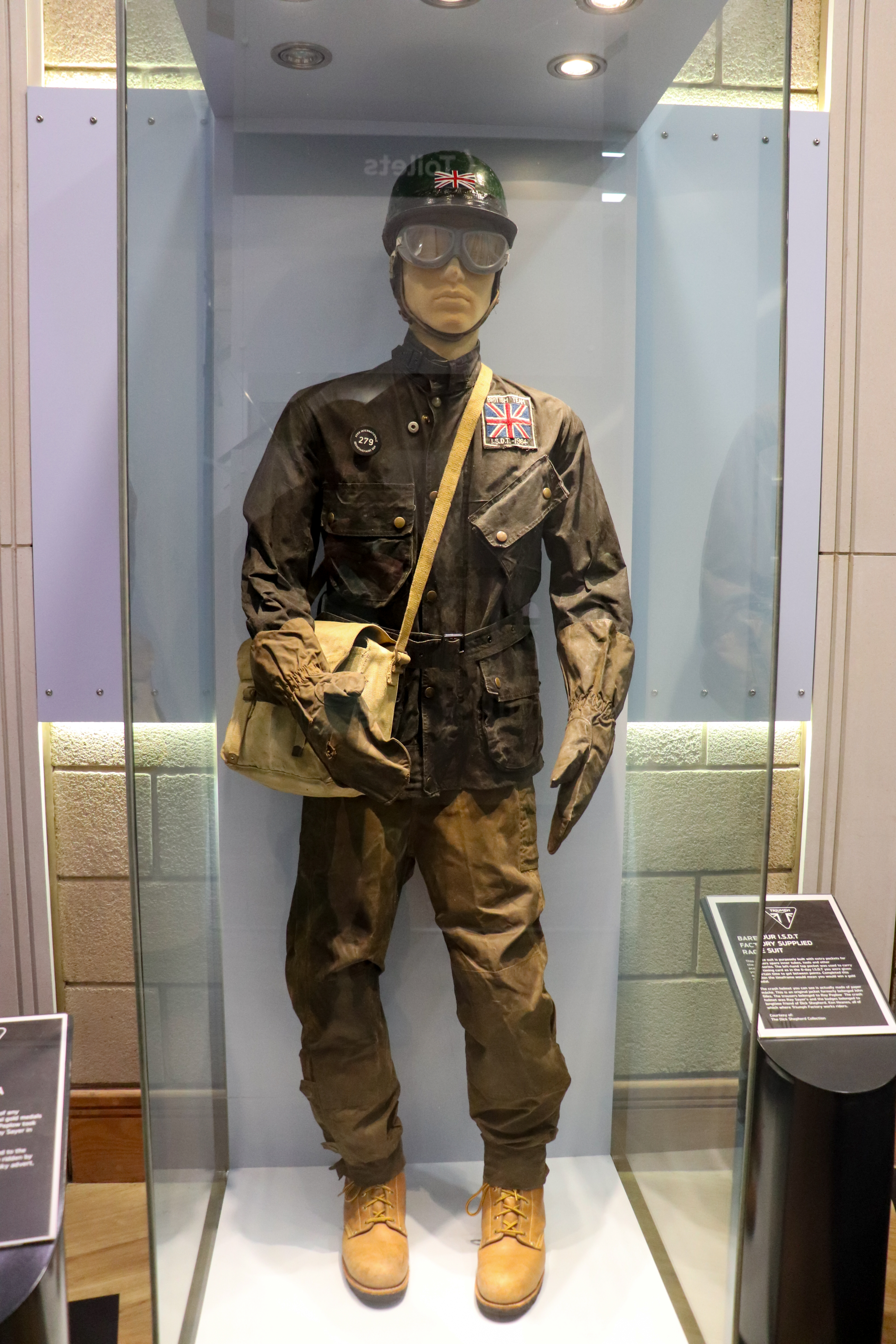
Motorcycle racing jacket for ISDT, formerly owned by John Giles

Most of the British royal family – including King Charles, Prince William, Princess Kate, and the late Queen Elizabeth and Prince Philip, Duke of Edinburgh, and Princess Diana – have been routinely photographed in Barbour hunting attire for decades, with new photos of Barbour-attired royals published globally on a regular basis. Barbour's waxed jackets and coats have appeared in 2012's Skyfall, in which James Bond, played by Daniel Craig wears a modified Barbour jacket. Barbour has a long-standing line of clothing inspired by actor and avid motorcycle racer Steve McQueen, who exclusively wore Barbour during races.
