= Grenfell (brand) =

British luxury fashion house

Grenfell is a British luxury fashion house established in 1923 by Sir Wilfred Grenfell and headquartered in London, England. It is known for the "Grenfell cloth", a tough, lightweight and water-resistant cotton fabric.

== Grenfell cloth ==
The grenfell cloth is a densely-woven cotton gabardine material used to make luxury and outdoor clothing since its creation in 1923. It was named after Sir Wilfred Grenfell, a British medical missionary working extensively in Newfoundland. He required a cloth to be woven to protect himself from the snow, wind, wet and cold weather he encountered in his work.

The cloth is made from 600 thread-per-inch cotton originally by T. Haythornthwaite & Sons Ltd at Lodge Mill, Burnley, in the United Kingdom. It is similar to Byrd Cloth.

After Japanese ownership in the 1980s and 1990s, Grenfell Cloth garments are once again manufactured in Britain. Grenfell is now based in London.

Grenfell Cloth has been used on many expeditions.

== See also ==
- Ventile – 1995 trademark for fabrics used in waterproof clothing
