= Oilcloth =

Type of cloth with a waterproof coating

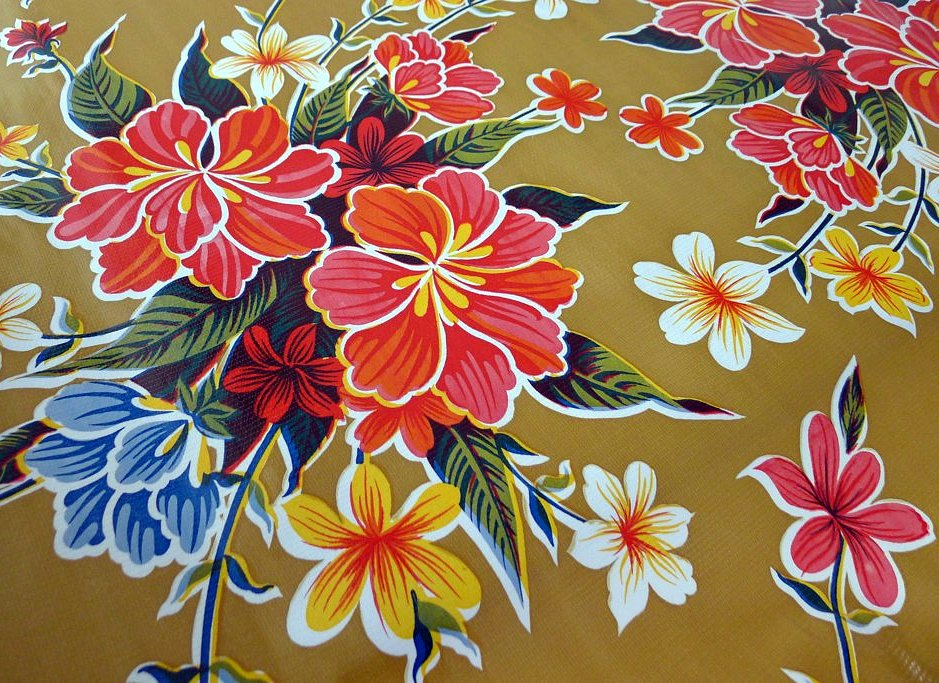
Traditional oilcloth

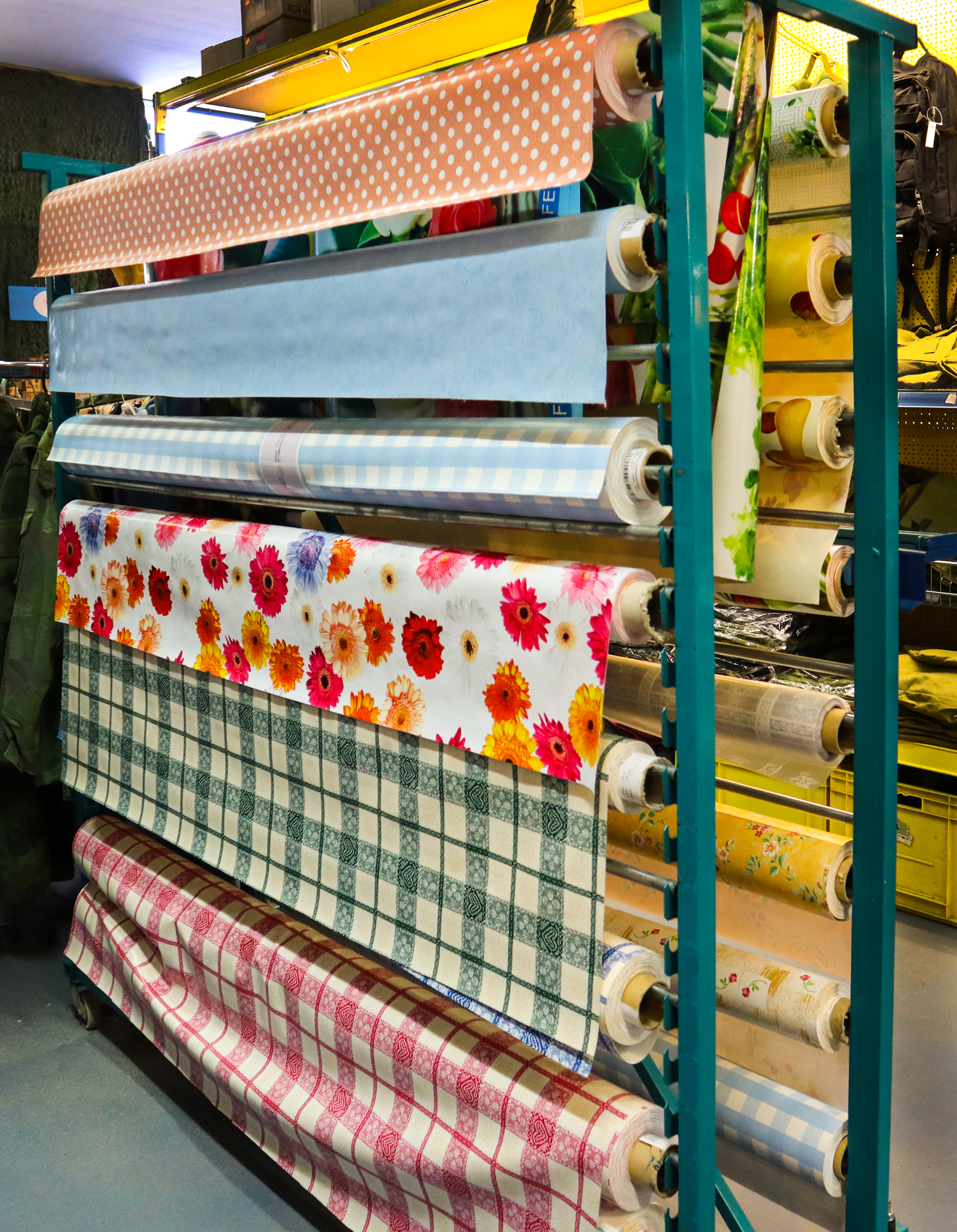
Rolls of oilcloth

Oilcloth, also known as enameled cloth or American cloth, is close-woven cotton duck or linen cloth with a coating of boiled linseed oil to make it waterproof.

== Manufacture ==
Boiled linseed oil was prepared by a long boiling of linseed oil with metal salts, originally lead dross. The modern oil is less toxic, but also less suitable for making oilcloth. Re-enactors may boil their own oil in the search for a correctly coloured oilcloth. Traditionally, lead and manganese oxides, the latter sometimes derived from sienna or umber, were used as siccatives in oilcloth production.

The fabric was first stretched on a tenter frame and sized with animal gelatine. The oil was then applied and allowed to cure between coats. As the cure relies on oxidation by the air, thin coats and long cure times between are required.

Overlaps between sheets of fresh oilcloth would amalgamate naturally when pressed together. This tendency also led to the cloth sticking together when folded. The cloth was waxed or dusted with pumice to reduce sticking when folding was required.

Seams in traditional oilcloth could be coated after sewing to reduce leakage through their stitching. This was generally unsatisfactory for clothing though and so overcoats of this era would incorporate one or more short capes over the shoulders. These capes were made in one piece and covered the inevitable shoulder seams in the main garment. These capes remain today in garments such as the Ulster and Inverness.

In the 19th century, waxed cotton and Mackintosh developed and began to gradually replace oilcloth, especially for clothing.

== Applications ==
Historically, pre-19th century, oilcloth was one of very few flexible, waterproof materials that were widely available. Leather was expensive and required regular maintenance if it got wet. Oilcloth was used as an outer waterproof layer for luggage, whether wooden trunks or flexible satchels, and for carriages and weatherproof clothing.

The most familiar recent use was for brightly printed kitchen tablecloths. Dull-colored oilcloth was used for bedrolls, sou'westers, and tents. By the late 1950s, oilcloth became a synonym for vinyl (polyvinyl chloride) bonded to either a flanneled cloth or a printed vinyl with a synthetic non-woven backing.

== See also ==
- Linoleum – Type of floor covering
- Glossary of textile manufacturing
- Gore-Tex – Trademark for a waterproof, breathable fabric
- Oilskin – Waterproof garment made from treated sailcloth or canvas
- Waxed cotton – Sturdy fabric waterproofed with wax
