= Beeswax wrap =

Food wrap material using coated cotton

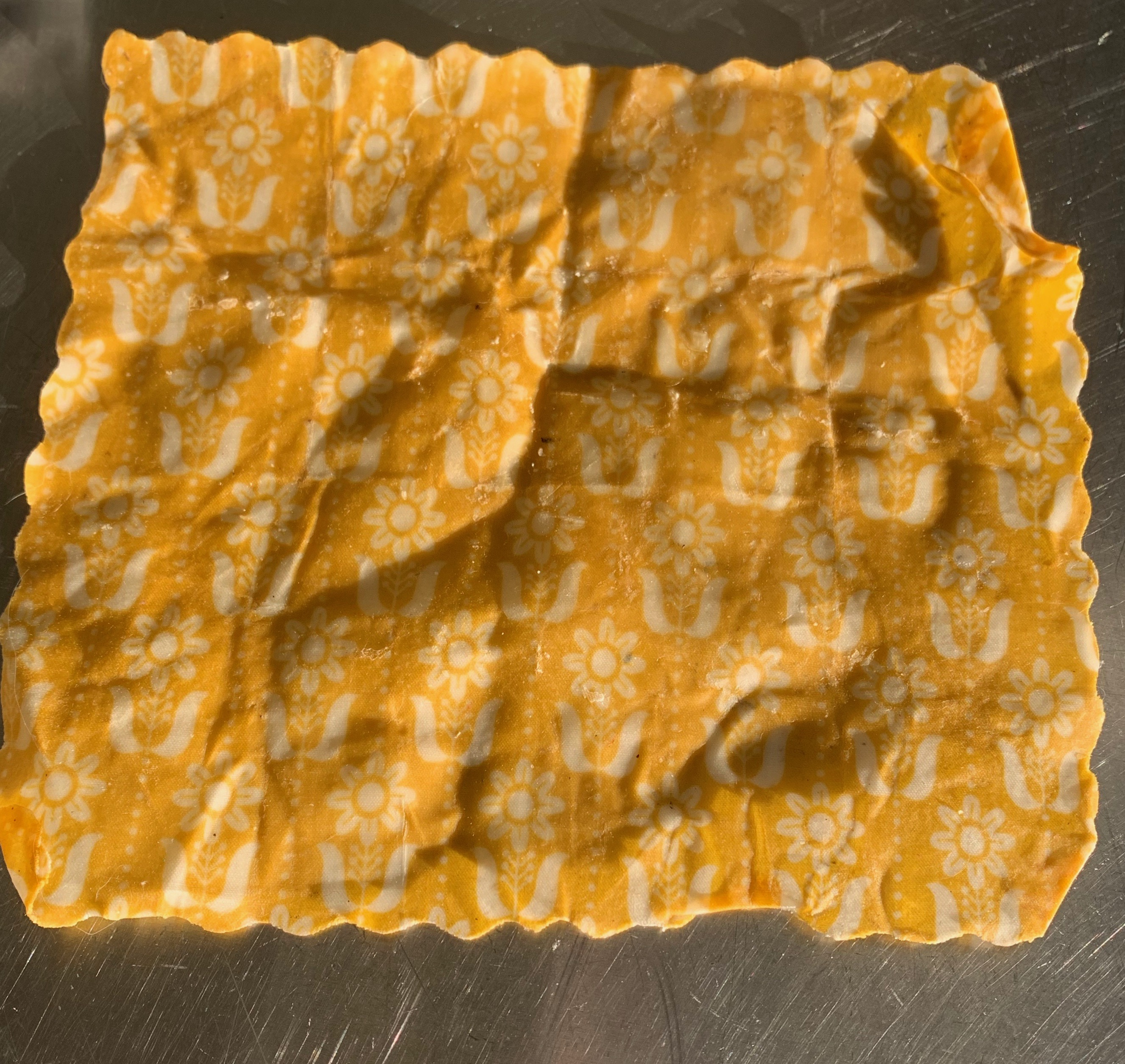
17.5cm by 20cm beeswax wrap

Beeswax wrap is a food wrap material consisting of a coated fabric, most commonly cotton. It is made by infusing cotton with food-grade beeswax, rosin, coconut oil, and jojoba oil. The wrap is mouldable, grippable, and tacky. It can be shaped around containers or food products. Beeswax wrap is a reusable and sustainable alternative to plastic wrap and single-use plastic. It has the ability to counteract environmental issues such as plastic pollution and food waste.

Beeswax wrap's main use is food preservation. It is breathable and allows food to stay fresh for longer, reducing food wastage. After each use, beeswax wrap can be washed and air-dried. Beeswax wrap usually loses its grip after one year. When the wrap loses its grip it can be composted. Beeswax wrap is criticized for its high price when sold commercially and the high level of maintenance it requires, especially when compared to its single-use plastic alternatives.

== Uses ==
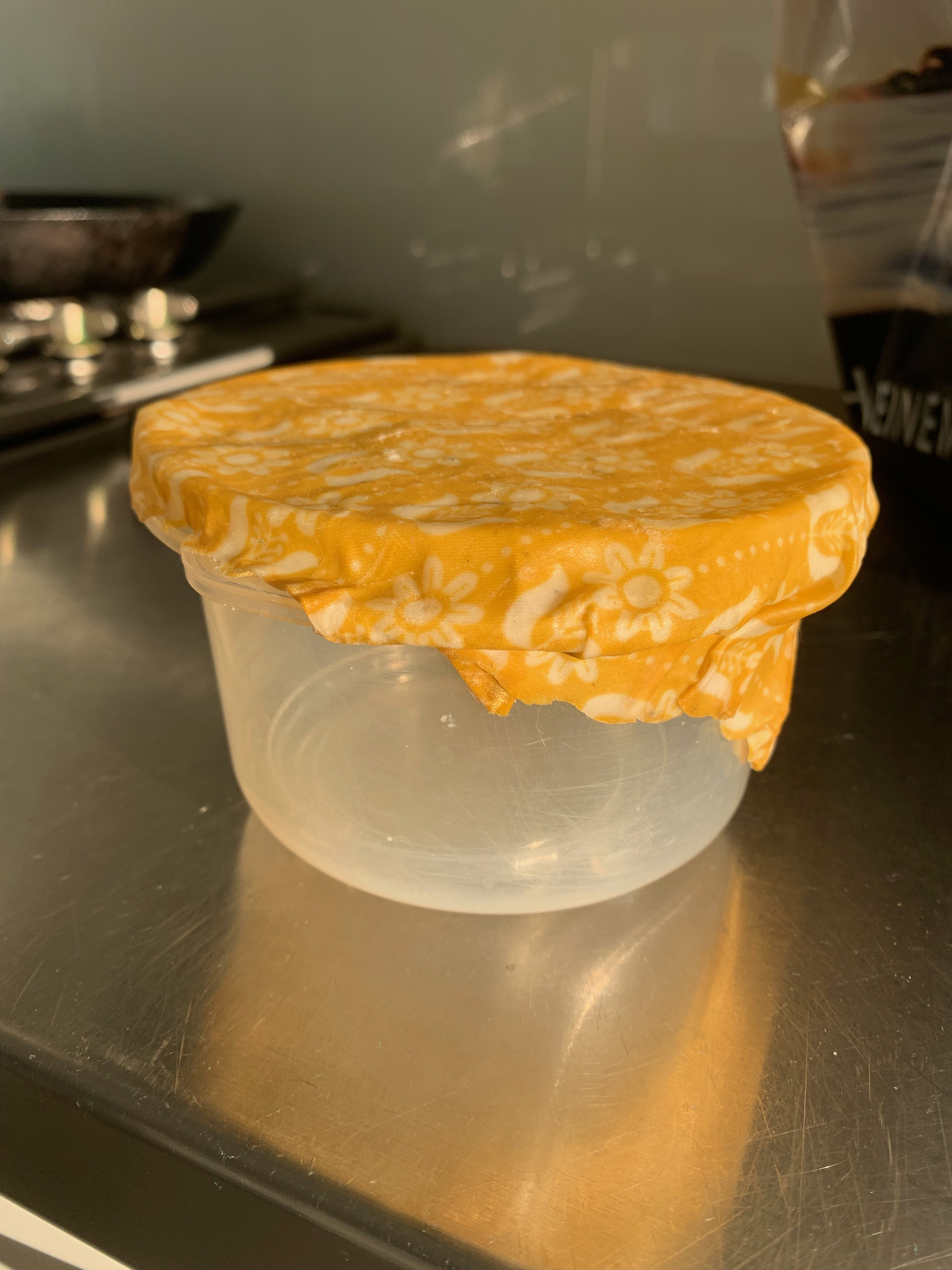
Beeswax wrap being used to cover a container

Beeswax wrap is used by moulding it around food products, containers or bowls. This is done by heating the beeswax wrap with one's hands and then shaping it around the item. The warmth of one's hands melts the beeswax, softening the wrap enough to create a seal around containers and food products. Beeswax wraps are not ideal for wrapping all types of food. For example, raw meat, raw fish or other wet food items such as rock melon. These wet foods can be placed in a bowl or container which can then be covered with the beeswax wrap. More alternative uses of beeswax wrap include as a flower vase or as a water cup.

=== Maintenance ===
The usable life of beeswax wrap depends on how often it is used, washed and maintained. Often beeswax wrap can be rinsed and air-dried after single uses. If the wrap requires more thorough cleaning, it can be sponged with soapy, cold water, rinsed and hung to air dry. Cracks in beeswax wraps can be fixed by either laying it on a baking tray in the sun or an oven and by warming it using a hairdryer. This process is referred to as 'warming' and allows the wax to melt and mould back together. This seals the cracks that have begun to form.

=== Disposal ===
When beeswax wrap has lost its grip and is no longer useful, it can be composted to biodegrade. It can also be put to a second purpose and used to make an effective fire starter.

== Production ==
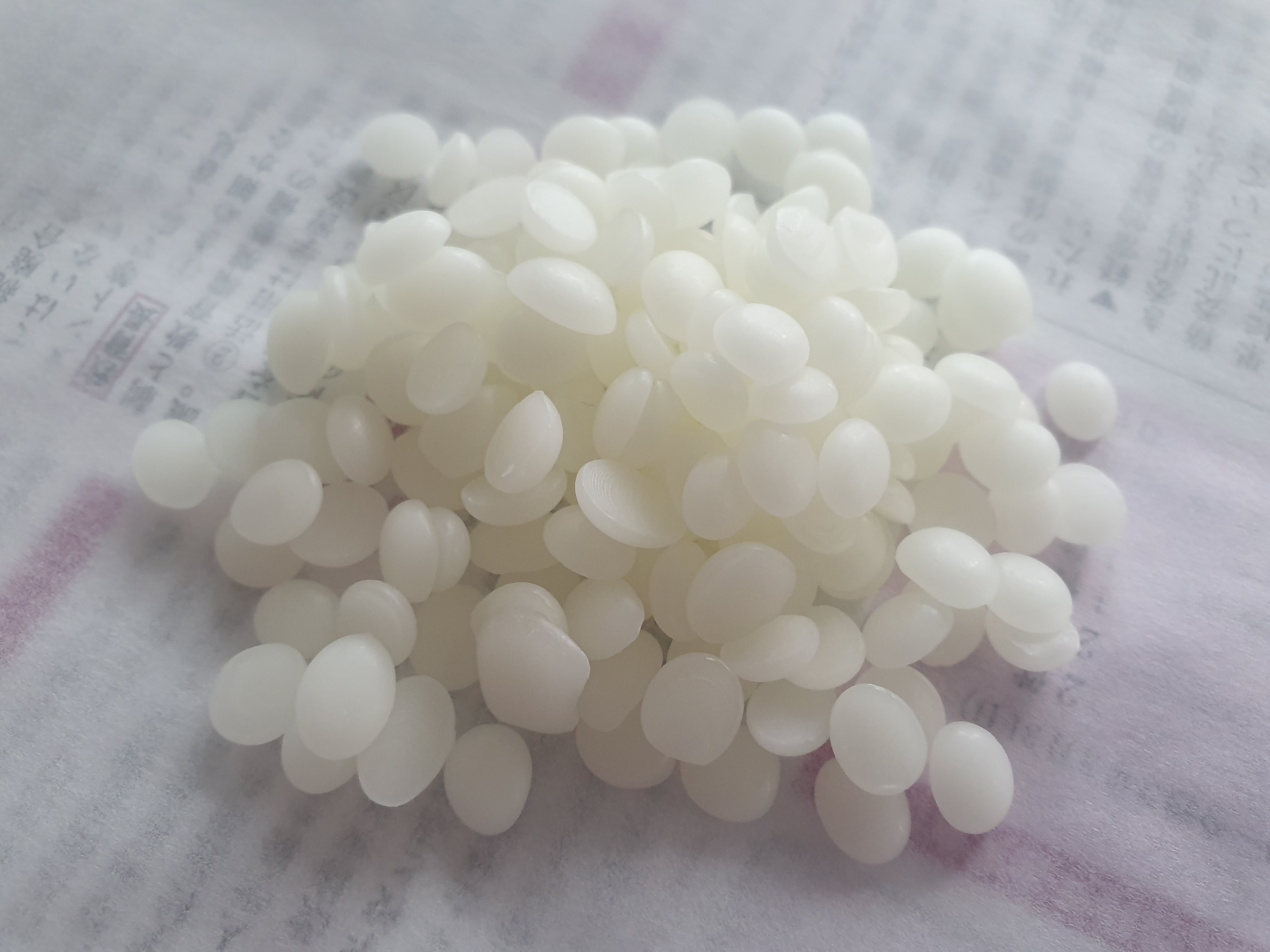
Food-grade beeswax pellets

Beeswax wrap is made by infusing cotton with resin, food-grade beeswax and an oil, commonly coconut or jojoba. The wax coating allows the cloth to be breathable and waterproof. Beeswax is harvested when honey is extracted from beehives. The wax caps are sliced off the hive when honey is harvested. These wax caps become beeswax after they have been drained of the honey, washed in a double boiler, strained through layers of cheesecloth to remove debris and poured into a block mold for later use. For every 100 pounds of honey, approximately 1 or 2 pounds of beeswax are harvested.

=== Non-commercial production ===
Beeswax wrap can be made non-commercially with sheets of cotton and a mixture of beeswax, resin and oil. The cotton is cut into the makers desired shapes and the edges of the fabric are trimmed. A mixture of beeswax, pine resin, coconut and jojoba oil is melted. Then both sides of the cotton are coated with a thin layer of the melted mixture, ensuring that the wax is spread evenly and to the edges of the cotton. The coated cotton is then covered with wax paper and ironed; alternatively the fabric is placed on a baking tray and placed in an oven. The wrap is heated at approximately 200˚F or 93˚C. Once it is clear the wax has melted into the cotton, the fabric is left to air dry.

=== Commercial production ===
The mass production of beeswax wrap in commercial factories is yet to evolve due to the sustainability-centered visions of many beeswax wrap companies. Some companies have begun to use machinery that automatically waxes rolls of the fabric to upscale their production.

In 2018 UK innovation and technology-based consulting firm Cambridge Consultants partnered with UK based start-up BeeBee Wraps by Kamalakannan. They have designed a manufacturing process that enables production to increase by a factor of 30, while maintaining the sustainable values that guide the business.

== Environmental impact ==
=== Plastic pollution ===
Plastic pollution is the intrusion or invasion by plastic materials, either through direct introduction or degradation processes, of environments. As with other single-use non-recyclables, plastic food wrap ends up in landfill, as litter on land, or in the world's oceans. Plastic wrap takes years to decompose and leaches the chemicals it contains into the atmosphere and oceans. This poses a risk to wildlife as they may get caught up in it or eat it.

Beeswax wraps are a sustainable and reusable alternative to single-use plastics such as zip-lock bags and plastic food wrap. They have the potential to reduce the environmental impact of this plastic pollution problem.

Global production and consumption of single-use plastic has continued to rise for the past 50 years. According to the Ellen McArthur Foundation, 78 million tonnes of plastic were produced in 2013, a 4% increase from 2012, and with 40% of this ending up in landfill. More than 8 million tonnes of plastic end up in the world's oceans each year. Sunlight and the sea's motions can cause plastic to be broken down into microplastics. The presence of these plastics in oceans has detrimental effects on both marine life and human life.

Since the beginning of the twenty-first century, the trend towards sustainability has led to an increased awareness of the damage single-use plastic and other unsustainable practices may have on the environment. Companies have become more aware of their environmental impact and have allocated more resources to sustainability. Other companies have emerged that focus on providing sustainable alternatives for plastic.

=== Food wastage ===
Between 33-50% of all food produced globally is not eaten. This wastage has an economic value of over US$1 trillion. As food production is resource-intensive, food losses are accompanied by other environmental impacts, such as deforestation, water and air pollution and greenhouse gas emissions. Along the food production-consumption chain, households represent the largest food-waste faction. In the western world, over 50% of food waste occurs within the home. In 2018, Schanes, Dobernig and Gözet conducted a systematic review of household food waste practices and concluded that households face conflicts between good intentions to prevent food waste and preferences regarding taste, freshness, cleanliness and food safety.

Beeswax wrap's main use is food preservation within the home. Approximately 1.3 billion tonnes of food per year are wasted, creating both financial losses and causing significant harm to the environment and its natural resources. Beeswax wrap can reduce food waste as it is made from breathable materials that enable food to remain fresher for longer. Beeswax wrap has the potential to reduce food waste due to its anti-microbial properties that may prevent the spoilage of food products.

== Anti-microbial effects ==
The spoilage of food products caused by microbes is a concern for many sub-sectors of the food industry. An estimated 25% of the world's food is lost due to microorganism activity. Such food spoilage results in food wastage as products become unsuitable for consumption, causing large financial losses. Recent technological progression has led to the development of techniques targeted to prevent the activity and growth of food contaminating microbes.

The anti-microbial properties of food wrap containing beeswax are attributed to propolis. Propolis is a resin-like material made by bees from tree buds.

A 2017 study conducted by Pinto, Pankowski and Nano for the Journal of Microbiology, Biotechnology and Food Sciences discovered that beeswax wrap is capable of preventing the activity of microbes that contaminate food by inhibiting the viable cell count of bacteria. This implies that beeswax wrap can constrain the spread of food-borne bacterial pathogens and contribute to the prevention of food spoilage. Pinto, Pankowski and Nano investigated beeswax wrap's anti-microbial activity against bacteria, fungi and viruses. Food borne pathogens are found among each of these groups.

To detect the anti-bacterial activity of beeswax wrap they incubated the wrap with bacterial cells in a liquid phase. They used Salmonella enteritidis, a gram-negative bacterium, and Staphylococcus aureus, a gram-positive bacterium and common cause of stomach infections. Both bacteria were exposed to beeswax wrap. It was found that incubation with the beeswax wrap led to a decline in the number of both cells and a decline in bacterial activity.

To detect the anti-yeast activity of beeswax wraps two strains of Saccharomyces cerevsiae were incubated in a liquid phase with the beeswax wrap. A small decrease in cell count was noted. This decrease was not large enough to conclude that beeswax wrap reduces yeast-activity.

To determine the anti-viral capacity of beeswax wrap bacteriophages M13 and P1 were incubated in a liquid phase with the beeswax wrap. Results showed a decrease in the number of active phage particles. This decrease was not large enough to conclude that beeswax wrap has the ability to inactivate viral particles.

Pinto, Pankowski and Nano concluded that beeswax wrap has anti-bacterial properties, however they were unable to conclude that it had anti-fungal or anti-viral properties.

== Criticisms ==
Beeswax wrap has been criticized for its contributions to consumerist environmentalism. This solution to the plastic problem relies on individual responsibility. Measuring individuals in terms of responsibility ignores who and what has caused the most environmental damage and who is most vulnerable to future environmental hazards. Beeswax wraps are criticized for their high prices, when sold commercially, especially when compared to single-use plastics such as cling wrap. When compared to single-use plastics, beeswax wrap requires more maintenance to ensure it remains clean and safe to use and lasts over a longer period of time. Beeswax wrap is not pliable enough to get a complete seal which, when it comes to keeping food fresh, is an important factor.
