= Norse Projects =

Danish clothing brand

- Industry: Clothing
- Founded: 2004
- Headquarters: Copenhagen, Denmark
- Products: Menswear, womenswear, sunglasses
- Website: norseprojects.com

Norse Projects is a clothing brand based in Copenhagen, Denmark. The company designs and develops seasonal collections of men's and womenswear, blending influences from streetwear and classical workwear with high-end fashion. The creative director of the company is Tobia Sloth.

== History ==
Norse Projects was founded by Tobia Sloth, Anton Juul, and Mikkel Grønnebæk as a retail streetwear shop and art gallery in 2004. The company launched its own menswear line in 2009. In 2013, Norse Projects topped a list of the 15 best Scandinavian men's wear brands by Complex. The company introduced its inaugural womenswear collection for Fall/Winter 2015.

== Flagship store ==
Norse Projects has a flagship store in Kronprinsensgade 3 in central Copenhagen, with a curated selection of high-end Japanese brands on the first floor. The store also stocks a selection of art books, magazines and fanzines.
