= Ventile =

1995 trademark for fabrics used in waterproof clothing

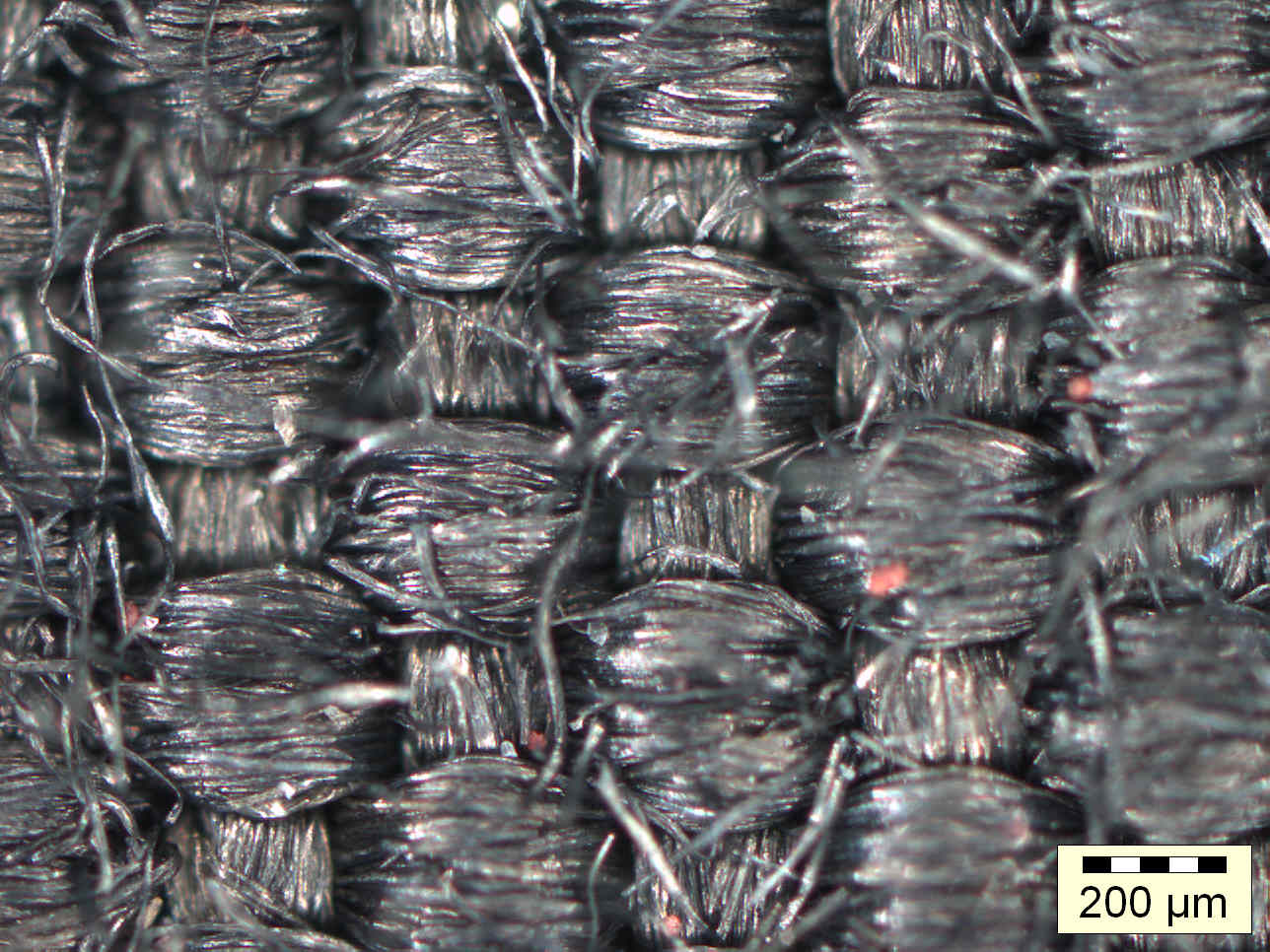
Cotton fibers of etaProof

Ventile is a high-quality textile made of cotton with a very close weave. Currently the only manufacturer of this specification of cotton textile is the Swiss firm Stotz & Co AG, which spins, twists, weaves and dyes the raw materials, and sells the textile directly under its own branding of etaProof.

== History ==
Ventile was first developed by scientists at the Shirley Institute in Manchester, England. Originally created to overcome a shortage of flax used for fire hoses and water buckets, its properties were also useful for pilots' immersion suits, but expensive and leaky if exposed to sweat or oils.

British production of Ventile eventually ended in the late 20th century but the trademark continued to be used by the British company Talbot Weaving (Chorley) Limited to market their wholesale distribution of etaProof cotton fabrics until 2017 when the trademark ownership was transferred to the manufacturer Stotz & Co AG. Alternative registered trademarks, owned by other commercial organisations used to market, promote or distribute the fabric, include Supermarine and Duuton3.

== Composition ==
Extra-long-staple (ELS) cotton fibres are used to form a low-twist yarn, which is then woven into a tight high-density textile to create a 100% cotton fabric, capable of providing an effective barrier against inclement weather. In wet weather the softly spun yarns - within the tight weave - dynamically expand to form an effective barrier against the elements.

Although weatherproof, it is not coated or laminated; the combination of a dense weave and the swelling of the fibres when wet provide excellent weatherproofing. ELS cotton fibres are only available from around 2% of the world's entire cotton crop, but due to their naturally long length this creates yarns of superior strength as they can be spun using an exceptionally low twist. The natural product offers a high level of comfort due to its drape and breathability, while being durable and quiet in use. It also has good resistance to tearing and burning. However, it is not as light in weight as synthetic fabrics, particularly when wet. While only fabrics scoring hydrostatic head measurements of 1000mm or more are technically considered to be fully waterproof, etaProof fabrics (200g to 270g standard versions) achieve measurements no less than 750mm. This is usually considered to be sufficient for reasonable protection against typical rain. The standard 300g version scores 900mm, and the UK Ministry of Defence considers a measurement of 800mm to be "waterproof". A common design feature of some Ventile overgarments uses two separate layers of the textile - with offset seams - to dramatically improve the garment's weatherproof protection. This is commonly called double-layer or twin-layer Ventile.

Fabric specifications (Ventile/etaProof)
	L35/145	L34/5640	L24/5620	L24RS/5620RS	L19/5610	L27/5635	L28/5630
Fabric weight(g/m^{2})	145	170	200	220	240	270	300
Threads/cm: warp	92	96	81		66	68	71
Threads/cm: weft	41	35	30		26		
Breaking strength: warp minimum(N/5 cm)	1000		1100	1200	1400	1200	1500
Breaking strength: weft minimum(N/5 cm)	650			750		1000	1400
Tear strength: warp minimum(g)	900		1200	1350	1800		2200
Tear strength: weft minimum(g)	650		750	800	1200	1600	
Impregnation of DWR	Dendrimer based (until 2021 was fluorocarbon-6)						
Water absorption(max. %)	10						
Resistance to water hydrostatic head(mm)	750			600	750		900
Oil repellency(rating)	5-6						

L24/5620 and L19/5610 are made also in Organic way, denominated 5620.1 RUC and 5610.1 RUC respectively, replacing the fluorocarbon of DWR with paraffin wax. With this change, three properties worsened: Water absorption changed from 10% to 15%, Resistance to water hydrostatic head changed from 750mm to 600mm and Oil repellency changed from 5–6 to 0.

== Applications ==
Fabrics made from the material are used in outerwear performance garments and have military, medical and workwear applications. The material was also used extensively in Antarctica in outerwear garments by the British Antarctic Survey.

Ventile is still used in military uniforms, especially for pilots flying over water. It is not often used in the United States, but in Europe, especially in the UK, it has had a revival with the bushcraft movement. It is popular with birdwatchers and naturalists because, unlike synthetic fabrics such as Gore-Tex, it is quiet in use. Alternative branding of the textile, such as Duuton3, is designed to promote less emphasis upon waterproofing and to disassociate itself from the reserve of military, vintage or bushcraft use and position its adoption more favourably amidst travel-wear, general outdoor sports and functional fashion as a practical cotton material with coincidental weatherproof characteristics.

== See also ==
- Cotton duck
- Grenfell Cloth
