= Breathability =

Ability of fabric to transfer moisture vapor

Breathability of fabric is the ability of a fabric to allow moisture vapor to be transmitted through the material.

== Mechanism ==
Air permeability is the ability of a fabric to allow air to pass through it. While air permeable fabrics tend to have relatively high moisture vapor transmission, it is not necessary to be air permeable to be breathable.

Moisture Vapor Transfer (MVT) in waterproof fabrics occurs by two processes:

- Physical: Hydrophobic (water fearing) are waterproof, yet steam permeable -microporous coatings or laminations have pores that are so small that liquid water cannot go through. However, vapor water molecules are many times smaller than the liquid state and can pass through these “micro pores”.
- Chemical: Hydrophilic (water loving) / non-porous lamination or coating move moisture by chemical diffusion. The water molecule is positively charged and the hydrophilic PU is negatively charged, attracting the water through the intermolecular gaps of the PU. Because the ionic bond is relatively weak, the water then gets pushed through the gaps until the water vapor passes all the way through.

Driving Force is the difference in the level of heat and humidity on one side of the material compared to the other side. Also known as the Differential Pressure. By the second law of thermodynamics moisture will move towards dry. Therefore, warm, moist air will flow towards cold, dry air until there is an equilibrium.

Due to body heat and moisture, there is almost always higher heat and humidity inside a clothing system. This creates a differential pressure forcing the heat and humidity toward the outside. The greater the difference between the heat and humidity inside the clothing system and the outside, the greater the Differential Pressure to push that heat and humidity out.

== Testing ==
=== Upright Cup test ===
Also known as JIS L 1099, JIS Z 0208, ISO 2528, Desiccant Method of ASTM E96, JIS K 6328 (JIS is short for Japanese Industry Standards). The A-1 method uses Calcium Chloride solution to simulate sweat while A-2 method uses just water. A desiccant, calcium chloride, is put into a cup. A piece of fabric is then secured over the cup and placed in a controlled environment. Then after period of time the cup is weighed to see how much water has been “pulled” into the cup through the fabric. The weight is then extrapolated to show the number of grams of sweat passing through a square meter fabric in 24 hours.

Range	Performance (g m^{−2} d^{−1})
Low	<4,000
Moderate	4,000 to 8,000
High	>9,000

Typical maximum with current technologies are in 15,000 range. High-performance fabrics may get A1 test scores in 10,000 to 15,000 g m^{−2} d^{−1} range and usually show that a fabric has a fairly quick release of moisture, but may not be the best over longer periods of use.

=== Inverted Cup ===
Also known as JIS L 1099 is similar to the ASTM E96-BW test method. A desiccant, potassium acetate, is put into a cup and sealed with a piece of ePTFE (Teflon/Stedfast/Gore-Tex film). The fabric to be tested is then placed over the cup with the fabric side to the cup.

The cup is then inverted into a pan of water. Then after period of time the cup is weighed to see how much water has been “pulled” into the cup through the fabric. The weight is then extrapolated to yield the number of grams of fluid passing through a square meter of fabric in 24 hours.

The B-1 variant of test method puts membrane in direct contact with water while B-2 variant adds an ePTFE film between the water and the fabric. While B-2 is a good test, it eliminates the effect of fabric when in direct contact with water. When sweat condenses on the inside of a fabric with a hydrophilic laminate, the lamination will actively pull the water through the fabric reducing condensation. This can be a tremendous addition to the comfort of the user. The B-2 test is also best used for non-waterproof fabrics, so the water in the pan does not pass directly through the uncoated fabric.

Range	Performance (g m^{−2} d^{−1})
Low	<10,000
Moderate	10,000 to 20,000
High	>20,000

Current upper range is 30,000 g m^{−2} d^{−1}.

=== Sweating Hot Plate ===
Also known as ISO – 11092 or the Ret or Hohenstein test. In this test, fabric is placed above a porous (sintered) metal plate. The plate is heated and water is channeled into the metal plate, simulating perspiration. The plate is then kept at a constant temperature. As water vapor passes through the plate and the fabric, it causes Evaporative Heat Loss and therefore more energy is needed to keep the plate at a constant temperature. R_{et} is the measurement of the resistance to evaporative heat loss. The lower the R_{et} value, the less resistance to moisture transfer and therefore higher breathability.

Hohenstein added a unique aspect to their testing. They had real people wear garments made with the fabrics of varying R_{et} values and work out on a treadmill. They gathered the comments of the testers and correlated this to the R_{et} values of the fabrics and came up with a Comfort Rating System.

Range	Performance
Ret 0-6	Very good or Extremely Breathable. Comfortable at higher activity rate.
Ret 6 to 13	Good or Very Breathable. Comfortable at moderate activity rate.
Ret 13 to 20	Satisfactory or Breathable. Uncomfortable at high activity rate.
Ret 20 to 30	Unsatisfactory or Slightly Breathable. Moderate comfort at low activity rate.
Ret 30+	Unsatisfactory or Not Breathable. Uncomfortable and short tolerance time.

The testers could not perceive a difference in the garments made with fabrics within these ranges. So, a garment made with a 40 Ret fabric and one made with 55 Ret fabric did not have a perceivable comfort difference in use.

=== Comparison of Test Methods ===
Ret, A1, B1 and B2 test results do not correlate with each other. Two fabrics may have a B1 of 10,000g, but one can be 10,000 A1 and the other 4,000 A1. It all depends on the type of coating or lamination and how it moves moisture. Typically hydrophobic coatings perform better than hydrophilic laminations on the Ret and A1 Test. And vice versa, the hydrophilic laminations will perform better on the B1 test.

== Technology Comparison ==
Below is very generalized positioning of technologies.

Technologies	Ret	B1	A1
Non-coated fabrics	2-4	25,000++	Not applicable
MemBrain, and Gore-Tex Pro 2L-3L, Toray Dermizax NX 3L	4-6	25,000+	4,000 - 8,000
Gore-Tex PacLite, Performance 2L, Entrant HB, PreCip Plus	6 – 8	15,000+	8,000 – 15,000+
Gore-Tex Performance 3L, PreCip, MemBrain 10, Entrant GII	7 - 10	10 – 15,000	5,000 – 12,000
Windstopper Softshell, Low end Entrant, most Softshells with film	8 - 13	6 – 10,000	Not applicable

== Applications ==
Breathable textiles are widely used in:

=== Sportswear Purpose ===
Sources:

- reduce sweat accumulation
- improve cooling during exercise

=== Outdoor clothing ===
Examples:

- hiking jackets
- ski clothing
- rain shells

Requirements:

- waterproofing
- wind resistance
- vapor transport

=== Medical textiles ===
Examples:

- wound dressings
- protective clothing

Requirements:

- moisture control
- skin comfort

=== Bedding and home textiles ===
Breathability influences:

- sleep temperature regulation
- moisture comfort
- perceived softness

== See also ==
- Breathing
- Membrane
- Moisture vapor transmission rate
