= Durable water repellent =

Fabric finish

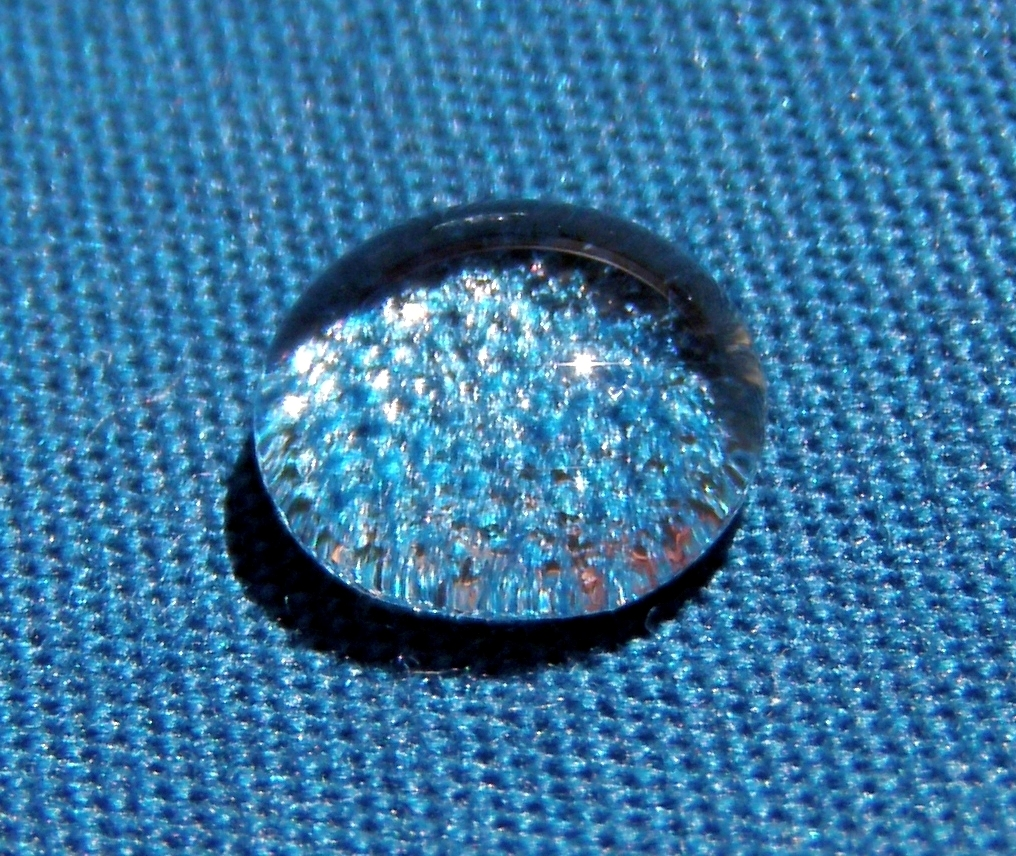
Fluorine-containing durable water repellent makes a fabric water-resistant.

Durable water repellent, or DWR, is a coating or finish added to fabrics at the factory to make them water-resistant (hydrophobic). Most factory-applied treatments are fluoropolymer based. Durable water repellents are commonly used in conjunction with waterproof breathable fabrics such as Gore-Tex to prevent the outer layer of fabric from becoming saturated with water. This saturation, called 'wetting out,' can reduce the garment's breathability (moisture transport through the breathable membrane) and let water through. As the DWR wears off over time, re-treatment is recommended when necessary. Many spray-on and wash-in products for treatment of non-waterproof garments and re-treatment of proofed garments losing their water-repellency are available.

Methods for factory application of DWR treatments involve applying a solution of a chemical onto the surface of the fabric by spraying or dipping, or chemical vapor deposition (CVD). The advantages of CVD include reducing the use of environmentally harmful solvents; requiring less DWR; and an extremely thin waterproof layer that has less effect on the natural look and feel of the fabric.

Some researchers have suggested that the use of PFAS in water-repellent clothing is over-engineering, and comparable performance can be achieved using specific silicon- and hydrocarbon-based finishes.

== Re-treating garments ==
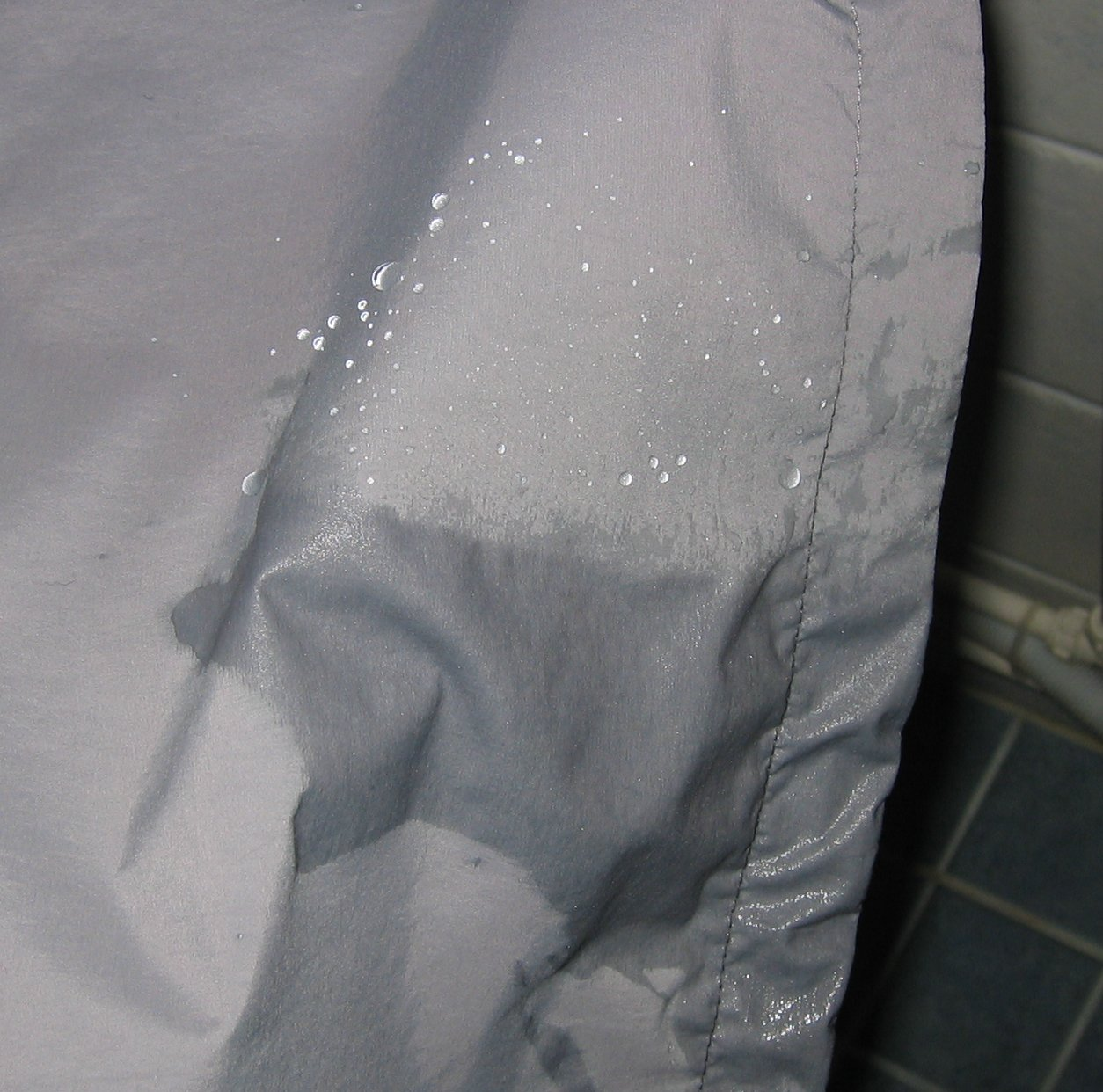
Top part of the fabric has been ironed after re treatment washing and this heat application has revitalized the repellency of water. Bottom part of the fabric has not been ironed after re treatment washing and the water is still wetting out the fabric.

Certain types of fabrics need to be re-treated to maintain water-repellency, as fluoropolymers decompose over time when exposed to water and chemicals. Washing the garment with harsh detergents usually accelerates DWR loss; in addition, soaps often leave a residue which attracts water and dirt. On the other hand, rain water or salt water affects DWRs less significantly. Affected garments can be treated with a 'spray-on' or 'wash-in' treatment to improve water-repellency. In some cases heat treatment can reactivate the factory applied repellent finish and aid in the repelling of water, and other liquids such as oils. On the other hand, some DWR products do not require heat treatment to be activated, and sometimes DWR treatments can be revitalized simply by washing the fabric with a suitable cleaner.

== Cravenette ==
Cravenette was an old process to make cloths water-repellent. It was a performance finish that repelled water. Various U.S.-based suppliers, such as A. Murphy, W.G. Hitchcock, and H. Herrmann, were offering Cravenette-treated cloths in the early 20th century.

== See also ==
- Finishing (textiles)
- P2i
- Perfluorobutanesulfonic acid
- Perfluorooctanoic acid
- Scotchgard
