= Belinda Chang =

Belinda Chang may refer to:

- Belinda Chang (author) (born 1963), Chinese-language author from Taiwan
- Belinda Chang (biologist), American-Canadian evolutionary and molecular biologist
- Belinda Chang (sommelier), American sommelier, writer, and restaurateur

== See also ==
- Chang (surname)
