= Belinda Chang (sommelier) =

American sommelier, writer and restaurateur

Belinda Chang is a James Beard Award winning American sommelier, writer, and restaurateur. Chang has been the wine and service director for multiple critically acclaimed restaurants in Chicago, San Francisco, and New York City. She has authored wine notes for several cookbooks, including Charlie Trotter’s Meat and Game, and as a host on the Fine Living Network.

== Education and early career ==
She attended Rice University, in Houston, Texas. While pursuing a degree in biochemistry, Chang became the headwaiter at Rice University’s faculty club, Cohen House, and staged in the kitchen at Café Annie, making her way from the kitchen to the dining room, becoming the only woman captain. Upon spotting an issue of Wine Spectator naming Charlie Trotter’s as the Best Dining Experience, Combining Food and Wine, she put her pre-med aspirations aside and moved back to Chicago in order to pursue her career in restaurants, beginning at Charlie Trotter’s.

== Career ==
At the Wine Spectator Grand Award-winning restaurant, Charlie Trotter's, Belinda worked as a sommelier in the wine program led by Joseph Spellman and then ascended to Wine Director. In 2002, Chang accepted the positions of General Manager and Wine Director at Laurent Gras’ The Fifth Floor and moved to San Francisco. There, she received her first James Beard Award nomination for wine service and was hailed as Critic’s Choice for Wine Director of the Year by San Francisco Magazine. She was offered the position of Wine and Service Director at Lettuce Entertain You’s Osteria Via Stato, and returned to Chicago once again to work under Lettuce Entertain You Founder, Rich Melman and executive chef Rick Tramonto. Later, she joined Tramonto's team at Cenitare and was their corporate director of wine and spirits. Chang took a position at Danny Meyer's The Modern in 2007, located in New York City's Museum of Modern Art, and after winning a James Beard Award for Outstanding Wine Service in 2011, she left The Modern to become the GM and wine director of The Monkey Bar under Graydon Carter, Jeff Klein and Ken Friedman. Next, she was named Beverage Director of Culinary Concepts by Jean-Georges, creating wine and beverage programs, and mentoring sommeliers and bartenders at 18 different hotels worldwide. Following her success in the corporate world, she began working for the LVMH Moet Hennessy portfolio, as an educator for thousands of consumers and trade alike, about the five Champagne maisons in the LVMH Moet Hennessy portfolio. In 2015, Chang returned to Chicago once more to open and manage Maple & Ash a steakhouse where she was managing partner until 2017. She currently runs her own marketing firm

== Personal life ==
Chang resides in Chicago, Illinois.
