= Gale Gand =

American chef and TV personality

- Born: November 21, 1956 (age 69); Evanston, Illinois
- Education: B.F.A. from Rochester Institute of Technology awarded 1981, La Varenne summers of 1982 and 1983
- Culinary career
- Cooking style: Contemporary American cuisine
- Previous restaurant(s): Gotham Bar and Grill, Jams, Bella Luna, Trio, Brasserie T, Vanilla Bean Bakery, Tru, Osteria di Tramonto, Tramonto's Steak & Seafood, RT Lounge, Gale's Coffee Bar, Spritzburger
- Television show: Sweet Dreams
- Award(s) won: Food & Wine Magazine 's Top Ten Best New Chefs, 1994; "Pastry Chef of the Year", The James Beard Foundation, 2001; "Outstanding Pastry Chef of the Year", Bon Appetit Magazine, 2001
- Website: http://www.galegand.com

Gale Gand is a Chicago-based pastry chef, cookbook author, television personality, and winner of the 2001 James Beard Foundation Award for Outstanding Pastry Chef. Gand was the host of the Food Network show Sweet Dreams. She was the Chef-in-Residence at Elawa Farm, in Lake Forest, Illinois. Gand is a partner and was the founding Executive Pastry Chef at Tru, a contemporary fine-dining restaurant affiliated with Lettuce Entertain You Enterprises. Gand and her partners at Tru won the 2007 James Beard Foundation Award for Service. She has blogged for the Huffington Post, was a contestant on Iron Chef America in the 2006–2007 season, and was a judge on Bravo's Top Chef in 2008 for the episode Wedding Wars. Gand was on the Great Chefs television program.

== Biography ==
A native of Deerfield, Illinois, Gand began her restaurant career in 1976 working as a line cook and waitress in Cleveland, Ohio, and then as a pastry chef in Rochester, New York. She later did pastry in New York City at The Gotham Bar and Grill and in England at Stapleford Park.

In 1993, Gand opened Trio with culinary partner and ex-husband Rick Tramonto and Henry Adaniya in Evanston, Illinois and was named among Food and Wine Magazine's Top Ten Best New Chefs in 1994. In 1999, she opened Tru with Tramonto and Lettuce Entertain You Enterprises's Rich Melman. The following year she started making Gale's Root Beer, a cinnamon ginger vanilla flavored artisanal soda pop, producing 60,000 bottles a year which sells nationally.

In 1996, Gand was chosen by Julia Child to appear on two episodes of the PBS show Baking with Julia.

Gand was the host of the Food Network show Sweet Dreams that ran on the network from 2000 to 2008. She got the show without a try out when calling the network to confirm a date to be on Sarah Moulton's show where she was a frequent guest chef.

On July 30, 2006, Gale Gand and ex-husband Rick Tramonto appeared on Iron Chef: America, losing to Mario Batali (53 - 46).

In 2014, she partnered with Steve McDonagh and Dan Smith (The Hearty Boys) to open SpritzBurger, a 2-year "pop-up" in Chicago.

In 2014, Gand was inducted into the Chicago Chef's Hall of Fame. She was also inducted into the American Academy of Chefs in 2018.

In 2016, Gand and other chefs, such as Laurent Gras and Matt Troost, collaborated with turkey and beef jerky producer, Think Jerky, creating signature jerky products. Some of Gand's creations included "Sriracha Honey Turkey Jerky," "Original Turkey Sticks," "Mini Original Turkey Sticks," and "Sesame Teriyaki Beef Jerky."

== Books ==
- Tramonto, Rick, and Gale Gand. 1997. American Brasserie. New York: Wiley.
- Gand, Gale, Rick Tramonto, and Julia Moskin. 1999. Butter Sugar Flour Eggs: Whimsical Irresistible Desserts. New York: Clarkson Potter.
- Gand, Gale and Julia Moskin. 2001. Gale Gand's Just a Bite: 125 Luscious Little Desserts. New York: Clarkson Potter.
- Gand, Gale and Julia Moskin. 2004. Gale Gand's Short and Sweet: Quick Desserts with Eight Ingredients or Less. New York: Clarkson Potter.
- Tramonto, Rick, Gale Gand, and Mary Goodbody. 2004. Tru: A Cookbook from the Legendary Chicago Restaurant. New York: Random House.
- Gand, Gale and Lisa Weiss. 2006. Chocolate and Vanilla. New York: Clarkson Potter.
- Gand, Gale, with Christie Matheson. 2009. Gale Gand's Brunch!: 100 Fantastic Recipes for the Weekend's Best Meal. New York: Clarkson Potter.
- Gand, Gale, with Christie Matheson. 2014. Gale Gand's Lunch!. New York: Houghton Mifflin Harcourt.
