= Maggiano's Little Italy =

American casual dining restaurant chain

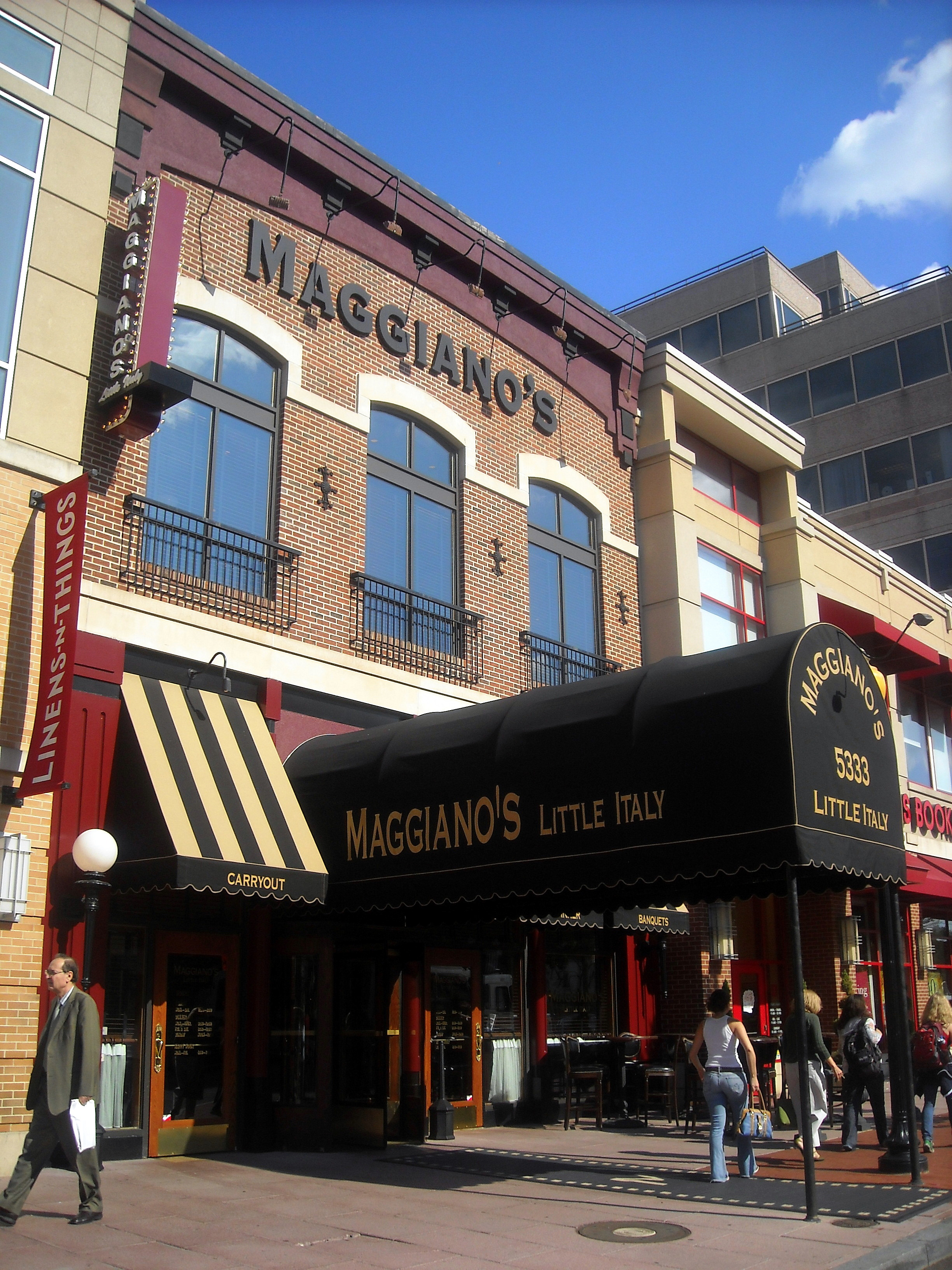
- A Maggiano's in Washington, D.C.
- Type: Subsidiary
- Industry: Restaurant
- Genre: Casual dining
- Founded: 1991; 35 years ago
- Headquarters: 3000 Olympus Blvd; Dallas, Texas, U.S. 75019
- Number of locations: 52 (2015)
- Key people: Steve D. Provost (president)
- Products: Italian-American cuisine (pasta • salad • seafood)
- Parent: Brinker International
- Website: maggianos.com

Maggiano's Little Italy (Italian: [madˈdʒaːno]) is an American casual dining restaurant chain specializing in Italian-American cuisine. The company was founded in Chicago's River North neighborhood, at Clark Street and Grand Avenue, in 1991 by Rich Melman's Lettuce Entertain You Enterprises (LEYE). The concept was acquired by Brinker International, Inc. in August 1995 from LEYE. As of March 22, 2021, there were 54 locations throughout 22 states and the District of Columbia.

== History ==
Richard Melman expanded LEYE's Italian division in 1991 by opening Maggiano's Little Italy in Chicago. According to the company's history, the concept aimed at "re-creating the classic pre-World War II dinner house featuring family size portions". Melman named the restaurant after Marvin Magid, his business partner who was killed in a helicopter crash in 1987.

The first restaurant opened on November 11, 1991, in Chicago at the corner of Clark Street and Grand Avenue in the River North neighborhood. A second restaurant was opened in Oak Brook, followed by one in Skokie. In 1994, the brand opened its first restaurant outside of Illinois. In 1995, Brinker International purchased the restaurant to take it national.

== See also ==
- List of Italian restaurants
