= Tru (restaurant) =

Coordinates: 41°53′40″N 87°37′23″W

- Interactive map of Tru

Restaurant information
- Established: 1999; 27 years ago
- Closed: October 7, 2017; 8 years ago
- Head chef: Anthony Martin
- Food type: Progressive French cuisine with American influences
- Dress code: Jacket required
- Rating: (Michelin Guide)
- Location: Chicago, Illinois, United States
- Website: trurestaurant.com

Tru was a French restaurant located in the Streeterville neighborhood in Chicago. Tru was opened in 1999 by Rick Tramonto and Gale Gand with the backing of Rich Melman's Lettuce Entertain You Enterprises. It was a Michelin one-star restaurant since the Chicago guidebook's inception in 2011; in 2017 the restaurant was awarded two Michelin stars. Since 2008, the Executive Chef was Anthony Martin. The restaurant closed on October 7, 2017.

== Awards and accolades ==
The restaurant received a Michelin Star from the Michelin Guide every year since Chicago's debut guide in 2011, and two Michelin stars in 2017. In 2013, Tru was once again awarded 5 diamonds from the American Automobile Association. Since 2004, the restaurant has been a recipient of the Wine Spectator Grand Award.

On September 5, 2017, Lettuce Entertain You Enterprises announced Tru would be serving its last service on Saturday, October 7, 2017.

== See also ==
- List of French restaurants
- List of Michelin-starred restaurants in Chicago
