= Beatrix (restaurant) =

Restaurant chain in the Chicago metropolitan area, Illinois, U.S.

- Interior of the River North location, 2026

Restaurant information
- Owner: Lettuce Entertain You Enterprises
- Food type: American
- Location: Illinois, United States
- Website: beatrixrestaurants.com

Beatrix is a small chain of restaurants in the Chicago metropolitan area, in the U.S. state of Illinois. The business is operated by Lettuce Entertain You Enterprises. There are locations in River North, Streeterville, and the West Loop.

== Description ==
Beatrix is a small chain of restaurants and coffee shops serving American cuisine. Menu options include hummus and naan, deviled eggs with potato salad, and salmon. The Caesar salad has fried capers instead of croutons. The restaurant has also served a tomato gazpacho, tsukune, and a pot roast sandwich. The breakfast menu includes quinoa cakes, oatmeal, and chia pudding, as well as graham crackers, butterscotch sticky buns, and other pastries. Among drink options are an espresso martini and a juice blended from celery, kale, mint, pineapple, and romaine lettuce.

== History and locations ==
Exterior of the RIver North location in 2026

A Beatrix Market opened at 155 N. Wacker Drive in the Loop in 2017. Another location opened at 23 E. Jackson Boulevard in 2018. In 2018, the restaurant announced plans to open in the suburb of Oak Brook.

In 2019, Beatrix announced plans to open a location in Disney Springs at Walt Disney World Resort in Florida. The project was cancelled in 2021.

In 2020, during the COVID-19 pandemic, the Streeterville location offered Bloody Mary kits.

A worker at the River North location was named "America's Best Dishwasher" by Plate Magazine in 2025.

== Reception ==
Time Out rated the restaurant four out of five stars in 2013. The Rough Guide has said Beatrix "does breakfast, lunch and dinner quite well".

== See also ==
- List of restaurant chains in the United States
