= Belinda Chang (biologist) =

Evolutionary and molecular biologist

Belinda S.W. Chang
- Education: Princeton University (A.B.); Harvard University (Ph.D.)
- Scientific career
- Workplaces: Harvard University; Rockefeller University; University of Toronto
- Thesis: Comparative studies of opsin structure and function: the evolution of wavelength regulation (1995)
- Doctoral advisors: Naomi Pierce; Richard Lewontin
- Website: chang.eeb.utoronto.ca

Belinda Siew-Woon Chang is an American-Canadian evolutionary and molecular biologist. She is currently a professor in the Department of Ecology and Evolutionary Biology and the Department of Cell and Systems Biology at the University of Toronto. Chang was also a Canada Research Chair in Comparative Evolutionary Neurobiology from 2003 to 2013. Her research is focused on the molecular evolution of proteins involved in vision, especially visual opsins, in vertebrates. Chang is known for reconstructing several extinct ancestral proteins, including the rhodopsins of the ancestral archosaur and the ancestral cetacean.

== Education ==
In 1988, Chang received an A.B. in biology from Princeton University; she graduated magna cum laude and was a member of Phi Beta Kappa. In 1995, she received a Ph.D. in neuroscience from Harvard University, where she was a student of evolutionary biologists Naomi Pierce and Richard Lewontin. She then completed postdoctoral fellowships at Harvard with Michael Donoghue in 1999 and at Rockefeller University with Thomas Sakmar in 2002, before accepting a faculty position at the University of Toronto in 2003.

== Research and career ==
In 2002, while a postdoctoral researcher at Rockefeller, Chang and her colleagues reconstructed the rhodopsin of the ancestral archosaur, the most recent common ancestor of dinosaurs (including birds) and crocodilians. They achieved this by inferring the sequence of the ancestral rhodopsin gene using maximum likelihood methods and then synthesizing and expressing the resulting protein in vitro. They found that the reconstructed rhodopsin was fully functional and could activate the retinal G protein transducin at a rate similar to that of a mammalian rhodopsin, suggesting that the ancestral archosaur may have been nocturnal. Chang's work attracted media attention, with writer Dan Eatherley commenting in New Scientist that "the gates to Jurassic Park have opened a little wider".

In 2022, Chang's team at the University of Toronto reconstructed the rhodopsin of the common ancestor of cetaceans (whales, dolphins, and porpoises) as well as that of the common ancestor of Whippomorpha (cetaceans and hippopotamuses). The blue-shifted absorption spectrum and accelerated retinal release rate of their reconstructed ancestral cetacean rhodopsin indicated that the common ancestor of cetaceans could dive deep into the mesopelagic zone, more than 200 metres underwater. Chang's findings contradicted previous assumptions that early cetaceans remained close to the surface.

The South American electric fish species Brachyhypopomus belindae was named in honour of Chang in 2016.
