= The Magic Pan =

American fast-food and take-away chain

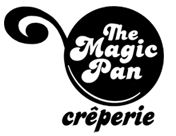
The Magic Pan logo, ca 1970s

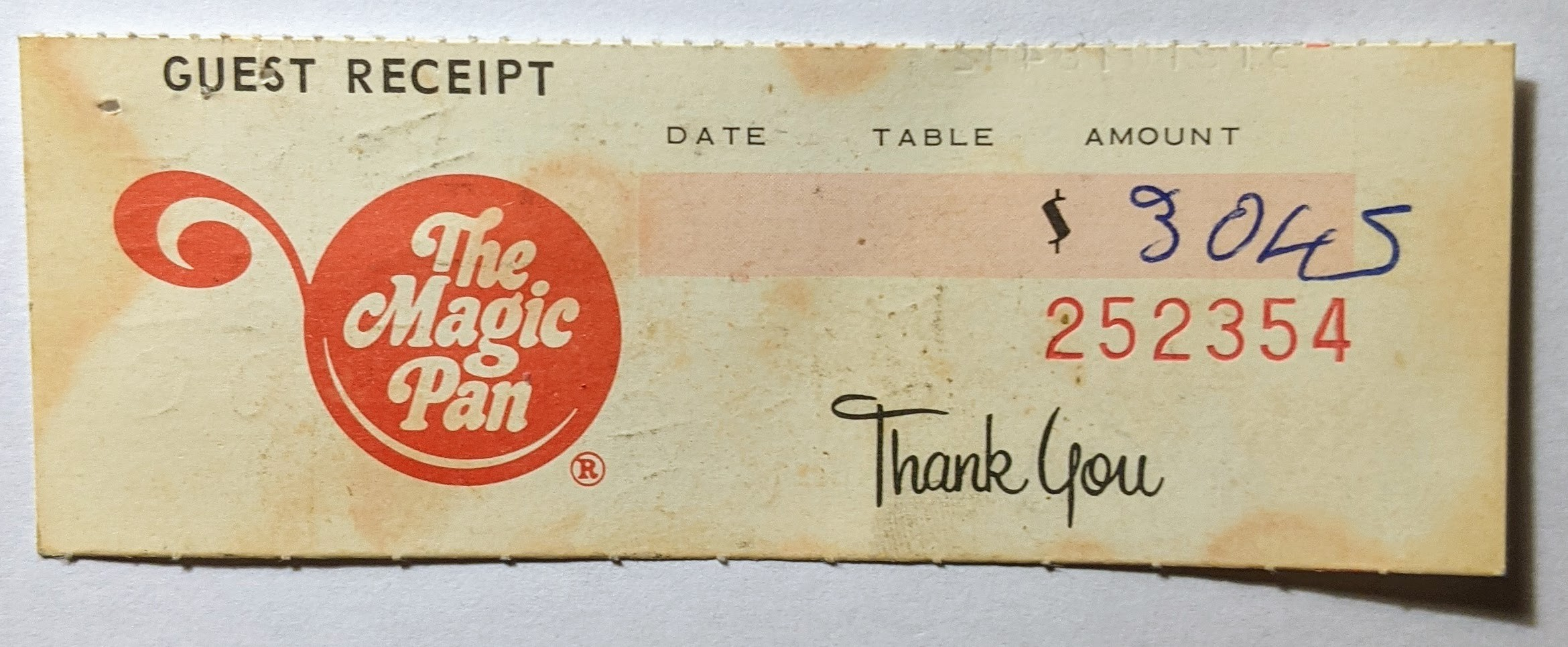
Guest Receipt from 1975

The Magic Pan is a small American chain of fast-food and take-away creperies using the recipes of a now-closed chain of full-service restaurants that specialized in crêpes, popular in the early 1970s through early 1990s, which peaked at 110 Magic Pan locations throughout the United States and Canada.

The restaurant took its name from the motorized device with individual pans used to make crepes, designed and patented by owner Laszlo Fono. A "carousel" held eight pans and turned them over a gas flame. An attendant dipped pans into crepe batter, then turned them upside down and placed them on the carousel, so the thin crepes cooked on the bottom of a clean greased pan facing upward.

== History ==
The first Magic Pan was established by refugees former skiing champion Laszlo Fono and Eva Paulette (Belatini) Fono in 1965 (61 years ago) in a small storefront on Fillmore Street in San Francisco, less than a decade after the couple escaped from Hungary on foot. Two years later, they opened a larger venue in Ghirardelli Square.

The Quaker Oats Company acquired Magic Pan from the Fonos in 1970, and it became the company's primary restaurant chain. Quaker Oats sold the company to an Oakland, California-based company, Bay Bottlers, in 1982.

In 2005, the Magic Pan name was re-introduced by Lettuce Entertain You Enterprises as a fast-food crepe stand in Northbrook, Illinois. This resurrected version of Magic Pan does not have the crepe-making machine used in the original chain. Instead, it uses recreations of the original recipes. The revived chain opened a second location in the food court of the Mall of America near Minneapolis, Minnesota. The Paradies company currently operates Magic Pan in U.S. airports including Denver and Washington National.

== Food ==
The recipes were based on the palacsintas (stuffed blini) Paulette remembered from her childhood in Budapest. Among the menu items were crêpes filled with chicken divan, "chicken elegante", burgundy beef, ratatouille, spinach and mushroom soufflé, dessert crepes with strawberries and sour cream, Chantilly cream, coffee/chocolate sauce ice cream, and "cherry royale." Gulyas (goulash), pea soup, and salads were also offered.
