= Paris Las Vegas =

Casino hotel in Paradise, Nevada, U.S.

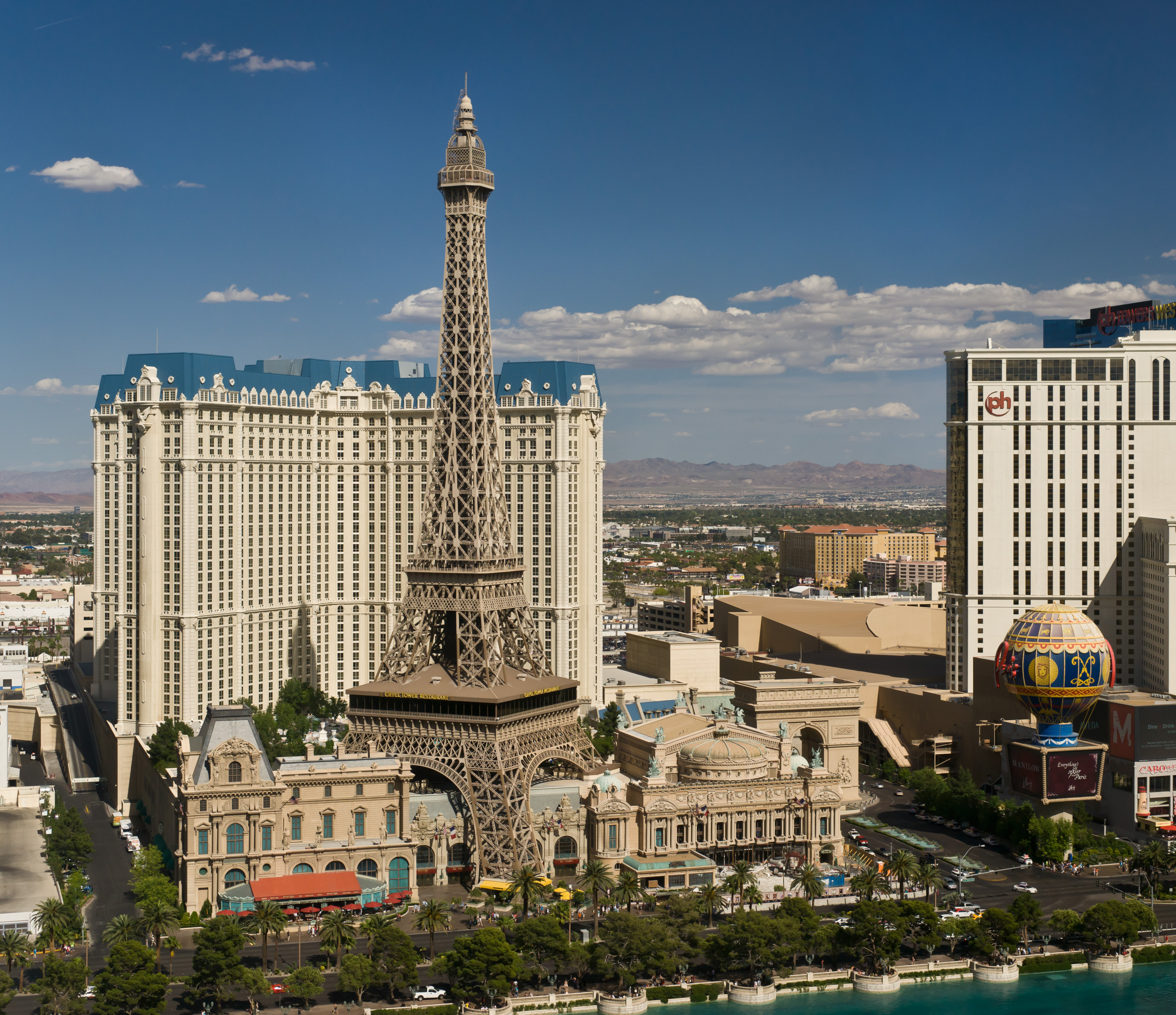
- Paris Las Vegas in 2010

- Location within Las Vegas Strip Location within Nevada
- Interactive map of Paris Las Vegas
- Location: Paradise, Nevada, U.S.; 3655 South Las Vegas Boulevard; 36.1125°N 115.1722°W
- Opened: September 1, 1999; 27 years ago
- Theme: Paris, France
- No. of rooms: 3,672
- Gaming space: 95,263 sq ft (8,850.2 m^{2})
- Signature attractions: Eiffel Tower replica
- Notable restaurants: Eiffel Tower Restaurant; Mon Ami Gabi; Gordon Ramsay Steak; Vanderpump à Paris; Nobu; Bedford
- Owner: Caesars Entertainment
- Renovated in: 2011, 2019, 2022–24
- Website: parislasvegas.com

Paris Las Vegas is a casino hotel on the Las Vegas Strip in Paradise, Nevada, United States. It is owned and operated by Caesars Entertainment. Property features include a 95,263-square-foot (8,850.2 m^{2}) casino, 3,672 hotel rooms, a 1,400-seat performance theater, and various restaurants. The Paris-themed resort also includes a half-scale replica of the Eiffel Tower, rising 540 feet (164.6 m). Replicas of other Paris landmarks are featured as well, including the Arc de Triomphe, the Louvre, the Paris Opera House, and the Musée d'Orsay.

Construction of Paris Las Vegas began on April 18, 1997, and the resort opened on September 1, 1999. It is located on 24 acres (9.7 ha), directly south of the Horseshoe Las Vegas resort, also owned by Caesars. In 2024, one of the Horseshoe hotel towers was renovated to become part of Paris, which previously had 2,916 rooms.

== History ==
The site of Paris Las Vegas was originally occupied by the Galaxy Motel and a small strip mall; the latter had included the Little Caesar's casino and a stand-alone sports book known as Churchill Downs. Bally Entertainment announced the Paris resort project on May 16, 1995. It was initially set to begin construction later that year, with the opening expected for late 1997. It would be built on 24 acres (9.7 ha) just south of the company's Bally's Las Vegas resort.

Chanen Construction, based in Phoenix, Arizona, was hired as construction manager. However, Hilton acquired Bally Entertainment in late 1996, and Chanen was fired from the Paris project amid the ownership change. Construction of Paris Las Vegas eventually began on April 18, 1997, with Perini Building Company as the general contractor. In 1998, Hilton transferred ownership of its gaming properties – including Paris and Bally's – to Park Place Entertainment, a corporate spin-off which would be renamed Caesars Entertainment in 2003.

Paris Las Vegas opened on September 1, 1999, following a private VIP party which included Nevada governor Kenny Guinn, Las Vegas mayor Oscar Goodman, French actress Catherine Deneuve, and businessman Donald Trump. Paris Las Vegas employed 4,200 workers. The resort project cost $785 million. Unlike high-end resorts opening on the Strip around the same time, Paris targeted a middle-class clientele.

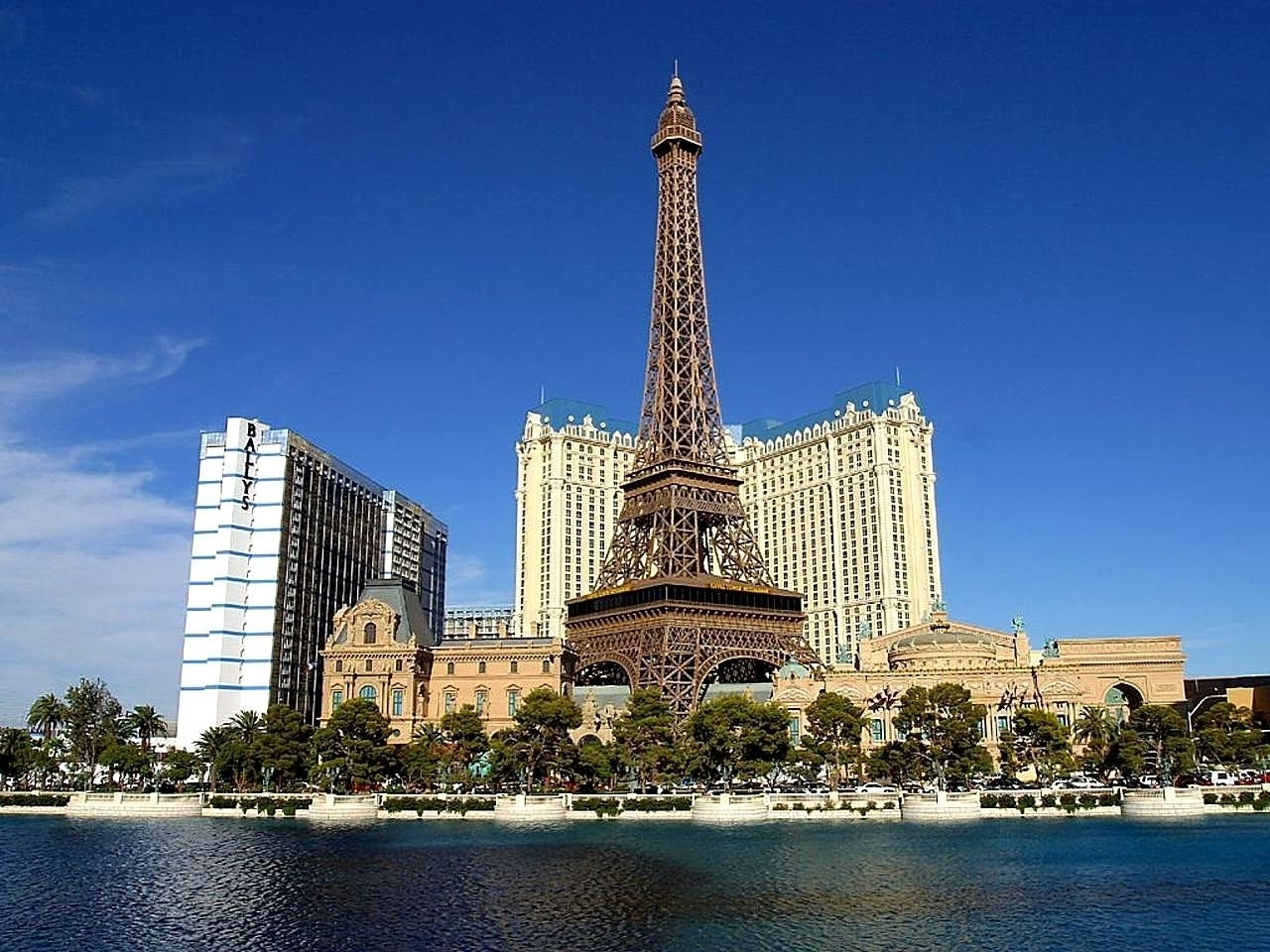
Bally's Jubilee Tower (left), before it became part of Paris (right)

Paris was built as a sister property to Bally's. The two resorts are connected, and initially shared operations, including a single gaming license and hotel reservation system.

In late 1999, Steven Mattes, a high roller who gambled there during its opening weekend, filed a fraud lawsuit against the resort. Mattes accused the casino of reneging on an agreement to provide him with a $2 million line of credit. A jury ruled in his favor in 2002, awarding him $8 million. However, the verdict was challenged by the resort and ruled erroneous in 2003. The case was summarily dismissed the following year. Mattes appealed the case to the U.S. Supreme Court, which declined to hear it in 2007.

In 2001, the resort's performance theater hosted the first BET Awards show.

The Flag of France had hung from the resort's exterior since opening, but was briefly removed in 2003, amid France's opposition to the invasion of Iraq.

Harrah's Entertainment acquired Caesars Entertainment in 2005 and took on the latter's name in 2010.

A power outage occurred in November 2016, lasting more than 12 hours and trapping 11 people in elevators throughout the resort, before being rescued by fire crews. A work crew had been making floor repairs in the resort's boiler room and accidentally drilled into the property's main power and backup generator lines, causing the outage. Another outage occurred in October 2020, after rodents interfered with an off-site transfer switch near the resort. Six people had to be rescued from elevators, and power was restored within three hours.

In 2022, Paris and Bally's became the first Strip resorts to host the World Series of Poker, which returned to the resorts for 2023 as well.

== Design ==
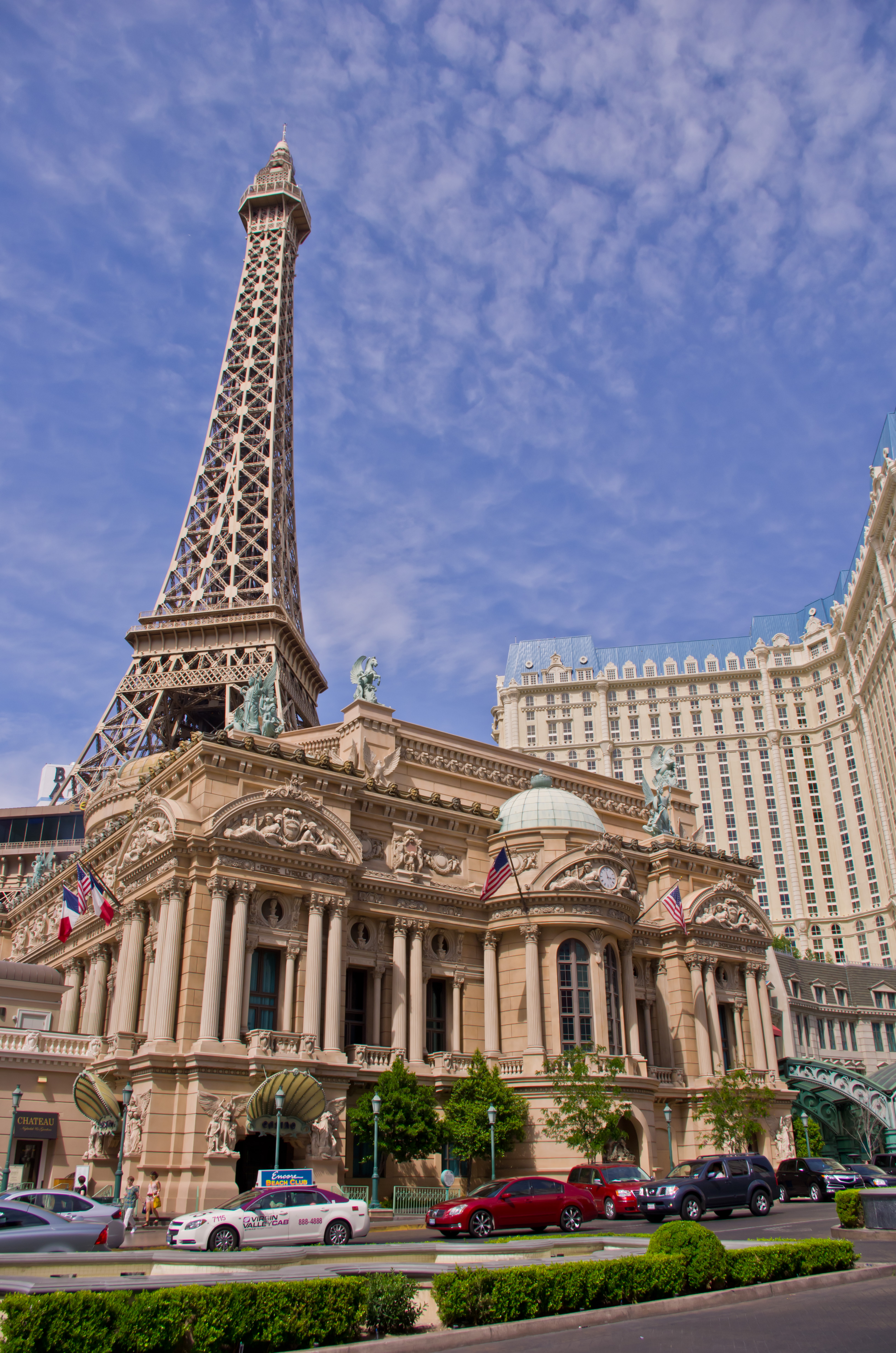
Replicas of the Eiffel Tower and Paris Opera House

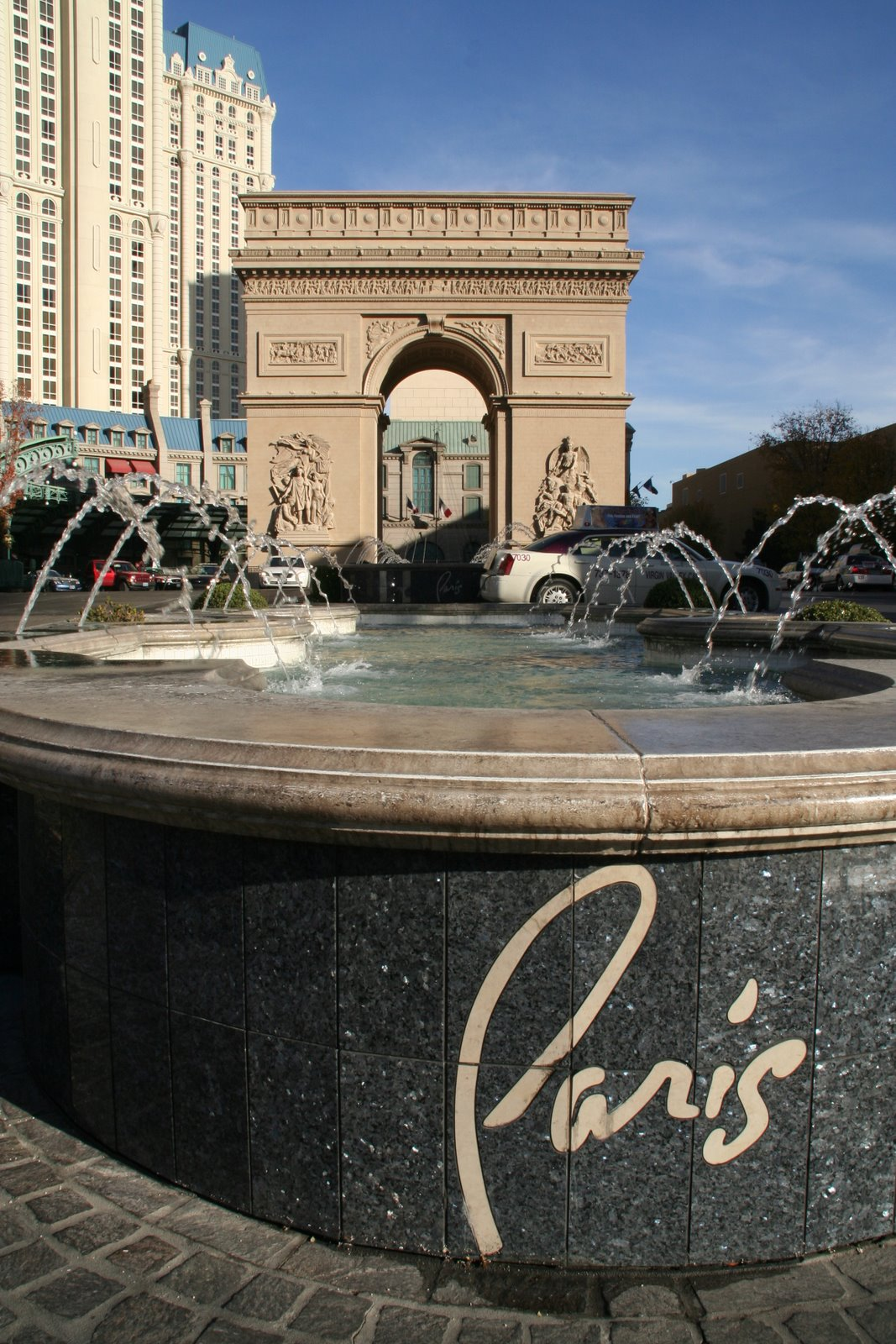
Replica of the Arc de Triomphe

Paris Las Vegas was designed by architect Joel Bergman. The Paris-themed facade along the Strip was created by Keenan Hopkins Suder & Stowell Contractors Inc. According to Dave Suder, "Paris Las Vegas was not intended to be a true, historical recreation of the real buildings in Paris, France. Everything was stylized, sized and proportioned to fit the project. But, the actual detail that went into the work is very detailed. The sculpted elements were carefully executed." The facade includes replicas of the Arc de Triomphe (two-thirds scale), the Louvre, the Paris Opera House, and the Musée d'Orsay. The designers traveled to France to study these landmarks.

The resort's half-scale Eiffel Tower replica rises 540 ft (160 m), with an observation deck at 460 ft (140 m), capable of holding up to 96 people. The tower also includes a restaurant, situated 11 stories above ground. The tower's legs measure 27 sq ft (2.5 m^{2}) at their base, and three of them rest within the casino floor. Upon the resort's opening, the three interior legs contained a sports book, a casino host area, and a bar, respectively. The fourth leg rests outside the resort along the Strip, and initially served as a ticket booth for guests to visit the observation deck.

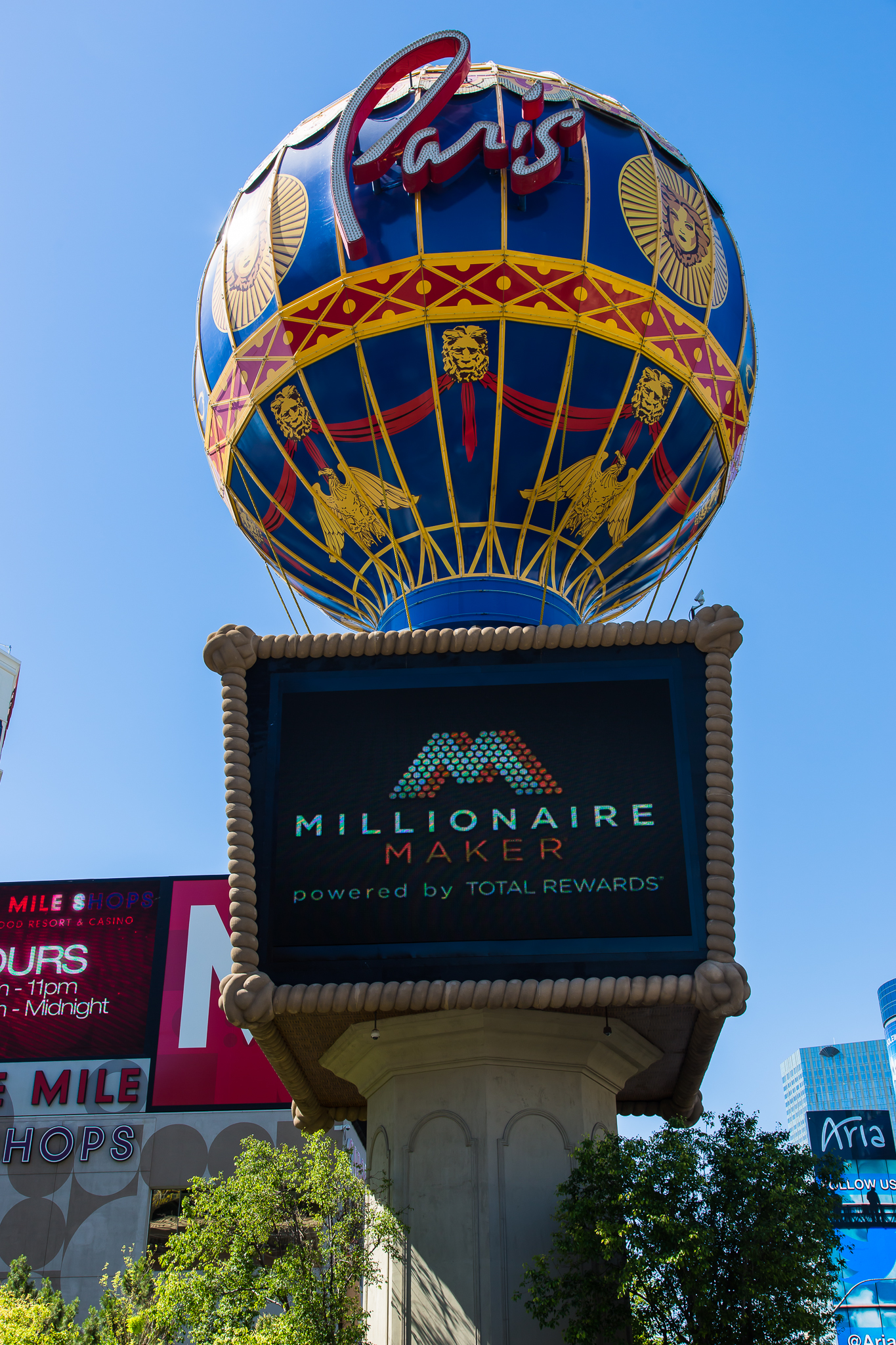
Montgolfier balloon sign

Bergman consulted Gustave Eiffel's blueprints for the original Eiffel Tower. His firm created the replica's architectural design, while its structural design came from the Las Vegas-based Martin & Peltyn. It was built by Schuff Steel, based in Phoenix, using 5,000 tons of steel. Although the replica tower was created with welded steel, it also includes faux rivets to match the design of the original.

Interior design of the resort's public spaces was handled by Yates-Silverman, with assistance from Kovacs & Associates of Chicago. The interior was inspired by the Paris street scene of the 1920s, and includes restaurants and shops located in a recreation of the Rue de la Paix shopping district. The casino floor also features a replica of the Pont Alexandre III bridge.

The resort's main sign along the Strip depicts a Montgolfier hot-air balloon, with a diameter of 75 feet (23 m). The $6 million sign, rising 150 feet (46 m), was designed by Bergman and built by Las Vegas-based Federal Signs.

Paris mayor Jean Tiberi was impressed with the project's size and design. However, some French residents expressed pessimism about the project, stating that Paris could not be adequately recreated.

== Features ==
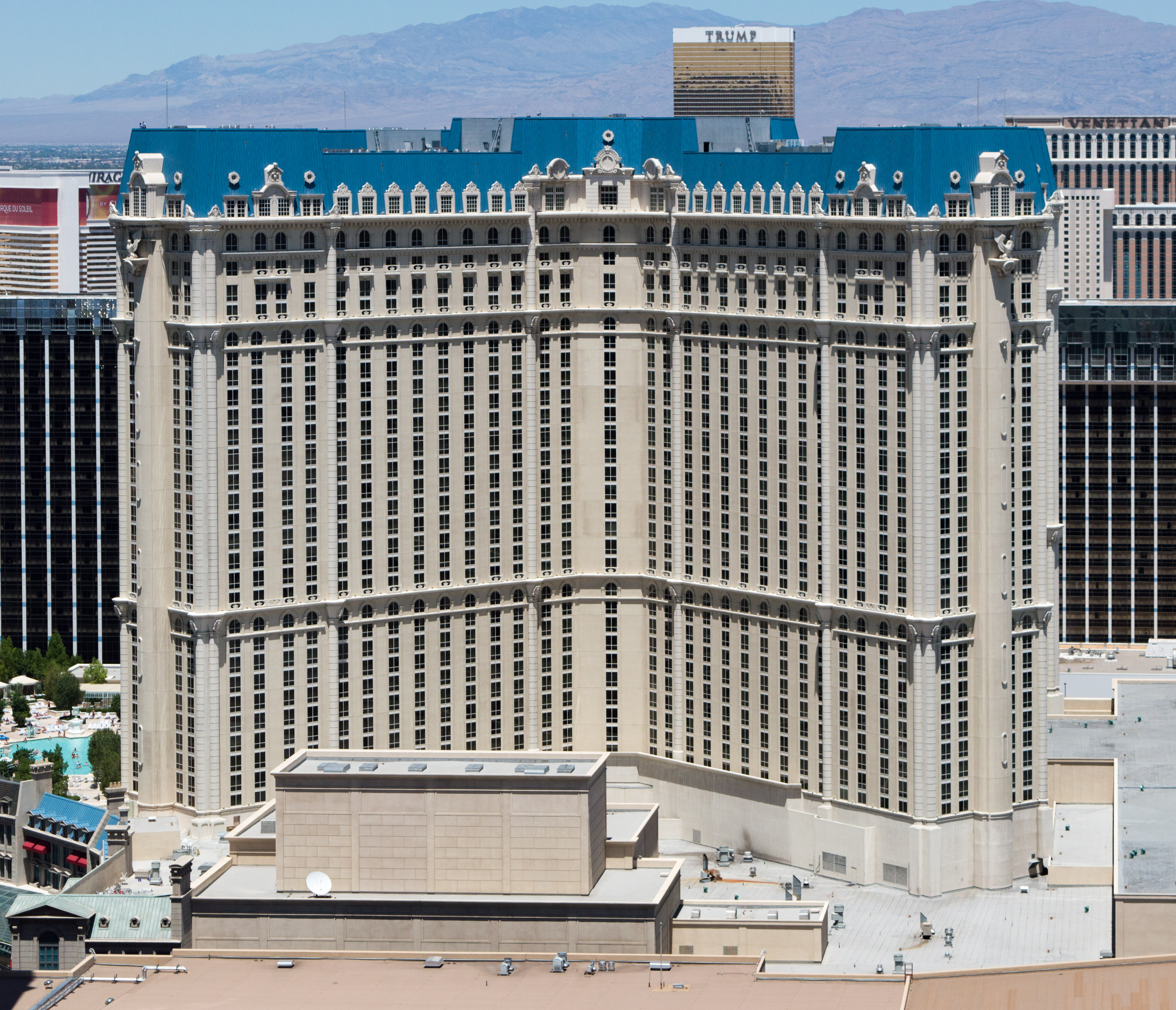
The original 34-story hotel tower

Paris Las Vegas includes a 95,263 sq ft (8,850.2 m^{2}) casino. To increase foot traffic, a new entrance along the Strip was added in 2003. The project included a new lounge and nightclub known as Risqué, which closed in 2010. Chateau Nightclub and Gardens opened the following year with 45,000 sq ft (4,200 m^{2}) of space, including outdoor areas overlooking the Strip.

The original hotel tower is 34 stories, and includes 2,916 rooms. An $87 million hotel renovation, covering 1,600 rooms, was underway in 2019. In 2023, it was announced that the 756-room Jubilee tower of the adjacent Horseshoe Las Vegas (formerly Bally's) would be incorporated into Paris Las Vegas as the Versailles tower.

The 26-story Jubilee tower was originally completed in 1981. A $100 million renovation project was launched to convert the building. Its height would be increased 17 feet (5.2 m) with a Parisian-style roof, and a skybridge would connect to the existing Paris tower. Balconies were also added to rooms on the older tower's west-facing side, overlooking the Fountains of Bellagio. The tower conversion was finished in 2024, bringing the total room count to 3,672.

=== Restaurants ===
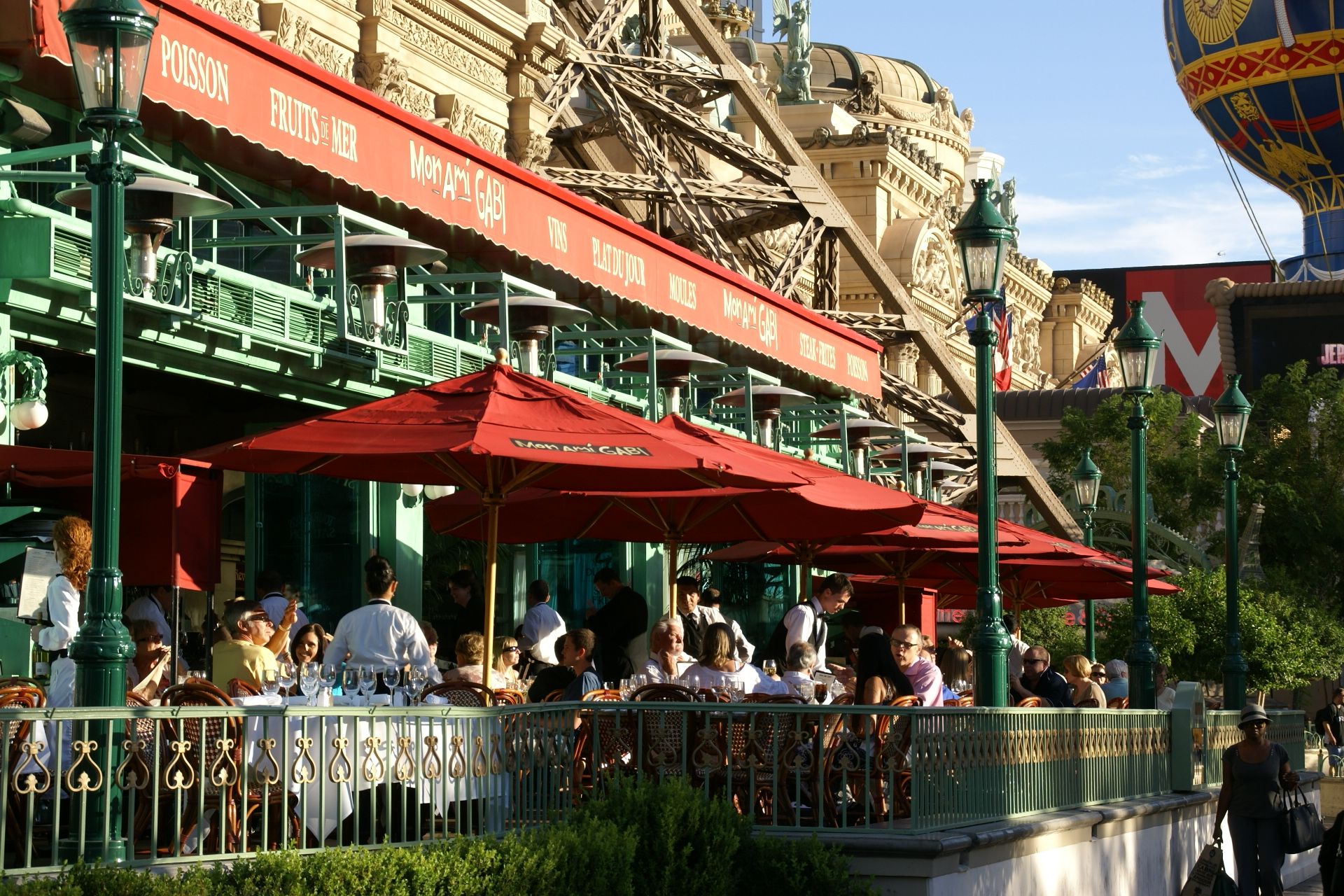
Patio dining along the Strip at Mon Ami Gabi

Paris Las Vegas opened with 10 restaurants, 7 of which served French food. Other choices included Chinese, Italian, and Mediterranean.

Among the original restaurants was Tres Jazz, by businessman Robert L. Johnson. It was the fourth in a chain of restaurants owned by his television channel BET. The restaurant included live jazz music and a television broadcasting the BET on Jazz network. With Tres Jazz, Johnson became the first black person to own a restaurant inside a Strip resort. BET was sold in 2001, and Johnson announced plans to purchase Tres Jazz from the network along with two partners. They opened a new restaurant later that year, replacing Tres Jazz.

Since the resort's opening, it has also featured Mon Ami Gabi, part of a chain of French bistros. The Eiffel Tower Restaurant seats 250 people and has long been overseen by French chef Jean Joho. Chef Gordon Ramsay opened his first Las Vegas restaurant, Gordon Ramsay Steak, at Paris in 2012. It was successful, leading to four other restaurants along the Strip.

Hexx Kitchen & Bar opened in 2015, and includes outdoor dining along the Strip. The adjacent Hexx Chocolate & Confexxions opened as the first "bean-to-bar" chocolate maker in Nevada. An addition to Hexx Kitchen, Alexxa's Bar, opened three years later. Beer Park also opened in 2016, featuring food and more than 70 varieties of beer.

A revamp of the restaurant offerings was underway in 2021. Vanderpump à Paris, by reality television star Lisa Vanderpump, opened in March 2022, marking her second Strip restaurant. Nobu also opened its second Strip location at Paris a month later. Other new restaurants included the 194-seat Bedford by Martha Stewart, marking her first restaurant venture. She was involved in the recipes and design, the latter inspired by her 1925 farmhouse in Bedford, New York.

== Shows and entertainers ==
Paris Las Vegas opened with a 1,400-seat performance theater. The venue has hosted numerous shows, though with minimal success. Notre-Dame de Paris, a popular musical in England and France, opened at the resort in January 2000. The Las Vegas run received mixed reviews, selling only 130,000 tickets before closing in July 2000.

We Will Rock You, a jukebox musical, opened in 2004. It closed the following year, as Harrah's sought to revamp the entertainment offerings at the newly purchased resort. The Producers, a Broadway musical comedy, ran from 2007 to 2008. To suit the Las Vegas demographic, the show was condensed to 90 minutes, down from the 150-minute Broadway version. During the show's first three months, the cast included actor David Hasselhoff as Roger De Bris, until he departed due to scheduling conflicts. The Producers would be the last resident show at Paris until March 2010, when Barry Manilow began a two-year residency.

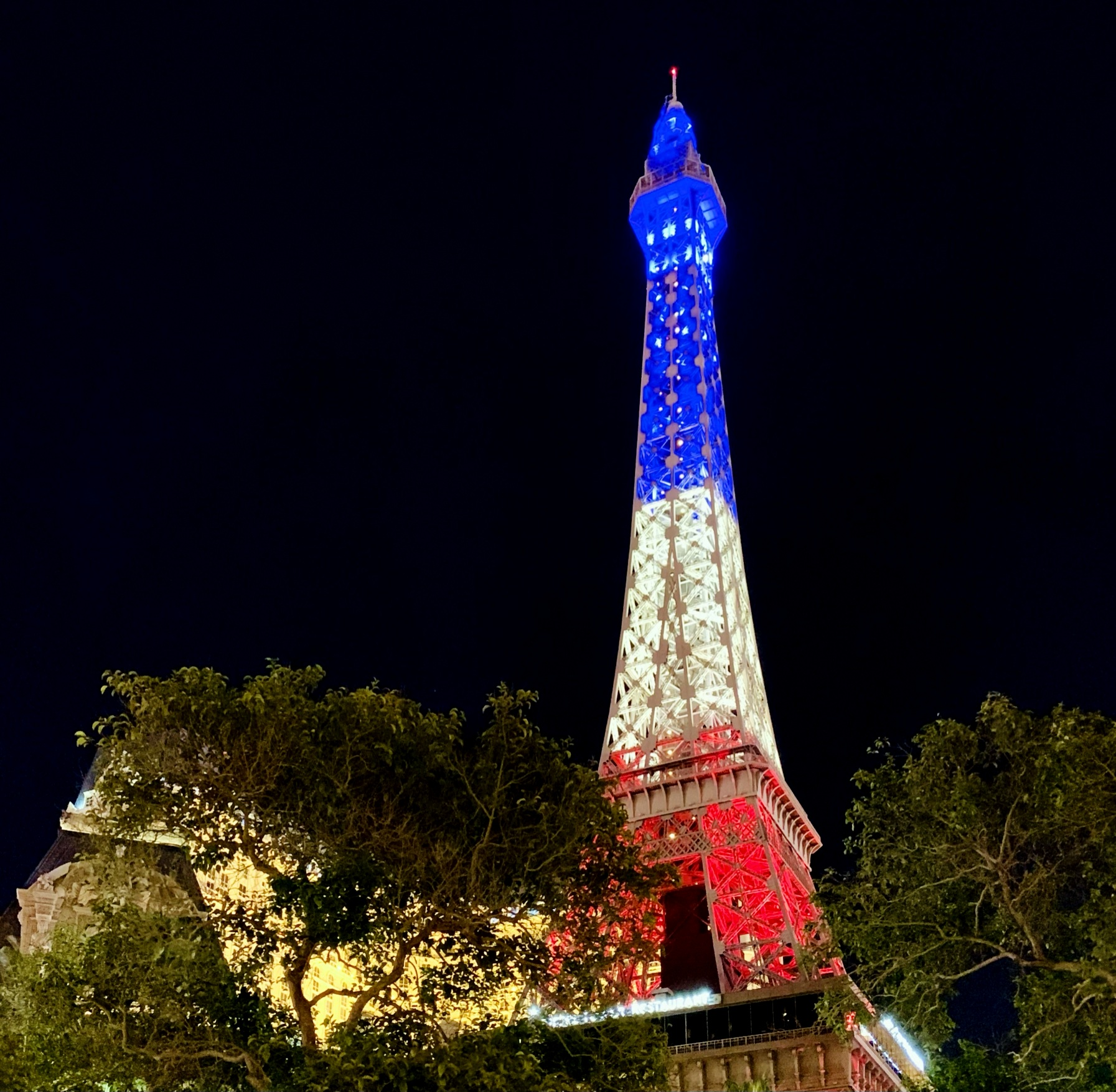
Eiffel Tower light show

The musical Jersey Boys opened in 2012, and lasted until 2016. It was replaced a year later by Circus 1903, replicating various circus acts from the early 20th century and incorporating life-sized elephant puppets. Although popular elsewhere, the Las Vegas version saw minimal success and concluded its run in January 2018, five months after opening. Circus 1903 was replaced shortly thereafter by Inferno, a pyrotechnic show starring Joe Labero and others as they performed fire-related stunts. Bat Out of Hell: The Musical opened at Paris in September 2022. Like previous shows at the resort, it closed due to low ticket sales in January 2023.

Aside from the theater, hypnotist Anthony Cools also performed in his own venue at the resort from 2005 to 2020, and had also opened a topless variety show there in 2007. Jeff Civillico performed a comedy show in the Anthony Cools Showroom from 2017 to 2019.

Until 2006, the resort interior offered free entertainment from various performers, including street musicians, mimes, and living statues.

A free five-minute light show debuted in 2019, illuminating the Eiffel Tower in red, white, and blue. The show, which cost $1.7 million to create, recurs throughout each night.

== In media ==
- Paris Las Vegas is featured in the 2001 Six Feet Under episode, The Trip.
- In the 2007 film Resident Evil: Extinction, the Eiffel Tower replica is seen buried in sand along with other Strip resorts, several years after a zombie apocalypse.
- The Eiffel Tower is destroyed by the female MUTO in the 2014 film Godzilla.
- The 2015 film We Are Your Friends includes scenes filmed in a hotel suite and on the casino floor.
- Pteranodons land on the Eiffel Tower in the post-credits scene of 2018's Jurassic World: Fallen Kingdom.

== Gallery ==
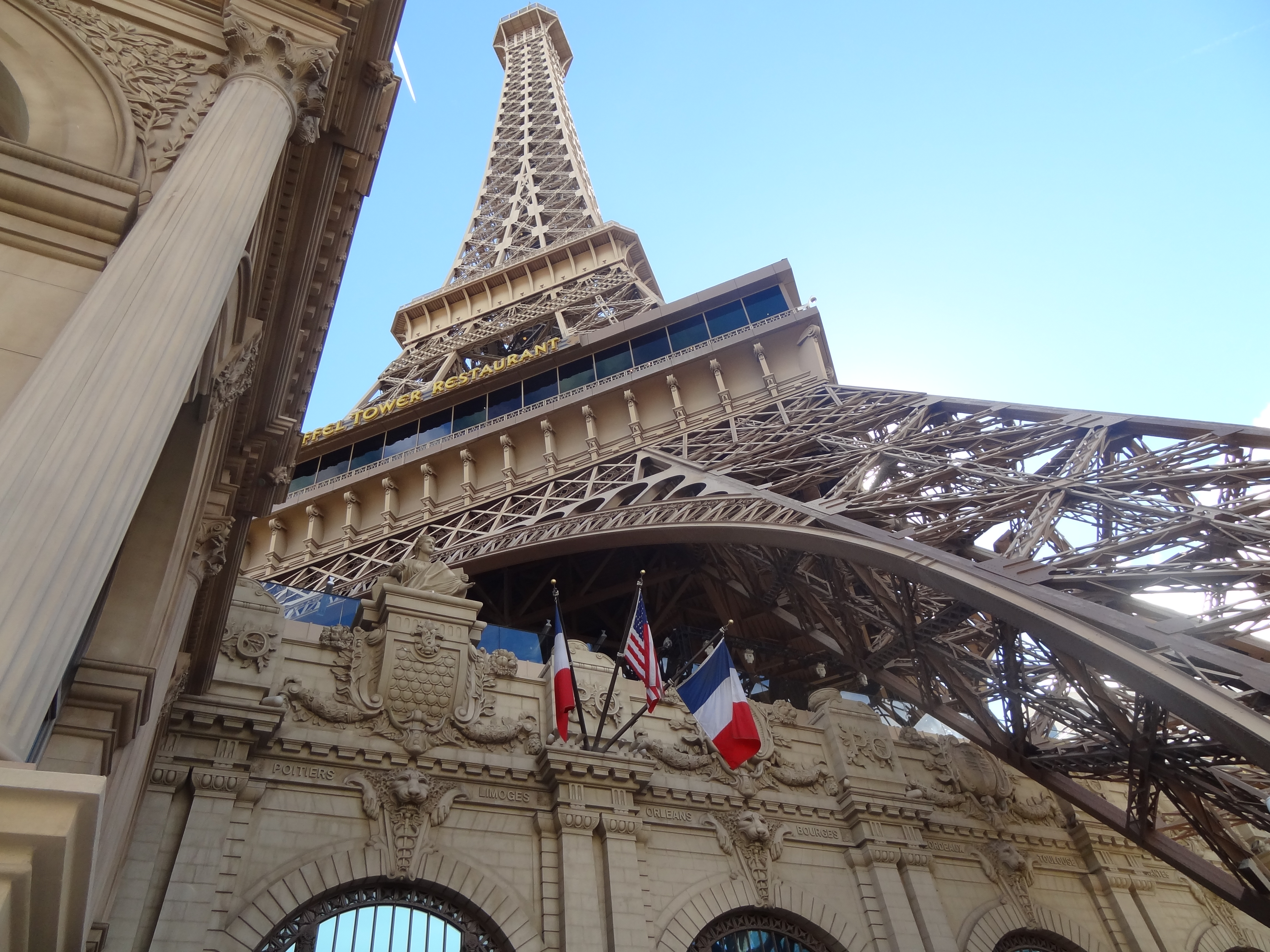
The Eiffel Tower replica, as seen from the Strip

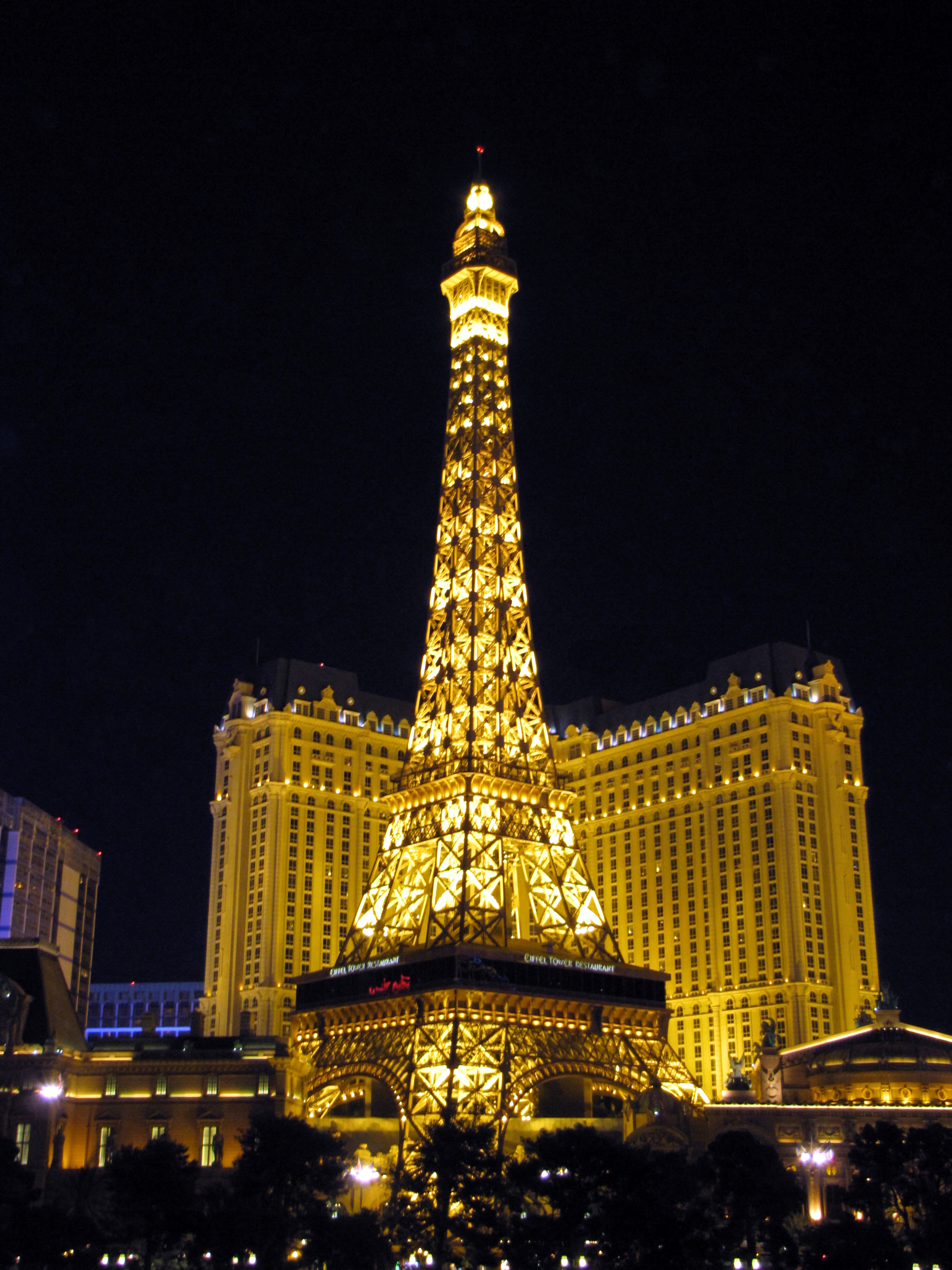
The Eiffel Tower and hotel at night

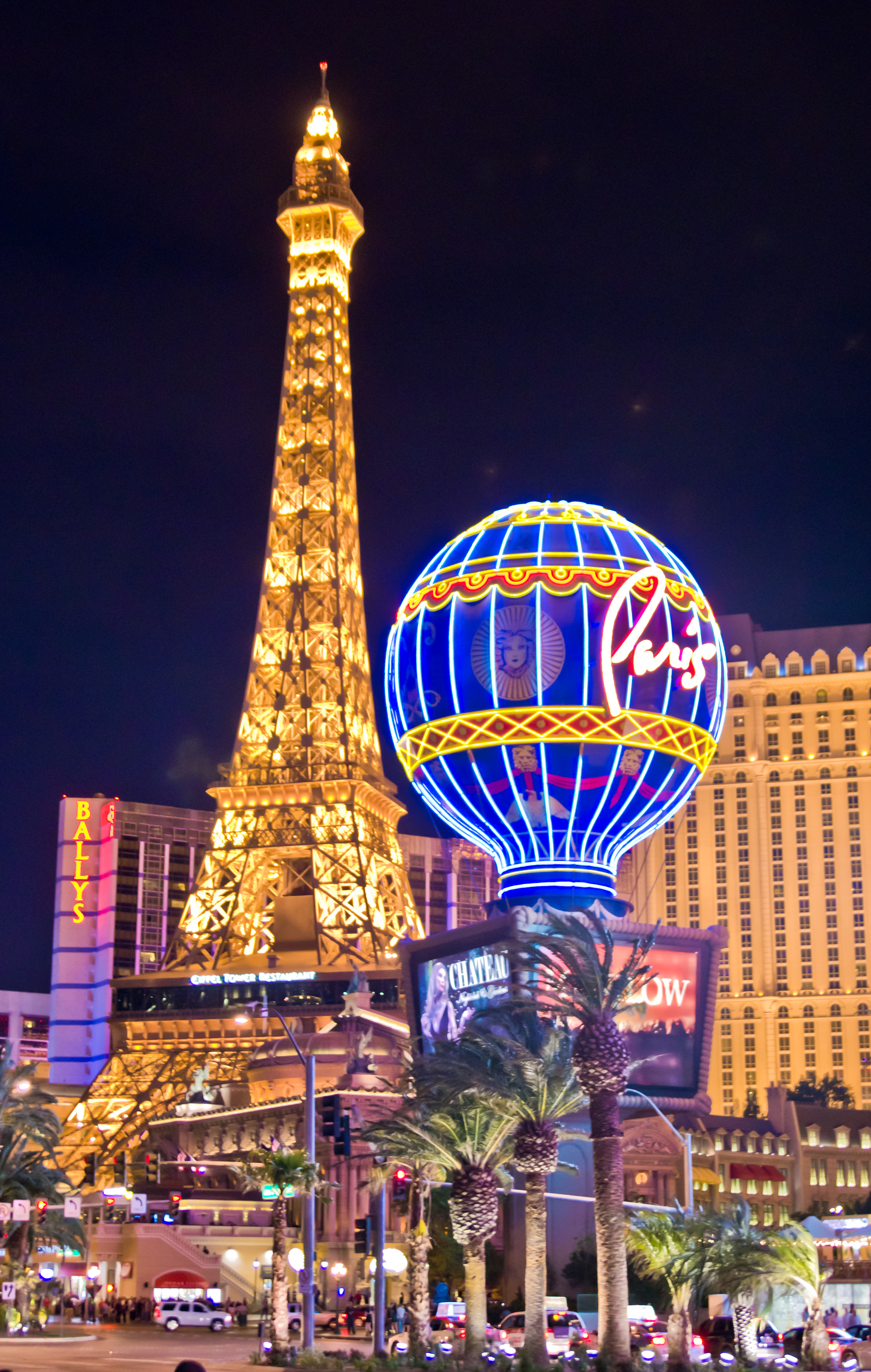
The Eiffel Tower and balloon sign at night

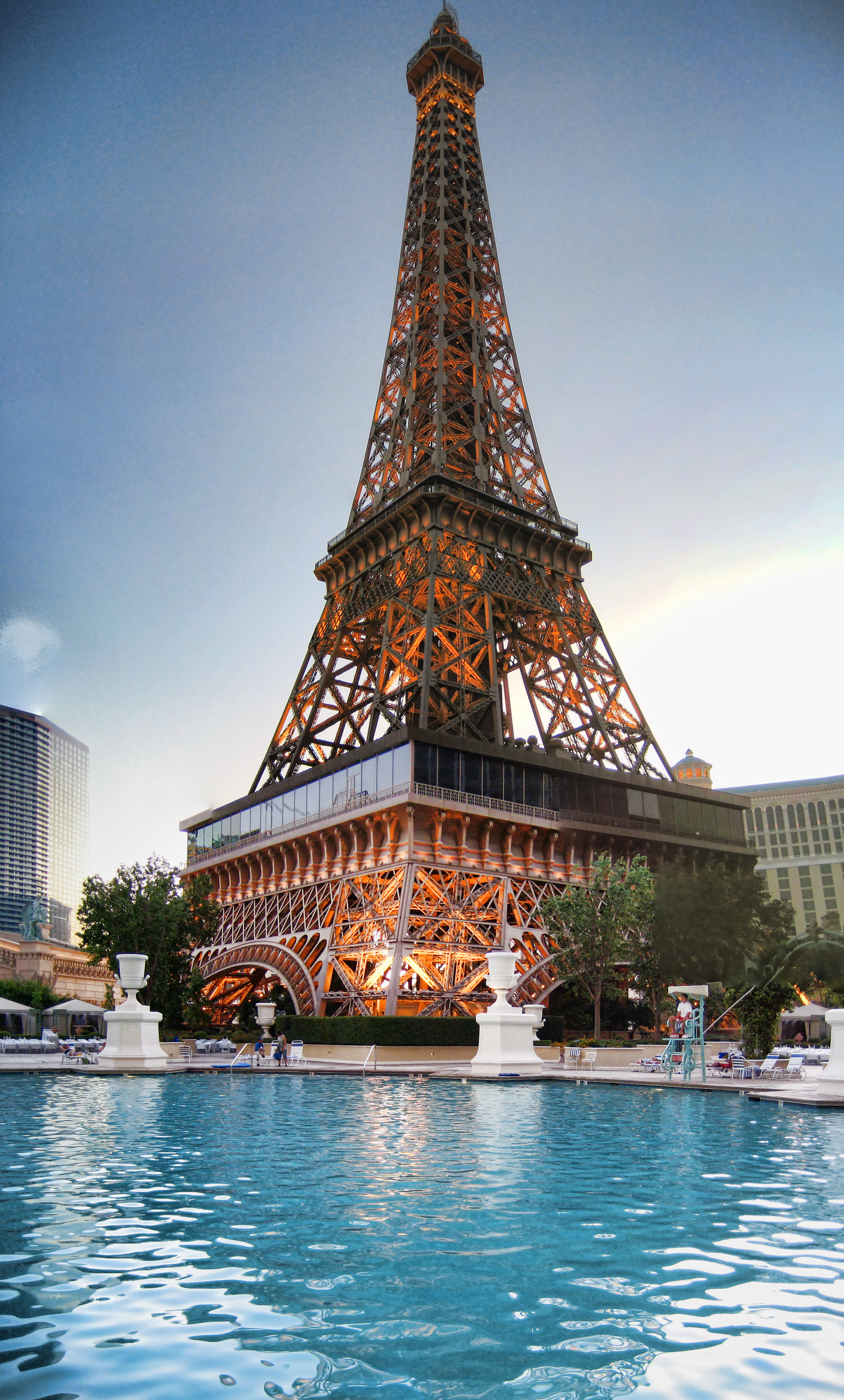
The Eiffel Tower, as seen from the pool area

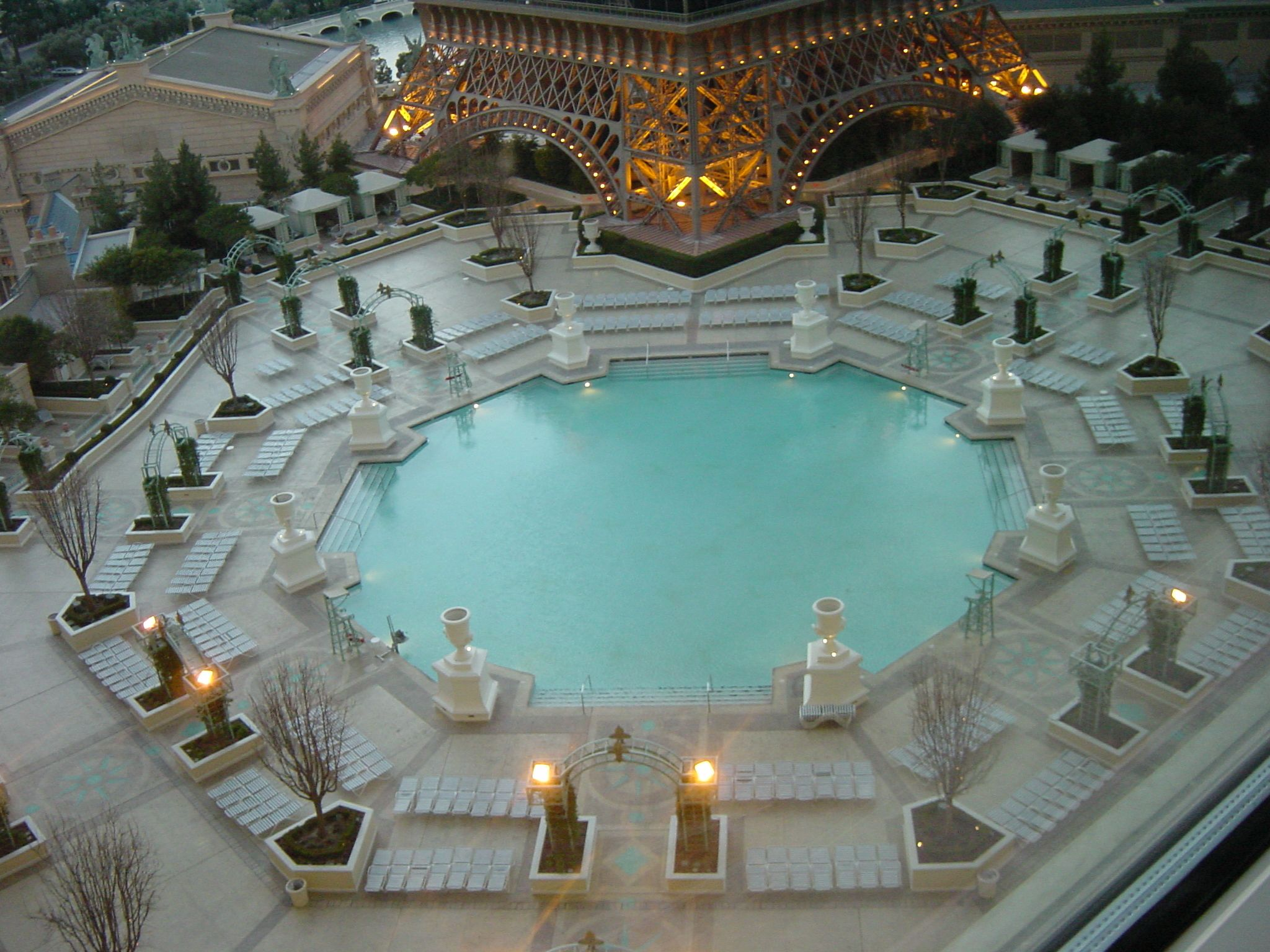
Overlooking the pool area

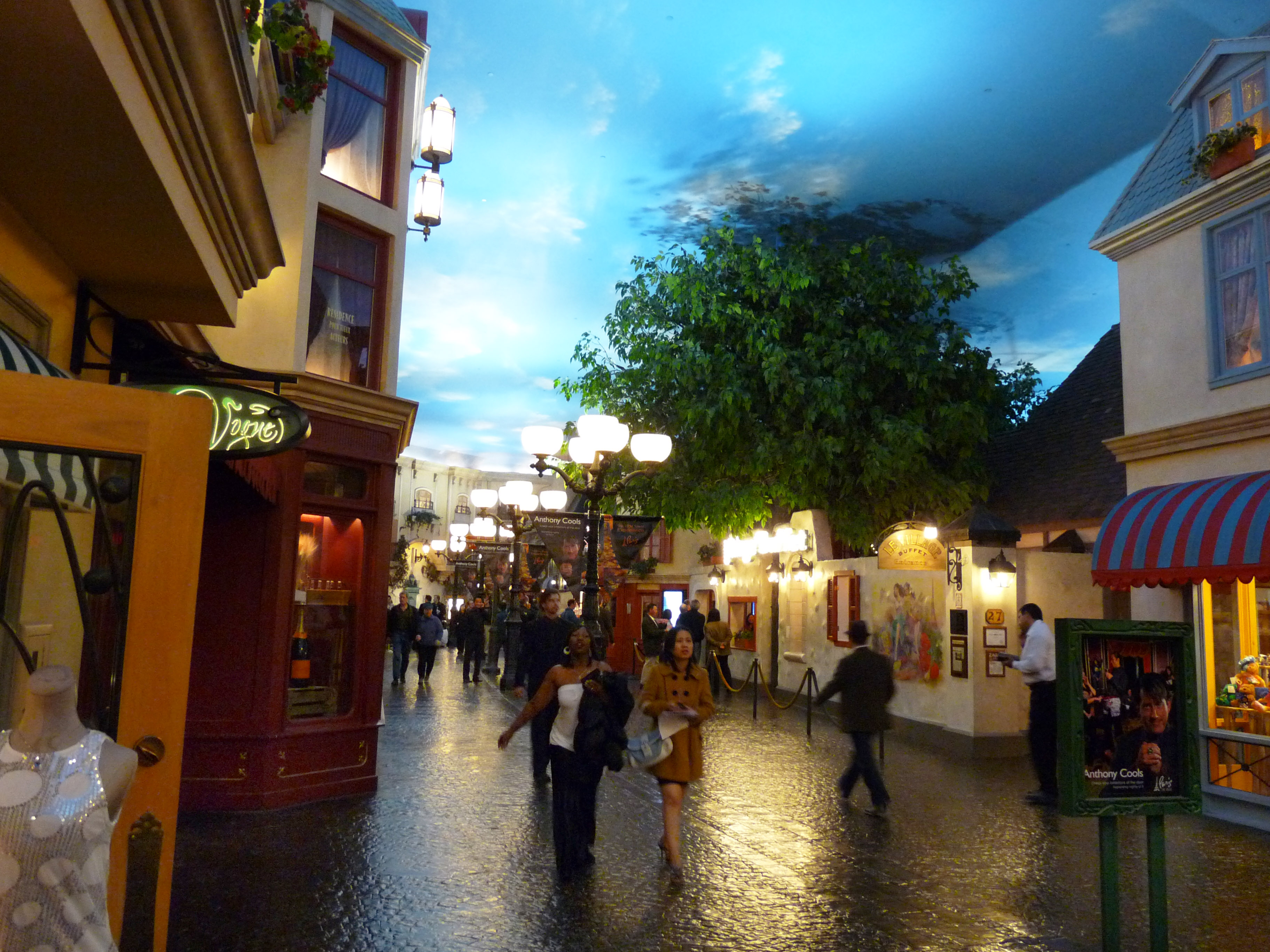
Parisian street recreation inside the resort

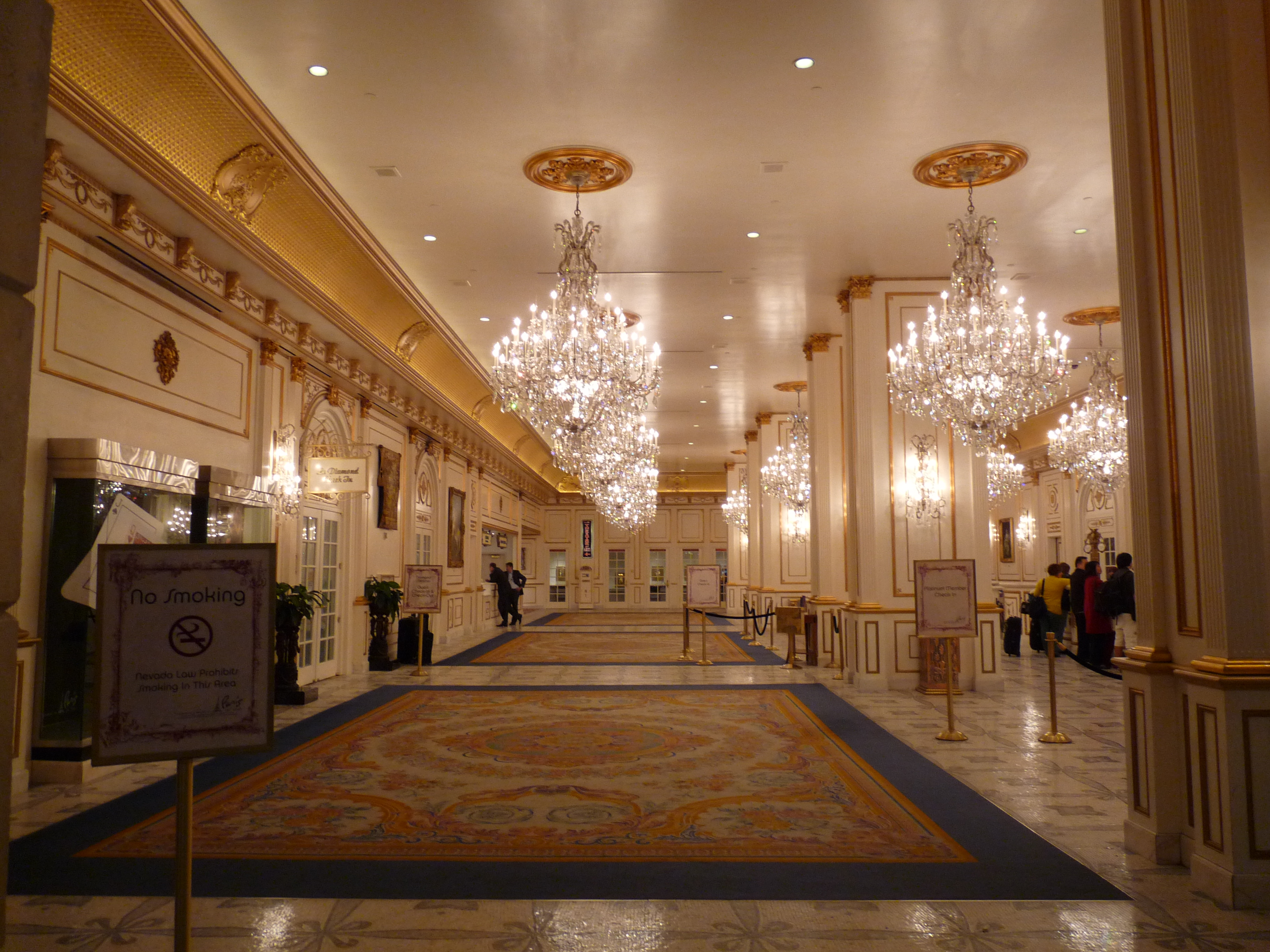
Hotel lobby

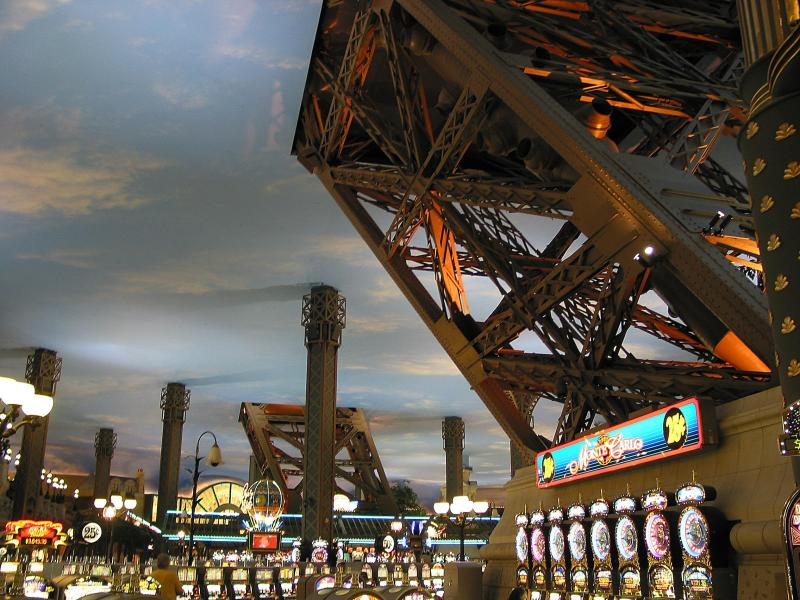
Legs of the Eiffel Tower on the casino floor

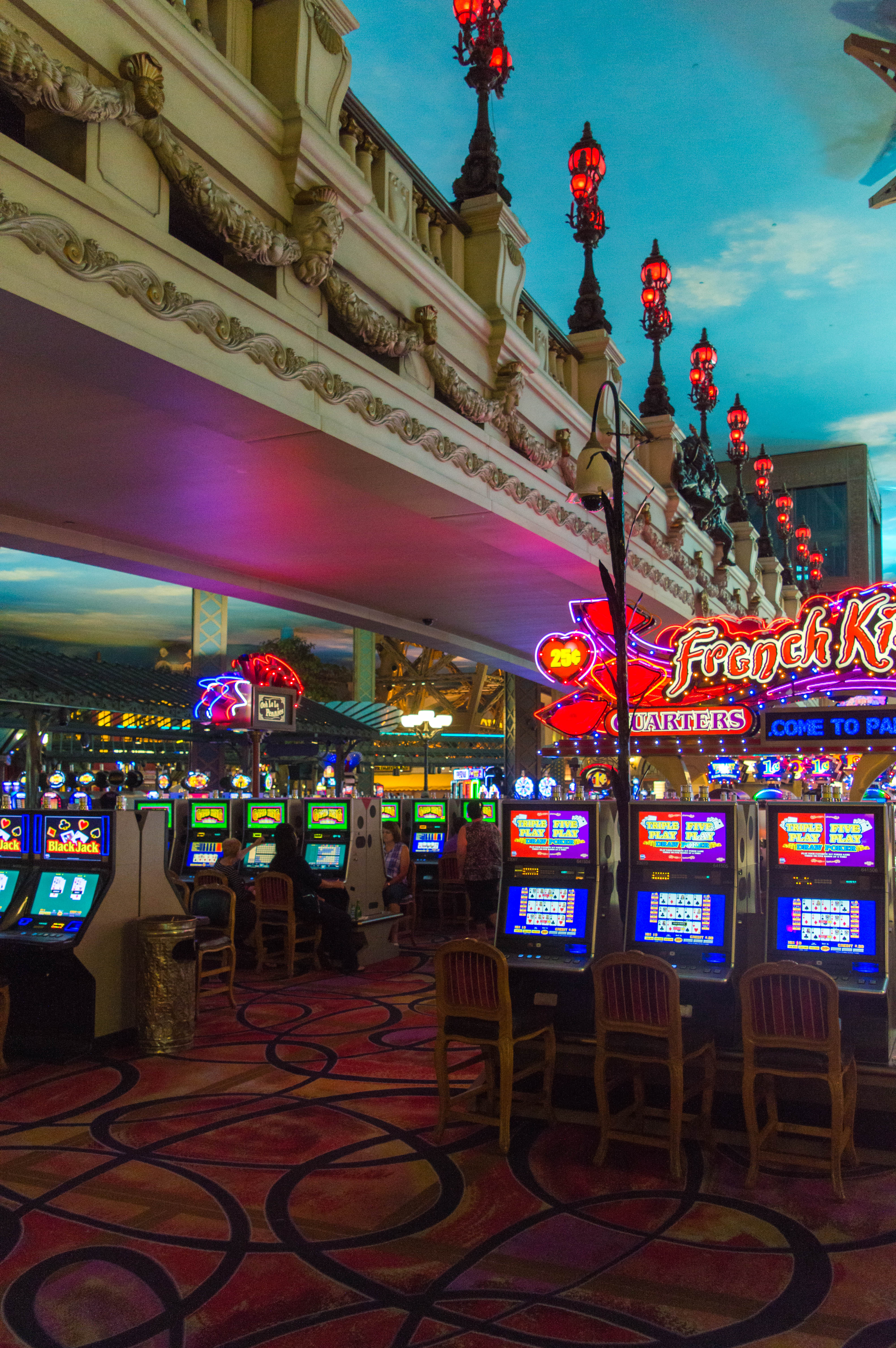
Replica of the Pont Alexandre III bridge above the casino floor

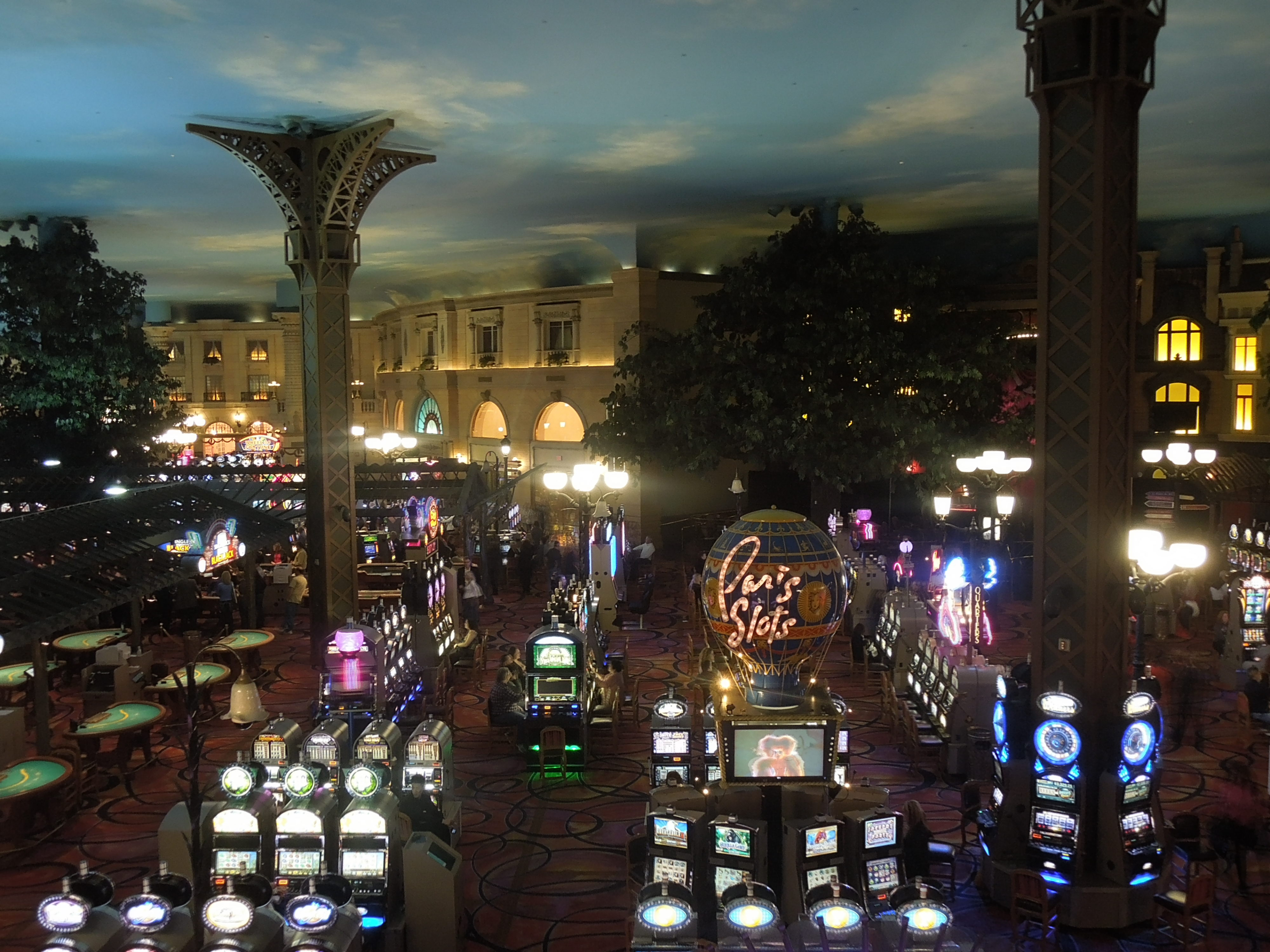
Overlooking the casino floor in 2012

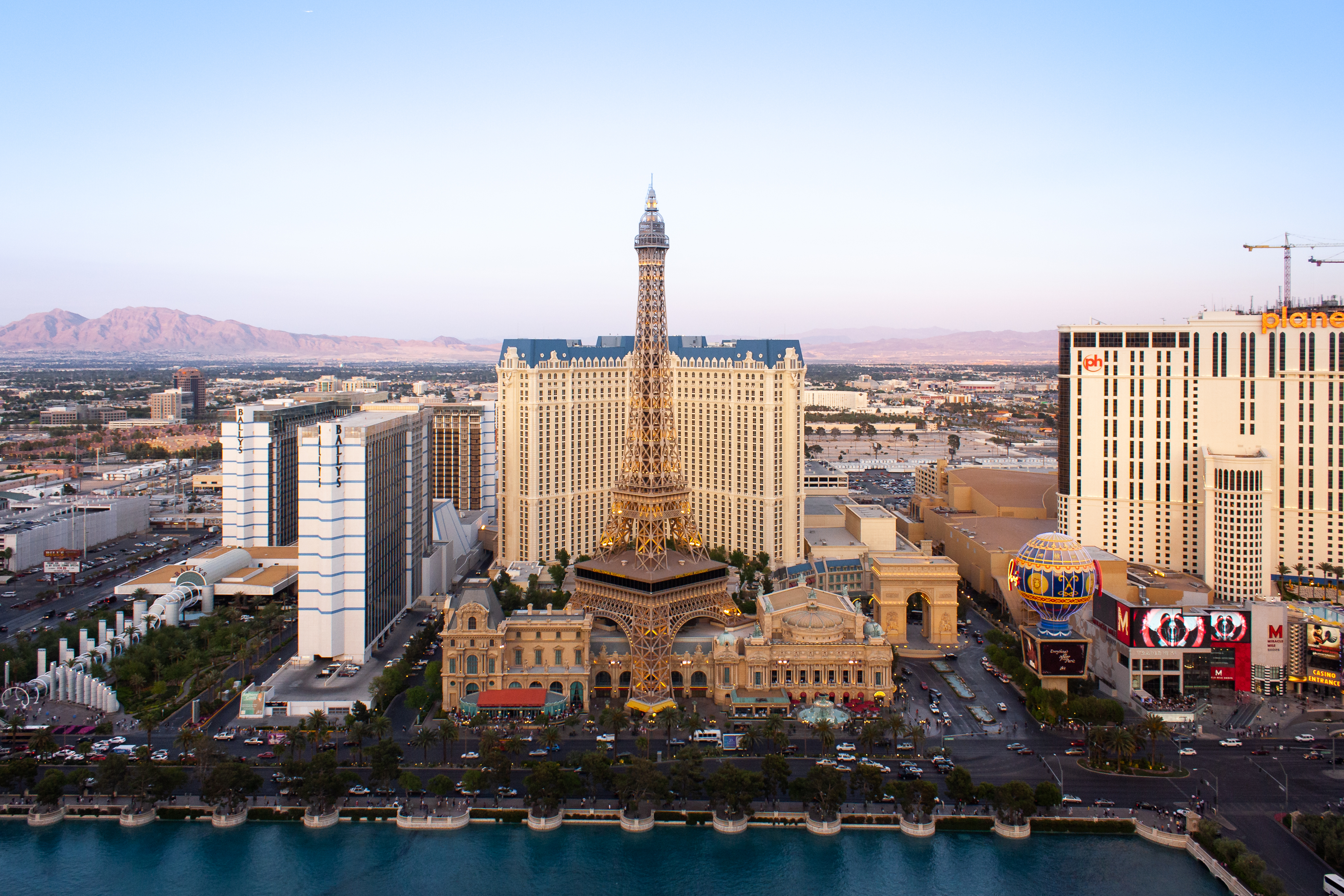
Paris, in between Bally's and Planet Hollywood

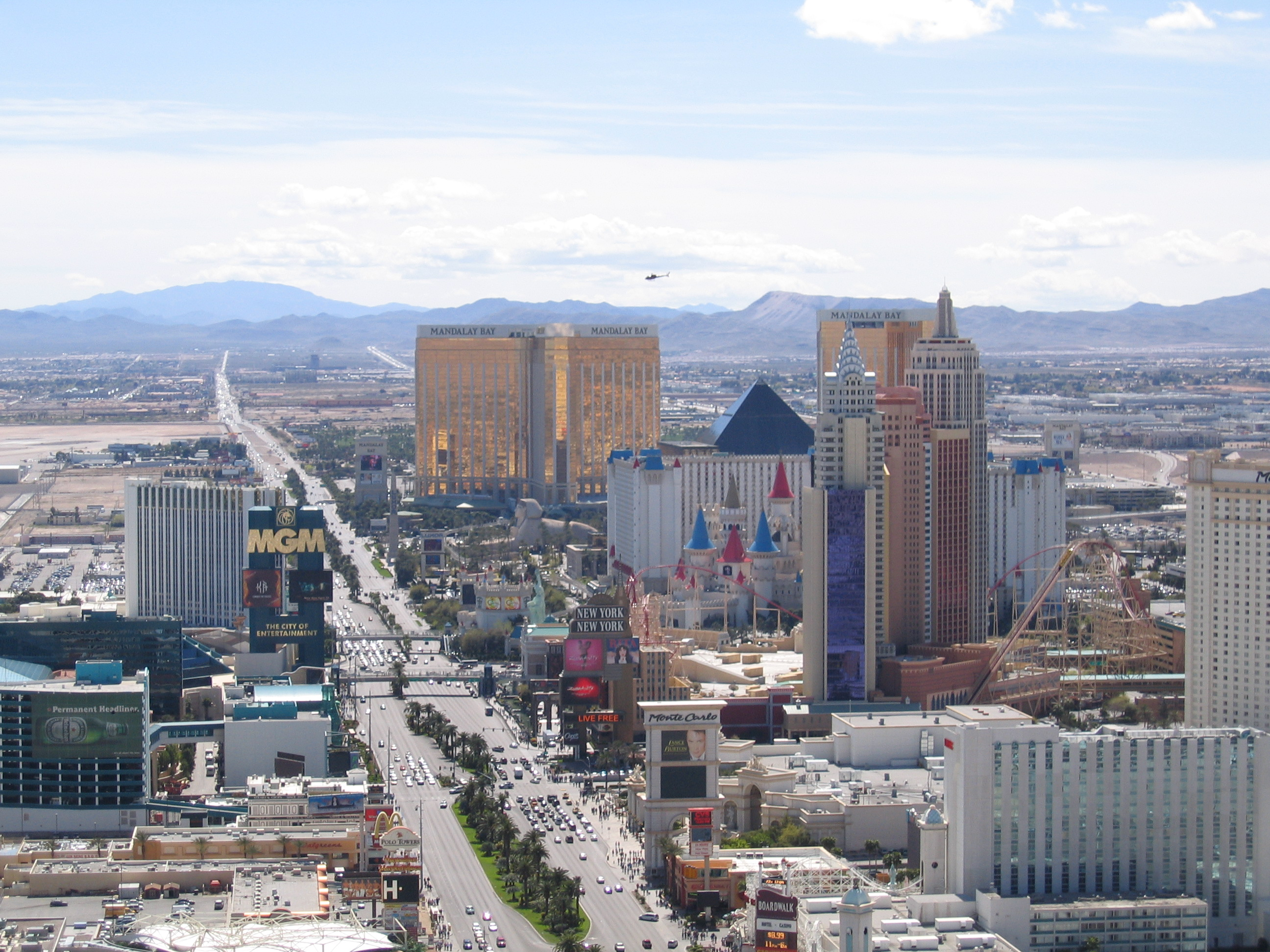
South-facing view from the Eiffel Tower in 2005

== See also ==
- List of casinos in Nevada
- List of integrated resorts
- List of largest hotels
- The Parisian Macao – similarly themed resort in Macau, owned by Las Vegas Sands
