= Rick Tramonto =

American chef

- Born: Richard Michael Tramonto; May 30, 1963 (age 63); Rochester, New York
- Education: John Marshall High School, Rochester NY
- Culinary career
- Cooking style: Contemporary American cuisine
- Current restaurant(s): Restaurant R'evolution New Orleans, Seafood R'evolution Jackson MS
- Award(s) won: Food & Wine Magazine 's Top Ten Best New Chefs, 1994; "Best Chef: Midwest Region" by The James Beard Foundation, 2002
- Website: www.tramontocuisine.com

Richard Michael Tramonto (born May 30, 1963) is a Chicago chef and cookbook author. He was executive chef and partner in Tru, a contemporary fine-dining restaurant from Lettuce Entertain You Enterprises.

== Biography ==
A native of Rochester, New York, Tramonto began his culinary career working in a Wendy's Old Fashioned Hamburgers. He later worked in New York City and London, England. In 1994, while at Trio in Evanston, Illinois, Tramonto was named among Food & Wine Magazine's Top Ten Best New Chefs.

In 1999, he opened Tru with culinary partner Gale Gand and Rich Melman of Lettuce Entertain You Enterprises. Tramonto and his partners at Tru won the 2007 James Beard Foundation Award for Service. Tramonto was named the "Best Chef: Midwest Region" by The James Beard Foundation in 2002. At this time, Rick was also a featured chef on Great Chef television, appearing in episodes of Great Chefs of America, Great Chefs - Great Cities, Top Chef, Top Chef Masters, and Iron Chef America.

Tramonto founded Cenitare Restaurants in 2006, opening several restaurants in a Wheeling, Illinois hotel, including Tramonto's Steak & Seafood (now closed), Osteria di Tramonto (now closed) and RT Lounge (now closed). He left the company in 2009.

Tramonto left Tru in 2010.

== Works ==
- Butter, Sugar, Flour, Eggs ISBN 0-609-60420-1
- American Brasserie ISBN 0-02-861630-8
- Amuse-Bouche ISBN 0-375-50760-4
- Tru ISBN 1-4000-6061-3
- Fantastico! ISBN 978-0-7679-2381-1
- Steak with Friends ISBN 978-0-7407-9257-1
- Scars of a Chef ISBN 9781414331621

On July 30, 2006, he and Gale Gand appeared on Iron Chef: America, losing to Mario Batali (53 - 46) In 2010, appeared on Bravo's Top Chef Masters Season 2. He was eliminated in the fourth episode of the season.
