= L2O =

- Interactive map of L2O

Restaurant information
- Established: 2008; 18 years ago
- Closed: 2014; 12 years ago
- Head chef: Laurent Gras
- Rating: Michelin Guide
- Location: 2300 N. Lincoln Park West, Chicago, Illinois, 60614, United States
- Coordinates: 41°55′26.8″N 87°38′11.9″W

L_{2}O was a Chicago seafood restaurant opened in 2008 by chef Laurent Gras and owned and operated by Lettuce Entertain You Enterprises. The name of the restaurant stands for Lake to Ocean. The restaurant was located at 2300 N. Lincoln Park West, Chicago, Illinois 60614.

L_{2}O and Alinea were the only restaurants in Chicago to receive three stars from the 2010 Michelin Guide. L_{2}O earned 1 Michelin star in the 2011 guide and two stars in the 2012 guide. Matthew Kirkley became L_{2}O's chef in November 2011. In 2012, the restaurant installed twin saltwater tanks that house live shellfish. The restaurant closed in December 2014.

== See also ==
- List of seafood restaurants
- List of Michelin-starred restaurants in Chicago
