= Mon Ami Gabi =

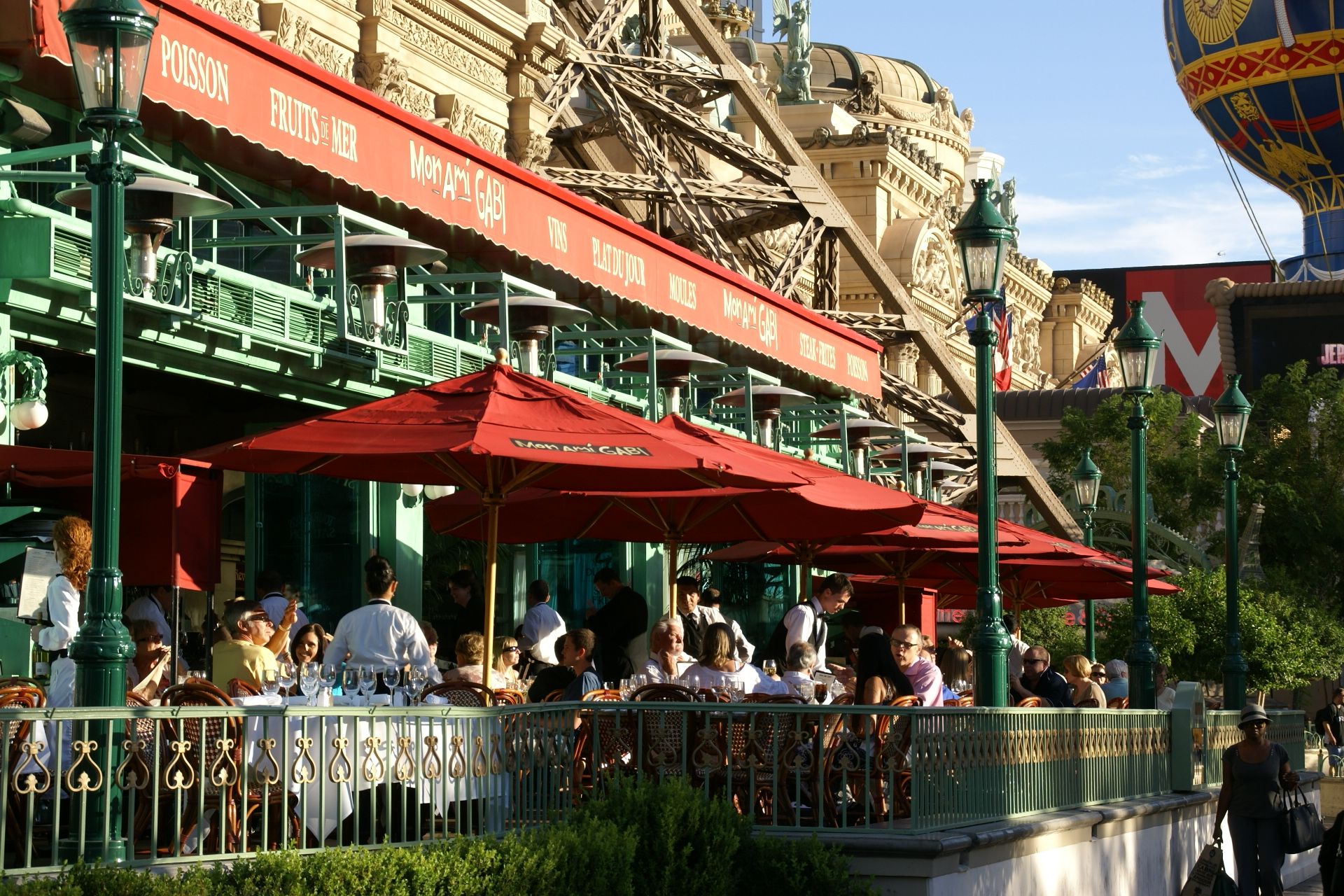
- Mon Ami Gabi in Las Vegas

Restaurant information
- Established: 1998
- Owner: Lettuce Entertain You Enterprises
- Head chef: Gabino Sotelino
- Chef: Susan Weaver Nelli Maltezos
- Pastry chef: Erin Mooney
- Food type: French bistro
- Dress code: Casual
- Rating: Zagat - 4.5
- Location: 2300 N. Lincoln Park West, Chicago, Illinois, 60614, United States
- Reservations: Yes
- Other locations: Oak Brook, Illinois (closed); Reston, Virginia (closed); Bethesda, Maryland; Las Vegas, Nevada
- Website: monamigabi.com

Mon Ami Gabi is a chain of French bistros in the United States operated by Lettuce Entertain You Enterprises. Mon Ami Gabi has five locations, with the original located in Lincoln Park, Chicago.

== History ==
The concept for Mon Ami Gabi was created after a family dinner that Lettuce Entertain You Enterprises (LEYE) founder Rich Melman had at Ambria, a fine dining French restaurant owned by LEYE. Melman enjoyed the more casual French bistro dishes prepared by the French cooks and in 1998, LEYE opened the first Mon Ami Gabi in the Lincoln Park neighborhood of Chicago, Illinois.

The restaurant name, Mon Ami Gabi, translates into "My Friend Gabi". The restaurant is named after LEYE chef-partner Gabino Sotelino after chef Jean Banchet greeted Sotelino with “Hey mon ami Gabi, how are you?”. The original Chicago location is in the Belden Stratford, a former hotel which is listed on the National Register of Historic Places.

In 2017, Mon Ami Gabi at Paris Las Vegas was named one of the top 100 restaurants in the country for gross food and beverage sales by Restaurant Business. The restaurant grossed $17.2 million in sales and served an estimated 300,000 meals.

Sotelino serves as head chef of the restaurant group and his son, Mark Sotelino, is a supervising partner. Nelli Maltezos is the executive chef for the Lincoln Park location. Vincent Pouessel became executive chef at the Las Vegas location in 2016. currently Jody Richardson is the General Manager of the Chicago location.

On November 24, 2021, the Oak Brook, IL location closed. On December 31, 2023, the Reston, VA location closed.

== Design and ambiance ==
Mon Ami Gabi restaurants are styled after French bistros. Restaurants have dark wood, No. 14 chairs, tile flooring and tulip lamps. Most locations have patios. The Las Vegas location has a large patio which overlooks the Las Vegas Strip, including views of the Fountains of Bellagio.

== Cuisine and beverages ==
=== Food ===
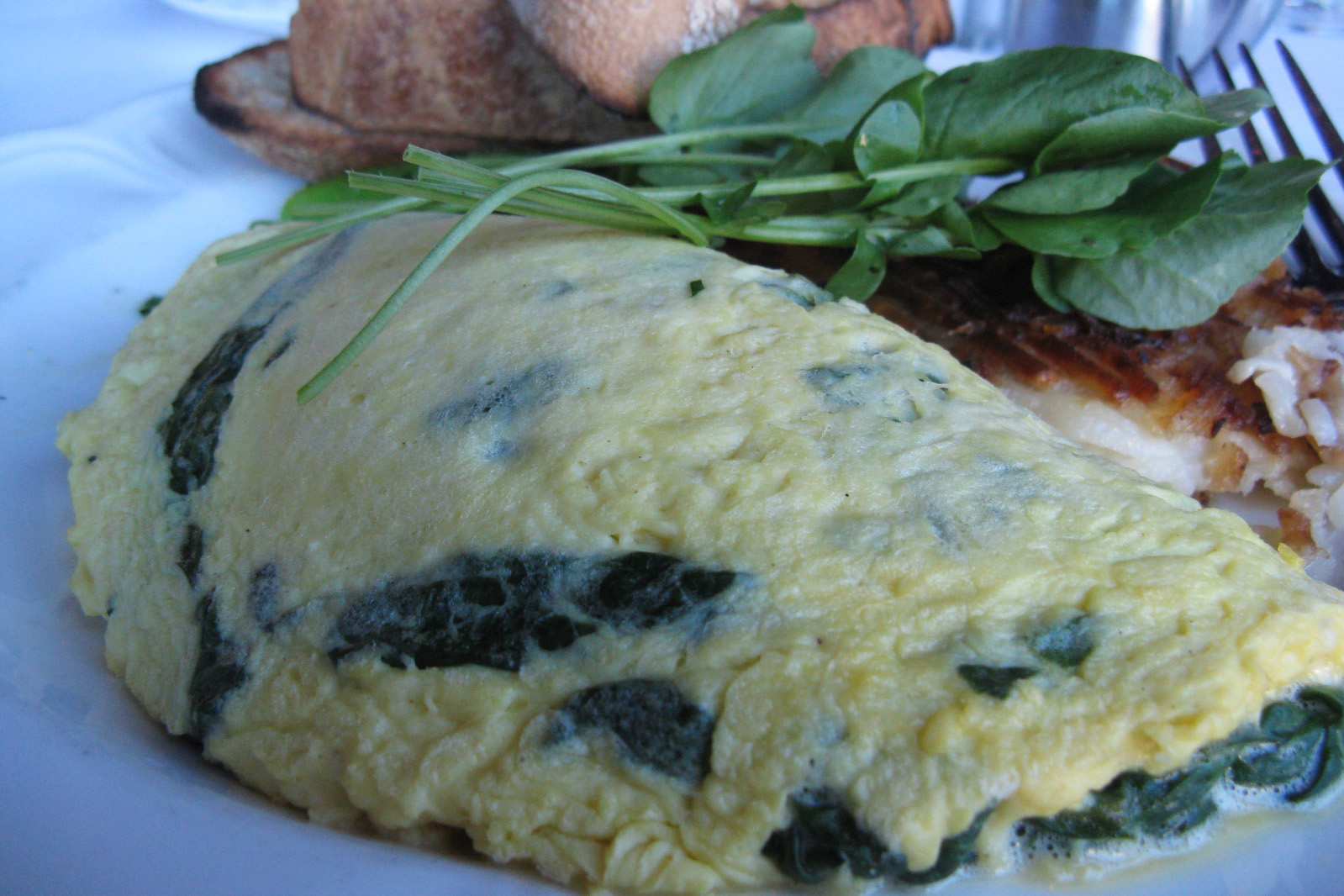
A spinach omelette at Mon Ami Gabi in Las Vegas

Mon Ami Gabi serves traditional French bistro food. Meals are served with a French baguette. Appetizers include chicken liver pâté with violet mustard, onion soup topped with gruyere, endive salad with blue cheese, and escargot with pureed parsley.

Main entrees include half-chicken with potato puree, pearl onions and bacon, steak frites, mussels, crepes and quiches.

Mon Ami Gabi's brunch includes the French Kiss, a breakfast sandwich with beef, mustard, a fried egg, and a spread of chicken liver pate. Crepes include a chicken, kale and mushroom crepe with Mornay sauce.

Desserts include apple tart tatin and a Bananas Foster crepe.

=== Drinks ===
The wine list includes at least 80 small production French wines. Sotelino serves as wine director. In 2017, the Lincoln Park location opened a rosé bar, a six-seat bar that serves only rosé wine and related cocktails and a special bar menu.

The cocktail menu includes a Bloody Mary garnished with pate, bacon, cheese, an olive and celery. The restaurants offer seven sparkling wine cocktails made with fresh juice.

== Reception ==
The Lincoln Park location has a 4.5 out of 5 rating for the food and service by Zagat. The same location also received an 8 out of 10 rating for brunch by Chicago critic Carrie Schedler. Washington Post dining critic Tom Sietsema rated the Bethesda location one out of four stars in 2016. The Las Vegas location has been named one of the top 10 restaurants for French food by 10Best.
