= Belinda Chang (author) =

Chinese-language author from Taiwan

- Born: Zhang Huiyuan (張惠媛); 1963 (age 62–63)
- Education: National Taiwan University; New York University
- Occupation: Writer
- Writing career
- Language: Chinese

Chinese name
- Traditional Chinese: 章緣
- Simplified Chinese: 章缘
Transcriptions
Standard Mandarin
- Hanyu Pinyin: Zhāng Yuán
- Wade–Giles: Chang^{1} Yuan^{2}

Real name
- Traditional Chinese: 張惠媛
- Simplified Chinese: 张惠媛
Transcriptions
Standard Mandarin
- Hanyu Pinyin: Zhāng Huìyuán
- Wade–Giles: Chang^{1} Huei^{4}-yuan^{2}

Belinda Chang (born 1963) is a Chinese-language author from Taiwan. She graduated from National Taiwan University's Chinese department, and went on to earn a master's degree in performance culture from New York University. After living in the United States for thirteen years, she later relocated to Beijing and then Shanghai.

== Career ==
Chang launched her writing career while living in the United States and working as a reporter for the World Journal. Her son was born around the time of her first collection of short stories. That collection, entitled Women in the Locker Room, featured sixteen stories; her next collection, The Night of the Flood, contained fourteen. Most of her protagonists were women from Taiwan who had come to the United States for their studies. Her third work and first full-length novel, The City of Plague, described the mid-life crises of the Chinese residents of Queens, New York City's Flushing district; she wrote it as a form of farewell to her own youth. Many readers in Taiwan mistook the title as a reference to SARS, but in fact it came from a 1999 outbreak of West Nile virus infections in New York, which had provided Chang's original impetus for writing the novel.

In June 2004, Chang announced that she would follow her husband to Beijing, China, where he was being sent by his employer, a mobile phone technology company. The North America Chinese Writers' Association held a farewell banquet in her honor. After arriving in China, she finished her third collection of short stories, Two Ships in the Night, which touched on the themes of middle age, having children, and living in China; in total, they had taken her seven years to write. She and her family would live in Beijing for barely more than a year before relocating to Shanghai in August 2005. After the move, Chang flew to San Jose with her son to visit relatives and took a cruise to Alaska before returning to her new home in Shanghai. A collection of essays featuring her lives in Beijing and Shanghai was published in 2008, titled Being the Neighbor of Eileen Chang.

== Critical response ==
Chang's short stories have received a positive critical response from literary critics C. T. Hsia and David Der-wei Wang. Her works won her the "Best short story from a new author" prize from her publisher, as well as a later literary prize from the Central Daily News.

== Works ==
- Chang, Belinda (July 1997), 《更衣室的女人》 [The Changing-Room Women] (in Chinese), Taipei: Unitas, ISBN 957-522-174-5
- Chang, Belinda (February 2000), 《大水之夜》 [The Night of the Flood] (in Chinese), Taipei: Unitas, ISBN 957-522-270-9
- Chang, Belinda (January 2003), 《疫》 [The City of Plague] (in Chinese), Taipei: Unitas, ISBN 9575224132
- Chang, Belinda (August 2005), 《擦肩而過》 [Two Ships in the Night] (in Chinese), Taipei: Unitas, ISBN 957-522-548-1
- Chang, Belinda (January 2008), 《當張愛玲的鄰居》 [Being Eileen Chang's Neighbour] (in Chinese), Taipei: Chien Hsing Publishing, ISBN 957-522-270-9
- Chang, Belinda (September 2009), 《越界》 [Crossing the Boundary] (in Chinese), Taipei: Unitas, ISBN 957-522-846-4
