= Lettuce Entertain You Enterprises =

Hospitality group based in Chicago

Lettuce Entertain You Enterprises, Inc.
- Type: Private
- Industry: Restaurants
- Founded: 1971; 55 years ago, in Chicago, Illinois
- Founder: Rich Melman & Jerry A. Orzoff
- Headquarters: Chicago, Illinois, U.S.
- Revenue: ▲$500 million (2005)
- Net income: ▲$80 million (2005)
- Number of employees: 8,000 (2018)
- Website: www.leye.com

Lettuce Entertain You Enterprises, Inc. (LEYE) is a restaurant group currently comprising 120 or more restaurants mainly located in the Chicago metropolitan area. It was founded by Rich Melman and Jerry A. Orzoff in 1971.

== History ==
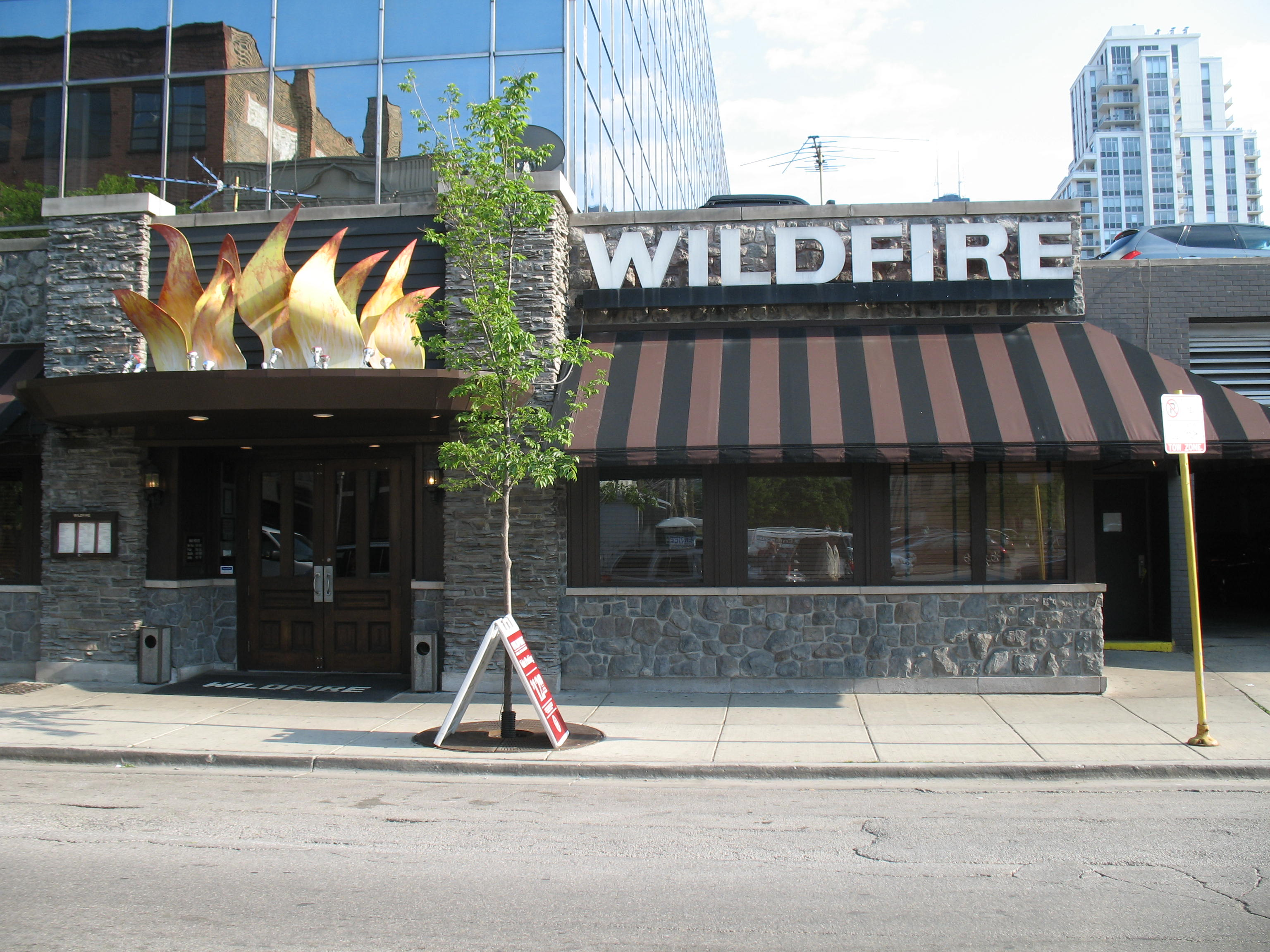
The original Wildfire location on Erie Street in Chicago.

The first restaurant, R.J. Grunts in Lincoln Park, opened on June 10, 1971. It is still in operation, as of 2026.

The company lists nine original partners: Bill Higgins, Melman, Bill Frost, Bob Wattel, Charles Haskell, Orzoff, Marvin Magid, Danny Koval and Fred Joast. By 1976 the company had 5 restaurants and a band called Fresh Lettuce. The partners continued expanding the company's network of restaurants. By the mid-1980s, the company employed over 2,000 people and had annual revenues of $40 million. Since its founding the company has opened 130 restaurants, with 70 concepts.

The restaurants vary in price, theme, and cuisine. LEYE currently owns, licenses or manages more than 100 establishments in Illinois, California, Arizona, Maryland, Virginia, Minnesota and Nevada, including Wildfire, Petterino's, RPM Italian, RPM Steak, Beatrix, Oyster Bah, Shaw's Crab House, and Everest. Also among its creations are two restaurants in the Paris Casino on the Las Vegas Strip, the Eiffel Tower and Mon Ami Gabi (an expansion of the flagship location in Chicago), Big Bowl, and L2O.

IN 2000, LEYE had 38 partners, 45 concepts, and 4,000 employees. It owns, operates and licenses 90 restaurant venues in the United States. It has separate restaurant consulting and restaurant development companies. The food court at Water Tower Place is among its operations. 1999 annual revenue estimates ranged from $145 to over $200 million. 2005 revenue estimates were $300 million, with 5000 employees and approximately $50 million in net earnings. The Lettuce Entertain You Restaurants annual revenue was $541.2 million in 2025.

== Restaurants ==
Lettuce Entertain You restaurants include:

- Aba
- Antico Posto
- Beatrix
- Beatrix Market
- Big Bowl
- Big Bowl Chinese Express
- Bub City
- Cafe Ba-Ba-Reeba!
- Di Pescara
- Eiffel Tower
- El Segundo Sol
- Ēma
- Gus' Sip and Dip
- Il Porcellino
- Joe's Seafood Prime Steak & Stone Crab - an offshoot of Joe's Stone Crab in Miami
- L. Woods
- Miru, St. Regis Chicago
- Mon Ami Gabi
- Osteria Via Stato
- Pizzeria Portofino
- Pizzeria Via Stato
- R.J. Grunt's
- Ramen-San
- RPM Italian
- RPM Seafood
- RPM Steak
- Saranello
- Shaw's Crab House
- Stella Barra Pizzeria Santa Monica
- Summer House (Las Vegas)
- Sushi-San
- Tallboy Taco
- The Dalcy
- The Oakville Grill & Cellar
- Three Dots and a Dash
- Tokio Pub
- Tre Dita, St. Regis Chicago
- Twin City Grill
- Wildfire
- For a more up-to-date and accurate list, please consider viewing Lettuce Entertain You's Webpage Restaurants

=== Sold/divested restaurants ===
- Corner Bakery Cafe
- Maggiano's Little Italy
- Petterino's
- Krispy Kreme (franchise)
- Wow Bao

=== Closed restaurants ===
- A 1 Beanery
- Reel Club
- Nacional 27
- Magic Pan Crepe Stand
- Frankie's Scaloppine & Fifth Floor Pizzeria
- Hub 51
- Mity Nice Grill
- Foodlife
- Don & Charlie's
- Papagus Greek Taverna
- Tru (restaurant), closed 2017
- L2O, closed 2014
- Fritz That's It
- Lawrence of Oregano
- Jonathan Livingston Seafood
- Oyster Bah
- Naoki Sushi
- M Burger
- Ben Pao
- Scoozi!
- Stella Barra Pizzeria Chicago
- Stella Barra Pizzeria Hollywood
- Tucci Benucch
- Intro
- The Eccentric
- Hat Dance
- Great Gritzbe's Flying Food Show
- Un Grand Cafe
- RJ Grunts (Glenview location)
- Everest
- Community Canteen
- Stripburger
- Vongs Thai Kitchen

== See also ==
- Rick Tramonto
- Laurent Gras
- Jean Joho
- Thai Dang
