= Thomas Sakmar =

American physician-scientist (born 1956)

Thomas P. Sakmar
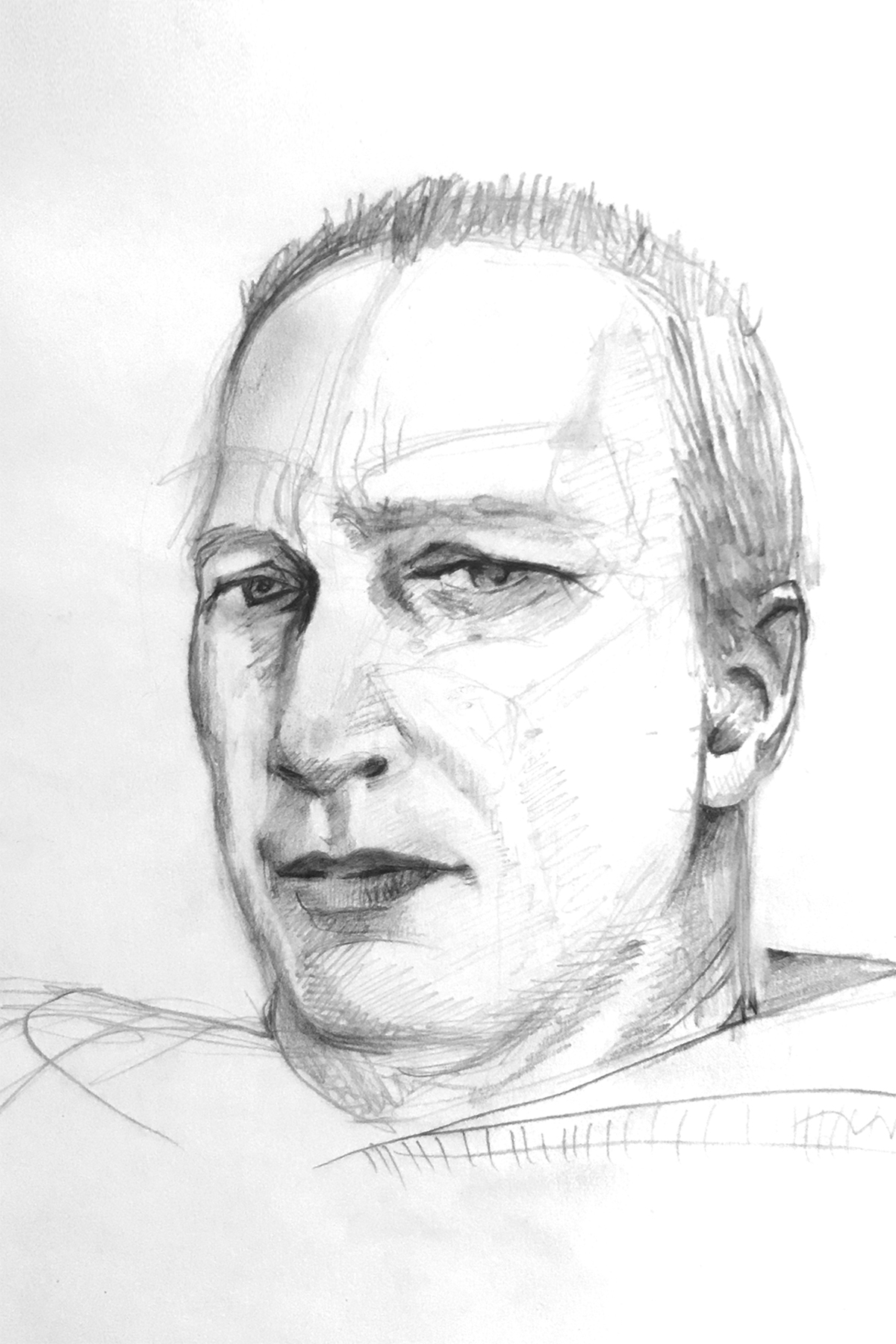
- Sakmar in 2015

Acting President of The Rockefeller University
- In office February 11, 2002 – September 1, 2003
- Preceded by: Arnold J. Levine
- Succeeded by: Sir Paul Nurse

Personal details
- Born: 1956 (age 69–70) Detroit, Michigan
- Children: 3
- Education: University of Chicago, Massachusetts Institute of Technology
- Scientific career
- Known for: Spectral tuning, G protein-coupled receptors
- Awards: Honorary Doctorate from Karolinska Institute (2020)
- Fields: Chemical biology
- Workplaces: The Rockefeller University; Massachusetts General Hospital; Massachusetts Institute of Technology; University of Chicago Pritzker School of Medicine; University of Chicago
- Doctoral advisor: H. Gobind Khorana
- Other academic advisors: Bruce Merrifield

Thomas P. Sakmar (born 1956) is an American physician-scientist and the former acting president of The Rockefeller University. Prior to becoming acting president he was associate dean for graduate studies in the Tri-Institutional MD–PhD Program.

Sakmar earned his A.B. in chemistry from University of Chicago and in 1982 received his M.D. from University of Chicago Pritzker School of Medicine. He carried out clinical training in internal medicine at Massachusetts General Hospital and postdoctoral training with H. Gobind Khorana at the Massachusetts Institute of Technology before starting the laboratory of molecular biology and biochemistry at The Rockefeller University in 1990.

With 200 peer-reviewed research articles he is best known for his work on spectral tuning in photopigments and for developing drug discovery methods targeting G protein-coupled receptors. He has been a senior fellow of the Ellison Medical Foundation, an investigator of the Howard Hughes Medical Institute, the Marie Krogh Visiting Professor at the Novo Nordisk Foundation Center for Basic Metabolic Research at the University of Copenhagen as well as guest professor at the Karolinska Institute in Stockholm, Sweden.

In 2020 he was awarded an honorary doctorate (honoris causa) from Karolinska Institute.

Academic offices
Preceded by Arnold J. Levine	Acting President of Rockefeller University; Feb. 2002-Sept. 2003	Succeeded by Sir Paul Nurse
