= Laurent Gras (chef) =

French-born chef (born 1965)

- Born: May 3, 1965 (age 61); Antibes, France
- Occupation: Chef

Laurent Gras (born May 3, 1965, in Antibes, France) is a French-born chef currently living and working in the United States.

== In France ==
Gras's career began in his native France where he worked at several top Michelin-rated establishments, including: Lucas Carton, where he was chef de partie under Alain Senderens; Restaurant Guy Savoy, where he was chef de cuisine; Hotel de Paris Monaco, where he was chef de cuisine under Alain Ducasse; and Restaurant Alain Ducasse Paris, where he was the opening chef de cuisine.

== In the United States ==
Gras's American debut was in 1997 at Peacock Alley in New York's Waldorf-Astoria Hotel, where, as Executive Chef, he received a three star review from Ruth Reichl of The New York Times. He spent four successful years there before moving to San Francisco, where he was named the Executive Chef of the Fifth Floor. His work at the Fifth Floor was received with critical accolades including San Francisco Magazine’s Chef of the Year and Best New Restaurant 2002, Food & Wine Magazine’s Best New Chef 2002, and he was featured on the cover of Gourmet Magazine in 2003.

Gras opened his first restaurant in Chicago, L_{2}O, in May 2008. The restaurant received Esquire's Restaurant of the Year award, and a nomination for Best New Restaurant from the James Beard Foundation Award. In November 2010, the newly published Michelin Guide for Chicago gave the restaurant three stars, its top rating. At the same time, Gras announced his departure from the restaurant. Later, he was the co-executive chef of two Michelin starred Saison in San Francisco.

== Cookbooks ==
In August 2012, Gras released his first cookbook as an interactive e-book. Laurent Gras: My Provence includes dishes from Gras's early years growing up and working as a chef on the Côte d'Azur. The digital cookbook was co-written with Mitchell Davis and features step-by-step photos, instructional videos, and chef tips. Laurent Gras: My Provence was awarded the 2013 International Association of Culinary Professionals (IACP) Judges Choice Cookbook Award and the New Media Award for Intriguing Use of Technology.

== Cycling ==
Gras is a member of the Foundation Cycling New York amateur racing team.
