= Rich Melman =

American restaurateur (born 1942)

- Born: 1942 (age 83–84); United States
- Occupation: Chairman of Lettuce Entertain You Enterprises
- Spouse: Martha Melman
- Website: www.leye.com/company/rich.htm

Rich Melman (born 1942) is an American businessman, and the founder and chairman of Lettuce Entertain You Enterprises, a privately held restaurant company with more than 100 venues.

In 1971, Melman and Jerry A. Orzoff founded R.J. Grunts in Lincoln Park in Chicago. Melman and Orzoff continued their partnership, developing a number of restaurants, until Orzoff died in 1981. Melman continued his philosophy of "partnership" and now has 37 working partners.

== Early life ==
Melman grew up in a Jewish family in Chicago. As a child, he sold ice cream and peanuts at Chicago beaches and even sold eggs door to door. He unsuccessfully attended three different colleges. At 14, he started working for the family restaurant business. After his father rebuffed his inquiries to buy into the partnership, he struck out on his own. Persistence led him to Orzoff, who was the first businessperson to take him seriously.

== Lettuce Entertain You ==
By 1988, Lettuce Entertain You encompassed 27 restaurants and yielded approximately $90 million. Some of their best-known restaurants include Joe's Seafood, Prime Steak, & Stone Crab, Ed Debevic's, Wildfire Grill, Mon Ami Gabi, Beatrix and RPM Italian. On January 1, 2000, he passed the title and duties of chief executive to Steve Ottmann. In 2003, Kevin Brown assumed the CEO role. The separate consulting business has served McDonald's Corp., Chart House and Popeyes Chicken & Biscuits. In fact, it was instrumental in the development of Popeyes Cajun Kitchen.

== Family ==
He is the father of two sons and a daughter – R.J., Jerrod, and Molly, who all work in the company. His wife is Martha.
