= Winthrop-Sears Medal =

The Winthrop-Sears Medal is awarded annually by The Chemists' Club of New York in conjunction with the Science History Institute (formerly the Chemical Heritage Foundation) to recognize entrepreneurial achievement in the chemical industry for the betterment of humanity.

Some of the past Winthrop-Sears medal winners include: William Wulfsohn (Ashland Global Holdings), Mario Nappa (Chemours), Peter McCausland (Airgas), Sol Barer (Celgene), Robert Gore (Gore-Tex), and Jon M. Huntsman (Huntsman Chemical Corporation).

== History ==
The Chemists’ Club was founded in 1898 and is the world’s longest serving International organization devoted to the furtherance of chemistry and related technologies. In the US, there were seven chemical societies, known as the Seven Sisters and The Chemists’ Club was alma mater to all of them: American sections of the Society of Chemical Industry, Verein Deutscher Chemiker and Société de Chimie Industrielle, and the American Chemical Society, the American Institute of Chemists, American Institute of Chemical Engineers, and Electrochemical Society; many of the Sisters were born at the Club and all were nurtured there as their memberships entirely overlapped with our Club.

The modern practice of honoring great accomplishments in chemistry originated simultaneously in Berlin and New York in 1903 when the Association of German Chemists and the German Chemical Society instituted both the Liebig Medal and the August Wilhelm von Hofmann Medal while The Chemists’ Club instituted the Nichols Medal and, in 1906, the Perkin Medal. Traditionally The Chemists’ Club facilitated and hosted these celebrations while one of The Sisters awarded the medals.

This arrangement continued for over a half century when, in 1970, The Club initiated The Winthrop-Sears Medal. This medal was named after two very early chemical industry pioneers, one of whom was John Winthrop the Younger, one of America’s earliest scientists who was elected Fellow of the Royal Society in 1662. He is also considered the Father of Connecticut because he convinced the British government to unite Saybrook, New Haven and River Colonies into a combined Connecticut Colony and then became popular Colonial Governor for many years.

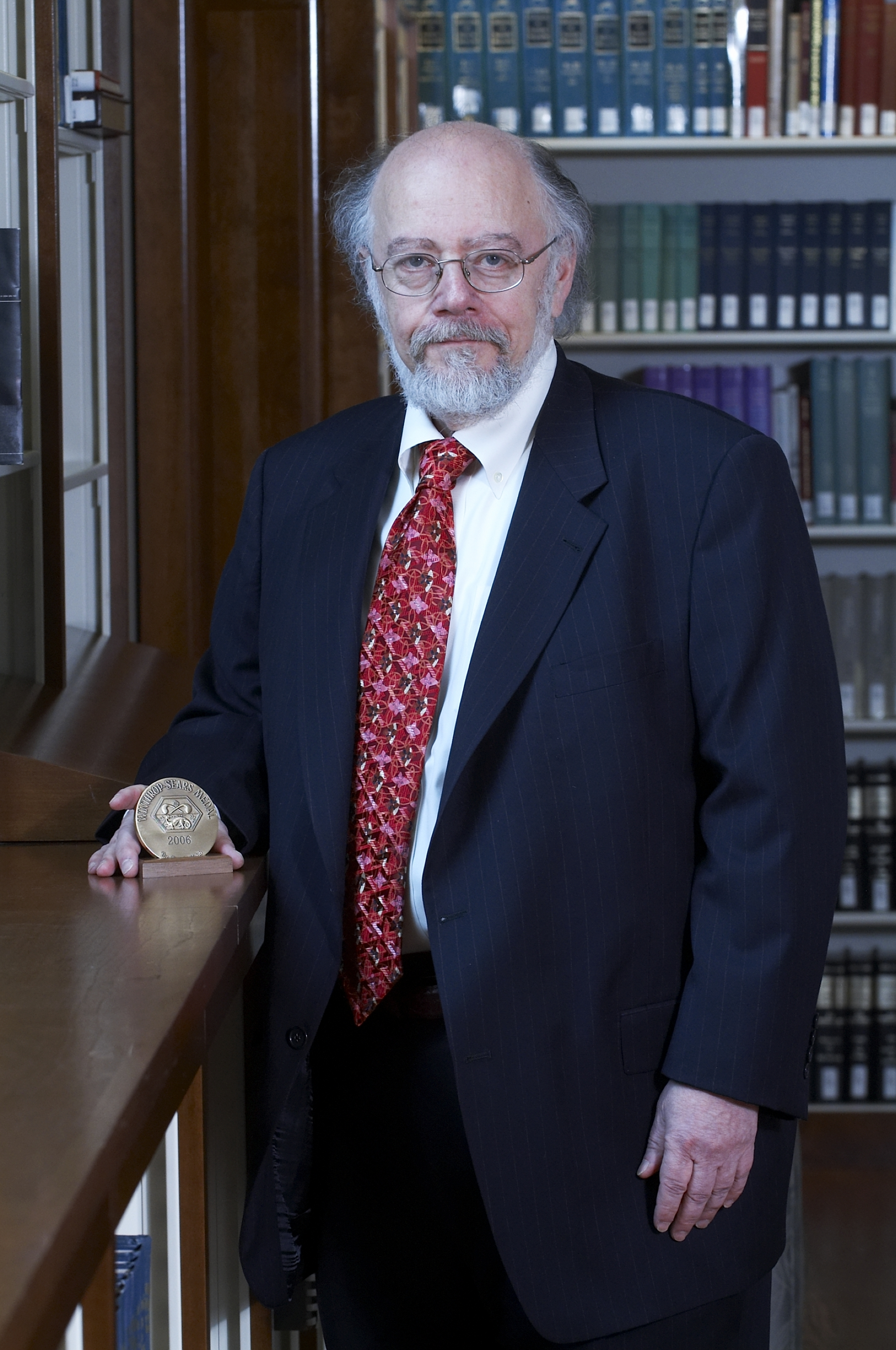
Sol J. Barer with the Winthrop-Sears Medal, 2006

== Selection process ==
The Winthrop-Sears Medal for Entrepreneurial Achievement recognized entrepreneurship that revitalized the chemical industry and betters humanity. The medal is presented each December at The Chemists’ Club annual Egg Nog Gala held at the New York Academy of Sciences (previously presented in association with the Chemical Heritage Foundation during the Chemical Heritage Foundation’s Heritage Day activities, in the spring of each year). The medal was established in 1970 to recognize individuals who, by their entrepreneurial achievement, have contributed to the vitality of the chemical industry and the betterment of humanity. The medal is named in honor of two of America’s earliest chemical entrepreneurs, John Winthrop, Jr., son of the first Governor of the Massachusetts Bay Colony and considered the first chemist in America, and John Sears, creator of the Massachusetts salt industry.

The recipient of the Winthrop-Sears medal is chosen through the Chemists’ Club’s designated nominating committee. The nominating committee consists of the President of the Chemists’ Club, one Past President of The Chemists’ Club, and two other members of The Chemists’ Club Board of Trustees, at minimum. The President selects the chair of the committee and may also name other participants to the committee who need not be members of The Chemists’ Club as well (the committee has previously included representatives from Societe de Chimie (America’s Section), SOCMA, and other industry affiliates/partners).

The nominating committee members each submit names of candidates whom they consider worthy of the Winthrop-Sears medal and the nominating committee members then come to a consensus on a prospective awardee. The prospective awardees are evaluated based on the impact of their contribution to the vitality of the chemical industry and the betterment of humanity over the past year, and their journey to their entrepreneurial achievement. Prospective awardees are not limited to c-suite professionals or chemistry-specific employees.

Once an awardee is nominated, the chair of the committee then notifies the prospective awardee of his/her nomination and the requirements for receiving the medal. If the prospective awardee accepts the nomination, the medal is presented to the nominee at the Chemists’ Club’s annual Egg Nog Gala where they deliver a brief address and accept the award. If the nominee rejects the award, the nominating committee then nominates their second choice nominee for the award and repeats the nominee notification process.

The remainder of the top three candidates selected by the nominating committee for the Winthrop-Sears medal that had not received the medal in the current year remain candidates for the medal for the following two years.

== Recipients ==
Source (2004–10):

- Undated: Emerson Kampen, Great Lakes Chemical (before 1995); Robert J. Milano of Millmaster (before 1976)
- 1970 ?
- 1971 Leonard Pool, Air Products
- 1972 Daniel James Terra, Lawter International Incorporated
- 1973–1975 ?
- 1976 Robert I. Wishnick, Witco Chemical
- 1977 Ralph Landau, Halcon International
- 1978 ?
- 1979 Robert H. Krieble, Loctite
- 1980 Alfred Bader, Sigma-Aldrich Corporation
- 1981 ?
- 1982 John T. Files, Merichem
- 1983 ?
- 1984 George Gregory
- 1985 Charles R. and Lucia Shipley, Shipley Company (Rohm and Haas Electronic)
- 1986 Paul M. Cook, Raychem
- 1987 ?
- 1988 Gordon A. Cain, Sterling Chemicals
- 1989 ?
- 1990 Arthur Mendolia and Cyril Baldwin, Cambrex
- 1991–1993 ?
- 1994 Jon M. Huntsman, Huntsman Chemical Corp
- 1995 Harold A. Sorgenti, ARCO
- 1996 John W. Johnstone, Jr., Olin
- 1996–2001 ?
- 2002 James Mack, Cambrex
- 2003 Robert W. Gore, W. L. Gore & Associates (Gore-Tex)
- 2004 George Rosenkranz and Alejandro Zaffaroni, Syntex
- 2005 Herbert W. Boyer, Genentech
- 2006 Sol J. Barer, Celgene
- 2007 Phillip Allen Sharp, Biogen
- 2008 Haldor Topsøe, Haldor Topsøe
- 2009 Zsolt Rumy, Zoltek
- 2010 Peter McCausland, Airgas
- 2011 ?
- 2012 ?
- 2013 Joel S. Marcus, Alexandria Real Estate Equities
- 2014 Scott Power, Dupont
- 2015 Mario Nappa, Chemours
- 2016 John Panicella, Solenis
- 2017 Heinz Holler, The Dow Chemical Company
- 2018 George Corbin, Solvay
- 2019 William Wulfson, Ashland Global Holdings
- 2020 Linda Rendle, The Clorox Company

== See also ==
- List of business and industry awards
- List of chemistry awards
- List of prizes named after people
