= Terri Kelly =

American engineer

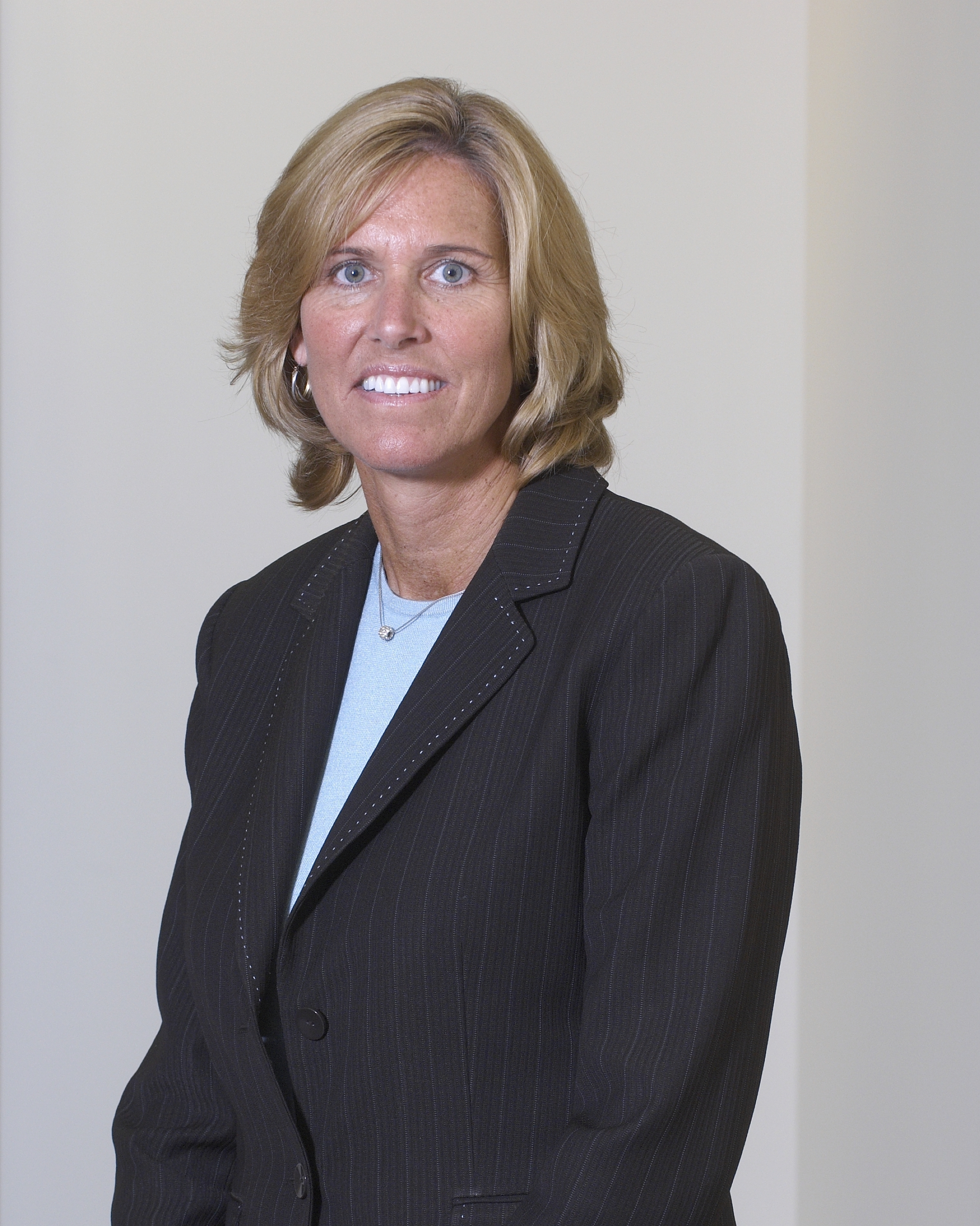
- Kelly during her tenure as CEO of W. L. Gore & Associates
- Born: 1961 (age 64–65)
- Education: University of Delaware (BS)
- Occupations: Mechanical engineer, Corporate Executive
- Employer(s): W. L. Gore & Associates (1982–2018); Microsoft (Board Director); United Airlines (Board Director)
- Known for: CEO of W. L. Gore & Associates; Expertise in "lattice" management structures
- Title: President and CEO (2005–2018)
- Awards: University of Delaware Wall of Fame (2011); Women’s Hall of Fame of Delaware (2014)
- Website: www.gore.com

Terri Connor Kelly is an American engineer. A member of the National Academy of Engineering, she was the president of the American company W. L. Gore & Associates from 2005 to 2018.

== Biography ==
In 1983, she obtained her bachelor's degree in mechanical engineering from the University of Delaware, and she joined W. L. Gore & Associates as a mechanical engineer in the Fabrics Division, She had chosen such a company smaller than DuPont for better career prospects. At the company, she worked on their dealings of their Gore-Tex uniforms with the United States Department of Defense. In 1997, Michael Kaplan of Fast Company said of Kelly: "If you’ve nicknamed your boss the Walking Plague, [she] is a woman you will envy: she’s never had a boss", noting the company's consensus-based leadership.

After joining the Fabrics Division leadership in 1998, she oversaw the opening of Gore-Tex's first textile manufacturing plant in China, located in Shenzhen. In 2005, she became president and CEO of W. L. Gore after being put on the company's shortlist. In April 2018, she stepped down from both positions.

In 2009, she joined the University of Delaware Board of Trustees, later becoming their vice-chair. She became chair on July 1, 2022. She has also served as a board member for ASML Holding, the Nemours Foundation, and United Rentals, as well as a trustee for the Alfred I. duPont Testamentary Trust and Unidel Foundation.

She was elected to the National Academy of Engineering in 2021, for "leadership in product development and commercialization by advancing management practices that foster innovation."

She has four children with her husband John Kelly. The couple are also philanthropists known by the nickname "Double Dels", with their donations including the Terri Connor Kelly and John Kelly Career Development Professor of Mechanical Engineering and the John B. and Terri L. Kelly Athletic Scholarship.
