= EZF =

Kumar Bapi

- Electric Zoo Festival, a music festival in New York
- Raychem EZF, a coaxial cable “F” connector
- EZF stands for Zero Franc Economic Entrepreneur Model created by Dr. Samuel Mathey and Professor Bruno Bernard introduced in Africa by FAFEDE
