= Paul M. Cook =

American businessman (1924–2020)

- Born: April 25, 1924; Ridgewood, New Jersey, U.S.
- Died: December 14, 2020 (aged 96)
- Education: Massachusetts Institute of Technology
- Awards: Winthrop-Sears Medal from the Chemical Industry Association (1986) National Medal of Technology (1988) Bay Area Council's Bay Area Business Hall of Fame Award (1999) SRI's Weldon B. "Hoot" Gibson Achievement Award (2008)
- Scientific career
- Workplaces: SRI International; Raychem

Paul M. Cook (April 25, 1924 – December 14, 2020) was an American businessman who was the founder and CEO of Raychem, a chemical manufacturing company that reached $2 billion in annual revenue. In 1988, he was awarded the National Medal of Technology "[f]or his vision and entrepreneurial efforts, his technical accomplishments and his business and technical leadership as the key contributor in creating a worldwide chemically based industry."

== Early life and education ==
Paul Cook took an early interest in chemistry, and developed a chemistry lab in the basement of his parents' home. After he graduated high school in 1941, he started at the Massachusetts Institute of Technology (MIT), studying chemical engineering under Warren K. Lewis.

In 1943, Cook enlisted in the United States Army and enrolled in the Army Specialized Training Program; through that program, he attended Stanford University for two terms, studying mechanical engineering. Cook was then sent to Hunter Liggett Military Reservation and then Fort Benning, where he completed Officer Candidate School. He was then sent to fight in Italy. Cook served in combat with the 10th Mountain Division.

In 1946, Cook left the army and worked for Submarine Signal in Boston. He then returned to MIT and completed his Bachelor of Science in 1947.

== Career ==
Cook was one of SRI International's earliest employees, joining the organization in 1948 as its 48th employee. He went on to lead SRI's Radiation Chemistry Laboratory, where he was interested in using high-energy electrons to alter polymers.

In 1951, Cook founded the Sequoia Process Corporation; he left that after five years to found Raychem, which opened in 1957, and focused on commercial applications for radiochemistry. He served as Raychem's CEO and chairman of the board.

Cook founded other companies, including CellNet Data Systems, DIVA Systems (1995), and Promptu.

== Awards and memberships ==
Cook served on SRI International's board of directors for nine years and served as its chairman for six of those.

In 1986, he was awarded the Winthrop-Sears Medal from the Chemical Industry Association. In 1988, Ronald Reagan awarded him the National Medal of Technology.

He received the Bay Area Council's Bay Area Business Hall of Fame Award in 1999, and SRI's Weldon B. "Hoot" Gibson Achievement Award in 2008.
