= Newton High School (Ohio) =

Coordinates: 40°03′17″N 84°20′28″W

Location
- 201 N. Long St. Pleasant Hill, Ohio 45359

Information
- Type: Public
- School district: Newton Local School District
- Principal: Danielle Davis
- Teaching staff: 18.25 (FTE)
- Grades: 7-12
- Enrollment: 264 (2023–2024)
- Student to teacher ratio: 14.47
- Color
- Athletics conference: Western Ohio Athletic Conference
- Sports: Cross Country, Golf, Soccer, Volleyball, Basketball, Baseball, Softball, Track
- Nickname: Indians
- Website: https://www.newton.k12.oh.us/

Newton Local High School is a public high school in Pleasant Hill, Ohio. It is the only high school in the Newton Local School District.

Newton High School is the center of Pleasant Hill, Ohio, and is located at 201 N. Long St. The old school building was constructed in the 1920s, but was demolished in 2010, and a new one was built in its place.

== Ohio High School Athletic Association State Championships ==
- Girls Softball - 2010

== Notable alumni ==
- Roy J. Plunkett
