= Robert W. Gore =

American scientist and businessman (1937–2020)

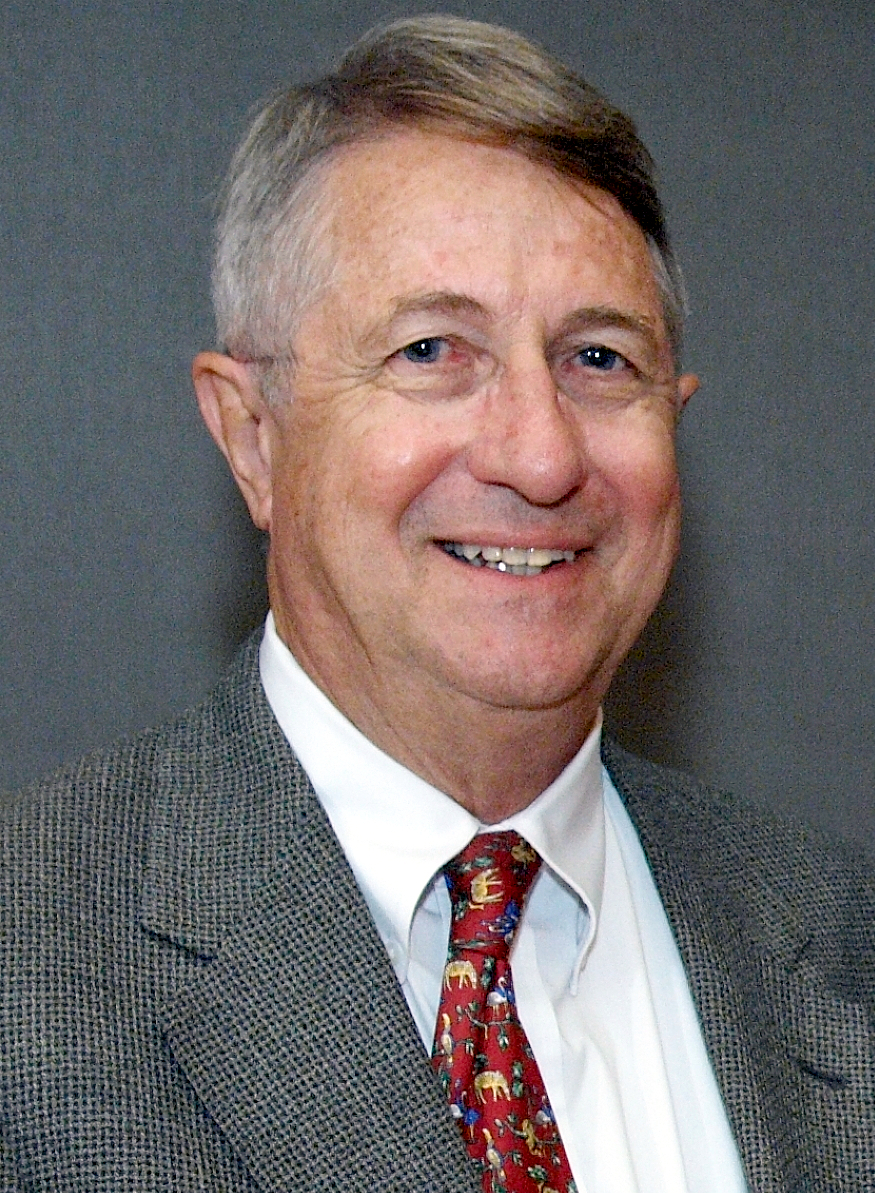
- Gore in 2005
- Born: April 15, 1937; Salt Lake City, Utah, U.S.
- Died: September 17, 2020 (aged 83); Earleville, Maryland, U.S.
- Education: University of Delaware, University of Minnesota
- Father: Bill Gore
- Scientific career
- Fields: Chemical engineering
- Workplaces: W. L. Gore & Associates

External videos
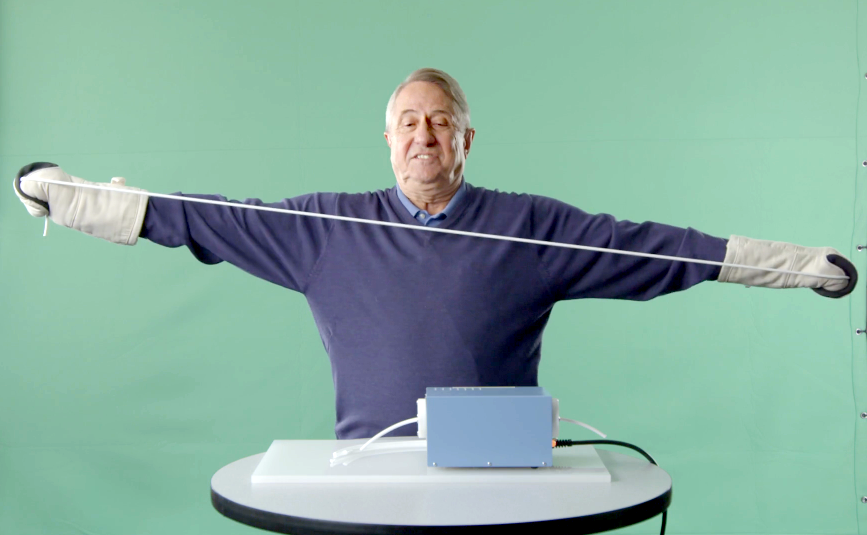
- "I decided to give one of these rods a huge stretch, fast, a jerk... and it stretched 1000%", Scientists You Must Know: Bob Gore, Science History Institute

Robert W. Gore (April 15, 1937 – September 17, 2020) was an American engineer and scientist, inventor and businessman. Gore led his family's company, W. L. Gore & Associates, which was founded by his father Bill Gore, in developing applications of polytetrafluoroethylene (PTFE) ranging from computer cables to medical equipment to the outer layer of space suits. His most significant breakthrough was likely the invention of Gore-Tex, a waterproof and breathable fabric popularly known for its use in sporting and outdoor gear.

== Early life and education ==
Robert Gore was born in Salt Lake City, Utah on April 15, 1937, to Wilbert "Bill" and Genevieve "Vieve" Gore. His family relocated to near Newark, Delaware in 1950, to be near his father's work at the DuPont Experimental Station in Wilmington, Delaware. The Gore family stayed with friends for several months while Bob's father built their house. Bob attended school in Newark beginning in eighth grade.

Gore graduated with a bachelor's degree in chemical engineering at the University of Delaware in 1959. With his wife and son, he moved to University Village in September 1959 to attend graduate school. He completed his graduate studies at the University of Minnesota, earning an MS and then a PhD in chemical engineering in 1963.

== Creating a product: Multi-Tet Cable ==
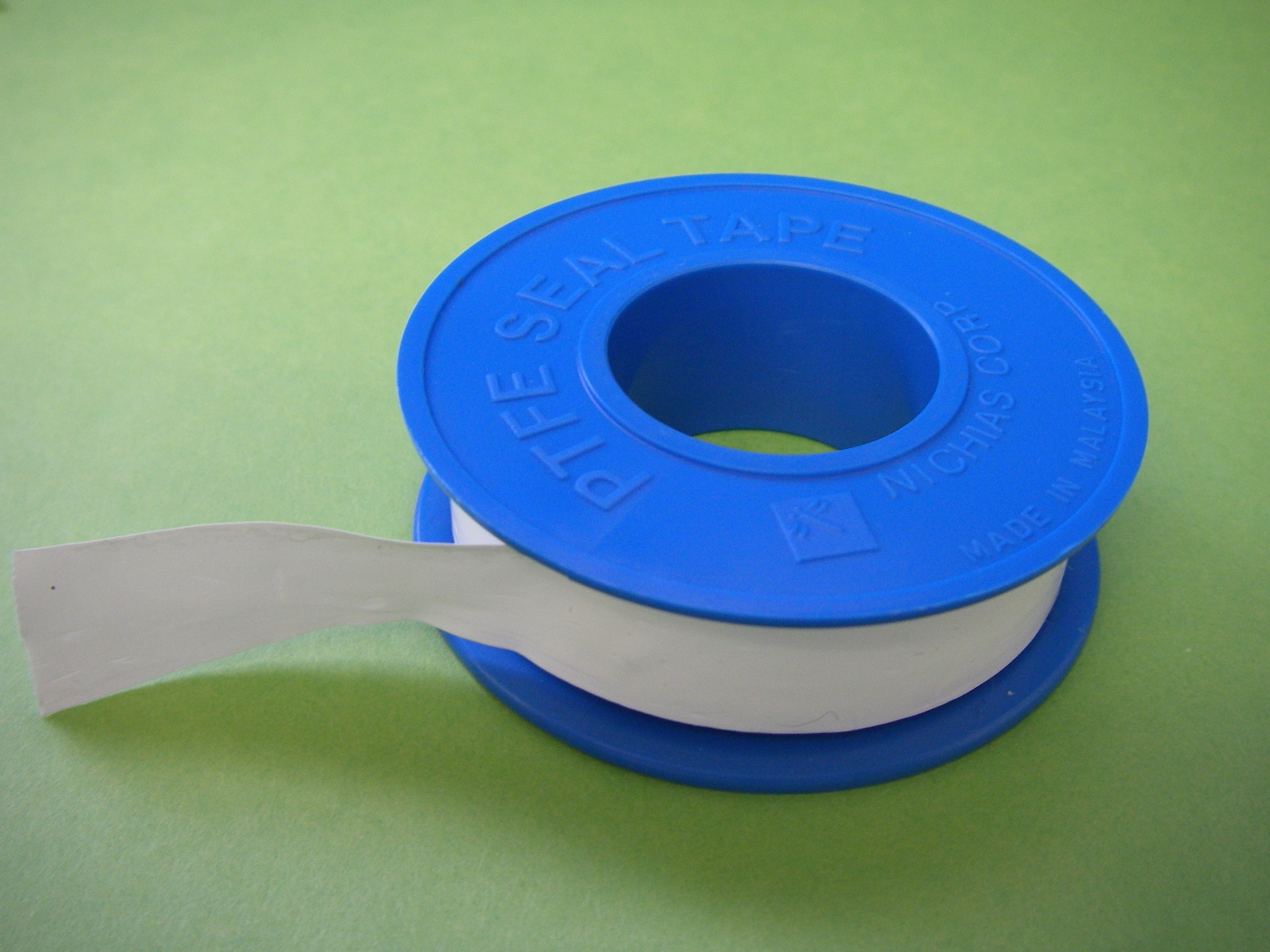
White PTFE seal tape

While his father Bill Gore was working for DuPont, he was also experimenting at home with DuPont materials such as Teflon polytetrafluoroethylene (Teflon PTFE). He wanted to insulate electrical wires using PTFE, but attempts to coat wire with powdered PTFE did not produce a consistent coating. In April 1957, while Bob was still a sophomore at Delaware, Bill showed him around his home lab and explained the problem he was having.

Bob suggested surrounding the wire with a different form of PTFE, a white tape that was already of uniform thickness. His father expected that the PTFE tape would not stick to the wire, but he tried the idea, and it worked. Wires were laid between layers of PTFE tape and sent through a grooved calender roll, then heated to melt the tape into a coherent coating. The result was a PTFE-insulated ribbon cable containing multiple copper conductors, later called "Multi-Tet Cable".

== W. L. Gore & Associates ==
Solution of this technical problem was significant, and enabled Gore's parents, Bill and Genevieve, to create W. L. Gore & Associates in 1958. For the first two years, the business was run out of the basement of the Gore home. Robert Gore lived upstairs with his parents, other family members, and employees of the company. At one point 13 of the 16 people working for the company lived in the Gore home.

As stated in a 1960 brochure, the company "was established for the purpose of developing and utilizing technology in the field of fluorocarbon polymers, especially polytetrafluoroethylene", materials which "have a great and undeveloped potential to contribute value to society."

Multi-Tet cable was the breakout product for the new company. Bob Gore was listed as the inventor when W. L. Gore & Associates registered its first patent in 1958, for what was then called "Multiconductor Wiring Strip". Multi-tet cable was eventually used in the IBM System/360 and other computers and in communications and process control equipment. The company provided cables for the Surveyor satellites and Apollo space craft. During the Apollo 11 space mission, astronauts used a Gore cable to connect their ship to a seismograph placed on the surface of the Moon.

Bob Gore was elected to the board of directors of W. L. Gore & Associates in June 1961, while still a student at the University of Minnesota.

== Expansion ==
After receiving his PhD in chemical engineering in 1963, Gore joined W. L. Gore & Associates as a research associate. In 1967, he became the company's technical and research leader.

=== Inventing Gore-Tex ===
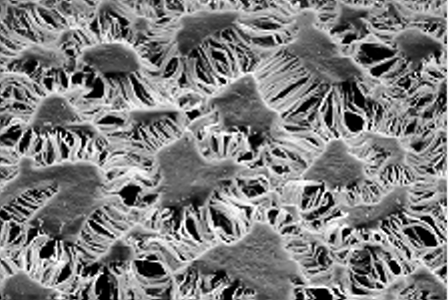
Gore-Tex membrane under an electron microscope

In 1969, Gore was researching a process for stretching extruded PTFE into pipe thread tape when he discovered that the polymer could be "expanded" into a porous form of PTFE, characterized by extremely high strength and porosity. He and others had attempted to stretch rods of PTFE by about 10%. His discovery of the right conditions for stretching PTFE was a happy accident, born partly of frustration. Instead of slowly stretching the heated material, he applied a sudden, accelerating yank. The solid PTFE unexpectedly stretched about 800%, forming a microporous structure that was about 70% air.

A patent application for expanded PTFE was filed on May 21, 1970, and eventually two separate patents were issued, one for the product, and another for the processes for making the product.

Gore continued to investigate the properties of the new material, studying the effectiveness of different PTFE resins. He also worked with others to develop techniques for stretching the material both one-dimensionally, to create long filaments, and two-dimensionally, to create sheets of the membrane. Two-dimensional stretching created sheets with greater strength, porosity, and air flow, opening up possibilities for many new applications.

By 1971, Gore was experimenting with laminates, combining the stretched membrane with supporting materials for added strength. Based on this work, the company developed a waterproof laminate called expanded polytetrafluoroethylene (ePTFE), now trademarked as Gore-Tex.

=== Medical applications ===
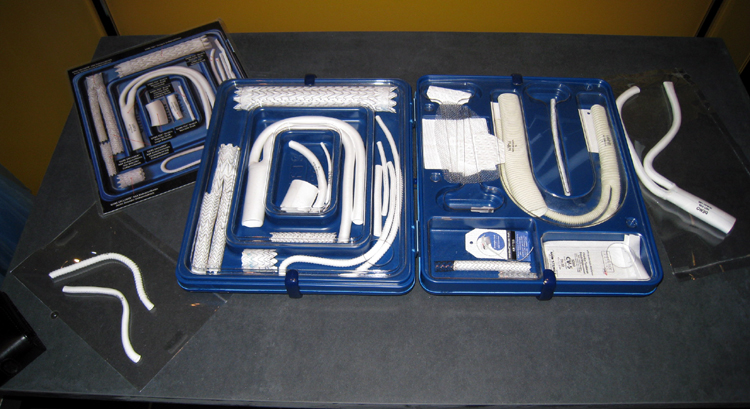
Gore-Tex Medical Devices Sample Kit, Science History Institute

Some of the company's earliest successful products, based on work with laminates, were burn bandages developed for the Park-Davis company, microfiltration products for Millipore Corporation, and a membrane for blood oxygenation for Baxter International. Creating Gore-Tex tubes for use as vascular grafts was another area of rapid development.

Gore-Tex is particularly useful internally in medical applications because it is nearly inert inside the body. In addition, the porosity of Gore-Tex permits the body's own tissue to grow through the material, integrating grafted material into the circulation system.

=== Waterproof fabric ===
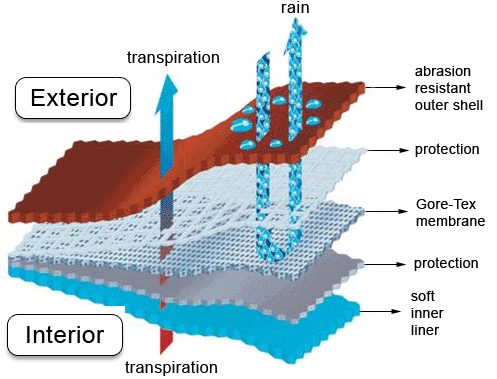
Construction of Gore-Tex clothing

More popularly, Gore-Tex is known for its use as a waterproof, breathable fabric, used in outdoor clothing and sport footwear. To the human eye, it looks and feels like a smooth fabric. Structurally, the membrane of the fabric contains about nine-billion microscopic pores per square inch. The holes are large enough to allow body heat and water vapour to escape, but small enough to deflect water drops. As a result, moisture from rain or snow cannot penetrate the fabric, while perspiration can escape as it evaporates.

The first report of using Gore-Tex to make waterproof, breathable garments appeared in a market report, April 13, 1972. The manufacturing process was patented in 1972. The first commercial sales of Gore-Tex were made in 1976 when Early Winters, Ltd., began making and selling Gore-Tex tents. The next year Early sold Gore-Tex rainwear.

Gore-Tex is typically placed between an outer fabric and an inner lining. The material allows moisture to pass easily from one layer through the next, a process known as wicking. This, and a polymer coating that increases the ability of the fabric to repel water, reduce the chance that the wearer will become damp, cold, or a victim of heat loss. In 1989, Gore began to license manufacturers to use the Gore-Tex material and label: however, products must survive rigorous testing in the Gore company's rain room, abrasion tests and washing machines to be authorized for market release.

=== Executive role ===
Gore became president and CEO of the company in 1976, replacing his father. The company retained its base in Newark, Delaware, but expanded worldwide. Ongoing work has developed Gore's initial ideas and resulted in four main areas of focus for the company: divisions for fabrics, medical, industrial, and electronic products. The organization's innovative managerial style has been a subject of study.

In 2000, Gore stepped down as president, becoming chairman, a position he held until 2016.

== Personal life ==
Gore married his second wife Sarah Louise "Sally" (née Ives) Coons in late 1977, which ended and he later married third wife Jane (née Arnold in 2012, who survived him in 2020. Chris Coons is a stepson from his marriage to Sally.

Gore died on September 17, 2020, in Earleville, Maryland.

He was survived by three sons Scott, Tom, and Brian Gore, one daughter, Sharon Rubin, six stepchildren, 28 grandchildren, and 11 great-grandchildren.

He has four siblings, including Susan Gore, who founded Wyoming Liberty Group in 2008.

=== Philanthropy ===
A major focus of philanthropy for Gore was his alma maters, the University of Delaware and the University of Minnesota. He served on the board of trustees as an emeritus member from 1992 to 2010 and as vice chairman from 1999 to 2007. He and other members of the Gore family have made a number of gifts to Delaware. These include:

- $18.5 million from the Gore family in the 1990s for the construction of Gore Hall
- $1 million in 2001 to establish a First-Year Graduate Student Fellowship Initiative in Chemical Engineering & Materials Science at the University of Minnesota
- $1 million in 2005 to fund the Genevieve W. Gore Recital Hall in the Roselle Center for the Arts
- $1 million in 2011 to establish the Robert W. Gore Fellowship in the College of Engineering
- $10 million in 2012 for a 40,000-square-foot addition to Amundson Hall on the University of Minnesota Twin Cities campus, known as the "Gore Annex"
- $10 million in 2013 for a 194,000-square-foot interdisciplinary science and engineering lab, to be known as "Bob and Jane Gore Research Laboratories".

== Awards ==
Gore was elected to the National Academy of Engineering in 1995 for his technical achievements. In 2003, Gore was awarded the Winthrop-Sears Medal in recognition of "entrepreneurial achievement that contributes to the vitality of the chemical industry and the betterment of mankind". In 2005, he received the Perkin Medal, awarded for "contributions to the improvement of the quality of life and the world competitiveness of the U.S. economy". In recognition of his work in developing Gore-Tex, Gore was inducted into the American National Inventors Hall of Fame in 2006.

Gore received an honorary doctorate from Heriot-Watt University in 2001.

== Patents ==
Gore held nine patents for his work with fluoropolymers.

- U.S. patent 3,953,566
