= Dominique Trempont =

American business executive

- Born: May 1954 (age 72); Belgium
- Education: University of Louvain, INSEAD
- Occupation: Business executive

Dominique Trempont is an American business executive and board member in large multinational high tech companies and start-ups. He was born in Belgium. Trempont is located in Silicon Valley and serves on the board of directors of private and public companies, with a strategic focus on disruptive technologies, emerging markets and Asia.

Companies include: Energy Recovery Inc a cleantech company that makes desalination equipment. RealNetworks (NASDAQ: RNWK - $400M) that is in on-line entertainment (video, music, SMS, ringtones, games). The Daily Mail and General trust (London Stock Exchange DMGT.L – £2.1B), a B2B and B2C media company, focused on content and publishing apps. ON24 ($70M - private), a software as a service company, webcasting and virtual shows. And Trion Worlds, a private Online Gaming company.

Trempont also teaches a Building Businesses course in Silicon Valley at the INSEAD Business School. Trempont is a patent holder using artificial intelligence for a distributed customer relationship management systems and methods US 20020133392 A1.

== Early life and education ==
Trempont was born in Belgium in 1954. He obtained a BA in business administration and software engineering from the University of Louvain, Belgium and a master of business administration (MBA) from INSEAD, and.

== Career ==
He spent the first 14 years of his career as a key executive at Raychem, a company focusing in material science and a precursor of the cleantech space, with worldwide responsibilities and a focus on large scale turnarounds in the United States, China, India, Japan, Latin America and Europe. Raychem was a billion dollar company operating globally in 80 countries and was later acquired by Tyco.

In 1993, Steve Jobs recruited Trempont to turn around NeXT, first as CFO then to lead operations, while Steve Jobs focused on Pixar. Dominique led NeXT's shift from hardware to Internet focused software and brought the company to profitability. He successfully restructured the company financially, organizationally and strategically, and sold NeXT to Apple in 1997 for $462M.

In 1997, Trempont became CEO of Gemplus Corp. He built a $150M new business in two years by focusing on the convergence of mobile consumer applications, micro-payments and on-line security. Gemplus has since gone public and has reached a valuation of $2 billion.

In 1999, Trempont became chairman and CEO of Kanisa, an early-stage enterprise natural language search & knowledge management software start-up. He focused the venture on customer self-service, contact center, and peer support applications. The company merged with ConsonaCRM in 2007.

Between 1996 and 1997, Trempont sat on the board of Verity (NASDAQ: VRTY), in enterprise search.

In 1998, Trempont became a founding investor in Signio, an online payment platform. Signio was sold to Verisign for $700M in 1999 and, a couple of years later, was acquired by eBay/PayPal.

In 2006, he joined the board and chaired the Finance and Audit Committee of 3Com (NASDAQ, COMS), a global computer networking solutions company; 3Com was acquired for $3.3B by Hewlett-Packard in 2010.
