= Wyoming Liberty Group =

American think tank

- Formation: 2008
- Type: 501(c)(3) organization
- Headquarters: Burns, Wyoming
- Location(s): P.O. Box 9 Burns, WY 82053
- Region served: Wyoming
- Founder: Susan Gore
- Budget: Revenue: $659,000; Expenses: $634,000 (FYE December 2023)
- Website: wyliberty.org

The Wyoming Liberty Group is a free market think tank in Wyoming, United States. Founded in 2008, the group says it is focused on "inviting citizens to prepare for informed, active and confident involvement in local and state government."

== Funding ==
The group was created and primarily funded by Susan Gore, an heiress of the W. L. Gore & Associates fortune.

== Activity ==
In 2011, the Wyoming Liberty Group criticized the American Recovery and Reinvestment Act of 2009, arguing that $400,000 had been spent for each job created.

Wyoming Liberty Group has argued against government expansion and for private sector solutions, arguing the European welfare state is detrimental to freedom and individual development.

In 2015, the Wyoming Liberty Group launched a national group, the Pillar of Law Institute. The group's aim is to fight restrictive campaign finance laws, which it characterizes as a free speech issue.
