= Raychem =

American chemical company (1957-1999)

Raychem Corporation
- Industry: Aerospace, Automotive, Telecommunications
- Founded: 1957
- Founder: Paul Cook, James B. Meikle, and Richard W. Muchmore
- Defunct: 1999
- Successor: TE Connectivity
- Headquarters: Menlo Park, California, United States
- Area served: Worldwide
- Products: Radiation chemistry, heat-shrink tubing, touchscreens

The Raychem Corporation was founded and headquartered in Menlo Park, California, in 1957 by Paul M. Cook, Bob Helprin, James B. Meikle, and Richard W. Muchmore. Led by Cook and second-in-command Robert M. Halperin, Raychem became a pioneer of commercial products realized through radiation chemistry.

== History ==
The original name of the company was RayTherm Wire and Cable, and it later formed a subsidiary named RayClad Tubes. The company changed names to avoid confusion with Raytheon. The company was a spin-off from SRI International, and their founding technology was wire and cable that used radiation cross-linked polymer insulation targeted at military and aerospace applications. This was the first known use of radiation chemistry for commercial products. The company soon invented heat-shrinkable tubing also targeted at electronic applications.

By 1980 the company had expanded to over 30 countries, including a major branch in Swindon, UK and made the Fortune 500 list. It was recognized as one of the fastest-growing companies in the United States at the time. The company had only three CEOs until it was acquired by Tyco International in 1999. Those CEOs were Paul Cook (Founder), Bob Saldich (a long-time Raychem executive, who also ran a Raychem subsidiary, RayNet) and Dick Kashnow, who was responsible for the sale of Raychem to Tyco.

At the time of the sale the company had reached sales exceeding $2 billion and was operating in over 60 countries globally. The company invented many breakthrough technologies, including PolySwitch PPTC circuit protection devices, and the touchscreen that became popular under the name Elo TouchSystems. The company's alumni populate many CEO and president positions in a variety of industries. The major market segments where Raychem operated were aerospace and defence, automotive, telecommunications, energy networks, consumer electronics and transportation.

== Fortune 500 rankings ==
Year	Fortune 500 Rank
1980	547
1981	490
1982	461
1983	435
1984	413
1985	405
1986	394
1987	359
1988	341
1989	315
1990	326
1991	317
1992	290
1993	295
1994	293

== Legacy ==
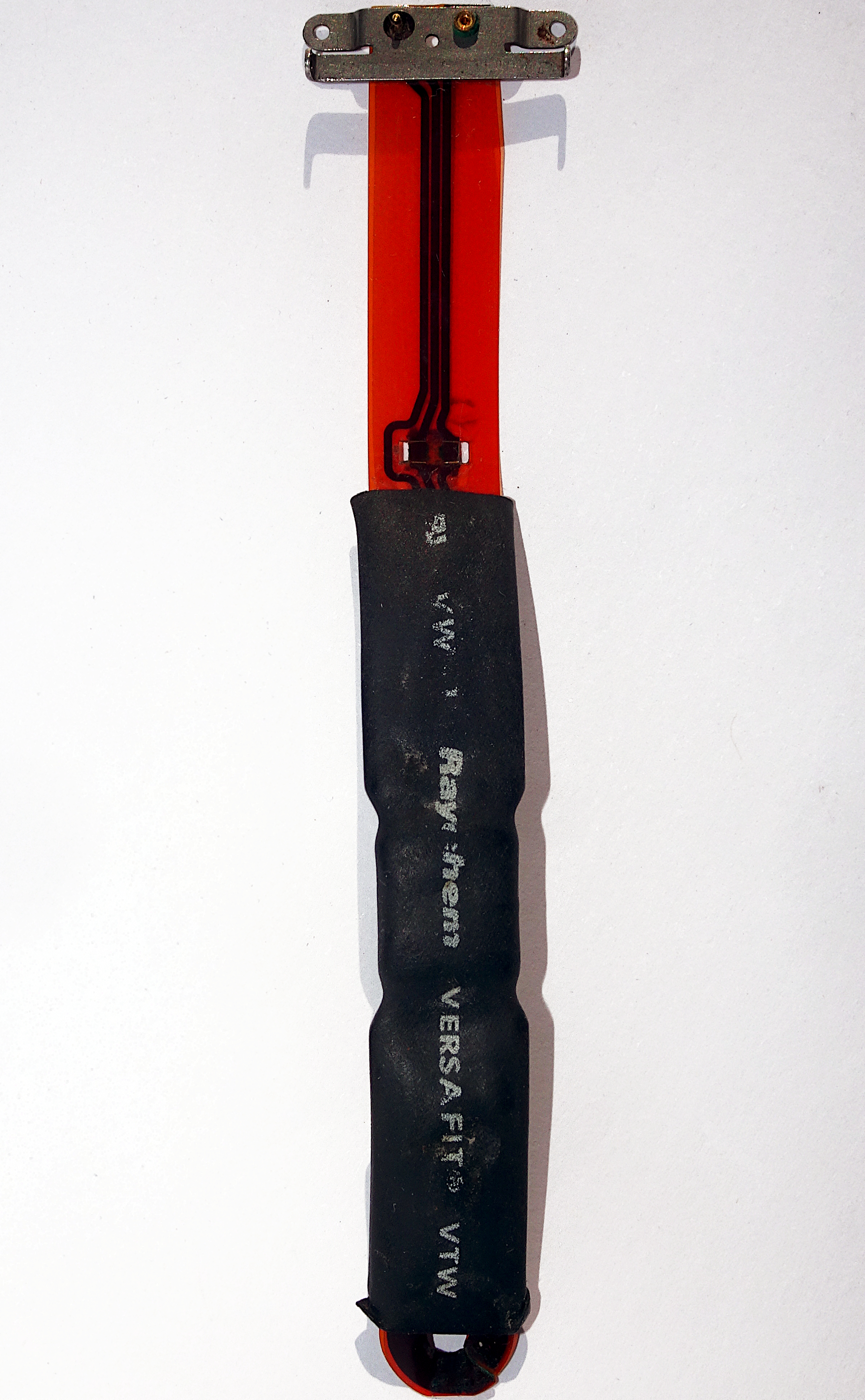
Raychem branded heat-shrink tubing on the antenna of Junghans Mega, 1991

Many products still carry the Raychem brand, being sold by two different companies: Tyco International split into three companies in 2007: Tyco International, TE Connectivity (Formerly Tyco Electronics) and Covidien. In 2012, Tyco International sold Tyco Thermal Controls to Pentair plc. Renamed Pentair Thermal Management, the group was spun off as a separate entity known as "Nvent Electric" in 2018. The Raychem thermal products was later purchased by Brookfield Asset Management and operated under the name "Chemelex" as of 2025. This group continues to provide customers with the Raychem brand name for industrial, commercial and residential trace heating solutions. TE Connectivity sells the other original Raychem products (shrink tubing, wire and cable, SolderSleeve Devices, etc.) under the Raychem brand name.

The Circuit Protection business unit, maker of PolySwitch devices, was sold to Littelfuse Corp. in 2016. Elotouch was sold to a private equity firm several years prior to that. TE Connectivity has multiple R&D Sites which include China & India. It operates in India through Raychem RPG, a 50:50 JV with 22000Cr + RPG Group. This Joint Venture specialises in Connection technologies up to 1200kV & has also introduced Speciality Low loss Transformers.

== See also ==
- Dominique Trempont, 14 years Raychem key executive
