= W. L. Gore & Associates =

American manufacturing company

W. L. Gore & Associates, Inc.
- Type: Private
- Founded: 1958
- Founders: Bill Gore and Vieve Gore
- Headquarters: Newark, Delaware, United States
- Key people: Bret Snyder, Chairman of the Board/President/CEO
- Revenue: $4.5 billion (2022)
- Number of employees: 12,000 (2022)
- Website: www.gore.com

W. L. Gore & Associates, Inc. is an American multinational manufacturing company specializing in products derived from fluoropolymers. It is a privately held corporation headquartered in Newark, Delaware. It is best known as the developer of waterproof, breathable Gore-Tex fabrics.

== History ==
The company was founded in 1958 by Wilbert (Bill) Lee Gore and his wife Genevieve (Vieve) Walton Gore in Newark. Bill Gore had spent 16 years with the DuPont Company in a number of technical positions that included fluoropolymer research when he decided to form his own company. While working in his basement, he set out to develop a process for insulating a series of parallel electrical wires using polytetrafluoroethylene (PTFE), a fluoropolymer discovered in 1938 by Roy Plunkett, a chemist with DuPont. His son, Robert W. Gore, in college at the time, suggested a method for encapsulating the wires which proved successful and led to the company's first patent. The resulting product was called Multi-Tet cable, a multi-conductor ribbon cable used in computers, communications, and process control equipment.

Bob Gore joined the company in 1963 upon completion of a Ph.D. in chemical engineering at the University of Minnesota. In 1969, he was researching a process for stretching extruded PTFE into pipe thread tape when he discovered that the polymer could be "expanded". The discovery followed a series of unsuccessful experiments in which he was attempting to stretch rods of PTFE by about 10%. As it turned out, the right conditions for stretching PTFE were counterintuitive. Instead of slowly stretching the heated material, he applied a sudden, accelerating yank that unexpectedly caused it to stretch about 800%. This resulted in the transformation of the solid PTFE into a microporous structure that was about 70% air. The company initially referred to this new material as "fibrillated PTFE". One year later, it was given the name of "Gore-Tex expanded PTFE". Today, expanded PTFE (ePTFE) accounts for the vast majority of the company's products.

In 1985, Bill Gore received the Prince Philip Award for Polymers in the Service of Mankind, which honored Gore's Medical Products Division. The award is given in recognition of polymers that have provided a significant service for mankind. In 2005, the Society of Chemical Industry presented Bob Gore with the Perkin Medal, which recognizes the most significant achievements in applied chemistry. In 2006, he was inducted into the National Inventors Hall of Fame for the invention of ePTFE.

Charles Carroll, a long-term business leader in the Electronics and Fabrics Divisions, replaced Bob Gore as president in 2000. Terri Kelly, who joined Gore in 1983 as a mechanical engineer in the Fabrics Division, became president in 2005. Jason Field replaced Kelly in 2018. Bret Snyder (the grandson of the founders via their daughter Elizabeth) replaced Field in 2020. The company remains privately held.

== Allegations of anti-competitive practices ==
During the 2010s, W. L. Gore & Associates was investigated by authorities in the European Union and by the Federal Trade Commission in the United States amid allegations that the company had bullied outdoor equipment manufacturers away from competing products, thereby restricting fair trade and competition.

The US investigation sought to determine whether Gore engaged in unfair methods of competition “by contracts, exclusionary practices, or other conduct relating to waterproof or waterproof and breathable membranes or technologies and related products.”

In Europe, the outdoor brand Columbia and its brand OutDry filed a complaint that Gore violated EU anti-competition laws covering waterproof/breathable membranes in footwear and gloves.

== Use of PFAS ==
In 2022 a former employee sued the company, alleging that the company negligently used harmful PFAS chemicals in their manufacturing process, affecting employees and neighboring residents. The state of Maryland sued as well in 2024.

== Culture ==
From 1984 to 2017, W. L. Gore & Associates, Inc. earned a position on Fortune magazine's annual list of the U.S. "100 Best Companies to Work For". Its European operations have also earned similar honors.

Gore's culture evolved from the company's success with small teams during its early years. This approach to business was based on Bill Gore's experience tackling problems with "task force teams" while he was employed at the DuPont Company. They were usually multidisciplinary operated for short periods of time outside the company's formal management hierarchy.

Bill Gore presented the concept of a "lattice" organization to Gore associates in 1967. He refined this to "culture principles" in a paper entitled "The Lattice Organization – A Philosophy of Enterprise", which was distributed to Gore associates in 1976.

He proposed a flat, lattice-like organizational structure where everyone shares the same title of "associate". There are neither chains of command nor predetermined channels of communication. Leaders replace the idea of "bosses". Associates choose to follow leaders rather than have bosses assigned to them. Associate contribution reviews are based on a peer-level rating system.

He articulated four culture principles that he called freedom, fairness, commitment and waterline:

- Associates have the freedom to encourage, help, and allow other associates to grow in knowledge, skill, and scope of responsibility
- Associates should demonstrate fairness to each other and everyone with whom they come in contact
- Associates are provided the ability to make one's own commitments and are expected to keep them
- A waterline situation involves consultation with other associates before undertaking actions that could impact the reputation or profitability of the company and otherwise "sink the ship".

In the lattice organization, associates are encouraged to communicate directly with each other and are accountable to fellow members of their teams. Hands-on product innovation and prototyping are encouraged. Teams typically organize around opportunities, new product concepts, or businesses. As teams evolve, leaders frequently emerge as they gain followership. This unusual organizational structure and culture has been shown to be a significant contributor to associate satisfaction and retention.

This corporate culture was highlighted in Canadian journalist Malcolm Gladwell's 2000 book, The Tipping Point and in Brian Carney and Isaac Getz's 2009 book, Freedom, Inc.. The company was also depicted as one of several organizations denoted "Teal" organizations in Frederic Laloux's 2014 book Reinventing Organizations.

Today, the lattice organization principle is known as open allocation.

== Product portfolio ==
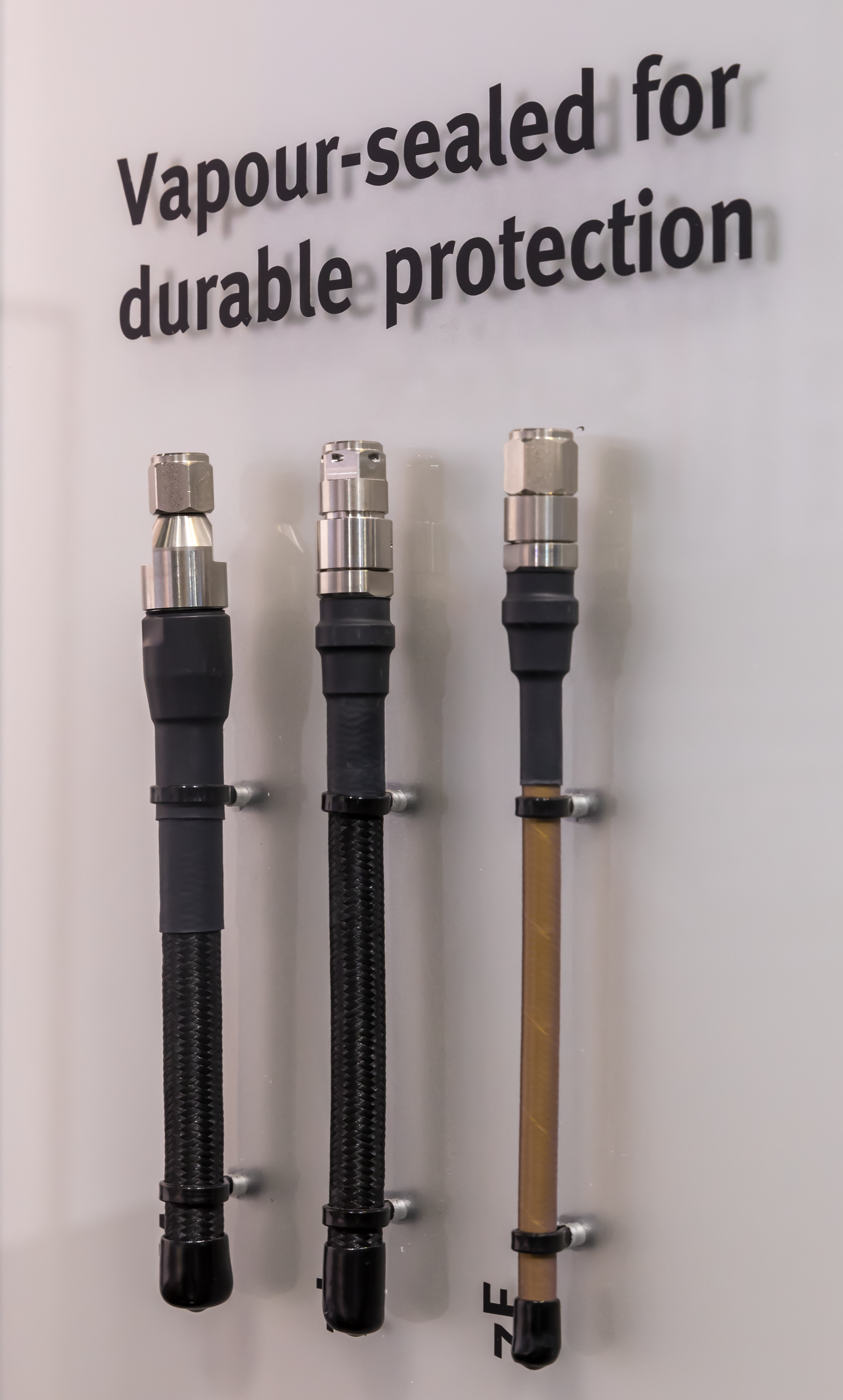
Vapour-sealed data cables for aviation applications

Gore's product line builds around a core material set using expanded PTFE and other fluoropolymers. PTFE has a combination of properties well suited to high performance applications. Some of those properties are

- Low dielectric constant (good electrical insulator)
- High thermal resistance (−200 °C to + 260 °C)
- Low coefficient of friction
- Low flammability
- UV-resistant
- Hydrophobic and oleophobic (non-wetting to water and oil)
- Chemically inert (and biocompatible)

In addition to these properties, PTFE is very soft and mechanically weak, which can be a disadvantage in certain applications. However, Gore has developed capabilities using forms of expanded PTFE with engineered microstructures that can significantly increase its strength and durability. Other Gore capabilities enable different materials to be incorporated into the ePTFE microstructure, such as catalysts and antimicrobial agents. This leads to products that can extend the inherent properties of PTFE, such as gas diffusion membranes with chemical reactivity.

Gore's product portfolio derives from a number of basic ePTFE forms that include tubes, fibers, tapes, membranes and custom shapes, such as gaskets and patches. Extreme performance testing and reliability are important steps in the development process.

=== Gore Medical ===
In January 2026, it was announced Gore had acquired Conformal Medical to expand its endovascular portfolio. As part of the acquisition, Gore obtained Conformal’s lead product, the investigational CLAAS AcuFORM system for left atrial appendage closure, with financial terms of the transaction not publicly disclosed.

Elixir Strings
- Type: Private
- Industry: Musical instruments
- Founded: 1997
- Headquarters: 201 Airport Road; Elkton, MD 21921, USA
- Products: Instrument strings
- Parent: W. L. Gore & Associates
- Website: www.elixirstrings.com

=== Music instrument strings ===
Gore sells musical instrument strings under the name Elixir Strings which utilizes fluoropolymer coating. The coating extends the strings' life and tone by reducing the accumulation of debris and blocking corrosion from elements such as skin oil.

== See also ==
- Gore-Tex, a product by Gore
