= Roy J. Plunkett =

American chemist and inventor (1910-1994)

Roy Joseph Plunkett
- Born: June 26, 1910; New Carlisle, Ohio, United States
- Died: May 12, 1994 (aged 83); Corpus Christi, Texas, United States
- Education: Manchester University (Indiana); Ohio State University
- Known for: Teflon
- Scientific career
- Fields: Organic chemistry
- Workplaces: DuPont

Roy Joseph Plunkett (June 26, 1910 – May 12, 1994) was an American chemist. He discovered polytetrafluoroethylene (PTFE), better known as Teflon, in 1938.

== Personal life and education ==
Plunkett was born in New Carlisle, Ohio and attended Newton High School in Pleasant Hill, Ohio.

In 1932, he graduated from Manchester University with a B.A. in chemistry. He received his Ph.D. in Chemistry in 1936 from Ohio State University for his work on The Mechanism of Carbohydrate Oxidation.

He married Dorothy Enola Detrick (1907 – 1984) on August 16, 1935 in Franklin, Ohio. Next, he married Lois Mary Koch (1925 – 1996) on May 14, 1965 in Arlington, Virginia.

Plunkett died of cancer on May 12, 1994, at his Texas home at the age of 83.

== Career ==
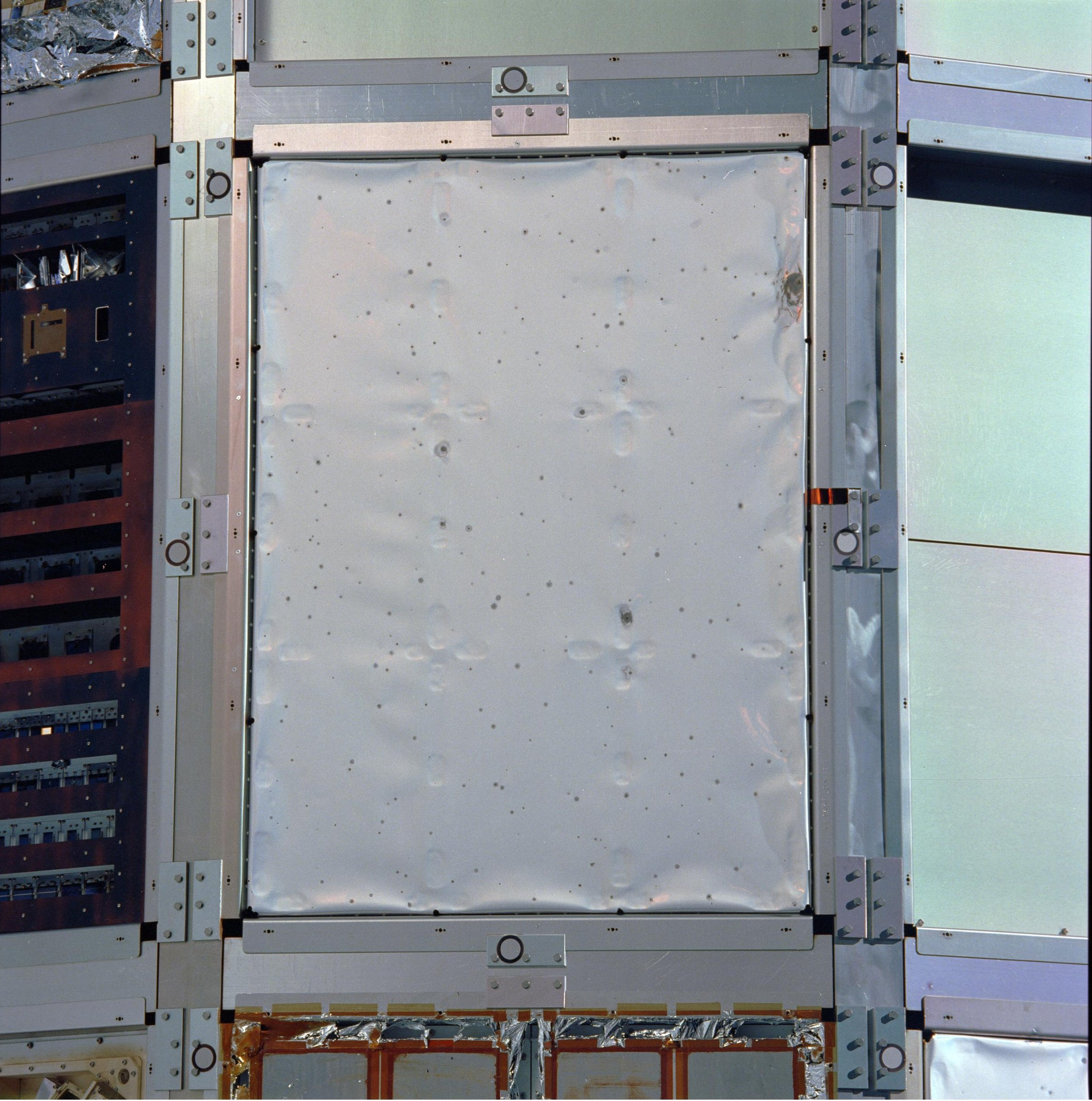
Teflon thermal cover showing impact craters, from NASA Ultra Heavy Cosmic Ray Experiment (UHCRE)

In 1936, he was hired as a research chemist by E.I. du Pont de Nemours and Company at its Jackson Laboratory in Deepwater, New Jersey.

In 1938, while attempting to make a new chlorofluorocarbon refrigerant, Plunkett's laboratory team discovered polytetrafluoroethylene (PTFE), better known as Teflon. In New York City in April 1986, Plunkett shared the story of his accidental discovery at the spring meeting of the American Chemical Society national meeting in the History of Chemistry section. His story was published in the Symposium Proceedings:

On the morning of April 6, 1938, Jack Rebok, my assistant, selected one of the TFE cylinders that we had been using the previous day and set up the apparatus ready to go. When he opened the valve—to let the TFE gas flow under its own pressure from the cylinder—nothing happened...We were in a quandary. I couldn't think of anything else to do under the circumstances, so we unscrewed the valve from the cylinder. By this time it was pretty clear that there wasn't any gas left. I carefully tipped the cylinder upside down, and out came a whitish powder down onto the lab bench. We scraped around some with the wire inside the cylinder...to get some more of the powder. What I got out that way certainly didn't add up, so I knew there must be more, inside. Finally...we decided to cut open the cylinder. When we did, we found more of the powder packed onto the bottom and lower sides of the cylinder.

The tetrafluoroethylene in the container had polymerized into polytetrafluoroethylene, a waxy solid with that was found to have had properties such as resistance to corrosion, low surface friction, and high heat resistance.

Later in his career, Plunkett was the chief chemist involved in the production of tetraethyllead, an antiknock agent that made gasoline "leaded," later discontinued over concerns about the toxic effects of lead. After that, he directed the production of Freon, DuPont's brand name for chlorofluorocarbon refrigerant. He retired in 1975.

== Awards ==
In 1951, Plunkett received the John Scott Medal from the city of Philadelphia for an invention promoting the "comfort, welfare, and happiness of humankind". Attendees were given a Teflon-coated muffin tin to take home. Other awards and honors followed. Plunkett was inducted into the Plastics Hall of Fame in 1973 and the National Inventors Hall of Fame in 1985.
