= Bill Gore =

American businessman and entrepreneur

Wilbert Lee Gore
- Born: January 25, 1912; Meridian, Idaho, US
- Died: July 26, 1986 (aged 74); Lander, Wyoming, US
- Education: University of Utah
- Known for: Gore-Tex
- Awards: Plastics Hall of Fame
- Scientific career
- Fields: Chemical engineering
- Workplaces: W. L. Gore and Associates; DuPont

Wilbert Lee "Bill" Gore (January 25, 1912 – July 26, 1986) was an American engineer and scientist, inventor and businessman who co-founded W. L. Gore and Associates with his wife, Genevieve (Vieve).

Trained as a chemical engineer and chemist, his technical interests included polymer engineering, applications of statistical methods to experimentation, and methods of operations research. He held patents in the fields of plastics, fluorocarbons, and electronics. He was also an active outdoorsman.

== Biographical information ==
Born in Meridian, Idaho in 1912, Bill Gore held degrees in chemical engineering (B.S., 1933) and physical chemistry (M.S., 1935) from the University of Utah. His early career included employment at American Smelting and Refining Company, Remington Arms, and the DuPont Company.

In 1957, Gore left a career with DuPont to pursue an idea of his own for making electronic ribbon cable for use in computers that was insulated with polytetrafluoroethylene (PTFE). Bill and Vieve started their company, W. L. Gore & Associates, in the basement of their Newark, Delaware home in 1958. One of the key processes involved was suggested by their son, Bob Gore, then a sophomore in college. By 1960, increasing orders for their MULTI-TET ribbon cable, in particular a contract from the Denver Water Company, resulted in the construction of a separate manufacturing facility.

Under Bill Gore's leadership, the company grew from a modest business into an international corporation known best for its waterproof, breathable Gore-Tex fabrics. Today, the company has a broad portfolio of products based on PTFE that include cables for electronic signal transmission, diverse industrial applications, medical implants and laminated fabrics. The company was known for its innovative "lattice" management structure, which Bill Gore is widely credited for developing.

Bill Gore served as president of W. L. Gore & Associates until he stepped down in 1976, in favor of his son, Bob. Bill maintained his position as chairman of the board until his death. He died of a heart attack at the age of 74 in July 1986 while on a backpacking trip in Wyoming's Wind River Range.

== Awards and honors ==
Bill Gore was honored with numerous business, education, and community awards, including a University of Delaware Medal of Distinction (1983) and an honorary doctorate in humanities (1971) from Westminster College. In 1985, Bill Gore received the Prince Philip Award for Polymers in the Service of Mankind, which honored Gore's Medical Products Division. The award is given in recognition of polymers that have provided a significant service for mankind. He was inducted posthumously into the Plastics Hall of Fame in 1990. In 2012, he was named one of The 50 Most Influential Delawareans of the Past 50 Years.

== Personal life ==
Bill and his wife had five children, including Robert W. Gore.
