= Gore-Tex =

Trademark for a waterproof, breathable fabric

- Gore-Tex logo
- Type: Fabric
- Material: expanded PTFE
- Production process: Mechanized
- Introduced: 1969
- Manufacturer: W. L. Gore & Associates

Gore-Tex is W. L. Gore & Associates's trade name for waterproof, breathable fabric membrane. It was invented in 1969. Gore-Tex blocks liquid water while allowing water vapor to pass through and is designed to be a lightweight, waterproof fabric for all-weather use. It is composed of expanded PTFE (ePTFE), a stretched out form of the PFAS compound polytetrafluoroethylene (PTFE).

== History ==
External videos
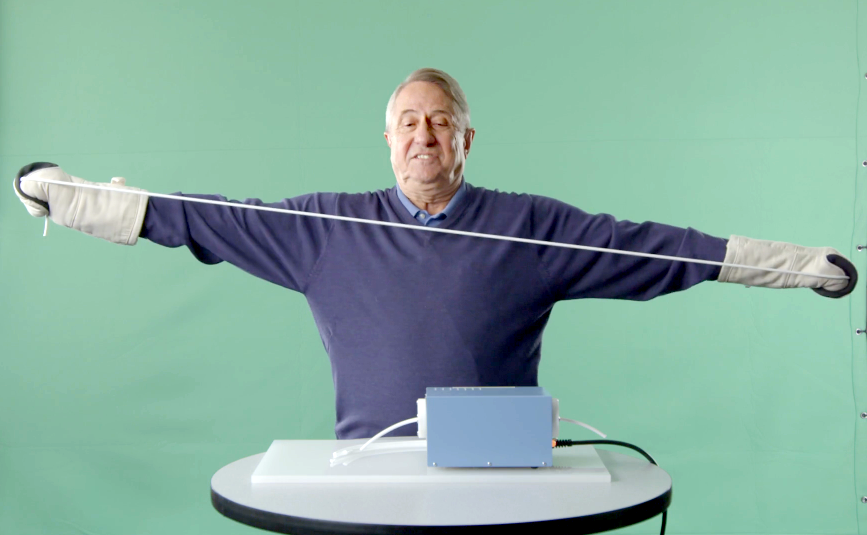
- "I decided to give one of these rods a huge stretch, fast, a jerk... and it stretched 1000%", Scientists You Must Know: Bob Gore, Science History Institute

Gore-Tex was co-invented by Wilbert L. Gore and Gore's son, Robert W. Gore. In 1969, Robert (Bob) Gore stretched heated rods of polytetrafluoroethylene (PTFE) and created expanded polytetrafluoroethylene (ePTFE). His discovery of the right conditions for stretching PTFE was a happy accident, born partly of frustration. Instead of slowly stretching the heated material, he applied a sudden, accelerating yank. The solid PTFE unexpectedly stretched about 800%, forming a microporous structure that was about 70% air. It was introduced to the public under the trademark Gore-Tex. In 1976, the outdoor brand, Marmot, became one of the first adopters of Gore-Tex in their products, starting with a waterproof sleeping bag.

Gore promptly applied for and obtained the following patents:

- U.S. patent 3,953,566, valid from 1976-04-27 to 1993-04-27 for a porous form of polytetrafluoroethylene with a micro-structure characterized by nodes interconnected by fibrils
- U.S. patent 4,187,390, valid from 1980-02-05 to 1997-02-05
- U.S. patent 4,194,041, valid from 1980-03-18 to 1998-06-29 for a "waterproof laminate", together with Samuel Allen

Another form of stretched PTFE tape was produced prior to Gore-Tex in 1966, by John W. Cropper of New Zealand. Cropper had developed and constructed a machine for this use. However, Cropper chose to keep the process of creating expanded PTFE as a closely held trade secret and as such, it had remained unpublished.

=== Gore patent held valid in 1983 ===
In the 1970s Garlock, Inc. allegedly infringed Gore's patents by using Cropper's machine and was sued by Gore in the Federal District Court of Ohio. The District Court held Gore's product and process patents to be invalid after a "bitterly contested case" that "involved over two years of discovery, five weeks of trial, the testimony of 35 witnesses (19 live, 16 by deposition), and over 300 exhibits" (quoting the Federal Circuit). On appeal, however, the Federal Circuit disagreed in the famous case of Gore v. Garlock, reversing the lower court's decision on the ground, as well as others, that Cropper forfeited any superior claim to the invention by virtue of having concealed the process for making ePTFE from the public. As a public patent had not been filed, the new form of the material could not be legally recognised. Gore was thereby established as the legal inventor of ePTFE.

=== Gore patent held invalid in 1990 ===
Following the Gore v. Garlock decision, Gore sued C. R. Bard for allegedly infringing its patent by making ePTFE vascular grafts. Bard promptly settled and agreed to exit the market. Gore next sued IMPRA, Inc., a smaller maker of ePTFE vascular grafts, in the federal district court in Arizona. IMPRA had a competing patent application for the ePTFE vascular graft. In a nearly decade-long patent/antitrust battle (1984–1993), IMPRA proved that Gore-Tex was identical to prior art disclosed in a Japanese process patent by duplicating the prior art process and through statistical analysis, and also proved that Gore had withheld the best mode for using its patent, and the main claim of Gore's product patent was declared invalid in 1990.

In 1996, IMPRA was purchased by Bard and Bard was thereby able to reenter the market. In 2002, IMPRA vascular graft patent U.S. patent 6,436,135 was issued, and Bard sued Gore for infringing it.

In 2006, Robert W. Gore was inducted into the U.S. National Inventors Hall of Fame for his invention.

In 2015, Gore was ordered by the Federal Circuit Court of Appeals to pay Bard $1 billion in damages. The U.S. Supreme Court declined to review the Federal Circuit's decision.

Gore-Tex is used in products manufactured by many different companies.

Gore's patents on ePTFE based fabric expired in 1997 and ePTFE membrane waterproof fabrics have become available from other brands.

== Structure ==
ePTFE has a porous microstructure composed of long, narrow fibrils that intersect at nodes. Increasing the processing temperature or increasing the strain rate leads to more homogenous expansion with more spherically symmetric pores and more intersections between fibrils. The formation of ePTFE is enabled by the unwinding of PTFE molecules to create large pores within the structure. This favors highly ordered, crystalline PTFE that allows the molecules to disentangle more easily and uniformly when stretched. The porosity is largely determined by the stretching temperature and rate. Changing the stretching rate from 4.8 m/min to 8m/min can increase the porosity from 60.4% to 70.8%.

== Properties ==
Due to the high work hardening rate of PTFE, ePTFE is significantly stronger than the unstretched material. On a microscopic level, this work hardening corresponds to the increasing crystallinity of PTFE as the fibrils untangle and orient upon the application of an external stress. ePTFE has a strikingly high ultimate tensile strength (50–800 MPa) relative to its full-density counterpart (20–30 MPa) as a result of its high crystallinity. This behavior also yields a negative Poisson's ratio due to the expansion of ePTFE along all directions, contrasting the more expected reduction in the directions perpendicular to the stress in cases with volume conservation.

ePTFE has tunable porosity based on the processing conditions and can be made permeable to certain vapors and gases. However, it is impermeable to most liquids, including water, a property that is exploited in certain applications such as raincoats. These additional properties in combination with the inherent properties of PTFE-based materials more generally (chemical inertness, thermal stability) make ePTFE a versatile material for a range of applications.

== Processing ==
The most common process used to produce large sheets of ePTFE at scale is a tape stretching process through the following steps:

1. A lubricating agent (often an oil) is added to fine PTFE powder until a paste is formed.
2. The paste is extruded into a sheet that is calendered to obtain a specific, uniform thickness.
3. The PTFE sheet passes through an oven set to an elevated temperature (often around 300C) while simultaneously undergoing an applied stress that dramatically stretches the material. While heating during this step is not necessary for expansion, it improves the uniformity of expansion.
4. The ePTFE is sintered to increase its strength. This typically involves heating it to a temperature just above the melting temperature of unexpanded PTFE (340C) so that molecules can diffuse across the boundaries between grains in the material. This reduces the gaps in the ePTFE that might have formed during the stretching step.

Factors such as strain rate, oven temperature, sintering time, and sintering duration can affect the specific properties of the resulting ePTFE sheet which can be tailored to match particular applications.

== Environmental and health concerns ==
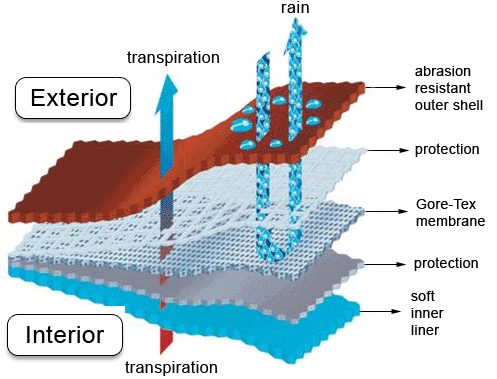
Schematic of a composite Gore-Tex fabric for outdoor clothing

PTFE is a fluoropolymer made using an emulsion polymerization process that utilizes the fluorosurfactant PFOA, a persistent environmental contaminant. The International Agency for Research on Cancer has classified PFOA as carcinogenic to humans.

Gore pledged in 2017 to eliminate PFCs such as PFOA by 2023, although the core technology will continue to be based on PTFE, which is a PFAS compound. Many Gore-Tex products have a durable water repellent coating and the version that do not contain PFCs of environmental concerns are marketed as "Gore PFC_{EC} Free DWR". Unlike the "Gore DWR", it lacks any form of oil repellency.

From 2024 onwards, the company is replacing ePTFE membrane with an expanded polyethylene (ePE) membrane in consumer fabrics. The new material, while intended to perform comparably to the existing ePTFE material, will cost more, and require more frequent washing.

=== Pollution lawsuit ===
In 2023, two lawsuits have been filed against Gore on the matter of PFAS related water pollution around its Cecil County, Maryland manufacturing plant and the Maryland Department of the Environment has ordered an investigation and residents in the monitored area have been offered bottled water. One of the lawsuits alleges that the company knew about the dangers of PFOA/PFAS since the 1990s.

A lawsuit was filed by the state of Maryland in December 2024, focusing on liability for decades of pollution of forever chemicals left by thirteen Gore-Tex manufacturing facilities in Cecil County.

== Applications ==
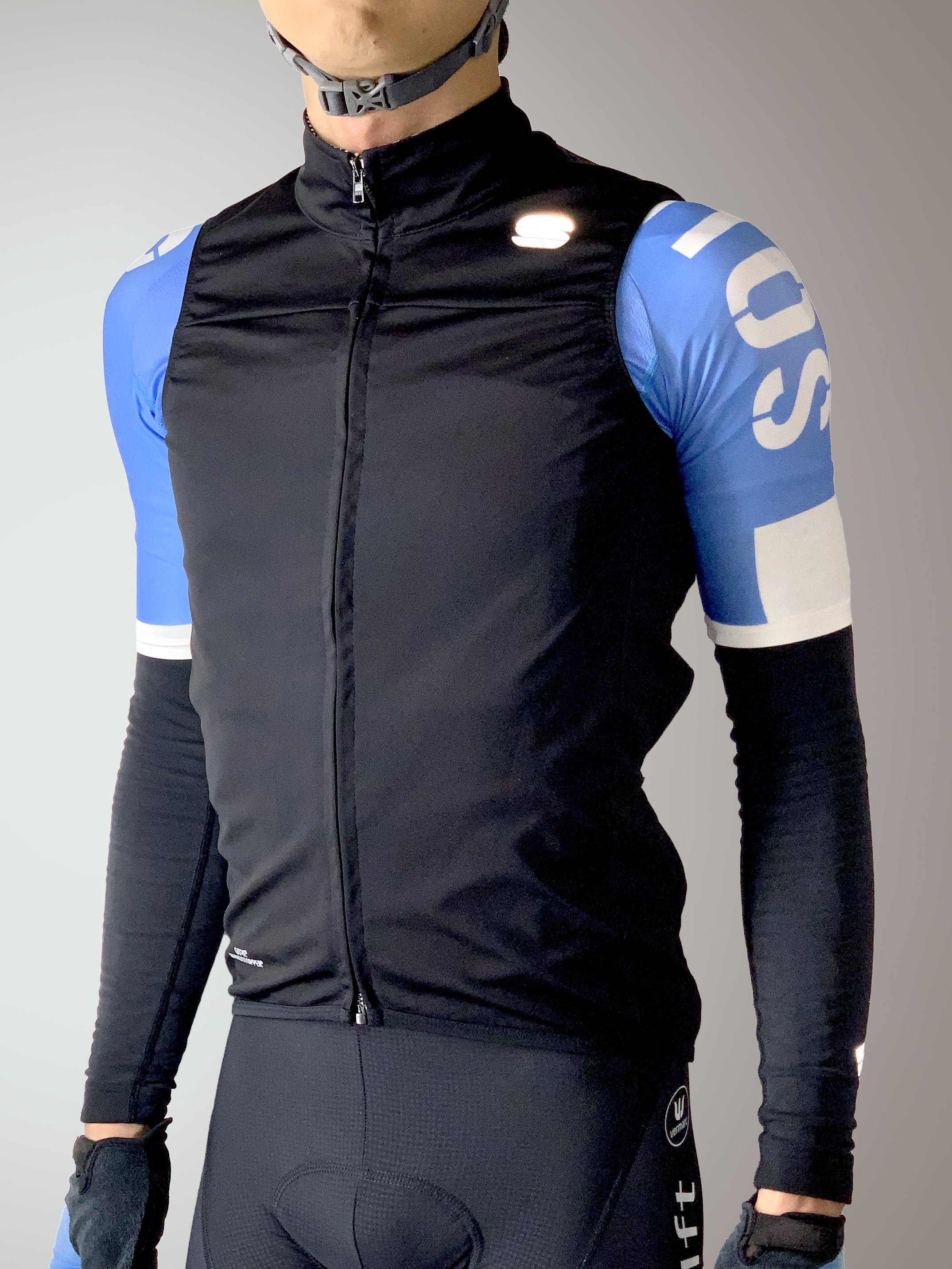
Gore-Tex Windstopper water-repellent cycling gilet for road cycling.

Gore-Tex materials are typically based on thermo-mechanically expanded PTFE and other fluoropolymer products. They are used in a wide variety of applications such as high-performance fabrics, medical implants, filter media, insulation for wires and cables, gaskets, and sealants. However, Gore-Tex fabric is best known for its use in protective, yet breathable, rainwear.

=== Use in rainwear ===
Before the introduction of Gore-Tex, the simplest sort of rainwear would consist of a two-layer sandwich, where the outer layer would typically be woven nylon or polyester to provide strength. The inner one would be polyurethane (abbreviated: PU) to provide water resistance, at the cost of breathability.

Early Gore-Tex fabric replaced the inner layer of non-breathable PU with a thin, porous fluoropolymer membrane (Teflon) coating that is bonded to a fabric. This membrane had about 9 billion pores per square inch (around 1.4 billion pores per square centimeter). Each pore is approximately 1/20,000 the size of a water droplet, making it impenetrable to liquid water while still allowing the more volatile water vapor molecules to pass through.

The outer layer of Gore-Tex fabric is coated on the outside with a Durable Water Repellent (DWR) treatment. The DWR prevents the main outer layer from becoming wet, which would reduce the breathability of the whole fabric. However, the DWR is not responsible for the jacket being waterproof. Without the DWR, the Gore-Tex layer would become soaked, thus preventing any breathability, and the wearer's sweat being produced on the inside would fail to evaporate, leading to dampness there. This might give the appearance that the fabric is leaking when it is not. Wear and cleaning will reduce the performance of Gore-Tex fabric by wearing away this Durable Water Repellent (DWR) treatment. The DWR can be reinvigorated by tumble drying the garment or ironing on a low setting.

Gore requires that all garments made from their material have taping over the seams, to eliminate leaks. Gore's sister product, Windstopper, is similar to Gore-Tex in being windproof and breathable, and it can stretch, but it is not waterproof. The Gore naming system does not imply any specific technology or material but instead implies a specific set of performance characteristics.

=== Use in other clothing ===
Expanded polytetrafluoroethylene is used in clothing due to its breathability and water protection capabilities. Besides use in rainwear ePTFE can now be found in space suits.

=== Other uses ===
Gore-Tex is also used internally in medical applications, because it is nearly inert inside the body. Specifically, expanded polytetrafluoroethylene (E-PTFE) can take the form of a fabric-like mesh. Implementing and applying the mesh form in the medical field is a promising type of technological material feature. In addition, the porosity of Gore-Tex permits the body's own tissue to grow through the material, integrating grafted material into the circulation system. Gore-Tex is used in a wide variety of medical applications, including sutures, vascular grafts, heart patches, and synthetic knee ligaments, which have saved thousands of lives. In the form of expanded polytetrafluoroethylene (E-PTFE), Gore-Tex has been shown to be a reliable synthetic, medical material in treating patients with nasal dorsal interruptions. In more recent observations, expanded polytetrafluoroethylene (E-PTFE) has recently been used as membrane implants for glaucoma surgery.

Gore-Tex has been used for many years in the conservation of illuminated manuscripts.

Explosive sensors have been printed on Gore-Tex clothing leading to the sensitive voltametric detection of nitroaromatic compounds.

The "Gore-Tex" brand name was formerly used for industrial and medical products.

Gore-Tex has been used since the 1980s to make bagpipe bags as an alternative to bags made of animal hides as it was able to hold air while allowing moisture to escape, and did not degrade with exposure to water.

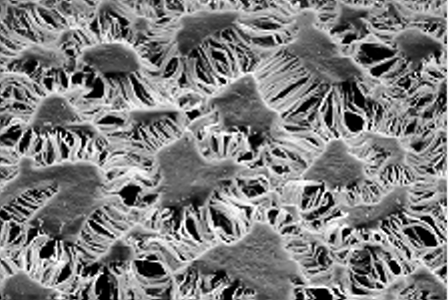
Gore-Tex membrane under an electron microscope

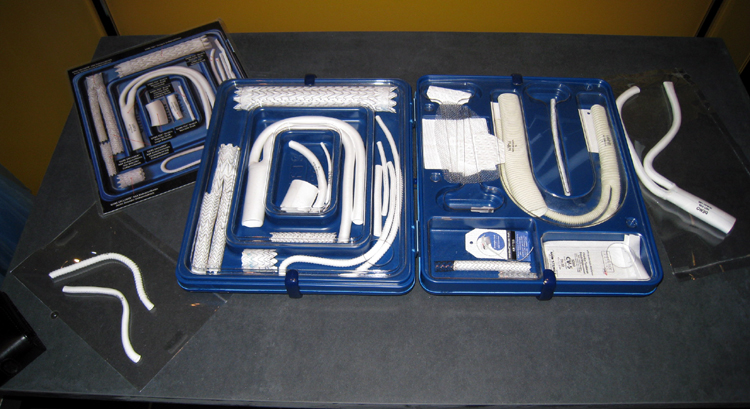
Gore-Tex Medical Devices Sample Kit, Science History Institute

== See also ==
- Extended Cold Weather Clothing System
