= Wedding of David Gest and Liza Minnelli =

2002 celebrity wedding

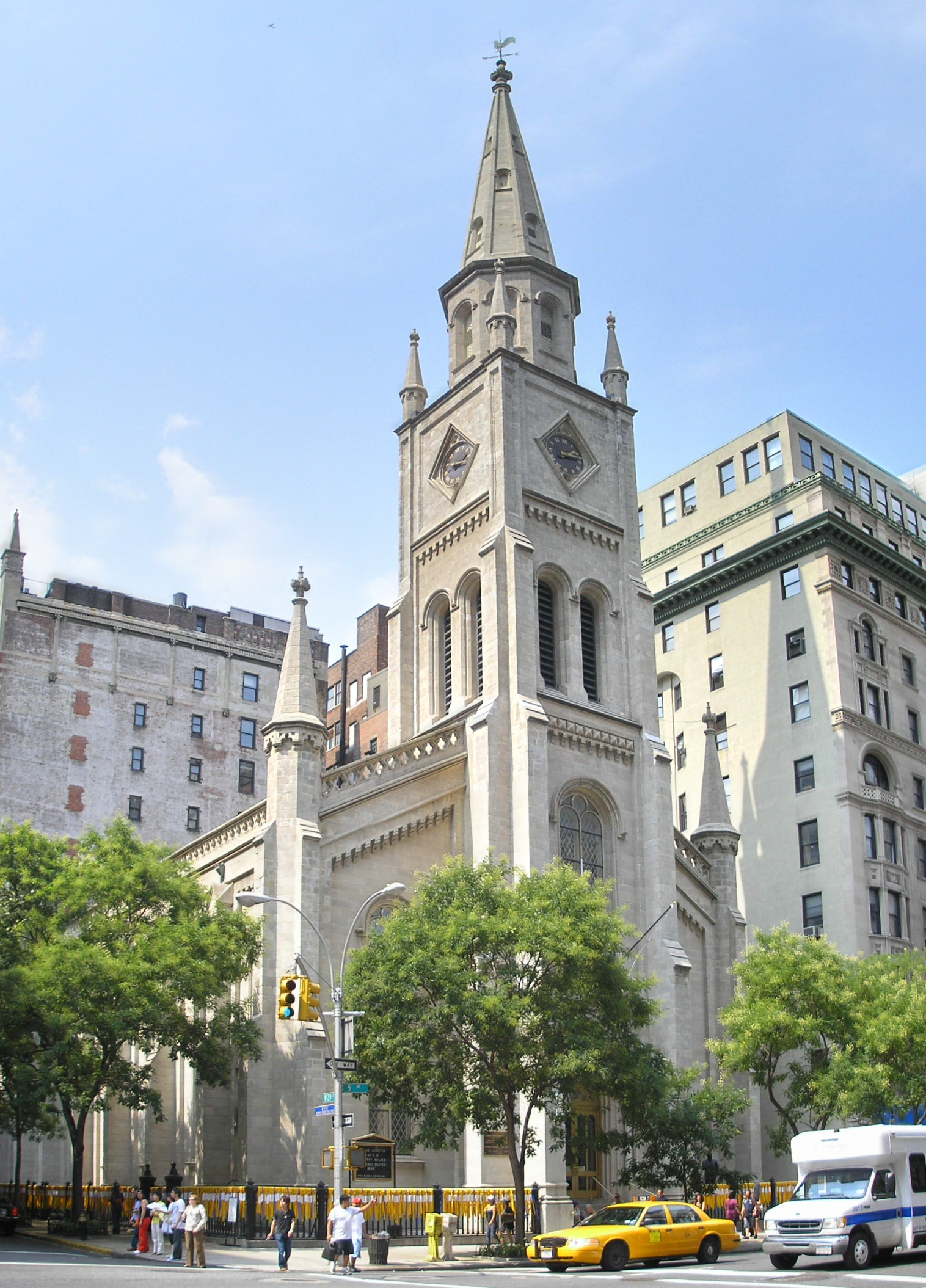
The Marble Collegiate Church in 2007

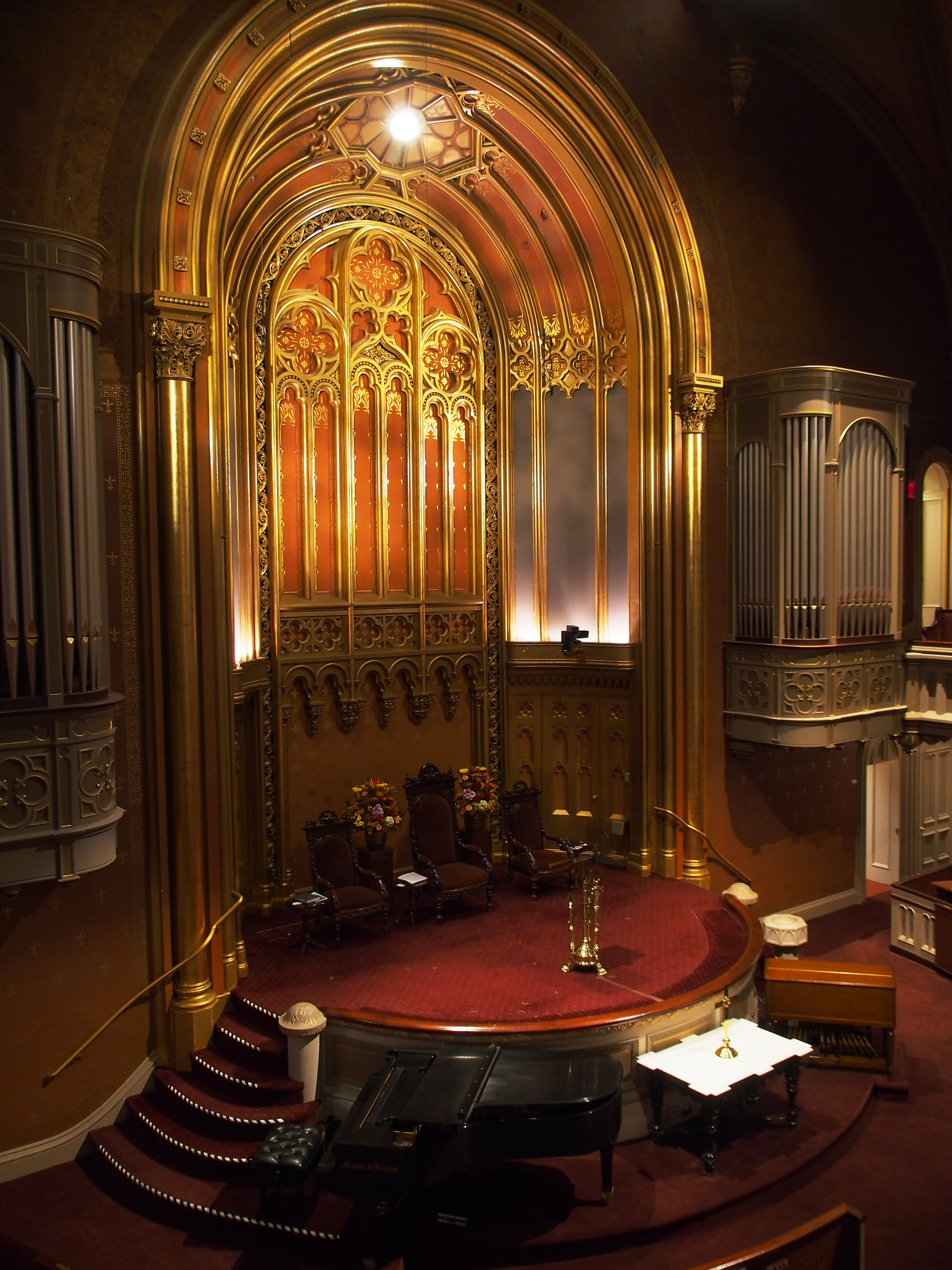
The altar of the Marble Collegiate Church

The wedding of the producer David Gest and the actress, singer and dancer Liza Minnelli took place on 16 March 2002 at the Marble Collegiate Church in New York City. The reception was held at the Regent Wall Street Hotel. The couple separated in 2003 and divorced in 2007.

== Background ==
The wedding was Gest's first and Minnelli's fourth. The rights to the wedding were sold to the British celebrity magazine OK! for an estimated £500,000. The London Evening Standard reported that the couple may have been encouraged to invite more British guests by the magazine and that their payment may have been dependent on the presence of such guests. It was considered the first 'event wedding' of the 21st-century. The New York Daily News lamented that though it was 'hyped as the wedding of the century' many of the guests were 'relics of the last century'. People magazine described the guest list as "a nostalgic cross section of Garland’s contemporaries, Gest's music-industry pals, and the usual Big Apple party hoppers". People magazine wrote that the wedding made other lavish celebrity weddings "seem downright dull by comparison" due to its "gaudy spectacle" and "unlikely love story" of the couple. Gest's friend, the actress Ann Rutherford said that he had originally wanted to get married at St. Patrick's Cathedral but she had told him that "you can't convert from Judaism in only six months for the sake of a glamorous photo shoot". In The New York Observer, Rex Reed wrote "O.K., so the groom ran the show and the bride didn't know half of the guests, not to mention most of her own bridesmaids. O.K., so "The Event of the Year" was maybe more like "The Event of the Year, So Far." (It's only March.)".

Minnelli's makeup was done by Kevyn Aucoin. The bridal shower was held at the Manhattan home of songwriter Denise Rich. The couple's wedding list was registered at Bergdorf Goodman, Lalique and Tiffany & Co. and attracted publicity due to its perceived extravagance.

Many of the guests started arriving for the wedding two hours early, with traffic being an issue due to the wet weather and the annual New York City St. Patrick's Day Parade occurring on the same day. The wedding began at 6pm with "Belle of the Ball" by Leroy Anderson played on the organ as Gest's best man Michael Jackson and the bridesmaids arrived.

== Ceremony ==
Minnelli's wedding dress was made by Bob Mackie. It was made from ivory satin with "princess and marquise" cut crystals and a bodice with pearl beading. Columnist Rex Reed described Minnelli as resembling a 'goth' Gibson Girl. Mackie's biographer, Frank Vlastnik, jokingly wrote that the designs for the dress were "as closely guarded" as the Normandy landings of the Second World War and that Mackie was the 'Crown Prince of the Imperial Monarchy of the Island of Bling'. Mackie recalled the planning for the wedding as "nuts" and that it was "absolute pandemonium" at the church. The ceremony was nondenominational as Gest was half Jewish and Christian and Minnelli was a Roman Catholic. The bridal party had 36 people. Minnelli's two maids of honor were Elizabeth Taylor and Marisa Berenson. Gest's best men were Michael and Tito Jackson. They were accompanied by 13 bridesmaids, 13 groomsmen, two ushers, two flower girls and two flower boys. The groomsmen included the Jackson 5 of Marlon Jackson, Michael Jackson, Randy Jackson and Tito Jackson. The processional hymn was "Unforgettable" sung by Natalie Cole. It had originally been planned for Whitney Houston to perform "The Greatest Love of All" but she cancelled the day before the ceremony. Minnelli had 13 bridesmaids, who dressed in black. Her bridesmaids included Cindy Adams, Mya, Gina Lollobrigida, Petula Clark, Cynthia McFadden, and Mia Farrow. Jackson had difficulty opening the box containing the wedding rings and was helped by Taylor.

The ceremony concluded with Shirley Caesar singing "Amazing Grace" and couple exited down the aisle to the song "Great Day" before departing by limousine to the reception at the Regent Wall Street Hotel.

Minnelli's half brother, Joey Luft and her half sister Christiana Nina Minnelli attended. Her half sister Lorna Luft was absent as she was performing in Australia. The wedding toast was given by Michael Jackson. He left to join Elizabeth Taylor who was suffering from back pain.

=== The kiss at the altar ===
Gest's kissing of Minnelli at the altar was described by Time magazine as "the most talked-about moment of the night" as it was "dramatic (and by most accounts, quite discomfiting)" and likened it to a shark attacking "his bedazzled prey". People magazine wrote that the guests "couldn't stop talking about it". One of the wedding guests, businessman Donald Trump, said that he had "been to many weddings, and I have never seen a kiss like that before". Joy Behar said that Gest "sucked her lips right out of her face!".

In her memoir Kids, Wait Till You Hear This!, Minnelli described the kiss as Gest "[plung]ing his tongue deep into my mouth. Like a shark mangling a piece of meat. Ugh! I felt degraded. In manhandling me, Gest put on a limp display of masculinity and testosterone. He never kissed me like that in our private life. Nor would I let him! This was a cheap photo op and nothing more".

== Guests ==
Guests included the actors Lauren Bacall, Ann Blyth, Claudia Cardinale, Joan Collins, Arlene Dahl, Anita Dobson, Kirk Douglas, Mia Farrow, Tony Franciosa, David Hasselhoff, June Haver, Geoffrey Holder, Celeste Holm, Anthony Hopkins, Sally Ann Howes, Marsha Hunt, Anne Jeffreys, Star Jones, Sally Kirkland, Janet Leigh, Martine McCutcheon, Dina Merrill, Hayley Mills, Franco Nero, Phyllis Newman, Margaret O'Brien, Natasha Richardson, Ann Rutherford, Jill St. John, Gale Storm, Robert Wagner and Jane Withers.

Cy Coleman, Phyllis Diller, Ahmet Ertegun, Adolph Green, Mathilde Krim, Andrew Lloyd-Webber, Graham Norton, Rosie O'Donnell, Paul Reubens, Diana Ross, Diane Sawyer, Gene Simmons, Martha Stewart, Donald Trump, Luther Vandross, Barbara Walters and Dionne Warwick were also present.

Guests invited who did not arrive included Mikhail Baryshnikov, Cyd Charisse,Michael Douglas, Clint Eastwood, Hubert de Givenchy, Whoopi Goldberg, Billy Joel, Elton John, Sophia Loren, Shirley MacLaine, Ann Miller, Liam Neeson, Robert De Niro, Yoko Ono, Barbra Streisand, Barbara Walters and Esther Williams. Politicians invited who did not attend included the former American presidents Gerald Ford and Bill Clinton, the New York Senator Hillary Clinton, the Mayor of New York Michael Bloomberg and the former mayor Rudy Giuliani.

People magazine described the guest list as "a nostalgic cross section of Garland’s contemporaries, Gest's music-industry pals, and the usual Big Apple party hoppers".

== Reception ==
The reception was held at the Regent Wall Street Hotel. The 12,000 sq ft ballroom of the hotel had 120 tables for 10 people decorated in red with "massive centerpieces" of red roses and anemones. The lighting for the reception was designed by Bentley Meeker. The wedding cake was 7 ft tall with 14 tiers and was topped with models of Gest and Minnelli. It was made by Sylvia Weinstock. The estimated cost of the food, drink and accommodation was £340,000. Porcini-crusted beef and roasted halibut was served to guests at the reception. Upon departing guests were given heart shaped boxes of chocolates and cookies made by See's Candies with a portrait of Gest and Minnelli. The last guest left at 2am. 1,200 breakfasts to be served at 4am were cancelled.

Minnelli wore a floor length white fur coat at the reception with a red minidress topped with pink and red ostrich feathers. In 2012 Time magazine listed the wedding as one of the '10 Most Lavish Weddings Ever'.

Entertainment at the reception was provided by 45 musical acts. Singers included Tony Bennett, Vicki Carr, Deborah Cox, Michael Feinstein, Marilyn McCoo, Michael McDonald, Donny Osmond, Snazzy, Stevie Wonder, Little Anthony and the Imperials. Andy Williams performed "Our Love Is Here To Stay" and Mya performed "Lady Marmalade". Other acts included The Doobie Brothers and The Pointer Sisters. Performers were accompanied by a 60-piece orchestra. Al Green performed "Me and Mrs. Jones" and Gloria Gaynor sang "I Will Survive". Ray Conniff conducted a choir for a performance of "Lara's Theme" from Dr Zhivago, "while globe lights filled the ballroom in a Russian storm of swirling snowflakes". Sacha Distel and Dionne Warwick performed "La Belle Vie". Brian May played guitar as guests sang "We Are the Champions". Topol sang "If I Were a Rich Man" and Ann Blyth sang "Baubles, Bangles and Beads". The anticipated reunion of the Pointer Sisters did not occur.

== Aftermath ==
In her memoir Kids, Wait Till You Hear This!, Minnelli described the wedding as both the "event of the season" and "highway robbery" due to the large amounts that Gest charged to her American Express credit card. The couple planned to adopt four children. Minnelli and Gest had their honeymoon in London, where they were victims of an attempted robbery as they were driven in a limousine through Holland Park. The couple separated in 2003 and divorced in 2007 after an acrimonious separation.
