= 55 Wall Street =

Building in Manhattan, New York

- National City Bank Building
- U.S. National Register of Historic Places
- U.S. National Historic Landmark
- U.S. Historic district – Contributing property
- New York State Register of Historic Places
- New York City Landmark
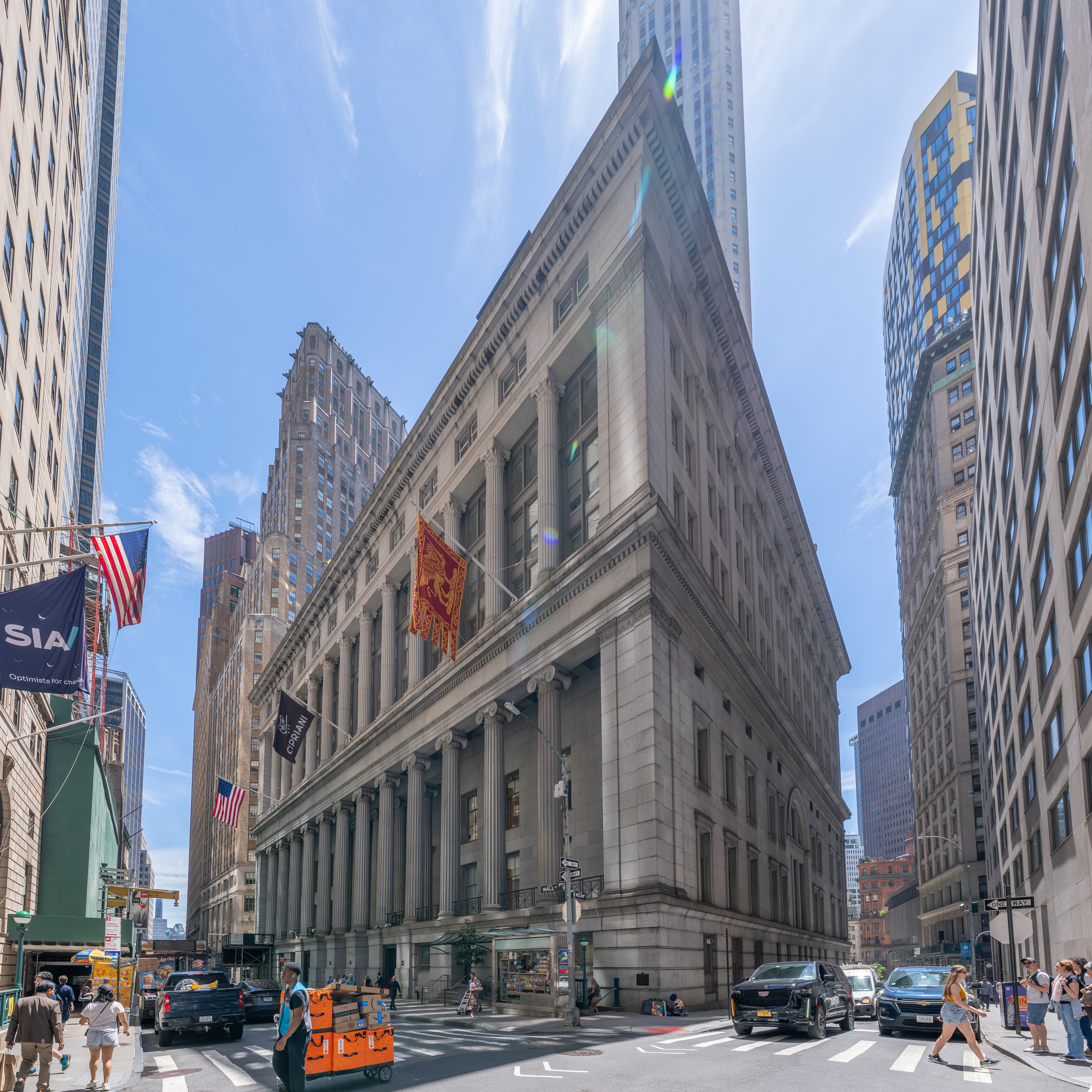
- 55 Wall Street in 2026
- Interactive map of National City Bank Building
- Location: Manhattan, New York
- Coordinates: 40°42′22″N 74°00′34″W
- Built: 1836–1841 or 1842 (first three stories and original fourth story) (Note: Some sources give a completion date of 1841, while others cite a date of 1842.); 1907 to 1910 (top five stories)
- Architects: Isaiah Rogers (original); McKim, Mead & White (additions)
- Architectural style: Greek Revival (original); Roman (additions)
- Part of: Wall Street Historic District (ID07000063)
- NRHP reference No.: 72000872 (NRHP listing), 78001875 (NHL listing)
- NYSRHP No.: 06101.000012
- NYCL No.: 0040, 1979

Significant dates
- Added to NRHP: August 18, 1972
- Designated NHL: June 2, 1978
- Designated CP: February 20, 2007
- Designated NYSRHP: June 23, 1980
- Designated NYCL: December 21, 1965 (exterior); January 12, 1999 (interior)

55 Wall Street, formerly the National City Bank Building, is an eight-story building on Wall Street between William and Hanover streets in the Financial District of Lower Manhattan in New York City, New York, United States. The lowest three stories were completed in either 1841 or 1842 as the four-story Merchants' Exchange and designed by Isaiah Rogers in the Greek Revival style. Between 1907 and 1910, McKim, Mead & White removed the original fourth story and added five floors to create the present building. Since 2006, the banking room has functioned as an event venue called the Cipriani Wall Street, while the upper stories have been a condominium development known as the Cipriani Club Residences.

55 Wall Street's granite facade includes two stacked colonnades facing Wall Street, each with twelve columns. Inside is a cruciform banking hall with a 60-foot (18 m) vaulted ceiling, Corinthian columns, marble floors and walls, and an entablature around the interior. The banking hall was among the largest in the United States when it was completed. The offices of Citibank's predecessor National City Bank were in the corners of the banking hall, while the fourth through eighth floors were used as office space. The facade and part of the interior are New York City designated landmarks, and the building is listed on both the New York State Register of Historic Places and the National Register of Historic Places (NRHP) as a National Historic Landmark. It is also a contributing property to the Wall Street Historic District, listed on the NRHP.

The Merchants' Exchange building replaced a structure that had burned down in the Great New York City Fire of 1835. 55 Wall Street subsequently hosted the New York Stock Exchange, then the United States Custom House until a new Custom House building was developed on Bowling Green in the 1900s. After 55 Wall Street was expanded, it served as the headquarters of National City Bank from 1908 to 1961; Citibank continued to own the building until 1992. The upper stories operated as a hotel from 2000 to 2003. Cipriani S.A. and Steve Witkoff began converting the upper stories to condominiums in 2004, while Cipriani operated the banking room as an event venue.

== Site ==
55 Wall Street occupies a full block bounded by Wall Street to the north, Hanover Street to the east, Exchange Place to the south, and William Street to the west. Though the building occupies an entire city block, each side is a different length due to the irregular street grid in the area. The dimensions of the building are 191 feet (58 m) on Wall Street, 141 feet (43 m) on Hanover Street, 197 feet (60 m) on Exchange Place, and 177 feet (54 m) on William Street. (Note: Smith 1908, p. 129 gives slightly different dimensions of 197 feet (60 m) on both Exchange Place and Wall Street, 140 feet (43 m) on Hanover Street, and 171 feet (52 m) on William Street.)

The building is near 48 Wall Street and 60 Wall Street to the north, the Wall and Hanover Building to the east, 20 Exchange Place to the south, and 15 Broad Street to the west. Immediately outside the building's northwestern corner is an entrance to the Wall Street station on the New York City Subway's Broadway–Seventh Avenue Line (served by the 2 and 3 trains).

== Architecture ==
55 Wall Street is eight stories tall and has a basement; it is composed of the original three-story building and a five-story addition. The original building was designed by Boston architect Isaiah Rogers in the Greek Revival style and built between 1836 and either 1841 or 1842. As constructed, the building was topped by a brick dome rising 124 feet (38 m) above ground level. The dome was 80 feet (24 m) wide and rose 90 feet (27 m) above the main exchange floor. It was supported by "eight pilasters of fine variegated Italian marble". The original domed structure was the most prominent part of the Lower Manhattan skyline in the early 19th century.

Charles Follen McKim of McKim, Mead & White, along with William S. Richardson, was hired to enlarge the building between 1907 and 1910. The firm had previously designed commercial buildings, including numerous banks. Their work included removing the dome and top story; adding five floors and a second colonnade; and redesigning the exchange floor into a main banking floor. A net total of four stories were added. The first floor was also lowered slightly to resemble a basement and the actual basement was relabeled as a sub-basement.

=== Facade ===
The facade is composed of ashlar granite masonry. The northern and eastern facades are composed of thirteen vertical architectural bays, while the William Street side has ten bays and the Exchange Place side has eight bays. Most of the bays contain one window on each floor. There is an entrance for office tenants at 53 Wall Street, in the western portion of the building. The central entrance at 55 Wall Street connects with the former banking room.

A cornice and various entablatures wrap around the entire facade. Two colonnades face Wall Street, but the other three facades on William Street, Exchange Place, and Hanover Street have no colonnades. Instead, these sides contain pilasters between each bay on the second and third stories, except for the center bay, which is a large arched window. When McKim, Mead & White expanded the building, the pilasters were extended to the fourth through seventh stories of these facades.

==== Colonnades ====
The facade of the original structure featured twelve massive Ionic columns on Wall Street, each a single block of granite from Quincy, Massachusetts. These columns are each 30.67 feet (9.35 m) tall and measure 4 feet (1.2 m) in diameter. Recessed behind this colonnade is a porch, as well as rectangular brass-framed window openings on the second and third stories. In the center of the second floor is a revolving door and two single doors beneath a brass double transom. The facade was originally topped by a frieze, according to lithographs published during the 19th century. The center of the frieze contained the inscription "Erected MDCCCXXXVIII" (1838 in Roman numerals) and was flanked by carved figures in classical robes. Above the center of the frieze was a sculpture of a woman holding a staff and accompanied by motifs of a cornucopia, an eagle, a globe with a branch, and a parcel.

The 1900s renovation placed a second colonnade of Corinthian columns above the original facade. The Corinthian columns were made of granite sourced from Spruce Head, Maine, and Rockport, Massachusetts. In addition, some of the granite from the lower section of the building was reused in the upper colonnade. These columns measure 3.75 feet (1.14 m) in diameter, and their centers are spaced 14 feet (4.3 m) apart. The upper colonnade has similar dimensions to the lower colonnade, though the upper colonnade's columns have lighter proportions. The arrangement of lighter Corinthian columns above heavier Ionic columns was in keeping with a principle of classical architecture.

=== Interior ===
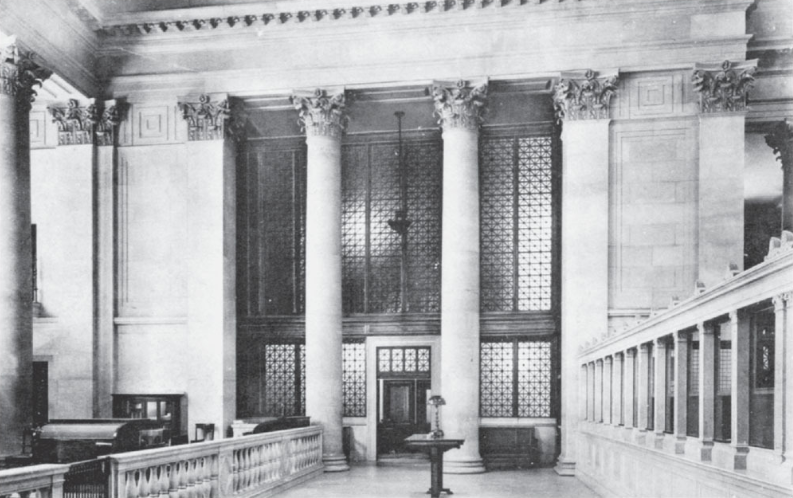
National City Bank's executive offices at 55 Wall Street (1911)

The original building's structural system is made of masonry, while the addition is built around a steel structure. The roof has a cornice with a masonry parapet that surrounds all four sides. The steel frame is placed atop pilings that descend 35 feet (11 m). The pilings were constructed as close as possible to the original walls of the Merchants' Exchange, eliminating the need to excavate the site using caissons. The building's first floor was originally one story above the street, but it was lowered to ground level during the 1900s renovation. National City Bank employees could enter and exit the building from the southwestern corner of the basement.

The interior has a total floor area of 241,000 square feet (22,400 m^{2}). The original interior was completely demolished and refurbished during McKim, Mead & White's renovation. The banking hall is designed similarly to the former waiting room of Pennsylvania Station, another project the firm designed at the same time. The spaces include marble, mahogany, and brass decorations.

==== Banking hall ====
The banking hall, a cruciform space, covers 25,000 square feet (2,300 m^{2}) and measures 187 feet (57 m) from west to east and about 120 feet (37 m) from north to south. (Note: The Chicago Daily Tribune gives slightly different dimensions of 188 feet (57 m) from west to east and 122 feet (37 m) from north to south.) When built, it was among the United States' largest banking halls. It was accessed by a pair of bronze doors on Wall Street, each weighing 3,300 pounds (1,500 kg). The room's ceiling is approximately 60 feet (18 m) tall, with an 83-foot-tall (25 m) dome (Note: Some sources cite the dome as being 72 feet (22 m) tall or 70 feet (21 m) tall.) measuring 52 feet (16 m) across. On each side are four Corinthian columns, each measuring 41 feet (12 m) tall; these support an entablature that circles the space at two-thirds of the room's height. The room also features gray floors and walls, a coffered ceiling, and delicate mezzanine railings. Light gray stone was imported from Europe for the columns and floors, and gray marble was used for the floors and walls. Above the columns, the interior was finished with artificial stone of a similar color. The ceiling is lit by bronze chandeliers; originally, there were five chandeliers that each measured 12 feet (3.7 m) across. Seals of the National City Bank were also placed throughout the space. The dome is decorated with 16 panels in low relief. Four of the panels bear the directions of the compass, and the remaining twelve have astrological signs.

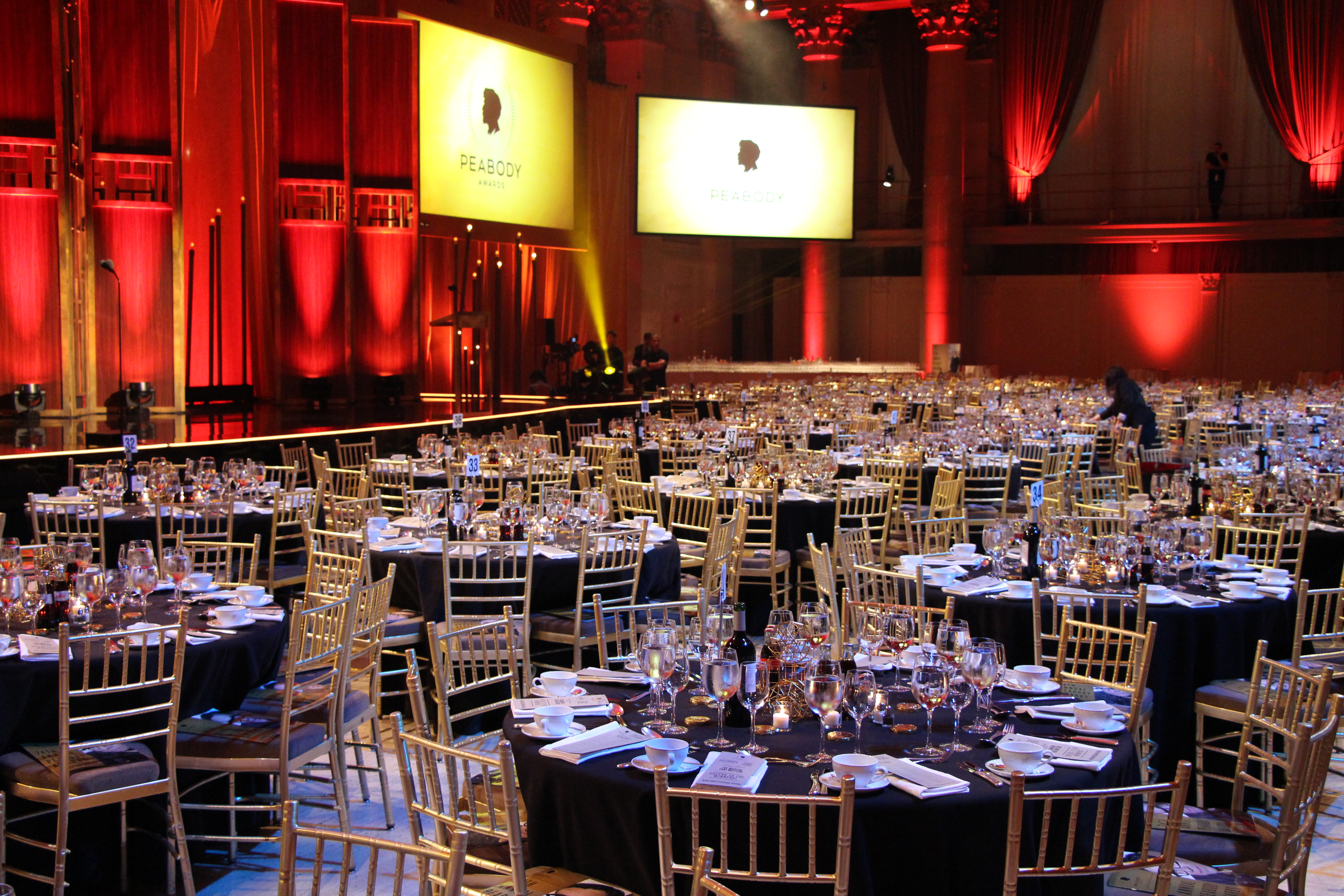
55 Wall Street banking hall, prepared for the 74th Annual Peabody Awards

The largest coffer in the ceiling is above the southern portion of the banking hall. When the National City Bank moved into the space in 1908, there was a large safe on the south side of the banking floor, which weighed 300 tons. The double-height safe measured approximately 22 by 24 feet (6.7 by 7.3 m) across and 20 feet (6.1 m) high. (Note: The Washington Post gave slightly different dimensions of 24 by 24 feet (7.3 by 7.3 m) across and 15 feet (4.6 m) across.) It was surrounded by 18-inch-thick (46 cm) steel plating and supported by steel and marble stilts that extended into the basement. If anyone attempted to break in, coils along the exterior of the safe would eject hot steam. The interior of the safe contained separate compartments for the bank's daytime and nighttime staff. The safe was moved to the basement in 1957. (Note: The New York Times in 1908 described the safe as weighing 300 short tons (270 long tons; 270 t). The same newspaper in 1957 described it as weighing 700 short tons (620 long tons; 640 t), probably adjusted for the weight of its contents. The New York City Landmarks Preservation Commission says only that the safe was moved in the "late 1950s".) There were a marble screen and bank tellers' desks around the safe, within an enclosure measuring 45 by 93 feet (14 by 28 m) across.

The Hanover Street side of the banking hall had desks for bank officers, which were separated from the rest of the room by a low marble balustrade with a gate. There were three stories of offices at each corner of the banking hall, which were originally used by the bank. The spaces were designed with few decorations. The southeastern corner of the first floor contained the six-room president's suite, which included the executive and secretary's offices, two conference rooms, a hall, and decorative restroom. Bookkeepers and National City Bank's bond and foreign departments were in each of the other corners. Conference rooms on the third floor were housed in another lavish suite. Pneumatic tubes and telegraph systems were used to transfer data between National City Bank's different departments. The office mezzanines are connected by bronze and iron balconies, which run on two sides of the room alongside the windows. A balcony was also constructed above the southern portion of the banking hall in 1925. The mezzanines had 21 smaller safes.

==== Other floors ====
In addition to the main triple-height banking hall on the first floor, there were originally offices on the fourth through seventh floors and staff facilities on the eighth floor. All of these stories surrounded a light court at the center of the building. The offices on the fourth through seventh floors had the address 53 Wall Street. these offices were rented to outside firms. Elevators for the office stories were placed at the northwestern corner of the building, near Wall and William streets. The fifth floor contained three dining rooms for office employees: one each for officers, other male workers, and other female workers. Also on the fifth floor were laundry, storage, and serving rooms, as well as a kitchen.

On the eighth floor was an attic containing facilities used by bank staff. The building's janitor lived on the northwestern corner of the eighth floor, where there was a suite with six rooms and a restroom. For officers who needed to remain at the building overnight, the eighth floor contained two bedrooms with a shared bathroom on the south side of the light court. The eastern side of the eighth floor contained National City Bank's library, while the northern side contained the No. 8 social club. The eighth floor also contained dining rooms for men and women, as well as a kitchen, ice-cream room, and kitchen. Dining rooms were also provided for officers and guests. The attic was surrounded by an outdoor patio measuring 15 feet (4.6 m) wide. Part of the patio on the eighth floor could also be used as an outdoor restaurant for employees.

In 2006, the five upper stories were converted to a residential condominium development, the Cipriani Club Residences. There are 106 condominiums in total, divided into 22 studio apartments, 62 one-bedroom apartments, 11 two-bedroom apartments, and 11 three-bedroom apartments. The development also includes the Cipriani Club, a set of private residential amenities that are available only to residents. The club includes a library, spa, business lounge, screening room, and hair salon. In addition, club members could use the building's patio and ballroom, and the Cipriani Club also hosted wine-and-cheese tasting events. When the Cipriani Club Residences were completed, residents were given two years of free club membership, after which they had to pay an annual fee.

Remnants of the building's usage by the United States Custom House included the jail cells used to detain smugglers and spies. The basement contained 12 jail cells, which were used between 1863 and 1899. Embedded in a wall were a cannonball, a keg of gunpowder, and over 100 rudimentary bombs that were believed to have been armaments for custom house employees during the New York City draft riots of 1863. During the 1900s, an elevator was installed to carry valuables between the basement and main banking floor. The safe-deposit vault on the main banking floor was relocated to the basement in 1957. The concrete floor of the basement is 10 feet (3.0 m) thick, requiring workers to blast into the floor while they were installing the vault. The basement includes heating and cooling machinery as well.

== History ==
=== Merchants' Exchange ===
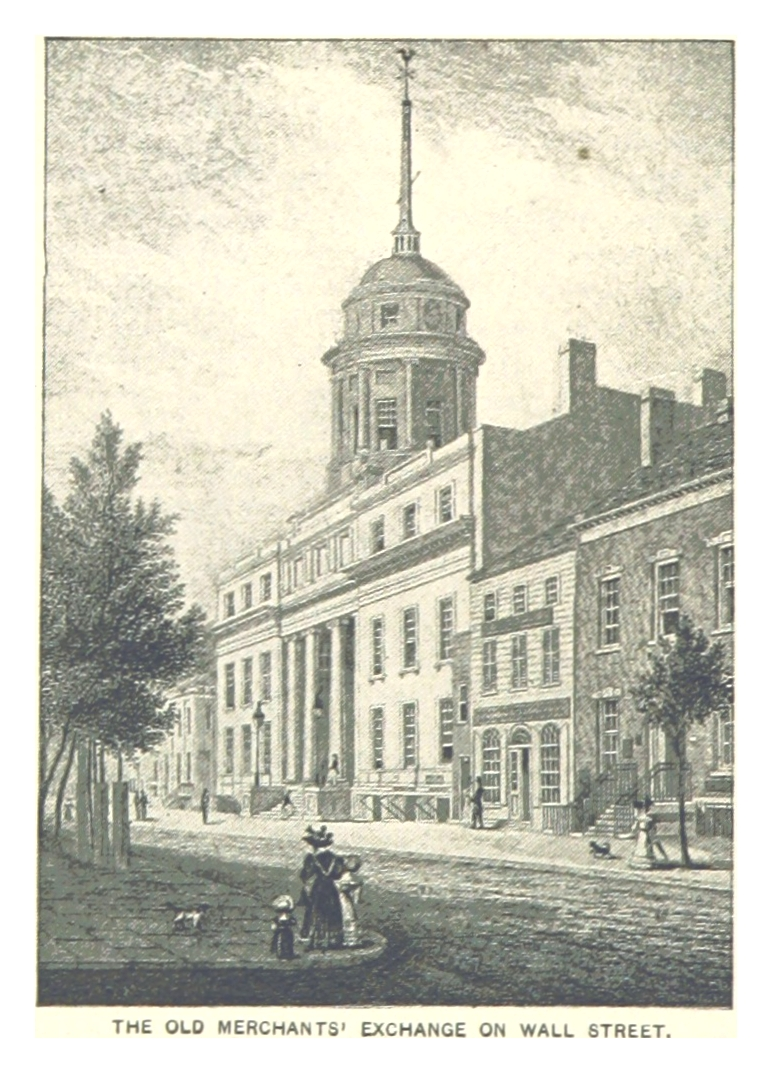
The original Merchants' Exchange was built in 1827 and destroyed December 16–17, 1835.

The site of 55 Wall Street was previously occupied by a house built in 1656 and a block of housing built in 1789. The original building of the Merchants' Exchange was erected between April 1825 and June 1827 and opened for business on May 1, 1827. It was designed in the Greek Revival style by Alexander Jackson Davis, Ithiel Town, and Samuel Thompson. The structure was two stories tall with a raised basement. It had a frontage of 114 feet (35 m) along Wall Street and a depth of 150 feet (46 m) to Exchange Place. The main facade was made of white Tuckahoe marble and the entrance portico had a marble staircase and four Ionic columns. Inside were two large trading rooms with Ionic columns. At the top of the building was a colonnaded cupola rising 120 feet (37 m). The cupola's design was inspired by that of the Old Town Hall in Manchester.

The first structure was primarily used by grain merchants, though it also had a post office, the New York Chamber of Commerce, and the New York Stock Exchange. Its presence contributed to a redevelopment of the surrounding neighborhood. In 1829, the Merchants' Exchange hired Robert Ball Hughes to sculpt a marble statue of Alexander Hamilton, one of the Founding Fathers of the United States. The statue, measuring 15 feet (4.6 m) tall, was installed in the Exchange by April 1835. (Note: Reynolds 1994, p. 96, cites the Hamilton statue as having been installed on March 28, 1835.) The Merchants' Exchange building burned down in the Great Fire of New York on December 17, 1835. Fire swept throughout lower Manhattan. Passersby brought valuable objects from other buildings into the Merchants' Exchange, in the belief that the Merchants' Exchange would survive the fire, but the building's cupola collapsed.

The Merchants' Exchange's committee of trustees proposed in February 1836 to build a larger building on the site of the older structure. The remaining lots on the block were acquired for this purpose. The same year, construction started on a new building designed by Isaiah Rogers. According to Rogers's private diaries, he moved his family to a house on the block while construction was ongoing. A time capsule was also placed within the building's foundations, though a search for the capsule in the 1990s was unsuccessful. The Quincy-granite columns were delivered as single blocks via sea; oxen pulled the columns along Wall Street from the dock to the building site. The building was completed in either 1841 or 1842. The last column was not installed until December 16, 1844, the ninth anniversary of the Great Fire. The new structure was initially occupied by the National Bank of Commerce until 1853, and a post office in the building operated until 1845. The Stock Exchange was also situated in 55 Wall Street until 1854.

=== Custom house ===
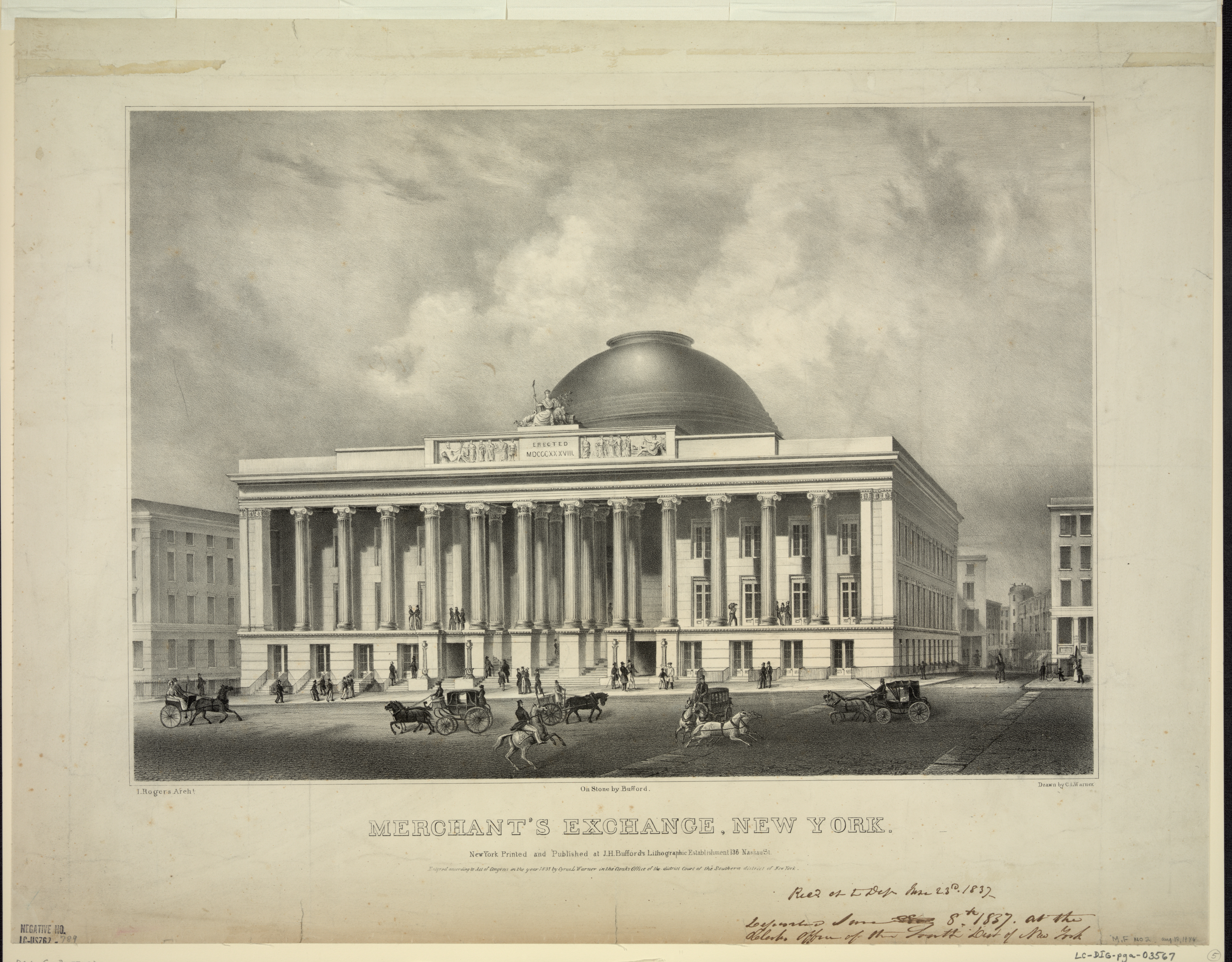
55 Wall Street as it appeared in 1842

By 1861, the New York Custom House was looking to relocate from 26 Wall Street (now Federal Hall) to 55 Wall Street. The federal government signed a lease with the Merchants' Exchange in February 1862, intending to move into the building that May, when the Merchants' Exchange was set to move out. The architect William A. Potter then renovated the building. The custom house moved to 55 Wall Street starting in August 1862. The agency's departments were relocated one at a time; the relocation was completed by December 1862. Clerks were situated in the central rotunda under the dome, while cashiers and auditors worked in the corner offices. The building's original fourth story was added around this time, about 20 years after the building had been completed. The proximity of 55 Wall Street to the Subtreasury, which had moved into the old custom house at 26 Wall Street, was particularly beneficial, since the custom house had to make payments in gold. The federal government bought 55 Wall Street outright in 1865. The building also housed other tenants, including the American Bank Note Company, who operated a currency printing plant in the penthouse between 1862 and 1867.

The Custom House on Wall Street had become overcrowded by 1887. William J. Fryer Jr., superintendent of repairs of New York City's federal-government buildings, wrote to the United States Department of the Treasury's Supervising Architect in February 1888 about the "old, damp, ill-lighted, badly ventilated" quarters at 55 Wall Street. Architecture and Building magazine called the letter "worthy of thoughtful investigation". This led to an act of Congress which authorized the selection of a site for a new custom house and appraiser's warehouse. Soon after, Fryer presented his report to the New York State Chamber of Commerce. The Chamber said in 1889 that "We have not seriously considered the removal of the present Custom House proper, since it is well located, and, if found inadequate, can easily be easily be enlarged to meet all the wants of the Government for an indefinite time to come." By the end of the century, the custom house's proximity to the Subtreasury was no longer advantageous, as it was easier to use a check or certificate to make payments on revenue than to pay with gold.

Despite opposition to the new structure, a bill to acquire land for a new custom house and sell the old building was passed in both houses of the U.S. Congress in early 1891. No progress was made until 1897, when Cass Gilbert was selected to design a new U.S. Custom House at 1 Bowling Green. James Stillman, president of National City Bank (predecessor bank of Citibank), arranged for his company to buy 55 Wall Street for its headquarters. National City Bank had grown into one of the United States' largest banks under Stillman's leadership; the bank held $13 million in deposits when he became its president in 1891, a figure that had increased to nearly $309 million when he retired in 1909. Despite this rapid growth, the bank still occupied a dilapidated space at 52 Wall Street, directly across the street to the north. The U.S. government held a pro forma public auction, in which City Bank made a formal bid for the building, and the bank agreed on July 4, 1899, to buy the building for $3.265 million. The arrangement had been facilitated by Stillman's friendships with President William McKinley and U.S. Treasury Secretary Lyman Gage. The next month, the old Custom House was sold for $3.21 million (about $105 million in 2025 (Note: Johnston, Louis; Williamson, Samuel H. (2023). "What Was the U.S. GDP Then?". MeasuringWorth. United States Gross Domestic Product deflator figures follow the MeasuringWorth series.)).

=== National City Bank ===
==== Conversion ====
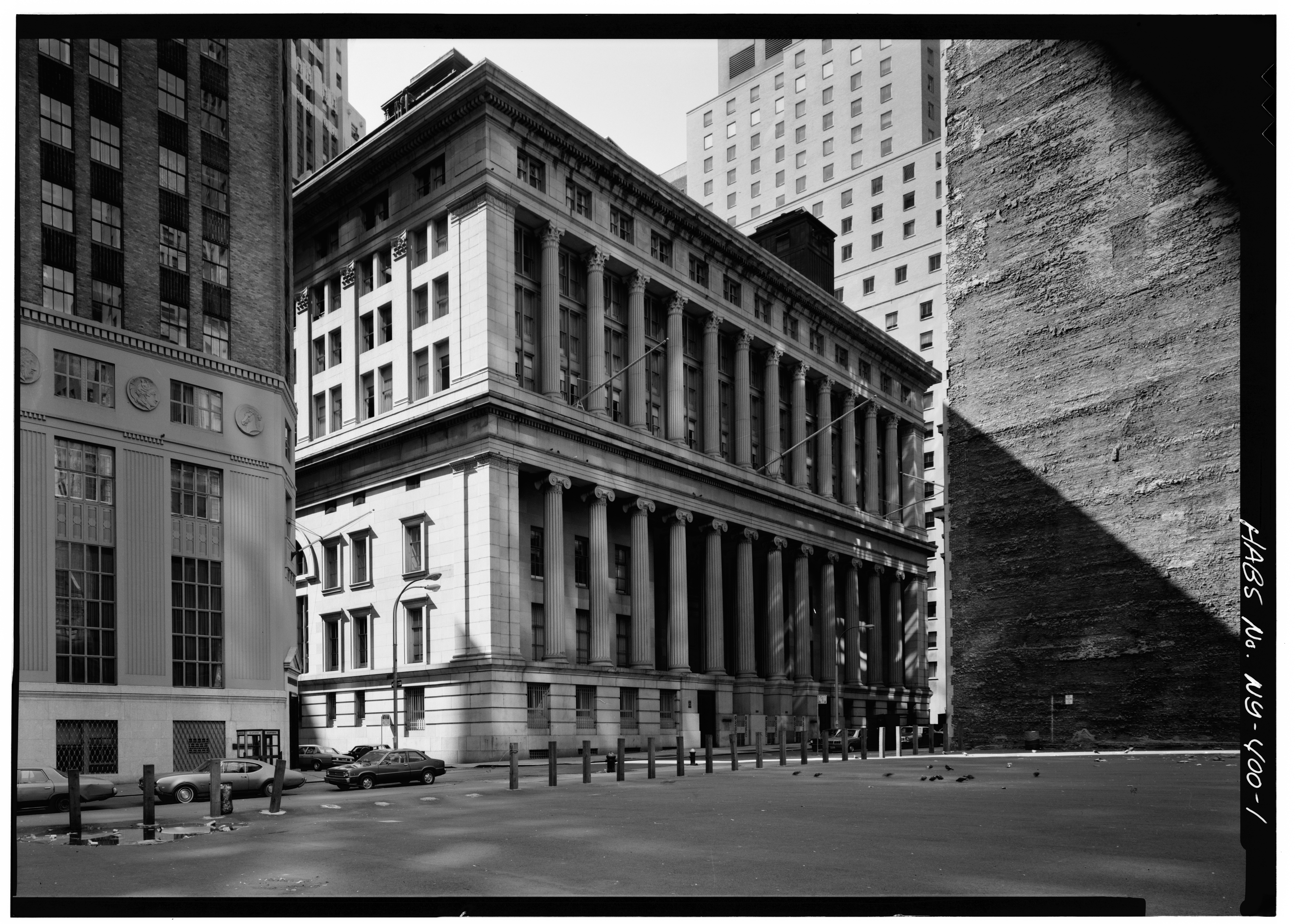
The upper five stories were added as part of the 1907–1910 renovation.

The U.S. Customs Service remained in the building for eight years after the sale, and the federal government paid City Bank $128,000 a year (about $4 million in 2025) to rent space in the building. Democrats in the House of Representatives criticized the transaction, saying Congress's decision to provide rent appropriations to the Customs Service was an "extravagant" use of money. In a vote in 1905, the House blocked an appropriation that would have paid the Customs Service's rent to City Bank. House Republicans eventually approved the rent appropriation for the building in June 1906. Meanwhile, City Bank had paid all except $40,000 of the purchase price as part of its agreement with the federal government. The bank had not yet taken title to 55 Wall Street, though the city's tax assessors valued the building at $5 million. As a result, the New York City government sued City Bank for non-payment of taxes in January 1906. Representatives of the bank said that because it had not taken title to the building, the bank should not have to pay property taxes.

Stillman, wishing to modify 55 Wall Street, had hired McKim, Mead & White in 1904. Stanford White was the original head of the project, though he died in 1906 before work started. White had suggested redesigning the building to resemble the Pantheon in Rome, and Stillman sent a City Bank vice president to Italy to study the Pantheon's architecture. The bank's officers initially advocated for replacing the Merchants' Exchange Building with a skyscraper, and members of the public worried that the building would be demolished. Until early 1907, it was unclear whether City Bank would expand the building or replace it with an 18-to-20-story structure, so the firm was asked to prepare two sets of plans. Stillman and architect Charles Follen McKim also considered developing a 23-story tower and preserving the existing building at the tower's base, as well as modifying the existing building while retaining the rotunda from Rogers's design.

The Customs Service moved its offices to Bowling Green on November 4, 1907. Four days afterward, City Bank finally took title to the building, having paid no taxes for the structure during the past eight years. After the Customs Service moved, the bank decided to expand the building. Work was delayed slightly because of the Panic of 1907. The renovation included replacing the fourth floor, adding four more floors, and completely destroying and rebuilding the interior. Contractors retained as much of the existing exterior as possible. The upper stories were constructed from 1908 to 1910, though some of the interior spaces were not completed until 1914. National City Bank moved to 55 Wall Street on December 19, 1908. Messengers carried the bank's $500 million holdings from the old office across the street in leather satchels containing at least $10,000 each. Several days later, the building opened to the public. The expansion had cost $2.3 million (about $57 million in 2025).

==== 1910s to 1940s ====
Upon the completion of the renovation, National City Bank's law firm Shearman & Sterling had offices on the upper stories. According to Forbes magazine in 1917, the branch at 55 Wall Street "does more business in its head office than is done under any other nongovernmental banking roof on the face of the earth." A balcony was constructed in 1925 on the south side of the main banking room. The bank had outgrown its offices at 55 Wall Street by February 1927, prompting bank officials to announce plans for a 31-story building on the site of its old headquarters at 52 Wall Street. National City Bank's compound interest and trust departments moved to the new building at 52 Wall Street in May 1928.

National City Bank and the Farmers' Loan and Trust Company merged in 1929, with the latter becoming the City Bank Farmers Trust Company. Two years later, City Bank Farmers Trust erected 20 Exchange Place immediately to the south to house the operations of the expanded bank. First National Bank temporarily moved to 55 Wall Street from its former location at 2 Wall Street, when that structure was weakened during the construction of an annex to 14 Wall Street, although First National returned to 2 Wall Street in 1933. 55 Wall Street and 20 Exchange Place collectively served as National City Bank's global headquarters and were connected by a now-demolished pedestrian bridge over Exchange Place. Initially, 55 Wall Street did not have any signage indicating that it housed the National City Bank. In 1947, bank officials decided to install a sign with the bank's name outside the building because visitors frequently got lost while looking for the bank.

==== 1950s to 1990s ====
National City Bank merged with the First National Bank in 1955, becoming First National City Bank; the newly merged banks were headquartered at 55 Wall Street. During the same period, the main banking room at 55 Wall Street underwent a multi-year restoration that finished in 1958. The two-story safe-deposit vault was moved to the basement between September and November 1957. Shortly afterward, in March 1958, City Bank Farmers Trust took over the construction of a skyscraper on 399 Park Avenue, which the Astor family had previously been developing. First National initially considered relocating all of its operations to Park Avenue. By 1959, the bank had decided to relocate its national and international divisions, as well as administrative offices for its New York City branches, to Park Avenue while retaining its legal headquarters and some departments at 55 Wall Street. The Park Avenue headquarters opened in 1961, although First National retained 55 Wall Street as a downtown headquarters.

The New York City Landmarks Preservation Commission (LPC) designated 55 Wall Street's exterior as one of the city's earliest official landmarks in 1965. Through the late 20th century, Citibank continued to operate a full-service retail branch at 55 Wall Street called Branch #001. It also remained a substantial location for private banking operations. A universal tellers' station, which allowed tellers to perform multiple banking functions, was installed in the banking hall in 1979, and part of the exterior parapet wall was restored during that time. The Walker Group designed the renovation, while the A. J. Construction Company was the main contractor. By then, the banking hall had not been open to the public for several years, but Citibank had declined several developers' offers to buy the building. The renovations entailed removing escalators and platforms that had been installed in the 1950s, as well as the installation of new counters and a partition wall that ran diagonally across the banking room.

The developer George Klein bought 363,000 square feet (33,700 m^{2}) of the unused air rights on 55 Wall Street's site in 1983 as part of the construction of the adjacent 60 Wall Street; (Note: New York City zoning sets a maximum floor area for each land lot, after which developers must buy air rights to increase their floor area. Owners of buildings that contain less than their maximum floor area can sell air rights to developers who own adjacent sites.) the LPC supported this move. Shearman & Sterling moved out of 55 Wall Street in 1987. The developer Philip Pilevsky, along with three principals of the Newmark Group, agreed to buy the building in early 1987. Pilevsky and his associates Jeffrey Gural and Barry Gosin, both of the Newmark Group, bought 55 Wall Street later that year for $49 million. Newmark began looking for tenants to occupy more than half of the building's space. Milgrim Thomajan & Lee, a large law firm based in Midtown Manhattan, agreed to lease 120,000 square feet (11,000 m^{2}), becoming one of the building's major tenants in the 1980s and early 1990s.

=== Later use ===
==== 1990s proposals ====
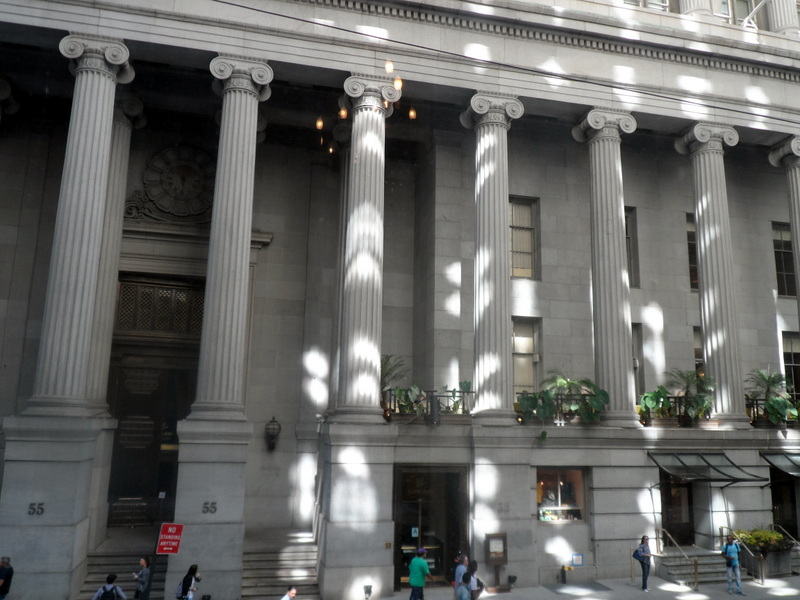
Lower colonnade (2013)

Gural, Gosin, and Pilevsky spent over $20 million to renovate the building. While the renovation was ongoing, the building's chief engineer won a $3 million lottery jackpot and resigned. The group sold 55 Wall Street in 1990 to a group of private Japanese investors for $69 million. The buyer was later identified as Tokyo-based builders Kajima. Citibank closed its branch bank in 1992, and Migrim Thomajan & Lee went bankrupt. Afterward, 55 Wall Street was used mostly for film shoots, since the rotunda was unoccupied and much of the office space on the upper floors was also vacant. The building was depicted in advertisements, like those for Cadillac and the mutual funds company PNC Inc., as well as in films such as Batman Forever and Die Hard with a Vengeance. 55 Wall Street's various landmark statuses precluded potential tenants from easily renovating the exterior, and the rotunda was only attractive to large retailers, while office tenants were relegated to a side entrance. Kajima subsidiary Commercial Development had tried to lease the banking hall to a retailer, such as CompUSA or Barnes & Noble, and it enlarged an existing loading dock on Exchange Place to attract retail tenants.

Despite the lack of potential tenants for the rotunda, several firms had shown interest in leasing the office space. Real estate developer Donald Trump offered to buy 55 Wall Street in 1996 for $20 million, which he stated was a bargain cost. At the time, many tenants had left the building after their leases had expired, and an excess of vacant office space in Lower Manhattan had reduced property values in the area. Trump ultimately decided not to buy 55 Wall Street, and one of Credit Suisse First Boston's subsidiaries instead purchased the building for $21.15 million. Credit Suisse wanted to convert 55 Wall Street into a residential structure or a hotel.

==== Conversion to event venue, hotel, and residences ====
In September 1997, the building was sold again to a group headed by restaurant-and-ballroom company Cipriani S.A., businessman Sidney Kimmel, and Hotel Jerome operator T. Richard Butera for $27 million. By that point, there was high demand for luxury hotels in Lower Manhattan. Starting the next year, building was completely renovated into a luxury hotel. The banking room became a ballroom and luxury restaurant space called Cipriani Wall Street. Midway through the renovation, Cipriani was replaced with Regent Hotels & Resorts as the prospective operator of the hotel. Kimmel also bought out Cipriani's share of the management contract for 55 Wall Street. The Regent Wall Street Hotel opened in 2000 with 144 guest rooms, a restaurant, and a fitness center. After the September 11 attacks destroyed the nearby World Trade Center in 2001, 55 Wall Street served as a relief center for workers and area residents and was used by Tribeca Film Festival attendees. The hotel was the venue for the reception and after party for the 2002 wedding of David Gest and Liza Minnelli. The hotel's overall business declined, leading to its closure in 2003.

Cipriani and developer Steve Witkoff formed a partnership in 2004, converting the defunct hotel rooms into a residential condominium development called the Cipriani Club Residences. Louise Sunshine was hired to sell the apartments through her company Sunshine Group, and tenants began buying apartments in November 2005. Two early residents, actor Mickey Rourke and supermodel Naomi Campbell, appeared in advertisements for the Cipriani Club Residences in exchange for discounts on the building's condominiums. Sunshine Group had sold 37 of the 106 condominiums by February 2006, when Witkoff hired a new leasing agent, Douglas Elliman. The buyers of the remaining condominiums included financiers; two friends of Sarah, Duchess of York; and soccer captain Claudio Reyna. Most of the studios and one-bedroom apartments had been sold by mid-2006, though the two- and three-bedroom apartments were still being completed.

The main banking floor remained in use as the Cipriani Wall Street event venue, which hosted the Peabody Awards from 2015 to 2019. In May 2020, amid a loss of income during the COVID-19 pandemic in New York City, Cipriani defaulted on a mortgage loan that had been placed on its event venues at 110 East 42nd Street and 55 Wall Street. A special servicer took over the mortgage in 2021, but the two event venues were at risk of foreclosure by the end of that year. By June 2022, King Street Capital Management was considering giving Cipriani $150 million to refinance the debt on 110 East 42nd Street and 55 Wall Street. That September, W. P. Carey gave Cipriani a $52.1 million commercial mortgage-backed securities loan and a $28 million mezzanine loan for the two properties.

== Reception and landmark designations ==
James Stillman said that 55 Wall Street's 1900s expansion was meant to be an "outward and visible sign of power and combination". One writer characterized the design as "a temple of finance" that was "one of the most opulent banking houses in the United States", and The New York Times dubbed it a "temple of capitalism". Architectural criticism was mixed. The author Peter James Hudson wrote that some critics praised Stillman for retaining the old structure rather than replacing it with a modern skyscraper. Stillman's immediate successor Frank A. Vanderlip had preferred such a tower because he predicted that National City Bank would quickly outgrow the space. Hudson wrote that other critics "viewed the renovation as an aesthetic aberration", especially with regards to the juxtaposition of the colonnades. After the building was renovated in the late 1970s, architectural writer Ada Louise Huxtable described the renovations as "laudable" and that "it would be nice to be able to say that the results are as good as the intentions".

The interior was critically acclaimed: the fourth edition of the AIA Guide to New York City called the interior a "facility unequaled in America", and the converted banking hall was described as among the world's "most elegant ballrooms". Historian Leland M. Roth wrote that the banking hall was "one of the great spaces in the city" because of its "sheer magnitude". In 1972, the Times described 55 Wall Street's banking hall as one of several "notable interior spaces" in New York City, along with the banking halls of 14 Wall Street, 23 Wall Street, and 110 East 42nd Street; the Chamber of Commerce Building's great hall; the Cunard Building's lobby; and the Bowling Green Custom House's rotunda.

The New York City Landmarks Preservation Commission designated the building's exterior as a landmark on December 21, 1965, even though First National City Bank had opposed the designation. 55 Wall Street was also listed on the National Register of Historic Places in 1972, and it was further designated a National Historic Landmark in 1978, marking the building as a site that adds "exceptional value to the nation". The building was added to the New York State Register of Historic Places in 1980 as well. The LPC designated the banking floor's interior as a city landmark on January 12, 1999. Additionally, in 2007, the building was designated as a contributing property to the Wall Street Historic District, a NRHP district.

== See also ==
- List of New York City Designated Landmarks in Manhattan below 14th Street
- List of National Historic Landmarks in New York City
- National Register of Historic Places listings in Manhattan below 14th Street
