= David Gest =

American producer and entertainer (1953–2016)

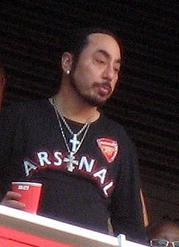
- Gest in 2007
- Born: David Alan Gest; May 11, 1953; Los Angeles, California, U.S.
- Died: April 12, 2016 (aged 62); London, England
- Occupations: Producer; television personality; entertainer
- Years active: 1970–2016
- Spouse: Liza Minnelli (m. 2002; div. 2007)

David Alan Gest (May 11, 1953 – April 12, 2016) was an American producer and television personality. Gest founded the American Cinema Awards Foundation in 1983. He produced the television special Michael Jackson: 30th Anniversary Celebration in 2001, which was the last reunion of Michael Jackson and the Jacksons coming almost 17 years after their previous reunion. Gest appeared on the 2006 series of the British reality television show I'm a Celebrity... Get Me Out of Here!. He frequently made tabloid headlines during his marriage with Liza Minnelli. In 2016, Gest appeared in Celebrity Big Brother 17 in the UK but elected to leave the show after 13 days due to "medical reasons". This resulted him finishing in 13th place.

== Career ==
=== Early success ===
At the age of 17, Gest landed a job as a publicist at London Records by passing himself off as 24. Nearly a year later, he was promoted to national director of publicity and transferred over to the New York office of the label. Singer Al Green encouraged him to start a P.R. and management firm, and at age 18, he created David Gest & Associates. Green became his first client and mentor. Shortly after, he had 25 artists on his roster and generated vast success.

=== Later years ===
Gest finished in fourth place on the 2006 series of I'm a Celebrity...Get Me Out of Here!, a day before the show finished. Two days later, Gest appeared on the Royal Variety Show in London in front of Prince Charles, for which he received a standing ovation. Another two days later, a controversy arose on the cover of two major UK papers stating that more than 30,000 text votes were not counted in Gest's favour when the network ITV had a voting glitch. This would have changed the outcome of the show but Gest declined a recount.

In January 2007, Gest appeared as a judge on ITV1's Soapstar Superstar, for one night replacing Michael Ball who was coaching the singers. Later that month it was announced that Gest had signed a one-year deal with ITV to appear in his own reality series entitled This Is David Gest, which began on April 22, 2007. He also took cameras for a rare glimpse of the Jackson family house in Encino, California, where he met Tito Jackson and his children as well as matriarch Katherine Jackson. He was one of the four judges on ITV1's entertainment series Grease Is the Word and also starred on Greased Lightnin'. In 2007, Gest also appeared in an episode of Gordon Ramsay's The F Word.

Gest paid ITV to be released from his contract early and ITV replied that they had no idea what to do with him. Gest was quick to say that he wanted to be released: "My lawyers negotiated an early release so I could host The Friday Night Project on Channel 4", Gest told The Sun.

Gest was a guest on Celebrity Fantasy Homes with Gaby Roslin.

=== Plot to kill Elton John ===
In 2017, the Associated Press carried a report claiming that Gest had attempted to have Elton John killed. Gest was reportedly infuriated by a reference John made to Gest's sexuality after Gest's marriage to Liza Minnelli. The alleged plot did not progress.

== Personal life ==
Gest was born to a Jewish family in Los Angeles and grew up in Southern California.

Gest and Liza Minnelli were married on March 16, 2002, and separated in July 2003. In October 2003, he sued her for $10 million, claiming that she had been violent and physically abusive during their marriage, behavior the affidavit blamed on Minnelli's persistent alcoholism. Minnelli denied the accusations, claiming Gest was simply after her money. The suit was dismissed in September 2006 for lack of triable issue of fact.

Gest was a close friend of Michael Jackson, and after Jackson's death, he produced and starred in a documentary film about his life called Michael Jackson: The Life of an Icon.

=== Death ===
On April 12, 2016, Gest was found dead in his room at the Four Seasons Hotel in East London's Canary Wharf financial estate. He was 62 years old. Police described his death as involving no suspicious circumstances. It was later reported that he had died from a stroke. Before his death, Gest had been arranging a new tour entitled David Gest Is Not Dead but Alive With Soul, in reference to a misunderstanding on Celebrity Big Brother in which fellow housemate Tiffany "New York" Pollard mistakenly believed Gest had died. Angie Bowie had told Pollard that "David's dead", meaning her former husband David Bowie, whose death had been announced that evening; Gest had gone to bed early feeling unwell. Despite Gest's death, the tour went ahead.

After his death, sources revealed that Gest had been addicted to gambling; friends reported that he had amassed debts of £500,000 before his death.

Gest's funeral service was held at Golders Green Crematorium in North London on April 29, 2016. His ashes were scattered in York.

== Bibliography ==
- Simply the Gest (Headline, 2007) ISBN 9780755316960
