= Liza Minnelli =

American actress, singer, and dancer (born 1946)

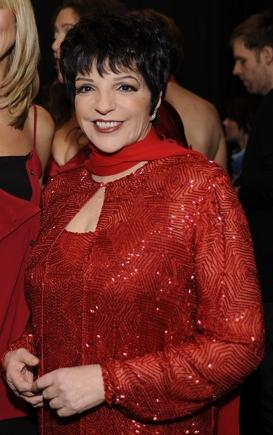
- Minnelli in 2008
- Born: Liza May Minnelli; March 12, 1946 (age 80); Los Angeles, California, U.S.
- Occupations: Actress; singer; dancer
- Years active: 1949–present
- Works: Discography; performances
- Spouses: Peter Allen (m. 1967; div. 1974); Jack Haley Jr. (m. 1974; div. 1979); Mark Gero (m. 1979; div. 1992); David Gest (m. 2002; div. 2007)
- Parents: Vincente Minnelli; Judy Garland
- Relatives: Lorna Luft (half-sister)
- Awards: Full list
- Musical career
- Genres: Traditional pop; musical theater; vocal; disco
- Labels: Capitol; A&M; Columbia; Epic; Angel; Decca

Liza May Minnelli (/ˈlaɪzə/ LY-zə; born March 12, 1946) is an American actress, singer, and dancer. Known for her commanding stage presence and powerful alto singing voice, Minnelli has received numerous accolades, including an Academy Award, a BAFTA Award, an Emmy Award, two Golden Globe Awards, and four Tony Awards. She is one of the few performers awarded a non-competitive EGOT having received an honorary Grammy Award. Minnelli is a Knight of the French Legion of Honour.

Minnelli's parents were actress and singer Judy Garland and director Vincente Minnelli. After moving to New York City in 1961, she began her career as a musical theater actress, nightclub performer, and traditional pop artist. She made her professional stage debut in the Off-Broadway revival of Best Foot Forward (1963). She became known for her collaborations with John Kander and Fred Ebb, and later won the Tony Award for Best Actress in a Musical for her roles in the Broadway musicals Flora the Red Menace (1965) and The Act (1978). She was Tony-nominated for The Rink (1984). She won Special Tony Awards for Liza at the Winter Garden (1974) and Liza's at The Palace.... (2009).

On film, Minnelli had her breakthrough performance in the drama film The Sterile Cuckoo (1969), earning her a nomination for the Academy Award for Best Actress. She later received the award playing Sally Bowles in the musical film Cabaret (1972), which brought her to international prominence. She starred in a string of films, including Golden Globe nominated performances in Lucky Lady (1975), New York, New York (1977) and Arthur (1981). On television, she had a career resurgence as a recurring guest star on the sitcom Arrested Development (2003–2013).

Her concert performances at Carnegie Hall in 1979 and 1987 and at Radio City Music Hall in 1991 and 1992 are recognized among her most successful. From 1988 to 1990, she toured with Frank Sinatra and Sammy Davis Jr. in Frank, Liza & Sammy: The Ultimate Event. Minnelli is known for her renditions of American standards and is known for her signature songs which include "New York, New York", "Cabaret", and "Maybe This Time". Throughout her later years, she has suffered serious health problems and avoided huge concerts in favor of small retrospective performances. Her life was profiled in the 2024 documentary, Liza: A Truly Terrific Absolutely True Story and her 2026 memoir Kids, Wait Till You Hear This! which topped the New York Times Best Seller list.

== Early life ==
Minnelli was born on March 12, 1946, at the Cedars of Lebanon Hospital in Hollywood. She is the daughter of Judy Garland and Vincente Minnelli. Her parents named her after Ira Gershwin's song "Liza (All the Clouds'll Roll Away)". Minnelli has a half-sister, Lorna, and half-brother, Joey, from Garland's marriage to Sid Luft. She has another half-sister, Christiane Nina Minnelli (nicknamed Tina Nina), from her father's second marriage. Minnelli's godparents were Kay Thompson and Ira Gershwin.

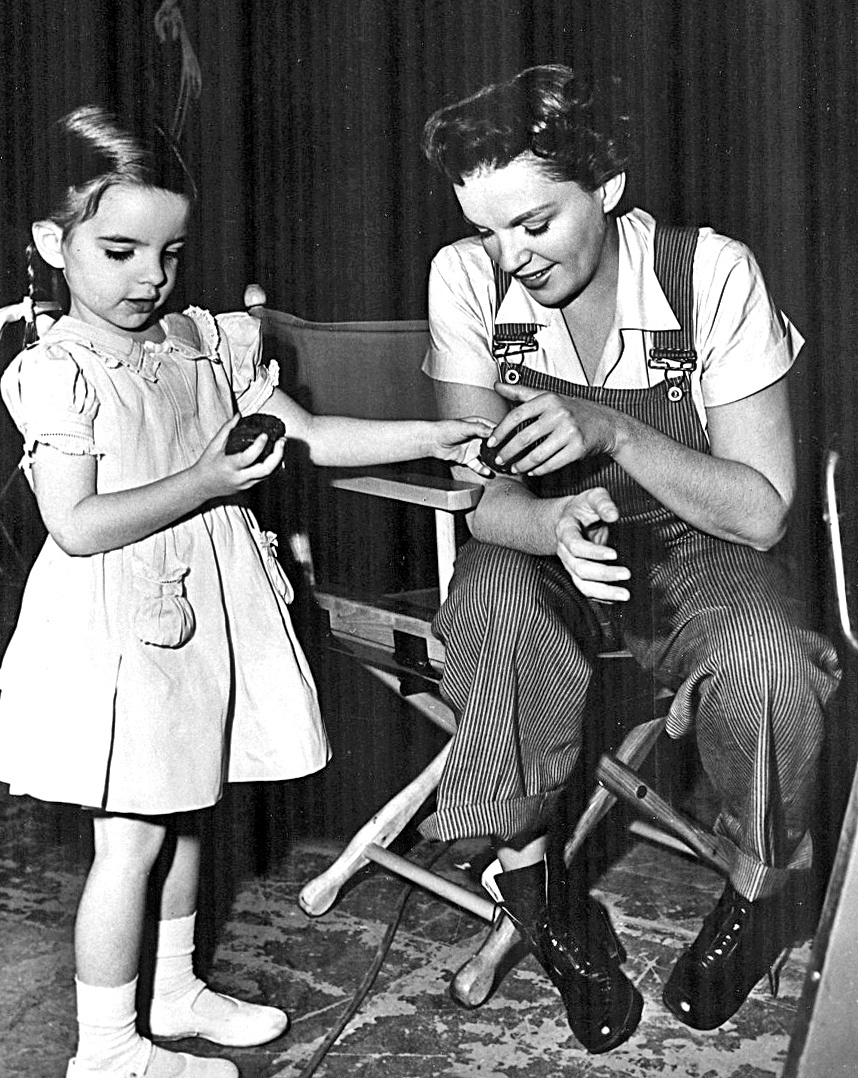
Minnelli with her mother on the set of Summer Stock in 1950

Minnelli's first performing experience on film was at age three, appearing in the final scene of the musical In the Good Old Summertime (1949); the film stars Garland and Van Johnson. In 1961, she moved to New York City, attending High School of Performing Arts and later, Chadwick School.

== Career ==
=== Theater ===
During 1961, Minnelli was an apprentice at the Cape Cod Melody Tent in Hyannis, Massachusetts. She appeared in the chorus of Flower Drum Song and played the part of Muriel in Take Me Along. She began performing professionally at the age of 17 in 1963 in an Off-Broadway revival of the musical Best Foot Forward, for which she received the Theatre World Award, and also toured in The Fantasticks, opposite Elliott Gould.

The next year, her mother invited her to perform with her in concert at the London Palladium. Both concerts were recorded and released as an album. Minnelli attended Scarsdale High School for one year, starring in a production of The Diary of Anne Frank that then went to Israel on tour. She turned to Broadway at 19, and won her first Tony Award as a leading actress for Flora the Red Menace. It was the first time that she worked with the musical pair John Kander and Fred Ebb.

=== Music ===
Minnelli recording in 1971

Minnelli began as a nightclub singer as a teenager, making her professional nightclub debut at the age of 19 at the Shoreham Hotel in Washington, D.C. That same year she began appearing in other clubs and on stage in Las Vegas, Los Angeles, Chicago, Miami, and New York City. Her success as a live performer led her to record several albums for Capitol Records: Liza! Liza! (1964), It Amazes Me (1965), and There Is a Time (1966). In her early years, she recorded traditional pop standards as well as show tunes from various musicals in which she starred. Because of this fact, William Ruhlmann named her "Barbra Streisand's little sister". The Capitol albums Liza! Liza!, It Amazes Me, and There Is a Time were reissued on the two-CD compilation The Capitol Years in 2001, in their entirety.

From 1968 to the 1970s, Minnelli also recorded her albums Liza Minnelli (1968), Come Saturday Morning and New Feelin' (both 1970) for A&M Records. In 1973, Minnelli sang back up with Ronnie Spector for Alice Cooper's song "Teenage Lament '74" from the album Muscle of Love (1973). She released her solo albums The Singer (1973) and Tropical Nights (1977) on Columbia Records.

In 1989, Minnelli collaborated with the Pet Shop Boys on Results, an electronic dance-style album. The release hit the top 10 in the UK and charted in the U.S., spawning four singles: "Losing My Mind"; "Don't Drop Bombs"; "So Sorry, I Said"; and "Love Pains". Later that year, she performed "Losing My Mind" live at the Grammy Awards ceremony before receiving a Grammy Legend Award (the first Grammy Legend Awards were issued in 1990 to Minnelli, Andrew Lloyd Webber, Smokey Robinson, and Willie Nelson). With this award, she became one of only 16 people—a list that includes composer Richard Rodgers, Whoopi Goldberg, Barbra Streisand, and John Gielgud and others—to win an Emmy, Grammy, Tony Award and Academy Award.

In April 1992, Minnelli appeared at the tribute concert for her late friend Freddie Mercury, performing "We Are the Champions" with the surviving members of the rock band Queen at Wembley Stadium in London. In 1996, Minnelli released a studio album titled Gently. It was a recording of jazz standards and included contemporary songs such as the cover of Does He Love You which she performed as a duet with Donna Summer. This album brought her a Grammy nomination for Best Traditional Pop Vocal Performance.

In 2006, Minnelli appeared on My Chemical Romance's third studio album, The Black Parade (2006), providing backing vocals and singing a solo part with Gerard Way on the track "Mama". Minnelli was nominated in 2009 for Best Traditional Pop Vocal Album for her studio recording Liza's at the Palace...!, based on her hit Broadway show. Minnelli released an album on the Decca Records label titled Confessions on September 21, 2010.

=== Film ===
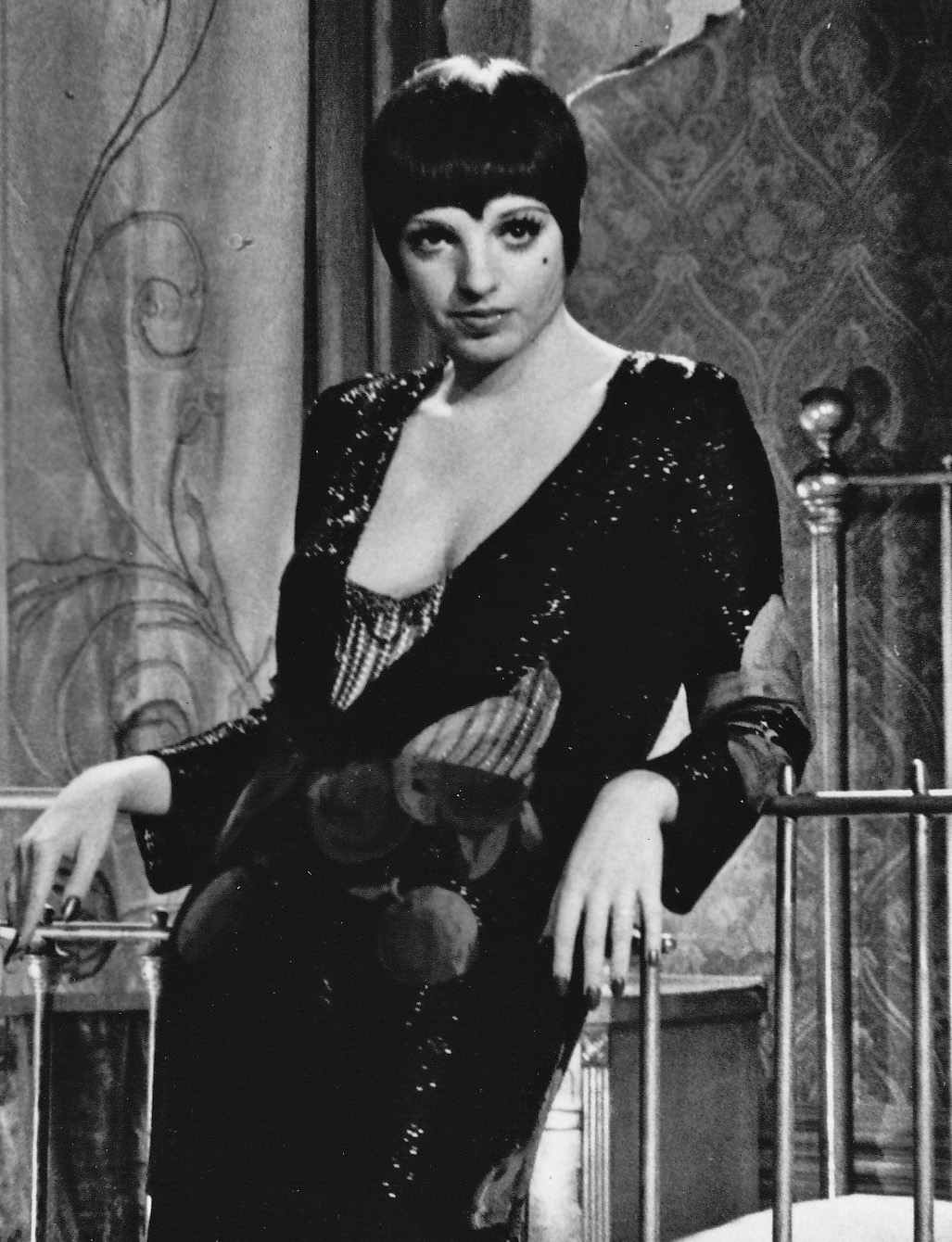
As Sally Bowles in Cabaret, 1972

Minnelli's first appearance on film is as the baby in the final shot of her mother's film In the Good Old Summertime (1949). Her first credited film role was as the love interest in Charlie Bubbles (1967), Albert Finney's only film as director and star, although four years earlier, she did voiceover work for the animated film Journey Back to Oz, a sequel to The Wizard of Oz. Minnelli was the voice of Dorothy (a character played in the earlier film by her mother, Judy Garland) in what would have been her first credited film role had it been released in 1964 as planned—the Filmation production was delayed, eventually being released in the UK during 1972.

Minnelli appeared in The Sterile Cuckoo (1969), Alan J. Pakula's first feature film as Director, as Pookie Adams, a needy, eccentric teenager. Her performance was nominated for the Academy Award for Best Actress in a Leading Role. She played another eccentric character in Tell Me That You Love Me, Junie Moon (1970), directed by Otto Preminger. A nude scene in that film, filmed in a Massachusetts cemetery, resulted in a misdemeanor complaint by family of those buried there, and a "Liza Minnelli Bill" was introduced the following year to penalise filming in Massachusetts cemeteries without permission.

Minnelli appeared in her best-known film role, Sally Bowles, in the film version of Cabaret (1972). She said that one of the things she did to prepare was to study photographs of actresses Louise Glaum and Louise Brooks and the dark-haired women of the era in which the film is set. Minnelli won the Academy Award for Best Actress in a Leading Role for her performance, along with a Golden Globe Award, BAFTA Award, and also Sant Jordi Award and David di Donatello Award for Best Foreign Actress.

Following the success of Cabaret, Bob Fosse and Minnelli teamed for Liza with a "Z", a concert for television that aired twice, then was not seen again until a 2005 restoration.

Minnelli appeared in three expensive flops in three years, with Variety suggesting by 1978 that she was the number-one choice for box office poison. First was Lucky Lady (1975), then she worked with her father in A Matter of Time (1976), co-starring Ingrid Bergman and then New York, New York (1977), which gave Minnelli her best known signature song. She sometimes performed duets on stage with Frank Sinatra, who recorded a cover version (for his Trilogy: Past Present Future album).

Minnelli made fewer film appearances from then on, but her next film, Arthur (1981), where she starred as Dudley Moore's love interest, was a big hit. She returned to film for Rent-A-Cop and Arthur 2: On the Rocks (both 1988) and Stepping Out (1991), a musical comedy drama. She later appeared in The Oh in Ohio in 2006, which received only a limited release in theaters.

=== Television ===
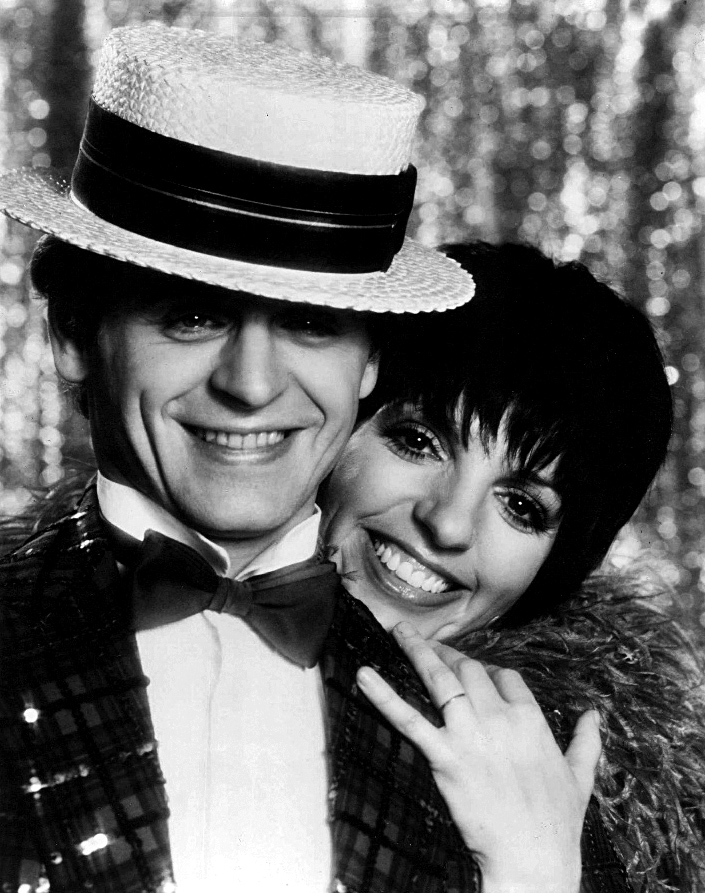
With Mikhail Baryshnikov in Baryshnikov on Broadway, 1980

During the 1950s, Minnelli appeared as a child guest on Art Linkletter's show and sang and danced with Gene Kelly on his first television special in 1959. She was a guest star in one episode of Ben Casey and was a frequent guest on chat shows of the day, including making numerous appearances on shows hosted by Jack Paar, Merv Griffin, Mike Douglas, Joe Franklin, Dinah Shore and Johnny Carson. During the 1960s, she made several guest appearances on Rowan & Martin's Laugh-In as well as other variety shows such as The Ed Sullivan Show, The Hollywood Palace, and The Judy Garland Show.

In 1964, Minnelli appeared as Minnie in her first television dramatic role in the episode "Nightingale for Sale" on Craig Stevens's short-lived series Mr. Broadway. In 1965, she starred in the television special, The Dangerous Christmas of Red Riding Hood. A soundtrack was released to coincide with the specials. In 1970, she headlined her first television special, entitled Liza, with guest stars Anthony Newley, and Randy Newman. In 1972, she starred in the Bob Fosse-directed Liza with a Z.

In 1980, she made two television specials, Goldie and Liza Together, with Goldie Hawn, and An Evening with Liza Minnelli. In 1984, she made a guest appearance as Princess Alecia in "The Princess and the Pea" episode of Faerie Tale Theatre. In 1985, she starred in a made-for-TV movie, A Time to Live, and in 1988, she appeared in Sam Found Out: A Triple Play.

In December 1992, American Public Television aired Liza Minnelli Live from Radio City Music Hall produced by Phil Ramone and Chris Giordano. The show received six Emmy nominations and won the Emmy Award for Outstanding Individual Achievement in Music and Lyrics, awarded to Fred Ebb and John Kander. This was followed by appearances in two more made-for-TV movies: Parallel Lives, and The West Side Waltz, in 1994 and 1995, respectively.

Much later in her career, Minnelli made appearances on shows such as a recurring role on Arrested Development and guest spots on Law & Order: Criminal Intent, Drop Dead Diva, and Smash. In the UK, she appeared on the Ruby Wax, Graham Norton and Jonathan Ross shows, and in October 2006, participated in a comedy skit on Charlotte Church's show and was featured on Michael Parkinson's show.

In November 2009, American Public Television aired Liza's at the Palace, taped from September 30 to October 1, 2009, in Las Vegas at the MGM Grand Hollywood Theater. The executive producers of the taping, Craig Zadan and Neil Meron, were previously involved with the 2005 rerelease of 1972's Emmy- and Peabody Award-winning Liza with a Z.

=== Later career ===
Minnelli returned to Broadway in 1997, taking over the title role in the musical Victor/Victoria, replacing Julie Andrews. In his review, New York Times critic Ben Brantley wrote "her every stage appearance is perceived as a victory of show-business stamina over psychic frailty. She asks for love so nakedly and earnestly, it seems downright vicious not to respond."

After a serious case of viral encephalitis in 2000, doctors predicted that Minnelli would spend the rest of her life in a wheelchair and perhaps not be able to speak again. However, taking vocal and dance lessons daily (especially with Sam Harris, Luigi Faccuito, Ron Lewis, and Angela Bacari), she managed to recover. She appeared on a September 19, 2001, episode of The Rosie O'Donnell Show, notable because it was Rosie's first show back following the September 11 attacks. Despite having had vocal surgery shortly before, she sang her signature song, "New York, New York", and received an enthusiastic ovation. She also returned to the stage in 2001 when asked by long-time friend Michael Jackson to perform at Madison Square Garden in New York City where she sang "Never Never Land" and the televised "You Are Not Alone" at the Michael Jackson: 30th Anniversary Special concert produced by future husband David Gest. Minnelli told reporters: "I am stable as a table."

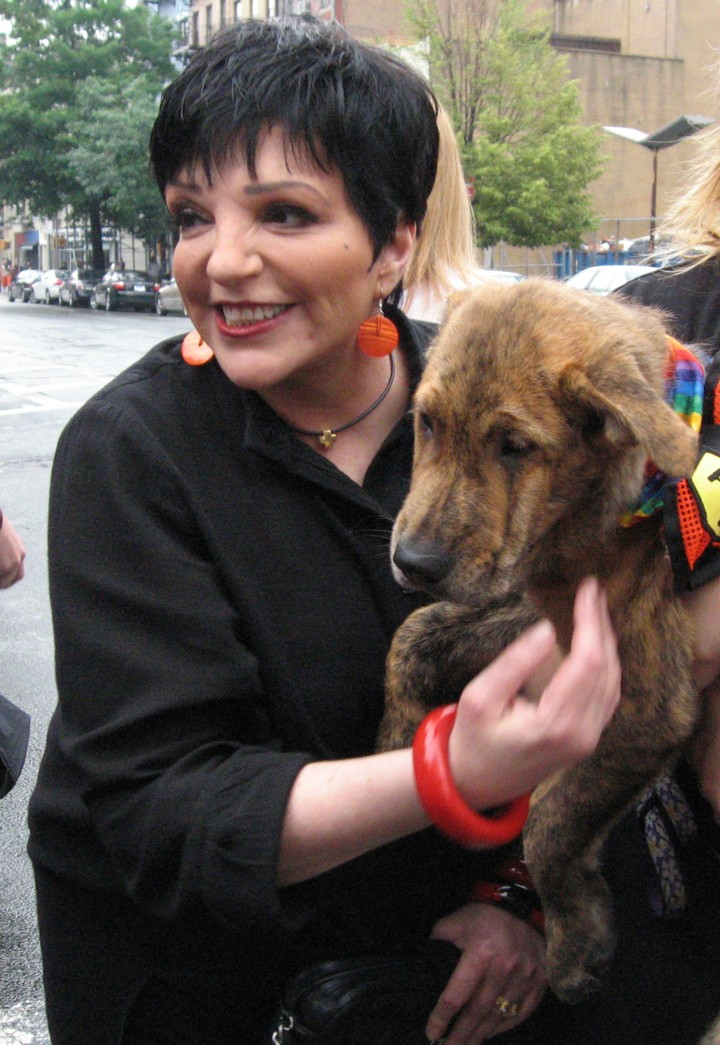
Minnelli judges a pet contest in the West Village, 2006

Gest was so impressed with Minnelli's stamina and ability to stun audiences that he produced her in Liza's Back in Spring 2002, performing to rave reviews in London and New York City. The tour featured a tribute to her mother: after years of declining fans' pleas for her to sing Garland's signature song "Over the Rainbow", she concluded Act 1 with the final refrain of her mother's anthem to an instant ovation.

From 2003 through 2005, she appeared as a recurring character on the Emmy Award-winning TV sitcom Arrested Development as Lucille Austero (also known as "Lucille 2"), the lover of both the sexually and socially awkward Buster Bluth and Buster's brother Gob. Minnelli appeared in the role for the show's fourth season in 2013.

On December 14, 2004, Minnelli made her first appearance in the UK after a long absence, performing as a special guest at the annual Royal Variety Performance. The performance was presented by the BBC, and was attended by Charles, Prince of Wales. It was staged at the London Coliseum, celebrating both its centenary year and the theater's re-opening after an extensive four-year restoration.

In 2005, Minnelli made her first film appearance in more than 15 years, in The Oh in Ohio.

In September 2006, Minnelli made a guest appearance on the long-running drama Law & Order: Criminal Intent in "Masquerade", a Halloween-themed episode, broadcast on October 31, 2006.

Minnelli also completed guest vocals on My Chemical Romance's 2006 concept album The Black Parade, portraying "Mother War", a dark conception of the main character's mother in the song "Mama".

In 2007, it was announced that Minnelli was working on an album in tribute to Kay Thompson. This turned into Minnelli's return to Broadway in a new solo concert at the Palace Theatre titled Liza's at The Palace...!, which ran from December 3, 2008, through January 4, 2009. In her second act, she performed a series of numbers created by Thompson.

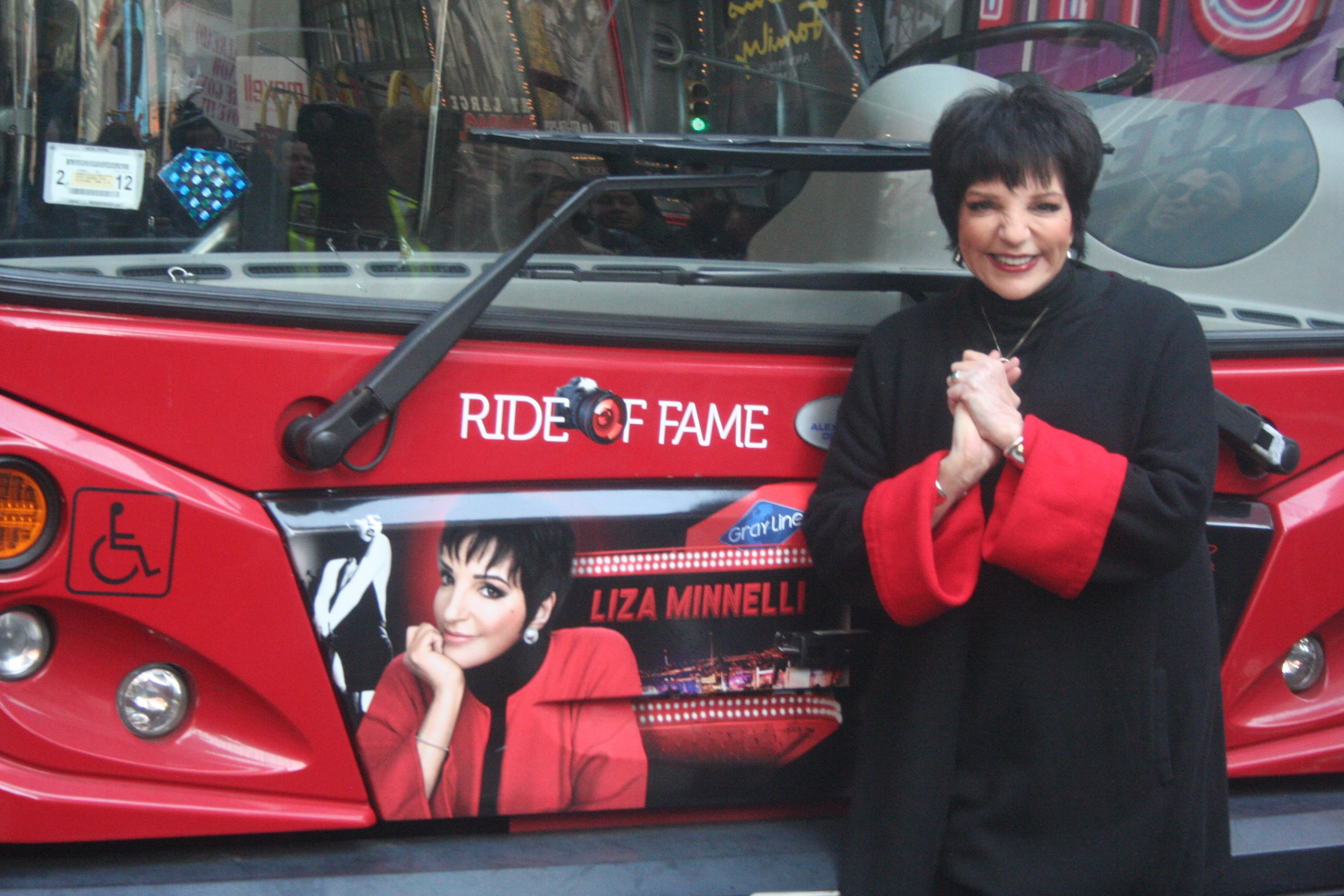
Minnelli honored by Gray Line New York's Ride of Fame campaign, 2011

Minnelli was a character in the Australian musical The Boy from Oz (a biography of her first husband, Peter Allen) starring Hugh Jackman. In the show's Broadway production, she was portrayed by Stephanie J. Block. In October 2009, Minnelli toured Australia and appeared on Australian Idol as a mentor and guest judge. Minnelli made a cameo appearance in the May 2010 release of Sex and the City 2, in which she covered Beyoncé's hit "Single Ladies (Put a Ring on It)" and Cole Porter's "Ev'ry Time We Say Goodbye". She made a starring appearance in December 2010 in The Apprentice.

Also in 2010, Minnelli released an album of a number of American standards "unplugged" with long-time collaborator Billy Stritch, showing a sultrier and softer, more interpretive side to her artistry. The songs are said to have been recorded several years prior and later released as the album Confessions.

On June 14, 2012, Minnelli headlined at Hampton Court Palace Festival. On May 9, 2014, Minnelli had a guest appearance on Cher's Dressed to Kill Tour in Brooklyn, performing "Girls Just Want to Have Fun" with Cyndi Lauper and Rosie O'Donnell.

Her memoir, Kids, Wait Till You Hear This!, was published in March 2026. On January 21, 2026, Minnelli released the single "Kids Wait Till You Hear This". The song, which utilizes AI technology, was created by ElevenLabs for an AI-assisted album. The criticism she received over the use of AI led to her releasing a statement, saying:

"What I will not allow [the song's producer] to do? Create, clone or copy my voice! On this dance track, "Kids Wait Till You Hear This" which is a tease for my book, we used AI arrangements. Not AI vocals. A few trolls didn't bother to read the truth, check with me or my partners. The shout outs are all mine! Go listen, enjoy, and shake your pretty buns to the music, as we glide down the runway to send my book into the world and your very own hot hands."

== Personal life ==
Minnelli is an Episcopalian.

=== Health issues ===
Minnelli has lived and performed with scoliosis since her youth. She has said that the condition influenced the development of her distinctive dance style, explaining: "I found out that because of the scoliosis, if I lean back one way it hurts. The only reason I do anything like I do is because it's the only way I can do it without hurting! Literally. It’s really funny. It is so weird … I've got two false hips, a wired-up knee, scoliosis, which I’ve always had, and three crushed disks, but I feel great. I dance every day."

Minnelli struggled with alcoholism and developed a dependence on prescription medication, which began after she was prescribed Valium following the death of her mother. Her recreational drug use was also documented by her friend, the Pop artist Andy Warhol. In a diary entry dated January 3, 1978, Warhol recalled a story that fashion designer Halston told him:

So when the doorbell rang the night before, it was Liza in a hat pulled down so nobody would recognize her, and she said to Halston, "Give me every drug you've got." So he gave her a bottle of coke, a few sticks of marijuana, a Valium, four Quaaludes, and they were all wrapped in a tiny box, and then a little figure in a white hat came up on the stoop and kissed Halston, and it was Marty Scorsese, he'd been hiding around the corner, and then he and Liza went off to have their affair on all the drugs.

Minnelli later confirmed her drug-fueled affair with Scorsese in her memoir Kids, Wait Till You Hear This!.

In July 1984, Minnelli left the Broadway musical The Rink to check into the Betty Ford Clinic in Rancho Mirage, California, for treatment of alcohol and drug addiction. After stating she had "a problem and I am going to deal with it," she was replaced in the show by Stockard Channing.

=== Friendships ===
Minnelli was a regular at Studio 54 in New York City, frequently socializing at the nightclub with Warhol, Halston and Bianca Jagger. In 1978, she remarked that "Studio 54 brought a glamor back to New York that we haven't seen since the 60's... It's made New York get dressed up again."

Minnelli shared a close friendship with Halston and wore his designs almost exclusively. In the 2010 documentary Ultrasuede: In Search of Halston, she said he "was my big brother. I loved him. I trusted him."

Through Halston, she befriended Warhol. In February 1978, Minnelli sat for Warhol at the Factory, where he took Polaroid photographs of her for her portrait. She amassed a collection of 22 works by Warhol, including portraits of her parents.

Minnelli's friendships have included the singer Adam Ant, whom she advised on what to wear when he was presented to Queen Elizabeth II after the 1981 Royal Variety Performance at which his band Adam and the Ants performed. Ant in turn namechecked Minnelli in the track "Crackpot History and the Right To Lie" on his 1982 solo album Friend or Foe.

=== Relationships ===
Minnelli has married and divorced four times. Her first marriage was to Australian entertainer Peter Allen on March 3, 1967. Allen had been her mother's protégé in the mid-1960s. During an Australian visit in 1964, Minnelli and Allen, who was then her boyfriend, were invited to the opening of the Compass Centre in Bankstown, Sydney. They were awarded the titles of King and Queen of the Compass Centre. After three years of marriage, Minnelli and Allen agreed to a trial separation on April 9, 1970. Their divorce was finalized on July 24, 1974. Minnelli told The Advocate editor-in-chief Judy Wieder in 1996, "I married Peter, and he didn't tell me he was gay. Everyone knew but me. And I found out … well, let me put it this way: I'll never surprise anybody coming home as long as I live. I call first!"

Minnelli was engaged to actor and musician Desi Arnaz Jr. from 1972 to 1973. She left Arnaz for actor and comedian Peter Sellers, who she was engaged to for one month in 1973. She also had relationships with Rock Brynner (son of Yul Brynner), Mikhail Baryshnikov, Billy Stritch, and film director Martin Scorsese. Her close friendship with French singer Charles Aznavour was described by Aznavour as "more than friends and less than lovers."

Minnelli married Jack Haley Jr., a producer and director, on September 15, 1974. His father, Jack Haley, was her mother's co-star in The Wizard of Oz as the Tin Man. They divorced in April 1979.

Minnelli married Mark Gero, a sculptor and stage manager, at Bartholomew's Episcopal Church in Manhattan on December 4, 1979. Minnelli wore a dress by Halston, who held the wedding reception at his home. Guests included Warhol, Elizabeth Taylor, Faye Dunaway, Martha Graham, and Steve Rubell. Minnelli charged Gero with abandonment in her November 1990 divorce filing, and the divorce was finalized in January 1992.

Minnelli was married to David Gest, a concert promoter, from March 16, 2002, until their separation in July 2003 and divorce in April 2007. Their wedding involved over 1,200 guests at the Marble Collegiate Church in Manhattan, with Michael Jackson as the best man, Elizabeth Taylor as the matron of honor, and a bridal party that included Mia Farrow, Gina Lollobrigida, Petula Clark, Mya, and Janet Leigh among others. Gest was reportedly gay, as was her first husband. In a 2003 lawsuit, Gest alleged that Minnelli beat him in alcohol-induced rages during their marriage. Minnelli denied the accusations, claiming Gest was simply after her money. The suit was dismissed in September 2006 for lack of triable issue of fact.

Minnelli has no children despite numerous attempts; one pregnancy left her with a hiatal hernia as a result of the medical steps taken to try to save the baby.

=== Philanthropy ===
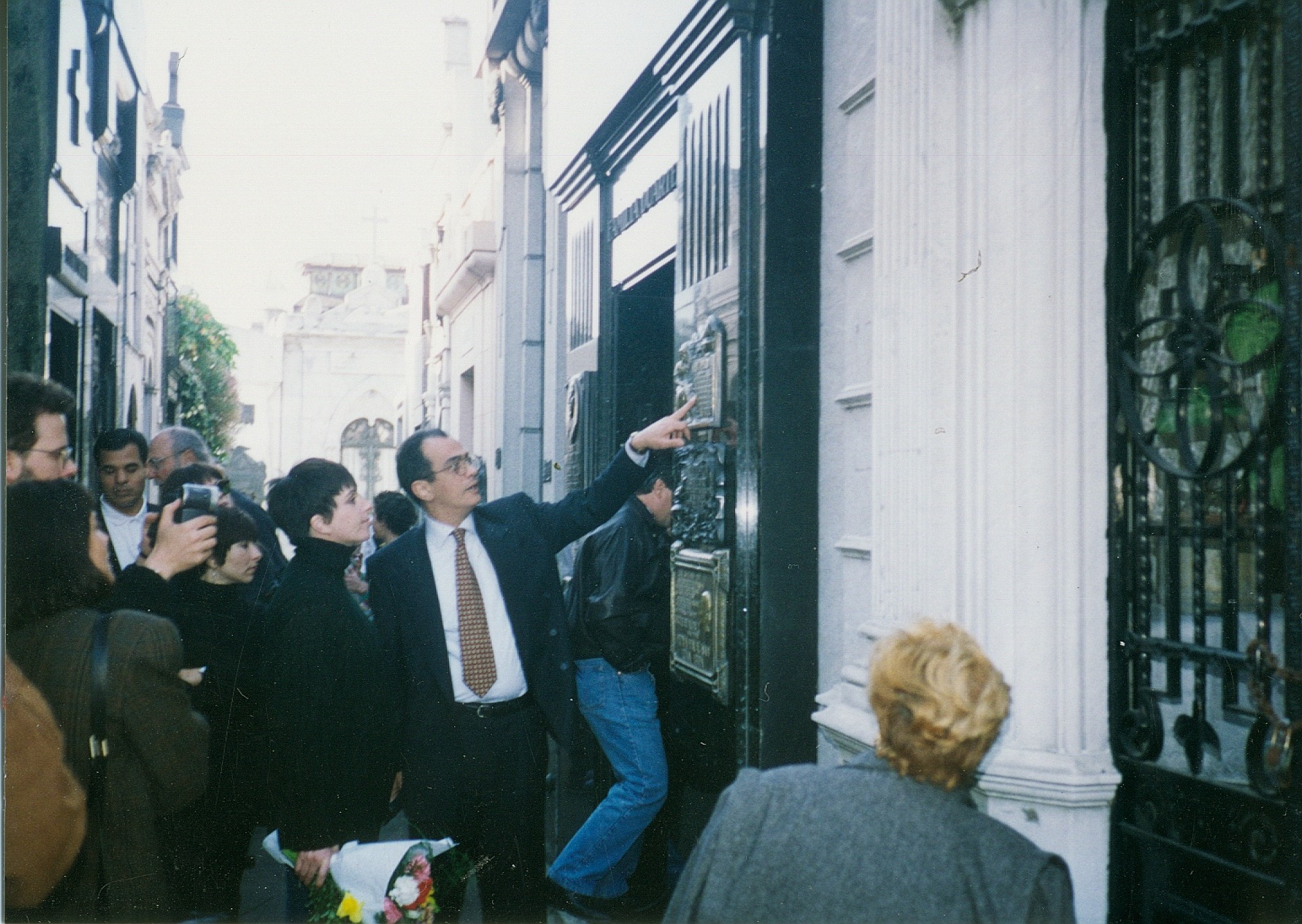
Minnelli visiting the tomb of Eva Perón in Buenos Aires in 1993. (In the early 1990s, she was in the running for the role of Evita.)

Throughout her lifetime, Minnelli has served on various charities and causes. She served on the board of directors of The Institutes for The Achievement of Human Potential (IAHP) for 20 years, a nonprofit educational organization that introduces parents to the field of child brain development. In a 2006 interview with Randy Rice at Broadwayworld.com, Minnelli said that she was the person who told Elizabeth Taylor about HIV/AIDS while talking about their mutual friend Rock Hudson. She has also dedicated much time to amfAR, The Foundation for AIDS Research, which was co-founded by Taylor.

In 2007, she stated in an interview with Palm Springs Life: "AmfAR is important to me because I've lost so many friends that I knew [to AIDS]". In 1994, she recorded the Kander & Ebb tune "The Day After That" and donated the proceeds to AIDS research. The same year, she performed the song in front of thousands in Central Park at the 25th anniversary of the Stonewall riots.

== Discography ==
Studio albums

- Liza! Liza! (1964)
- It Amazes Me (1965)
- There Is a Time (1966)
- Liza Minnelli (1968)
- Come Saturday Morning (1969)
- New Feelin' (1970)
- The Singer (1973)
- Tropical Nights (1977)
- Results (1989)
- Gently (1996)
- Confessions (2010)

== Credits ==
=== Film ===
Year	Title	Director	Role	Notes
1949	In the Good Old Summertime	Robert Z. Leonard	The Daughter	Uncredited role
1954	The Long, Long Trailer	Vincente Minnelli	Little Girl at Wedding	Scenes deleted
1968	Charlie Bubbles	Albert Finney	Eliza	
1969	The Sterile Cuckoo	Alan J. Pakula	Mary Ann "Pookie" Adams	Nominated - Academy Award for Best Actress
1970	Tell Me That You Love Me, Junie Moon	Otto Preminger	Junie Moon	
1972	Cabaret	Bob Fosse	Sally Bowles	Won - Academy Award for Best Actress
1972	Journey Back to Oz	Hal Sutherland	Dorothy Gale	Voice
1974	That's Entertainment!	Jack Haley Jr.	Host	
1975	Lucky Lady	Stanley Donen	Claire	
1976	Silent Movie	Mel Brooks	Herself	Cameo appearance
1976	A Matter of Time	Vincente Minnelli	Nina	
1977	New York, New York	Martin Scorsese	Francine Evans	
1981	Arthur	Steve Gordon	Linda Marolla	
1982	The King of Comedy	Martin Scorsese	Herself	Scenes deleted; appears as cardboard cutout
1984	The Muppets Take Manhattan	Frank Oz	Herself	Cameo appearance
1985	That's Dancing!	Jack Haley Jr.	Herself	
1988	Rent-a-Cop	Jerry London	Della Roberts	
1988	Arthur 2: On the Rocks	Bud Yorkin	Linda Marolla Bach	
1991	Stepping Out	Lewis Gilbert	Mavis Turner	
2006	The Oh in Ohio	Billy Kent	Alyssa Donahue	
2010	Sex and the City 2	Michael Patrick King	Herself	Cameo appearance
2019	Halston	Frédéric Tcheng	Herself	Cameo appearance
2024	Liza: A Truly Terrific Absolutely True Story	Bruce David Klein	Herself	Documentary

=== Television ===
Year	Title	Role	Notes
1956	Ford Star Jubilee	Herself	The first full-scale color telecast on CBS
1960	Hedda Hopper's Hollywood	Herself	Minnelli sings "Over the Rainbow"
1963	The Judy Garland Show	Herself	Episodes 3 and 15 ("The Judy Garland Christmas Special")
1964	Mr. Broadway	Minnie	Episode: "Nightingale for Sale"
1964	Judy and Liza at the Palladium	Herself	Television special with Judy Garland
1965	The Dangerous Christmas of Red Riding Hood	Herself	Television special
1967	Woody Allen Looks at 1967	Herself	Television special
1968	That's Life	Secretary	Episode: "Twas the Night Before Christmas"
1970	Liza	Herself	Television special
1972	Liza with a "Z"	Herself	Television special
1974	Love from A to Z	Herself	Television special with Charles Aznavour
1974	46th Academy Awards	Herself	Performed opening number
1979	The Muppet Show	Herself	Episode: "Liza Minnelli"
1980	Goldie and Liza Together	Herself	Television special with Goldie Hawn
1980	An Evening with Liza Minnelli	Herself	Television special
1984	Faerie Tale Theatre	Princess Alecia	Episode: "The Princess and the Pea"
1985	A Time to Live	Mary-Lou Weisman	Television movie
1986	Liza in London	Herself	Television special
1987	Minnelli on Minnelli: Liza Remembers Vincente	Herself	Documentary
1988	Sam Found Out: A Triple Play	Herself	Television special
1989	Frank, Liza & Sammy: The Ultimate Event	Herself	Television special with Frank Sinatra and Sammy Davis Jr.
1992	The Freddie Mercury Tribute Concert	Herself	Television special
1992	Liza Live from Radio City Music Hall	Herself	Television special
1993	Liza and Friends: A Tribute to Sammy Davis Jr.	Herself	Television special
1994	Parallel Lives	Stevie Merrill	Television movie
1995	The West Side Waltz	Cara Varnum	Television movie
1999	Jackie's Back	Herself	Cameo; Television film
2003–05; 2013	Arrested Development	Lucille Austero	21 episodes
2006	Law & Order: Criminal Intent	Beth Harner	Episode: "Masquerade"
2009	Drop Dead Diva	Lily Wells	Episode: "Make Me a Match"
2009, 2010	Kathy Griffin: My Life on the D-List	Herself	2 Episodes, "I Heart Lily Tomlin" and "Kathy With a Z"
2013	Smash	Herself	Episode: "The Surprise Party"
2022	94th Academy Awards	Herself – Co-Presenter	Presented Best Picture with Lady Gaga
2025	RuPaul's Drag Race	Herself	Episode: "Grand Finale"

=== Theater ===
Year	Title	Role	Venue
1961	Wish You Were Here	Ballet solo	Cape Cod Melody Tent, Massachusetts
1961	Take Me Along	Muriel	Cape Cod Melody Tent, Massachusetts
1961	Flower Drum Song	Chorus	Cape Cod Melody Tent, Massachusetts
1961–62	The Diary of Anne Frank	Anne Frank	Scarsdale High School, Scarsdale; New York and Israel Tour
1963	Best Foot Forward	Ethel Hofflinger	Stage 73, Off-Broadway
1964	Carnival!	Lili	Paper Mill Playhouse, New Jersey
1964	Time Out For Ginger	Ginger	Bucks County Playhouse, Pennsylvania
1964	The Fantasticks	Luisa	U.S. National Tour
1965	Flora the Red Menace	Flora	Alvin Theatre, Broadway
1966	The Pajama Game	Babe Williams	U.S. National Tour
1974	Liza	Herself (one-woman show)	Winter Garden Theatre, Broadway
1975	Chicago	Roxie Hart	46th Street Theatre, Broadway; Note: replacement for Gwen Verdon
1977–78	The Act	Michelle Craig	Majestic Theatre, Broadway
1978	Are You Now or Have You Ever Been?	Letter Reader (cameo)	Promenade Theatre, Off-Broadway
1978–79	The Owl and the Pussycat	The Storyteller	Metropolitan Opera House, New York City
1984	The Rink	Angel	Martin Beck Theatre, Broadway
1994	Love Letters	Melissa Gardner	Coconut Grove Playhouse, Florida
1997	Victor/Victoria	Victoria Grant	Marquis Theatre, Broadway; Note: vacation replacement for Julie Andrews
1999–2000	Minnelli on Minnelli: Live at the Palace	Herself (one-woman show)	Palace Theatre, Broadway
2008–09	Liza's at The Palace....	Herself (one-woman show)	Palace Theatre, Broadway
2013	Liza & Alan	Herself	Town Hall, Broadway

== Awards and nominations ==
In 1991, for her contribution to live performance, Minnelli was awarded a star on the Hollywood Walk of Fame at 7000 Hollywood Boulevard. She was made a Knight of the French Legion of Honour. She also received an Academy Award, a BAFTA Award, a Primetime Emmy Award, two Golden Globe Awards, a Grammy Award, and three Tony Awards.

Year	Award	Category	Nominated work	Result	Ref.
1969	Academy Awards	Best Actress	The Sterile Cuckoo	Nominated	
1972	Academy Awards	Best Actress	Cabaret	Won	
1973	Primetime Emmy Awards	Outstanding Achievement by a Supporting Performer in Music or Variety	A Royal Gala Variety Performance	Nominated	
1973	Primetime Emmy Awards	Outstanding Single Program - Variety and Popular Music	Liza with a Z	Won	
1980	Primetime Emmy Awards	Outstanding Variety or Music Program	Goldie and Liza Together	Nominated	
1987	Primetime Emmy Awards	Outstanding Informational Special	Minnelli on Minnelli: Liza Remembers Vincente	Nominated	
1993	Primetime Emmy Awards	Outstanding Individual Performance in a Variety or Music Program	Liza Minnelli: Live from Radio City Music Hall	Nominated	
1965	Tony Awards	Best Actress in a Musical	Flora the Red Menace	Won	
1974	Tony Awards	Special Tony Award	Liza at the Winter Garden	Honored	
1978	Tony Awards	Best Actress in a Musical	The Act	Won	
1984	Tony Awards	Best Actress in a Musical	The Rink	Nominated	
2009	Tony Awards	Best Special Theatrical Event	Liza's at The Palace...	Won	
1989	Razzie Awards	Worst Actress	Arthur 2: On the Rocks	Won	
1990	Grammy Awards	Grammy Legend Award	Liza Minnelli	Honored	
1997	Grammy Awards	Best Traditional Pop Vocal Performance	Gently	Nominated	
2010	Grammy Awards	Best Traditional Pop Vocal Album	Liza's at The Palace...!	Nominated	

== See also ==
- List of persons who have won Academy, Emmy, Grammy, and Tony Awards
