= List of awards and nominations received by Liza Minnelli =

Liza Minnelli awards and nominations
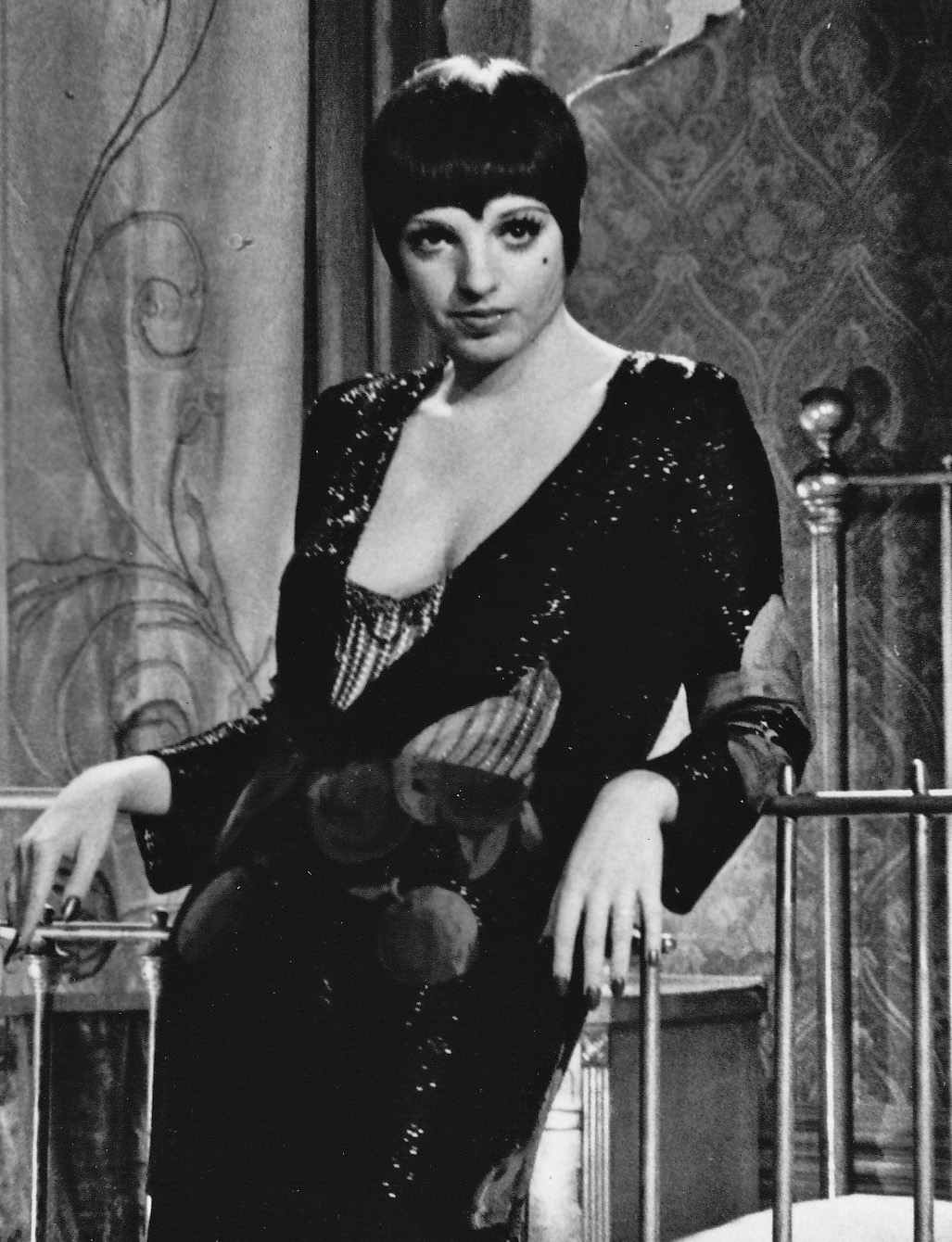
Awards and nominations
| Award | Wins | Nominations |
| Academy Awards | 1 | 2 |
| BAFTA Awards | 1 | 2 |
| Emmy Awards | 1 | 2 |
| Golden Globes | 2 | 6 |
| Grammy Awards | 2 | 4 |
| SAG Awards | 0 | 1 |
| Tony Awards | 3 | 4 |

Totals (Note: Certain award groups do not simply award one winner. They acknowledge several different recipients, have runners-up, and have third place. Since this is a specific recognition and is different from losing an award, runner-up mentions are considered wins in this award tally. For simplification and to avoid errors, each award in this list has been presumed to have had a prior nomination.)
- Wins: 25
- Nominations: 20

Liza Minnelli is an American actress and singer known her work in film, television, and theatre. Over her career she has received numerous accolades including an Academy Award, a BAFTA Award, a Primetime Emmy Award, two Golden Globe Awards, a Grammy Award, and three Tony Awards. She is one of the few performers to have received the EGOT (Emmy, Grammy, Oscar, and Tony). She has been honored with the Hollywood Walk of Fame in 1990, the Grammy Living Legend Award in 1990, and the French Legion of Honor in 1987.

She won the Academy Award for Best Actress for her portrayal of Sally Bowles in the Bob Fosse directed musical film Cabaret (1972). She was previously Oscar-nominated for her role as the quirky love interest in the comedy-drama The Sterile Cuckoo (1969). Her role in Cabaret also earned her the BAFTA Award for Best Actress and the Golden Globe Award for Best Actress in a Motion Picture – Musical or Comedy. She was Globe-nominated for her performances in The Sterile Cuckoo (1969), Lucky Lady (1975), New York, New York (1977), and Arthur (1981).

She won the Primetime Emmy Award for Outstanding Variety Special for her concert film Liza with a Z (1972). She was Emmy-nominated for the CBS musical special Goldie and Liza Together with Goldie Hawn. She won the Golden Globe Award for Best Actress – Miniseries or Television Film for playing a mother of a child with muscular dystrophy in the NBC television film A Time to Live (1985). She was nominated for the Screen Actors Guild Award for Outstanding Performance by an Ensemble in a Comedy Series for the Netflix revival of Arrested Development (2013).

On stage, she won two Tony Awards for Best Actress in a Musical for playing the title role in the Broadway musical Flora the Red Menace (1965) and a fading film star attempting a comeback in the Broadway musical The Act (1978). She was also Tony-nominated for her performance in the musical The Rink (1984). She won the Special Tony Award for her concert show Liza at the Winter Garden (1974) and the Tony Award for Best Special Theatrical Event for another concert show Liza's at The Palace...! (2009). She also won a Drama Desk Award and a Theatre World Award.

== Major associations ==
=== Academy Awards ===
| Year | Category | Nominated work | Result | Ref. |
|---|---|---|---|---|
| 1969 | Best Actress | The Sterile Cuckoo | Nominated | |
| 1972 | Best Actress | Cabaret | Won | |

=== BAFTA Awards ===
| Year | Category | Nominated work | Result | Ref. |
British Academy Film Awards
| 1970 | Most Promising Newcomer to Leading Film Roles | The Sterile Cuckoo | Nominated | |
| 1972 | Best Actress in a Leading Role | Cabaret | Won | |

=== Emmy Awards ===
| Year | Category | Nominated work | Result | Ref. |
Primetime Emmy Awards
| 1973 | Outstanding Single Program – Variety and Popular Music | Liza with a Z | Won | |
| 1980 | Outstanding Variety or Music Program | Goldie and Liza Together | Nominated | |

=== Golden Globe Awards ===
| Year | Category | Nominated work | Result | Ref. |
|---|---|---|---|---|
| 1969 | Best Actress – Motion Picture Drama | The Sterile Cuckoo | Nominated | |
| 1972 | Best Actress – Motion Picture Musical or Comedy | Cabaret | Won | |
| 1975 | Best Actress – Motion Picture Musical or Comedy | Lucky Lady | Nominated | |
| 1977 | Best Actress – Motion Picture Musical or Comedy | New York, New York | Nominated | |
| 1981 | Best Actress – Motion Picture Musical or Comedy | Arthur | Nominated | |
| 1985 | Best Actress – Miniseries or Television Movie | A Time to Live | Won | |

=== Grammy Awards ===
| Year | Category | Nominated work | Result | Ref. |
|---|---|---|---|---|
| 1990 | Grammy Living Legend Award | Contributions and Influence in the Recording Field | Honored | |
| 1997 | Best Traditional Pop Vocal Performance | Gently | Nominated | |
| 2008 | Grammy Hall of Fame Award | Inductee | Honored | |
| 2010 | Best Traditional Pop Vocal Album | Liza's at The Palace...! | Nominated | |

=== Screen Actors Guild Awards ===
| Year | Category | Nominated work | Result | Ref. |
|---|---|---|---|---|
| 2013 | Outstanding Ensemble in a Comedy Series | Arrested Development | Nominated | |

=== Tony Awards ===
| Year | Category | Nominated work | Result | Ref. |
|---|---|---|---|---|
| 1965 | Best Leading Actress in a Musical | Flora the Red Menace | Won | |
| 1974 | Special Tony Award | Liza at the Winter Garden | Honored | |
| 1978 | Best Leading Actress in a Musical | The Act | Won | |
| 1984 | Best Leading Actress in a Musical | The Rink | Nominated | |
| 2009 | Best Special Theatrical Event | Liza's at The Palace...! | Won | |

== Other awards ==
| Organizations | Year | Category | Work | Result | Ref. |
|---|---|---|---|---|---|
| David di Donatello | 1970 | Best Foreign Actress | Pookie | Won | |
| David di Donatello | 1973 | Best Actress | Cabaret | Honored | |
| David di Donatello | 2002 | David Special Award | Herself | Won | |
| Drama Desk Awards | 1984 | Outstanding Actress in a Musical | The Rink | Nominated | |
| Drama Desk Awards | 2009 | Drama Desk Special Award | Liza's at The Palace...! | Honored | |
| Theatre World Awards | 1963 | Distinguished Performance | Best Foot Forward | Won | |

== Miscellaneous honors ==
Golden Raspberry Awards

- 1988: Worst Actress Winner for Rent-a-Cop and Arthur 2: On the Rocks combined.

== Honorary awards ==
| Organization | Year | Award | Result | Ref. |
|---|---|---|---|---|
| Hasty Pudding Theatricals | 1973 | Hasty Pudding Woman of the Year | Honored | |
| Hollywood Walk of Fame | 1991 | Motion Picture Star at 7000 Hollywood Boulevard | Honored | |
| PFLAG | 2010 | Award | Honored | |
| Straight for Equality in Entertainment Award | 2010 | For "her lifelong support of lesbian, gay, bisexual, and transgender (LGBT) people." | Honored | |
| GLAAD Awards | 2005 | For "her contributions to increased visibility and understanding of the (LGBT) community" | Honored | |
| Mercy College (New York) | 2007 | Honorary Doctorate, "for her charitable activities and entertainment career" | Honored | |
| Ride of Fame | 2011 | Dedicated a double decker tour bus to her life's work in New York City | Honored | |
| Silver Clef Award | 2011 | Icon Award | Honored | |
| Stamford Center for the Arts/Palace Theatre | 2012 | Arts Legacy Award | Honored | |
| Fred and Adele Astaire Awards | 2012 | Douglas Watt Lifetime Achievement Award | Honored | |
| RuPaul's Drag Race | 2025 | Giving Us Lifetime Achievement Award | Honored | |
