= Woody Allen Looks at 1967 =

1967 US television special

- Genre: Stand-up comedy Variety special
- Written by: Woody Allen; Marshall Brickman; Mickey Rose
- Directed by: Dwight Hemion
- Starring: Woody Allen; Liza Minnelli; Aretha Franklin; William F. Buckley
- Country of origin: United States
- Original language: English

Production
- Executive producer: Gary Smith
- Producers: Dwight Hemion; Lee Miller
- Editor: Jack Shultis
- Running time: 52 minutes

Original release
- Network: NBC
- Release: December 27, 1967

Woody Allen Looks at 1967 is a television special that premiered on NBC on December 27, 1967, starring stand-up comedian Woody Allen. Allen hosted the show produced by Kraft Music Hall, in which he opens with a standup monologue and acts in a series of comedy skits alongside Liza Minnelli. He also has a conversation with guest and public intellectual and noted conservative William F. Buckley Jr. as they talk about the year 1967 and make jokes at each other's expense. Aretha Franklin serves as the musical guest.

== Cast ==
- Woody Allen as host
- Liza Minnelli as various roles/musical guest
- Aretha Franklin as musical guest
- William F. Buckley as guest
- John Byner as various roles

== Summary ==
The special starts with a monologue from Allen followed by a satirical skit featuring Allen and Minnelli as a husband and wife clashing over the latest fashion, mini skirts. This is followed by another comedy skit. Allen then interviews the special guest William F. Buckley, Jr and they discuss the current issues including the Middle East, discothèques, fashion, politics, religion, and the possibility that Sen. Robert F. Kennedy might run for president. The audience does take part in a Q and A portion with Allen and Buckley.

Musical highlights include Franklin singing "R-E-S-P-E-C-T" and "Chain of Fools" with Minnelli performing a special rendition of "The 59th Street Bridge Song (Feelin Groovy)" and "Up, Up and Away". The program concludes with a spoof of what Allen stated was the best film of 1967 Bonnie and Clyde, entitled "Bonnie's Clyde," with Allen as Clyde and Minnelli as Bonnie.

== Production ==
This television special served as one of many in a series of variety programs produced by "The Kraft Music Hall". The name came from a variety program which was hosted by comedian Milton Berle and was sponsored by Kraft Foods which aired on NBC from 1958 to 1959. From 1959 to 1963 Kraft continued to sponsor musical variety programs under a variety of titles hosted by various celebrities including Perry Como. "The Kraft Music Hall" returned from 1967 to 1971 hosted by a different celebrity guest each week including Groucho Marx, George Burns, Joan Rivers, Jack Benny, Phyllis Diller, Mitzi Gaynor, Steve Allen, Dick Cavett, and Tony Randall. Various musical guests included Louis Armstrong, Simon & Garfunkel, Ray Charles, Sonny & Cher, Dionne Warwick, and Liberace.

== Reception ==
In 2012, Ramsey Ess from Vulture re-examined the special in a piece entitled, "Looking at Woody Allen Looks at 1967". Ess praised Allen's capabilities as "a fun interview, and there’s no arguing that as a stand-up he’s fantastic", but critiqued his performances in the comedy skits. Ess noted "In 1967, we see that Woody was significantly greener, and perhaps a little more unfamiliar to home audiences", mentioning his standup appearances on The Ed Sullivan Show and his uncredited cameo role in James Bond parody by Peter Sellers, Casino Royale (1967), adding "At the end of ‘67, Woody was on his way, but he wasn’t a household name yet." Ess praised the musical performances of Franklin and Minnelli and praised the interview between Allen and Buckley writing, "Despite their very different opinions, the pair gets along and both come off well in the interview".
