= Michael Jackson: The Life of an Icon =

2011 film

- DVD cover
- Directed by: Andrew Eastel
- Produced by: David Gest; Denise Berry
- Starring: David Gest; Katherine Jackson; Tito Jackson; Rebbie Jackson
- Edited by: Paul Holland
- Production company: David Gest Productions
- Distributed by: Universal Pictures
- Release date: November 2, 2011
- Running time: 150 minutes
- Country: United States
- Language: English

Michael Jackson: The Life of an Icon is a documentary film about pop singer Michael Jackson produced by his friend David Gest. The film features footage of the beginning of The Jackson 5, Jackson's solo career and the child molestation accusations made against him. It also has interviews with Jackson's mother, Katherine, and siblings, Tito and Rebbie Jackson, as well as other artists—who were inspired by him and had met him before his death—including Whitney Houston, Smokey Robinson and Dionne Warwick. The film was released on DVD and Blu-ray on November 2, 2011.

Professional ratings
Review scores
Source	Rating
IMDb	3.5/5 stars

== Cast ==
- Michael Jackson (archive footage)
- Katherine Jackson
- Tito Jackson
- Rebbie Jackson
- David Gest
- Quincy Jones
- Dionne Warwick
- Whitney Houston
- Thomas Mesereau
- Frank Cascio
- Percy Sledge
- Petula Clark
- Paul Anka
- Dennis Edwards
- Jimmy Ruffin
- Freda Payne
- Brian Holland
- Lamont Dozier
- Eddie Holland
- Martha Reeves
- Nick Ashford
- Valerie Simpson
- Abdul Fakir
- Ron Alexenberg
- Peabo Bryson
- Eddie Floyd
- Marilyn McCoo
- Billy Davis, Jr.
- Kim Weston
- Brenda Holloway
- Don Black
- Ronnie Rancifer
- Bobby Taylor
- Keith Jackson
- Ronald Jackson
- Reynaud Jones
- Frank DiLeo
- J. Randy Taraborrelli
- Milford Hite
- Robert Hite
- Dexter Wansel
- Russell Thompkins, Jr.
- Mickey Rooney
- Weldon A. McDougal III
- Mark Lester
- Kenny Gamble
- Leon Huff
- Billy Paul
