= Semi-basement =

Floor of a building that is half below ground

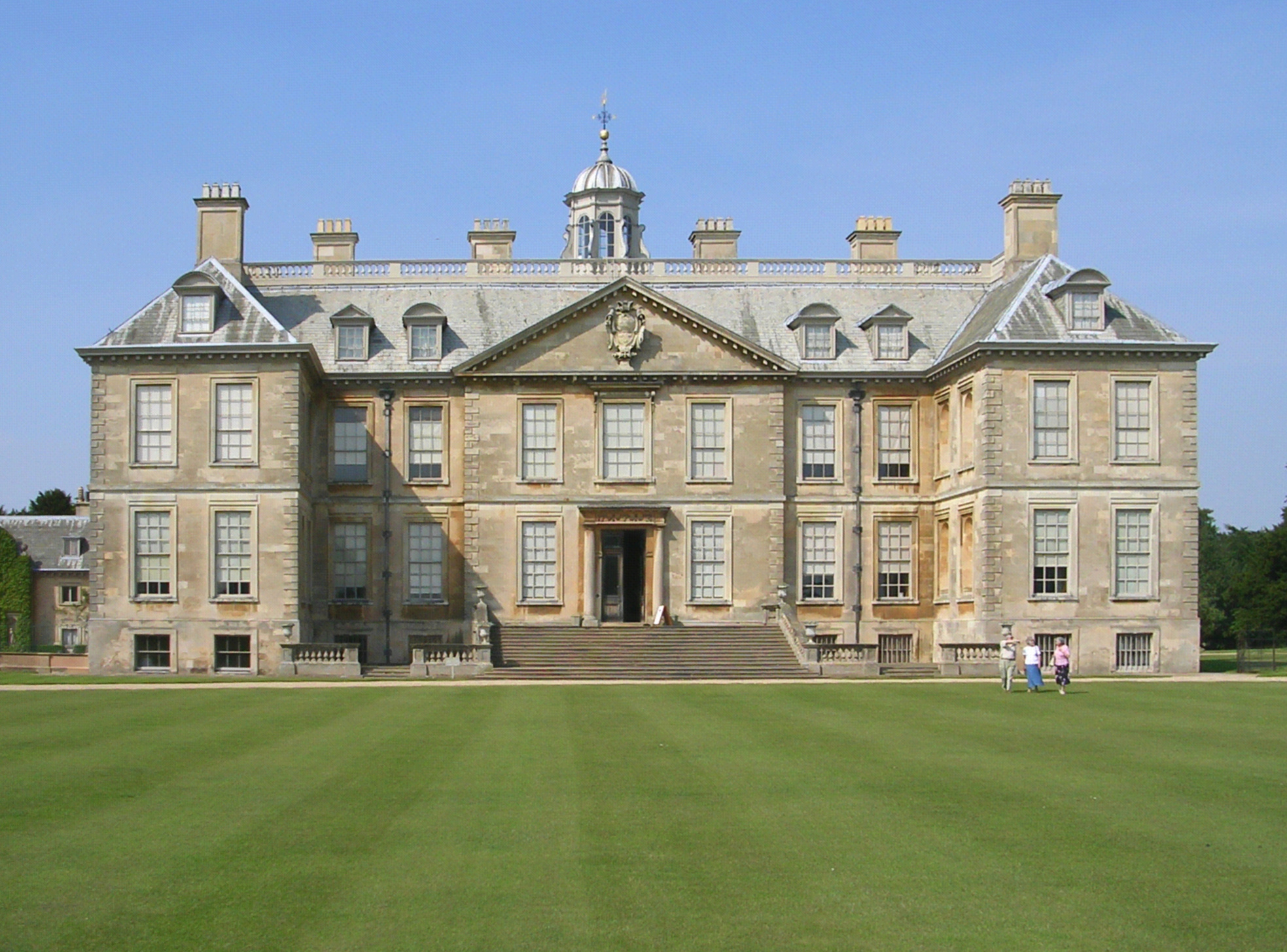
Belton House. Externally the windows of the servant's semi-basement are visible at ground level. Internally they are too close to the ceiling to have a view.

In architecture, a semi-basement, lower ground, lower level, etc. is a floor of a building that is half below ground, rather than entirely such as a true basement or cellar.

Traditionally, semi-basements were designed in larger houses where staff was housed. A semi-basement usually contained kitchens and domestic offices. The advantage over a basement is that a semi-basement can let outside light in as it can have windows, albeit ones that are often too high to enjoy a view. Historically this was an advantage as the servants, who traditionally inhabited such a floor, would not have the opportunity to waste time by looking out of the window.

The feature also has the aesthetic value of raising the ground floor, containing the building's reception rooms higher from the ground in order that they could enjoy better views, and be more free from the damp problems which always arose before the days of modern technology.

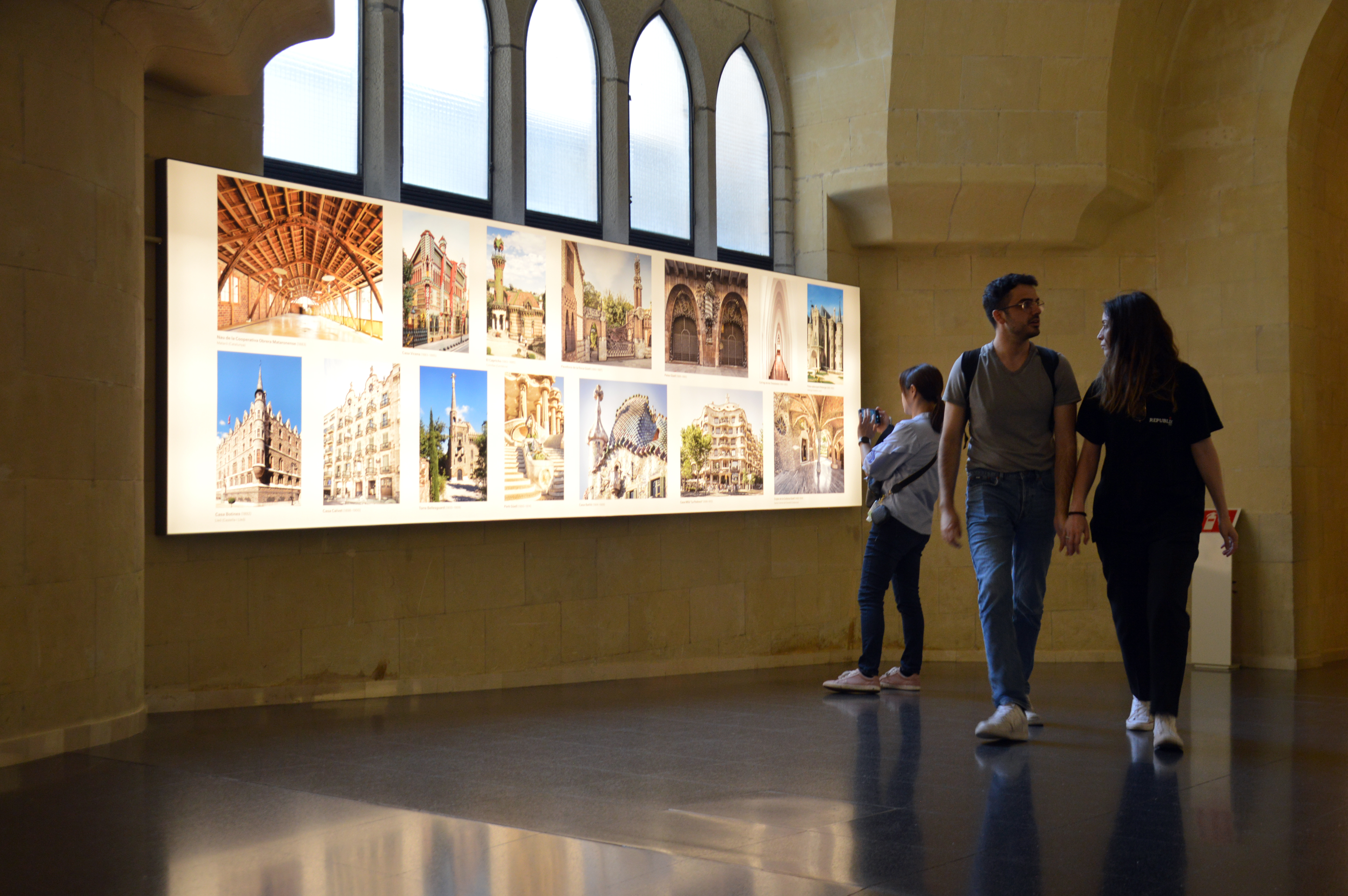
Lower floor with exhibition in Sagrada Família

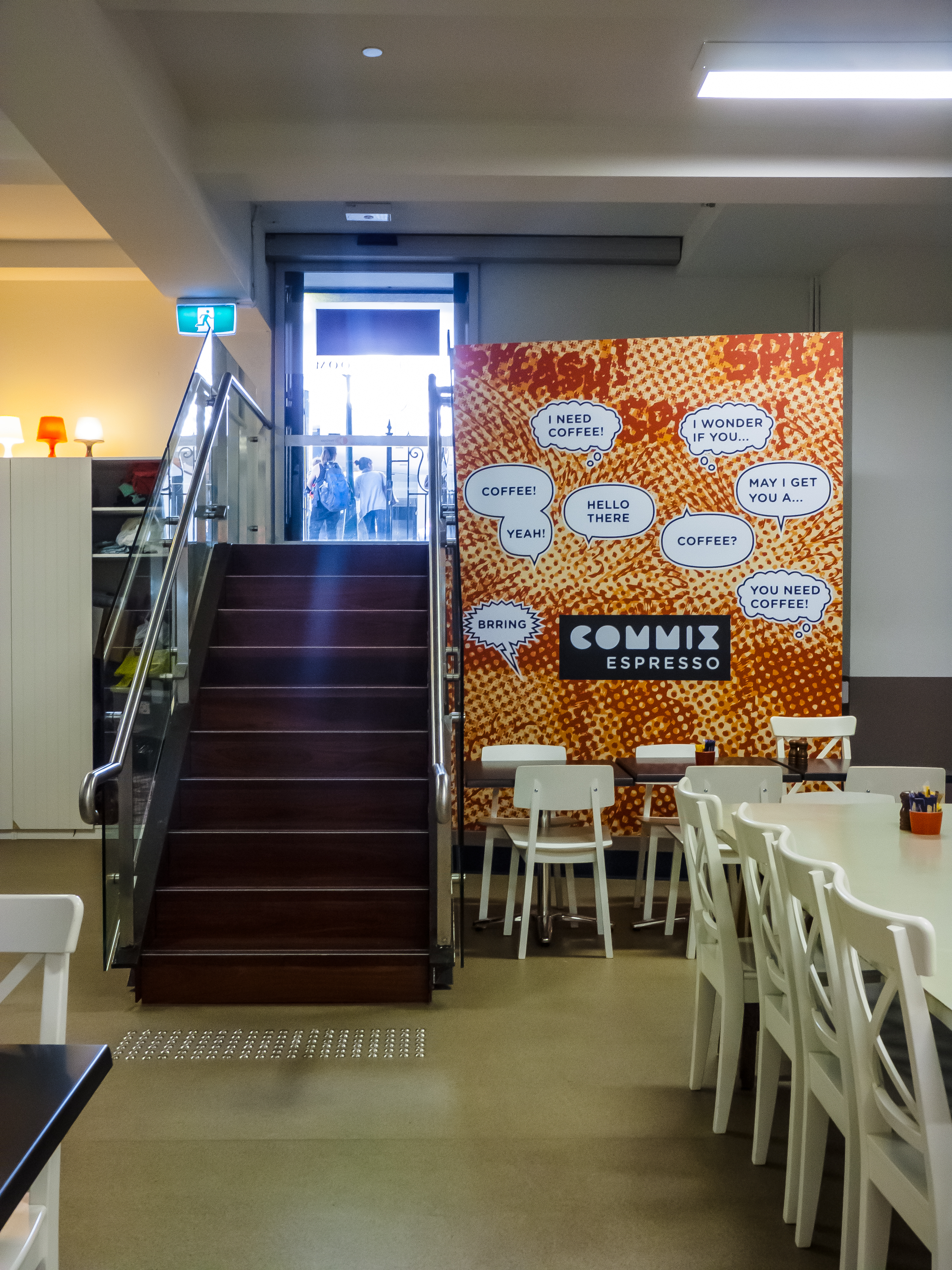
Lower ground floor with cafe in Brisbane

== See also ==
- English basement
