= Kids, Wait Till You Hear This! =

2026 memoir by Liza Minnelli

- Author: Liza Minnelli
- Language: English
- Genre: Autobiography
- Publisher: Grand Central Publishing (US)/Hodder & Stoughton (UK)
- Publication date: March 10, 2026
- Publication place: United States
- ISBN: 9781538773666
- OCLC: 1518265628

Kids, Wait Till You Hear This! is a 2026 memoir by Liza Minnelli. It was written with journalists Josh Getlin and Heidi Evans, and is based on conversations that Minnelli had with Michael Feinstein.

It was announced in August 2024 that Minnelli was to release her memoir in March 2026. It was published by Grand Central Publishing in the United States and Hodder & Stoughton in the United Kingdom.

== Content ==
The book recounts Minnelli's childhood as the daughter of Judy Garland and Vincente Minnelli and her career in Hollywood and as a musical performer. Minnelli describes her four marriages and her struggles with substance abuse. Minnelli recalls presenting the Academy Award for Best Picture at the 94th Academy Awards with Lady Gaga during which she was forced to be seated in a wheelchair instead of the planned director's chair. Minnelli said this left her unable to read the autocue and wrote "How would you feel if you were wheeled out, against your will, to perform in front of a live audience, and unable to see clearly? ... When I stumbled over a few words, Gaga, who was at my side, didn’t miss a beat to play the kind-hearted hero for all the world to see". Minnelli also recalls being passed out drunk on Lexington Avenue in New York City in October 2003 with "hundreds of people [who] stepped over or around my body ... What must they have thought?". Minnelli subsequently became sober and wrote that "The bottom line is that we're not a lost cause ... We can get better. I'm living proof of that".

== Reception ==
Reviewing the book in The Guardian, Fiona Sturges wrote that the prose was "surprisingly cohesive and spry" in spite of Minnelli's many literary collaborators and that it captures her voice "which combines showbiz luvviness with winning vitality and charm" and that it is elevated above other celebrity memoirs by her "vulnerability and brutal candour" in recounting her marriages, stories of substance abuse and her relationship with her mother, Judy Garland. In The Daily Telegraph, Helen Brown praised the book as "a funny and generous memoir" and that it was "good to tell the truth about your life, no matter how messy" and that this was the balance Minnelli found "with this gossipy, high-kicking hoofer of a book".

It received a critical review by Alexandra Jacobs in The New York Times. Jacobs felt the memoir was more "compact and circumspect" than Barbra Streisand's My Name Is Barbra and Cher's Cher: The Memoir having been "plucked, buffed and powder-puffed within an inch of its long life" by Feinstein during the 12-year writing process.
