= Nik Kershaw discography =

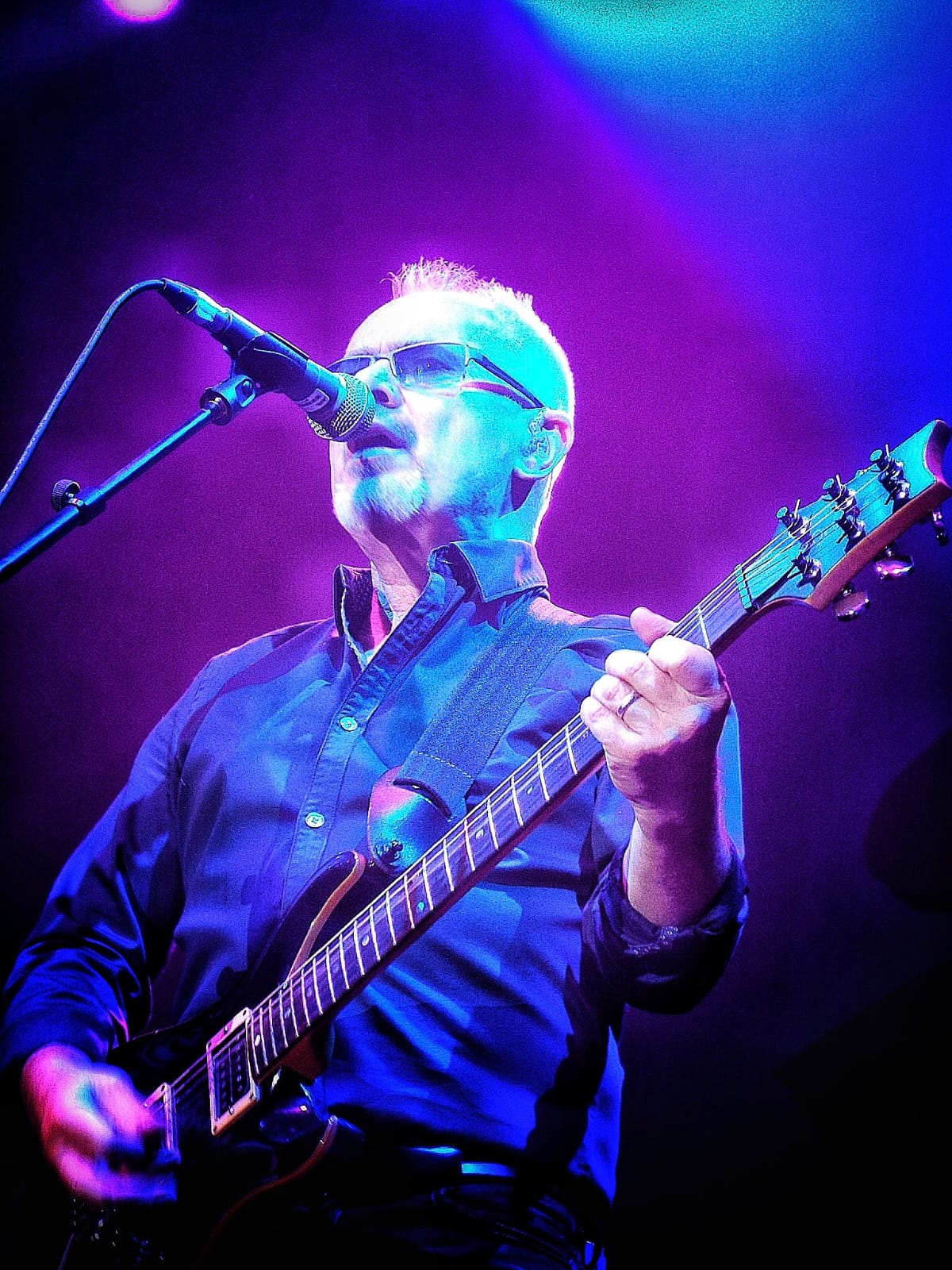
- Kershaw performing in 2019
- Studio albums: 9
- Live albums: 3
- Compilation albums: 9
- Singles: 27

The discography of the English musician Nik Kershaw consists of nine studio albums, three live albums, nine compilation albums, one extended play (EP) and 27 singles. His 62 weeks on the UK singles chart between 1984 and 1985 beat all other solo artists.

== Albums ==
=== Studio albums ===
Title	Album details	Peak chart positions										Certification
Title	Album details	UK	AUS	FIN	GER	NLD	NOR	SWE	SWI	US	NZ	Certification
Human Racing	Released: 27 February 1984; Label: MCA Records	5	35	8	8	13	7	38	12	70	32	BPI: Platinum
The Riddle	Released: 19 November 1984; Label: MCA Records	8	39	11	12	21	5	11	23	113	8	BPI: Platinum
Radio Musicola	Released: 20 October 1986; Label: MCA Records	47	92	—	—	—	—	—	—	—	—	BPI: Silver
The Works	Released: 22 May 1989; Label: MCA Records	—	—	—	—	—	—	—	—	—	—	
15 Minutes	Released: 6 April 1999; Label: Rhino Entertainment and Eagle Records	194	—	—	—	—	—	—	—	—	—	
To Be Frank	Released: 23 April 2001; Label: Koch Records and Eagle Records	—	—	—	—	—	—	—	—	—	—	
You've Got to Laugh	Released: 26 October 2006; Label: Shorthouse Records	—	—	—	—	—	—	—	—	—	—	
Ei8ht	Released: 6 August 2012; Label: Shorthouse Records	91	—	—	—	—	—	—	—	—	—	
Oxymoron	Released: 16 October 2020; Label: Audio Network	—	—	—	—	—	—	—	—	—	—	

=== Live albums ===
Title	Album details
BBC Transcription Services – Live in Concert	Released: 12 May 1987; Label: Promo
No Frills	Released: 8 April 2010; Label: Koch Records and Shorthouse Records
Live in Germany 1984	Released: 7 March 2011; Label: ZYX Music

=== Compilation albums ===
Title	Album details	Peak chart positions				
Title	Album details	UK	DEN	FIN	GER	SWE
The Collection	Released: 25 November 1991; Label: MCA Records	—	—	—	—	—
The Best of Nik Kershaw	Released: 7 June 1993; Label: Music Club International	—	—	—	—	—
Anthology	Released: 22 December 1995; Label: MCA Records	—	—	—	—	—
Greatest Hits	Released: March 1998; Label: Universal	—	9	12	—	23
The Essential	Released; 11 July 2000; Label: Spectrum Music	—	—	—	—	—
Then and Now	Released: 12 February 2005; Label: Universal Music TV	182	—	—	—	—
Human Racing – Special Edition	Released: 27 February 2012; Label: Universal Music TV	159	—	—	—	—
The Riddle – Special Edition	Released: 12 August 2013; Label: Universal Music TV	129	—	—	—	—
Essential Nik Kershaw	Released: 14 January 2022; Label: Spectrum	—	—	—	—	—
Collected	Released: 24 February 2023; Label: Universal Music	—	—	—	62	—

=== Remix albums ===
- '98 Remixes (1998)

=== Extended Plays ===
Title	Album details
Songs From The Shelf	Released: 6 May 2022; Digital release; 6 Tracks
Songs From The Shelf Part 2	Released: 14 April 2023; Digital release; 6 Tracks

== Singles ==
Year	Title	Peak chart positions											Album
Year	Title	UK	AUS	CAN	FIN	GER	IRE	NLD	NOR	SWI	US	NZ	Album
1983	"I Won't Let the Sun Go Down on Me"	47	—	—	—	—	—	—	8	6	—	—	Human Racing
1984	"Wouldn't It Be Good"	4	5	9	—	2	2	24	6	3	46	16	Human Racing
1984	"Dancing Girls"	13	—	—	—	21	14	—	—	—	—	—	Human Racing
1984	"I Won't Let the Sun Go Down on Me" (re-issue)	2	17	94	26	12	4	6	8	6	—	—	Human Racing
1984	"Human Racing"	19	—	—	—	—	17	—	—	—	—	—	Human Racing
1984	"The Riddle"	3	6	49	12	8	3	19	5	15	107 (Note: "The Riddle" did not enter the US Billboard Hot 100 but did peak at number seven on the Bubbling Under Hot 100 extension chart.)	6	The Riddle
1985	"Wide Boy"	9	7	—	—	25	5	47	—	—	—	21	The Riddle
1985	"Don Quixote"	10	83	—	—	39	9	—	—	—	—	36	The Riddle
1985	"When a Heart Beats"	27	92	—	21	55	14	—	—	—	—	—	Radio Musicola
1986	"Nobody Knows"	44	73	—	—	—	20	—	—	—	—	—	Radio Musicola
1986	"Radio Musicola"	43	—	—	—	—	—	—	—	—	—	—	Radio Musicola
1987	"James Cagney"	—	—	—	—	—	—	—	—	—	—	—	Radio Musicola
1989	"One Step Ahead"	55	—	—	—	—	—	—	—	—	—	—	The Works
1989	"Elisabeth's Eyes"	105	—	—	—	—	—	—	—	—	—	—	The Works
1991	"I Wanna Change the Score" (Tony Banks & Nik Kershaw)	76	—	—	—	55	—	—	—	—	—	—	Still
1991	"Wouldn't It Be Good" (re-issue)	89	—	—	—	—	—	—	—	—	—	—	The Collection
1998	"Wouldn't It Be Good '98"	—	—	—	—	—	—	—	—	—	—	—	Greatest Hits
1999	"Somebody Loves You"	70	—	—	—	—	—	—	—	—	—	—	15 Minutes
1999	"What Do You Think of It So Far?"	—	—	—	—	—	—	—	—	—	—	—	15 Minutes
1999	"Sometimes" (Les Rythmes Digitales feat. Nik Kershaw)	56	—	—	—	—	—	—	—	—	—	—	Darkdancer
2001	"Wounded"	100	—	—	—	—	—	—	—	—	—	—	To Be Frank
2012	"The Sky's the Limit"	—	—	—	—	—	—	—	—	—	—	—	Ei8ht
2012	"You're the Best"	—	—	—	—	—	—	—	—	—	—	—	Ei8ht
2015	"Men United"	—	—	—	—	—	—	—	—	—	—	—	Non-album single
2017	"Wouldn't It Be Good" (Lotus & Jerome feat. Nik Kershaw)	—	—	—	—	—	—	—	—	—	—	—	Non-album single
2020	"These Little Things EP"	—	—	—	—	—	—	—	—	—	—	—	Oxymoron
2020	"From Cloudy Bay to Malibu"	—	—	—	—	—	—	—	—	—	—	—	Oxymoron
2021	"Be Still" (Wrenne feat. Nik Kershaw & Chesney Hawkes)	—	—	—	—	—	—	—	—	—	—	—	Non-album single
2021	"Lost In You (Sunset Sessions)" (Chesney Hawkes & Nik Kershaw)	—	—	—	—	—	—	—	—	—	—	—	Non-album single

Various Artists The Anti-Heroin Project. Charity Single produced by Charles Foskett.

Guest appearances:John Parr, Elkie Brooks, Bonnie Tyler, Nik Kershaw, Holly Johnson, Kim Wilde, Hazel O'Connor, Cliff Richard, Robin Gibb, Mike Peters and others.

Year	Single	UK Chart
1986	"Live-In World" (The Anti-Heroin Project)	142

== Songwriting and Producing ==
Year	Title	Artist	Album	Contribution	Covered by
1991	The One and Only	Chesney Hawkes	Buddy's Song	Writer and Co-producer	
1991	Oxygen	Elaine Page	Love Can Do That	Writer	Petula Clark (1991); Demis Roussos (1993), Jason Donovan (1993), Anita Hegerland (1994); Colin Blunstone (1995)
1991	He's Got a Hold On Me	Bonnie Tyler	Bitterblue	Writer and Producer	
2000	At The End of a Perfect Day	Ronan Keating	Ronan (bonus track)	Co-Writer	
