= Then and Now (Nik Kershaw album) =

Then & Now

Greatest hits album by Nik Kershaw
- Released: 2005
- Recorded: 1983–2005
- Genres: Pop rock; new wave
- Length: 79:11
- Label: Universal Music TV
- Producer: Nik Kershaw

Nik Kershaw chronology
To Be Frank (2001)	Then & Now (2005)	You've Got to Laugh (2006)

Then & Now: The Very Best of Nik Kershaw, released in 2005 by Universal Music TV, combines Nik Kershaw hits, collaborations and a few new tracks.

== CD track listing ==
All tracks are written by Nik Kershaw, except track 14 written by Jacques Lucont and Nik Kershaw.

No.	Title	From album	Length
1.	"Wouldn't It Be Good"	Human Racing	4:37
2.	"Dancing Girls"	Human Racing	3:18
3.	"I Won't Let the Sun Go Down on Me"	Human Racing	3:12
4.	"Human Racing"	Human Racing	3:49
5.	"The Riddle"	The Riddle	3:54
6.	"Wide Boy"	The Riddle	3:13
7.	"Don Quixote"	The Riddle	4:14
8.	"When a Heart Beats"	Radio Musicola	3:55
9.	"Nobody Knows"	Radio Musicola	3:08
10.	"Radio Musicola"	Radio Musicola	4:00
11.	"One Step Ahead"	The Works	3:51
12.	"Elisabeth's Eyes"	The Works	4:19
13.	"Old Friend" (Elton John and Nik Kershaw)	Duets	4:14
14.	"Sometimes" (Les Rythmes Digitales featuring Nik Kershaw)	Darkdancer	4:56
15.	"Somebody Loves You"	15 Minutes	3:58
16.	"Wounded"	To Be Frank	3:39
17.	"Times Like These"	New Song	4:43
18.	"Dangerous Eyes"	New Song	4:08
19.	"Cloud Nine"	New Song	4:44
20.	"What It Is"	New Song	3:34
Total length:			79:21

All songs produced by Nik Kershaw, except Songs 1-7 produced by Peter Collins, Songs 11-12 co-produced with Julian Mendelsohn, Song 14 produced by Jacques Lucont

== DVD track listing ==
1. "Wouldn't It Be Good"
2. "I Won't Let the Sun Go Down on Me" (live version)
3. "Dancing Girls"
4. "Wide Boy" (full-length version)
5. "Nobody Knows"
6. "Human Racing"
7. "Don Quixote"
8. "When a Heart Beats"
9. "Radio Musicola"
10. "Elisabeth's Eyes"
