= The Essential (Nik Kershaw album) =

Greatest hits album by Nik Kershaw
- Released: 2000
- Recorded: 1983–1990
- Genres: Pop rock; new wave
- Length: 74:15
- Label: Spectrum Music
- Producer: Nik Kershaw

Nik Kershaw chronology
15 Minutes (1999)	The Essential (2000)	To Be Frank (2001)

The Essential is a compilation album by the English singer Nik Kershaw, released in 2000 by Spectrum Music. It features singles and album tracks from his first four studio albums: Human Racing (1984), The Riddle (1984), Radio Musicola (1986), and The Works (1989).

== Track listing ==
All tracks written by Nik Kershaw.

No.	Title	Original album	Length
1.	"Wouldn't It Be Good"	Human Racing	4:32
2.	"I Won't Let the Sun Go Down on Me"	Human Racing	3:22
3.	"Dancing Girls"	Human Racing	3:37
4.	"The Riddle"	The Riddle	3:54
5.	"Wide Boy"	The Riddle	3:19
6.	"Nobody Knows"	Radio Musicola	4:07
7.	"One Step Ahead"	The Works	3:48
8.	"Human Racing"	Human Racing	4:18
9.	"Don Quixote"	The Riddle	4:09
10.	"Drum Talk"	Human Racing	3:04
11.	"Shame on You"	Human Racing	3:32
12.	"Bogart"	Human Racing	4:41
13.	"When a Heart Beats"	Radio Musicola	4:15
14.	"Wild Horses"	The Riddle	4:00
15.	"Gone to Pieces"	Human Racing	3:09
16.	"Radio Musicola"	Radio Musicola	5:38
17.	"Cloak and Dagger"	Human Racing	4:50
18.	"Save the Whale"	The Riddle	5:50
Total length:			74:15

== Certifications ==
Region	Certification	Certified units/sales
United Kingdom (BPI)	Silver	60,000^{‡}
^{‡} Sales+streaming figures based on certification alone.
