= The Best of Nik Kershaw =

Compilation album by Nik Kershaw
- Released: 1993
- Genres: Pop; new wave; pop rock
- Label: Music Club International
- Producer: Nik Kershaw

Nik Kershaw chronology
The Works (1989)	The Best of Nik Kershaw (1993)	15 Minutes (1999)

The Best of Nik Kershaw (1993) is a compilation album by the English singer-songwriter Nik Kershaw. It contains selected 12 inch mixes, B-sides, album tracks and his hits. It is released under the Music Club International label.

== Track listing ==
1. "Wouldn't It Be Good" (Extended 12" mix)
2. "The Riddle"
3. "Dark Glasses"
4. "Don Quixote"
5. "Monkey Business"
6. "When a Heart Beats"
7. "City of Angels"
8. "Dancing Girls"
9. "Progress"
10. "I Won't Let the Sun Go Down on Me"
11. "So Quiet"
12. "Radio Musicola"
13. "She Cries"
14. "Nobody Knows" (Extended 12" mix)
15. "Cloak and Dagger"
16. "Wide Boy"
17. "One of Our Fruit Machines is Missing"
18. "Human Racing" (Extended 12" mix)
