= No Frills (Nik Kershaw album) =

Live album by Nik Kershaw
- Released: 1 February 2010
- Recorded: 2010
- Studio: Shorthouse
- Genres: Rock; acoustic
- Length: 1:03:00
- Labels: Koch; Shorthouse
- Producer: Nik Kershaw

Nik Kershaw chronology
You've Got to Laugh (2006)	No Frills (2010)	Ei8ht (2012)

No Frills is the live album by the English singer Nik Kershaw, recorded live at his own Shorthouse Studios and released on 1 February 2010 under his own record label. Initially, the album was only available for purchase online via Kershaw's web site through his own indie vanity label, Shorthouse Records.

Kershaw regards his subsequent album Ei8ht as his eighth album as No Frills was "90 per cent old songs, it was just different acoustic versions of those old songs. I didn't really count that as a collection of original work."

== Track listing ==
1. "Oh You Beautiful Thing" – 3:27
2. "Have a Nice Life" – 4:06
3. "Dancing Girls" – 3:48
4. "Somebody Loves You" – 4:12
5. "Lost in You" – 3:22
6. "The Riddle" – 4:07
7. "Loud, Confident & Wrong" – 3:43
8. "Fiction" – 3:35
9. "Don Quixote" – 5:34
10. "Oxygen" – 4:31
11. "Wounded" – 3:58
12. "Wouldn't It Be Good" - 4:33
13. "Billy" - 4:02
14. "This Broken Man" - 4:42
15. "I Won't Let the Sun Go Down on Me" - 5:27
