= Wide Boy (disambiguation) =

Wide boy is a British term for a man who lives by his wits, wheeling and dealing.

Wide Boy may refer to:

== Film ==
- Wide Boy (film), a 1952 British crime film directed by Ken Hughes

== Music ==
- "Wide Boy" (song), a 1985 single by English musician Nik Kershaw
- "Wide Boy", a 1980 single by English duo Godley & Creme
- Wideboys, an English UK garage/house production team
- Wide Boy Awake, an English new wave duo, active 1982–1984

== Other uses ==
- Wide Boy, the predecessor to the Super Game Boy which played Game Boy games on a Famicom or NES.
- Wide-Boy 64, an adapter accessory for the Nintendo 64 video game console that played Game Boy games
- Wideboy, a novel by Simon Nye adapted as the television series Frank Stubbs Promotes
