= Oxymoron (disambiguation) =

An oxymoron is a rhetorical device involving the use of contradiction.

Oxymoron may also refer to:

- Oxymoron (band), a punk band
- Oxymoron (Nik Kershaw album), a 2020 album
- Oxymoron (Schoolboy Q album), a 2014 album
- The Oxymoron, a student newspaper at the University of Oxford

== See also ==
- Oxymorrons, an American alternative hip-hop band
- Oxxxymiron, Russian hip-hop artist
