= Elisabeth's Eyes =

Single by Nik Kershaw

from the album The Works
- B-side: "My Friend John"
- Released: 1 May 1989
- Genre: New wave; pop rock
- Length: 4:40 (album version); 4:37 (single version); 6:02 (extended version)
- Label: MCA
- Songwriter(s): Nik Kershaw
- Producer(s): Nik Kershaw; Julian Mendelsohn

Nik Kershaw singles chronology
"One Step Ahead" (1989)	"Elisabeth's Eyes" (1989)	"I Wanna Change the Score" (1991)

Music video
- "Elisabeth's Eyes" on YouTube

"Elisabeth's Eyes" is a song by the English pop musician Nik Kershaw, released in 1989 as the second and final single from his fourth studio album, The Works (1989). It was written by Kershaw, and produced by Kershaw and Julian Mendelsohn.

== Background ==
Kershaw began writing material for his fourth studio album in early 1987 and went to Los Angeles later in the year to record with producer Peter Wolf. Ten tracks were completed, but Kershaw was ultimately dissatisfied with the results. When he returned to England, he began remixing and re-recording the material with the help of Julian Mendelsohn. Kershaw also decided to drop two of the intended tracks and replace them with two new ones, "One Step Ahead" and "Elisabeth's Eyes".

"Elisabeth's Eyes" was inspired by the pen pal relationship of Elisabeth Allan, a teacher from Essex, and Willie Darden, an American man who served 14 years on death row and was executed in Florida in 1988 for murder during the course of a robbery. Kershaw told radio presenter Simon Mayo in 1989, "For reasons she didn't really understand, Elisabeth began to write to him in prison and he wrote back. Towards the end he was writing three or four times a day. The letters were very personal, almost like love letters. They never met, but she was his one link with the outside world. I hope the song might help other people in Willie's position."

Kershaw became aware of Allan and Darden after reading a newspaper article two days before Darden's execution about Allan and her campaign for his release. Kershaw then wrote the song a week later. After doing further research into Darden's case, Kershaw also believed he was innocent. He told the Sunday Mercury in May 1989, "Any new subject you start finding out about changes your life. Death row wasn't something that concerned me before, and I didn't think about the death penalty very much."

== Release ==
"Elisabeth's Eyes" was released by MCA Records on 7-inch vinyl, 12-inch vinyl and CD formats. The B-side is the non-album track "My Friend John". An extended version of "Elisabeth's Eyes" is included on the 12-inch and CD formats, and a club dub version was included on the 12-inch single.

"Elisabeth's Eyes" was Kershaw's first single to fail to enter the top 100 of the UK singles chart, ending a successive run of twelve entries. The single, which peaked at number 105, sold approximately 3,000 copies within the first five weeks of its release. It was originally scheduled for release on 24 April but this was pushed back to 1 May.

== Promotion ==
The song's music video was directed by Mike Ross and produced by Ali Newling. On 22 May 1989, Kershaw performed the song on the British television talk show Wogan.

== Critical reception ==
On its release, Geoff Zeppelin of Record Mirror wrote, "What a pity that this number should have all the emotional impact of a soggy bowl of cornflakes. Where are the royalties going Nik?" Ian Gittins of Melody Maker stated, "Kershaw wants to be taken seriously, so I furrowed my brow and listened intently to every nuance of 'Elisabeth's Eyes'. It's still shit." Jennifer Grant of the Perthshire Advertiser commented, "It's the new look, slick-backed single from midget Nik. But a new image hasn't altered his musical style any as this is predictable Kershaw pop."

Marcus Hodge of the Cambridge Evening News felt the song to be "unfortunately too watery and bland to touch early belters like 'I Won't Let the Sun Go Down on Me'." Dick Jones of the Faversham Times stated it was "another token effort" from Kershaw and "disappointingly typical". He added, "Little Nik will never be a millionaire churning out this sort of pleasant, but immemorable trivial. The days of 'Wouldn't It Be Good' and 'Human Racing' have well and truly gone yet pop's Mr. Clean appears to be trying to salvage further success from past glory." In a 2020 retrospective review of The Works, Steve Harnell of Classic Pop noted the "beautiful reggae bounce" of the song and added that it "should have been [a] hit".

== Formats ==
7-inch single

1. "Elisabeth's Eyes" – 4:37
2. "My Friend John" – 4:08

12-inch single

1. "Elisabeth's Eyes" (Extended version) – 6:02
2. "My Friend John" – 4:08
3. "Elisabeth's Eyes" (Club Dub) – 4:41

CD Single

1. "Elisabeth's Eyes" (7" version) – 4:39
2. "My Friend John" – 4:01
3. "Elisabeth's Eyes" (Extended version) – 6:04

== Personnel ==
- Nik Kershaw, Julian Mendelsohn – producers, mixing on "Elisabeth's Eyes"
- Michael H. Brauer – remixer on extended version and club dub of "Elisabeth's Eyes"
- Julian Mendelsohn – co-production on extended version and club dub of "Elisabeth's Eyes"
- Nik Kershaw – producer of "My Friend John"
