= Radio Musicola =

Studio album by Nik Kershaw
- Released: 20 October 1986
- Recorded: 1985–1986
- Studio: Swanyard Studios (London); Sarm West Studios (London)
- Genre: Synth-pop; electronic; pop rock
- Length: 48:50
- Label: MCA
- Producer: Nik Kershaw

Nik Kershaw chronology
The Riddle (1984)	Radio Musicola (1986)	The Works (1989)

Singles from Radio Musicola
- 1. "When a Heart Beats" Released: November 1985; 2. "Nobody Knows" Released: September 1986; 3. "Radio Musicola" Released: November 1986; 4. "James Cagney" Released: 1987 (Germany)

Professional ratings
Review scores
Source	Rating
AllMusic	2/5 stars
Record Mirror	2.5/5 stars
Sounds	3.5/5 stars

Radio Musicola is the third studio album by the English singer-songwriter Nik Kershaw, released on 20 October 1986 by MCA Records, just under two years after Kershaw's previous studio album, The Riddle (1984). It was the first studio album to be produced by Kershaw. It features guest backing vocalists, including Icehouse's Iva Davies, and Night's Stevie Lange, and Miriam Stockley.

The album was released to critical acclaim, but wasn't as successful as Kershaw's previous studio albums. It peaked at #47 on the UK Albums Chart, marking the beginning of a downturn in Kershaw's fortunes on the album charts. Four singles were issued from Radio Musicola: "When a Heart Beats", "Nobody Knows", "Radio Musicola", and "James Cagney", but none of them reached the Top 20, a first for Kershaw. However, Kershaw did find some minor success with the aforementioned single "When a Heart Beats" (which was not featured on the LP release, only on the cassette and CD versions of the album). The track "Running Scared" was dismissed as title track of the film Running Scared (1986). The album (to date) remains Kershaw's last album to make the Top 75, and was his last to receive a certification, being certified silver by the BPI.

After the original release, the album remained out of print on any format for many years. However, the album became available via online MP3 download on major sites such as Amazon, and iTunes.

== Background ==
The album showcased Kershaw's frustration at the time, with subjects of integrity – media scepticism (particularly towards tabloid journalism), privacy, insecurity and mass-produced run-of-the-mill pop music ("Why can't you let us do it like Joni [Mitchell] does it? There you go again, giving it your very best – trying so hard to make it sound like all the rest"). The subject is reflected in the cover artwork as well, depicting a faux pocket radio made by Phil Warren based on the Sony TR-63. The LP record release featured 1950s style spoof advertisements with the song titles woven in, some of which were replicated in the compact disc's booklet.

== Release and chart performance ==
The album's first single in the United Kingdom was "When a Heart Beats", which peaked at #27 upon its release, the first time that a lead single from a Kershaw album failed to hit the Top 20 in the UK. It became a bigger hit in Ireland, peaking at #14. Further singles from the album were "Nobody Knows" and the title track "Radio Musicola", which peaked at #44, and #43 respectively.

When Kershaw was asked about the poor sales of the album he said:

"I didn't keep their attention – two albums in nine months was a stupid idea because the next one took two and a half years and a lot of people lost interest and went elsewhere, which is fair enough. And the music changed a little bit as well and I produced it myself so that might have been a reason."

== Track listing ==
All tracks are written by Nik Kershaw.

Side one
No.	Title	Length
1.	"Radio Musicola"	5:53
2.	"Nobody Knows"	4:21
3.	"L.A.B.A.T.Y.D."	4:14
4.	"What the Papers Say"	3:33
5.	"Life Goes On"	5:02

Side two
No.	Title	Length
6.	"Running Scared"	5:03
7.	"James Cagney"	5:20
8.	"Don't Let Me Out of My Cage"	4:34
9.	"Violet to Blue"	6:16
Total length:		44:20

Bonus track on compact disc and cassette releases (track 9)
No.	Title	Length
10.	"When a Heart Beats"	4:30

== Personnel ==
Credits are adapted from the album's liner notes.

Musicians

- Nik Kershaw – lead and background vocals; guitars; keyboards; computers
- Andy Richards – keyboards; computers; Fairlight CMI programming
- Paul "Wix" Wickens – keyboards
- Tim Moore – keyboards
- Robin Cruikshank – keyboards
- Rupert Greenall – keyboards
- Simon Phillips – drums
- Mark Brzezicki – drums; drum programming
- Charlie Morgan – drums
- Mark Price – drums
- Steve Brzezicki – bass guitar
- Felix Krish – bass guitar
- Kuma Harada – bass guitar
- Dennis Smith – bass guitar
- Tim Sanders – saxophones
- Simon Clarke – saxophone; flute
- Roddy Lorimer – trumpet; flugelhorn
- Steve Sidwell – trumpet
- Peter Thoms – trombone
- Gary Wallace – percussion
- Iva Davies – backing vocals
- Miriam Stockley – backing vocals
- Stevie Lange – backing vocals
- Sheri Kershaw – backing vocals
- Carol Kenyon – backing vocals
- Martin Taylor – backing vocals
- Gary Dyson – backing vocals

Production and artwork

- Nik Kershaw – producers
- Stuart Bruce – engineer; mixer
- Robin Cruikshank – assistant engineer
- Ian Cooper – mastering
- Phil Warren – Model maker
- Richard Evans – Design and art direction
- Andrew Ellis – photography
- Icon – Artwork

== Chart performance ==
Album

Chart (1986)	Peak position
Australia (Kent Music Report)	92
Canadian Albums Chart	87
UK Albums Chart	47

== Certifications ==
Region	Certification	Certified units/sales
United Kingdom (BPI)	Silver	60,000^{^}
^{^} Shipments figures based on certification alone.

== See also ==
- List of albums that were released in 1986
- Nik Kershaw's discography
