= Ei8ht =

Ei8ht may refer to:

- Ei8ht (album), 2012 Nik Kershaw album
- Eight (Shinedown album), stylized as Ei8ht, 2026 Shinedown album
- Ei8ht Mile, 2020 Darren Diggs album
- Ei8ht, a logo used by WJW
- "Ei8ht", a segment from The Simpsons episode "Treehouse of Horror XXXIV"
- Ei8ht, alternate stage name of Livvi Franc
