= Nobody Knows (Nik Kershaw song) =

- Cover of the Nobody Knows 7" Single

Single by Nik Kershaw

from the album Radio Musicola
- B-side: "One of Our Fruit Machines Is Missing"
- Released: 29 September 1986
- Genre: Synth-pop; electronic; pop rock
- Length: 4:21 (album version); 4:16 (single version); 7:29 (extended version)
- Label: MCA
- Songwriter: Nik Kershaw
- Producer: Nik Kershaw

Nik Kershaw singles chronology
"When a Heart Beats" (1985)	"Nobody Knows" (1986)	"Radio Musicola" (1986)

Music video
- "Nobody Knows" on YouTube

"Nobody Knows" is a song by the English singer-songwriter Nik Kershaw. It was released as the lead single from his third studio album Radio Musicola (1986). The release was Kershaw's tenth single, and features the non-album track, "One of Our Fruit Machines Is Missing", as its B-side.

== Background ==
The single reached No. 44 on the UK singles chart in 1986, which marked the beginning of a downturn in Kershaw's fortunes on the single charts. It also meant that it was the first time that a Kershaw single failed to make the top 40 since his first single, "I Won't Let the Sun Go Down on Me", in 1983.

== Writing ==
The song's lyrics refer to tabloid journalism, the paparazzi, and the public's right to know intimate details of celebrities' lives.

== Release ==
The single was released in the United Kingdom, Germany, Canada, Australia, Portugal, Italy, and France. The B-side for the single "One of Our Fruit Machines Is Missing" was exclusive to the single, written and produced solely by Kershaw. It has only been released on the compilation album The Best of Nik Kershaw (1993) since, which also featured the extended 12" mix of "Nobody Knows".

== Track listing ==
7" single (MCA NIK 10)
A. "Nobody Knows" – 4:18
B. "One of Our Fruit Machines Is Missing (Instrumental)" – 3:38

12" single (MCA NIKT 10)
A. "Nobody Knows" (Extended Mix) – 7:29
B1. "One of Our Fruit Machines Is Missing (Instrumental)" – 3:38
B2. "Nobody Knows" – 4:18

== Personnel ==
Credits are adapted from the album's liner notes.

- Nik Kershaw – lead and background vocals; guitars; keyboards; computers
- Andy Richards – keyboards; computers
- Paul "Wix" Wickens – keyboards
- Mark Brzezicki – drums; drum programming
- Mark Price – additional drums
- Tim Sanders – tenor saxophone
- Simon Clarke – alto saxophone
- Roddy Lorimer – trumpet
- Steve Sidwell – trumpet
- Peter Thoms – trombone
- Iva Davies – backing vocals
- Miriam Stockley – backing vocals
- Stevie Lange – backing vocals
- Gary Dyson – backing vocals

== Charts ==
Chart (1986)	Peak position
UK singles chart	44
Australian Singles Chart	73
Irish Singles Chart	20
Japanese Singles Chart	2
