= Radio Musicola (song) =

Single by Nik Kershaw

from the album Radio Musicola
- B-side: "L.A.B.A.T.Y.D."
- Released: 24 November 1986
- Genre: Synth-pop; electronic; pop rock
- Length: 5:53 (album version); 4:16 (single version); 7:15 (extended version)
- Label: MCA
- Songwriter: Nik Kershaw
- Producer: Nik Kershaw

Nik Kershaw singles chronology
"Nobody Knows" (1986)	"Radio Musicola" (1986)	"James Cagney" (1987)

Music video
- "Radio Musicola" on YouTube

Radio Musicola is a song by the English pop singer Nik Kershaw. It was released as the third single from his third studio album of the same name.

The release was the eleventh of Kershaw's career and was his third single to fail to reach the UK Singles Chart Top 40, peaking at No. 43.

== Track listing ==
7" single (MCA NIK 11)

1. "Radio Musicola" – 4:16
2. " L.A.B.A.T.Y.D." – 4:12

12" single (MCA NIKT 11)

1. "Radio Musicola" (Extended Mix) – 7:15
2. " L.A.B.A.T.Y.D." – 4:12
3. "Radio Musicola" – 4:16

== Personnel ==
Credits are adapted from the album's liner notes.

- Nik Kershaw – lead and background vocals; guitars; keyboards; computers
- Andy Richards – keyboards; computers
- Paul "Wix" Wickens – keyboards
- Tim Sanders – tenor saxophone; soprano saxophone
- Simon Clarke – alto saxophone; flute
- Roddy Lorimer – flugelhorn; trumpet
- Steve Sidwell – trumpet
- Peter Thoms – trombone
- Iva Davies – backing vocals
- Miriam Stockley – backing vocals
- Stevie Lange – backing vocals
- Gary Dyson – backing vocals
- Sheri Kershaw – backing vocals

== Charts ==
Chart performance for "Radio Musicola"
Chart (1986)	Peak position
UK Singles Chart	43
