= Libération (album) =

Studio album by Les Rythmes Digitales
- Released: 29 July 1996
- Length: 48:18
- Label: Wall of Sound
- Producer: Jacques Lu Cont

Les Rythmes Digitales chronology
Libération (1996)	Darkdancer (1999)

Professional ratings
Review scores
Source	Rating
Muzik	3.5/5 stars

Libération is the first studio album released by Les Rythmes Digitales. It was released in limited fashion in 1996.

== Track listing ==
1. "Scimitar"
2. "Oberonne"
3. "Carlos"
4. "American Metal"
5. "La Solution?"
6. "Vive Le Velo"
7. "Jida"
8. "Kontakte"
9. "Ormalite"
