= Stuart Bruce (engineer) =

British record producer (born 1962)

- Born: 20 October 1962 (age 63)
- Occupation: recording engineer
- Years active: 2016–present

Stuart Robert Bruce (born 20 October 1962) is an English recording engineer. He was the engineer for the recording of the Band Aid's charity single "Do They Know It's Christmas?" on 25 November 1984. He was born in Northolt, Middlesex.

Bruce started his career at Trevor Horn's Sarm West Studios. When Horn offered Bob Geldof and Midge Ure the studio free of charge for 24 hours to record the charity single, but was unavailable to produce it, Bruce was approached to engineer and mix what became one of the biggest selling singles ever. With many of the most famous artists of the time participating, and seven film crews in attendance, he worked straight through that day and night. He was on his way to the mastering suite the next morning when he heard the song on the radio; Geldof had been given a 1/4 inch stereo tape to take to The Radio 1 Breakfast Show.

The reputation Bruce gained of being able to get a track down in difficult circumstances later led to him being chosen to engineer the Guitar Trio album by Al Di Meola, Paco de Lucía and John McLaughlin.

Bruce has worked with many leading artists from the 1980s onwards, including Duran Duran, Spandau Ballet, Kate Bush, Stevie Wonder, Bob Marley, Art Garfunkel, Yes, Van Morrison and Nik Kershaw. He played slide guitar on Frankie Goes to Hollywood's "The Ballad of 32" and his spoken voice can be heard on their cover of "Born to Run".

He was nominated for Best Recording Engineer at the Juno Awards of 1997 for his work with Loreena McKennitt.

== Discography ==
- Buggles – Adventures In Modern Recording - 1981
- Yukihiro Takahashi = 高橋幸宏* – What, Me Worry? ボク、大丈夫!! - 1982
- Akira Inoue – Cryptogram - 1982
- Monsoon – Third Eye - 1983
- The Mood – Passion In Dark Rooms - 1983
- Yes – 90125 - 1983
- Judith Davidson – Going Places - 1983
- Frankie Goes To Hollywood – Welcome To The Pleasuredome - 1984
- The Rescue – Messages - 1984
- Spælimenninir Í Hoydølum – Á Ferð - 1984
- Nik Kershaw – Human Racing - 1984
- Various – I Q 6 Zang Tumb Tuum Sampled - 1985
- Andrew Poppy – The Beating Of Wings - 1985
- Second Image – Strange Reflections - 1985
- Nik Kershaw – When A Heart Beats - 1985
- Andrew Poppy – The Amusement - 1986
- That Petrol Emotion – It's A Good Thing - 1986
- That Petrol Emotion – Natural Kind Of Joy - 1986
- Nik Kershaw – Radio Musicola - 1986
- That Petrol Emotion – Manic Pop Thrill - 1986
- 杏里 – Trouble In Paradise - 1986
- Akira Inoue – Tokyo Installation - 1986
- Total Contrast – Kiss - 1987
- Total Contrast – Beat To Beat - 1987
- Nik Kershaw – James Cagney - 1987
- Martin Stephenson and the Daintees – Gladsome, Humour & Blue - 1988
- Shriekback – Go Bang! - 1988
- Elaine Paige – The Queen Album - 1988
- A Brief Conversation Ending In Divorce - David Sylvian - 1989
- Barry White – Follow That And See (Where It Leads Y'All) - 1989
- Hurrah! – Big Sky - 1989
