= One Step Ahead (Nik Kershaw song) =

Single by Nik Kershaw

from the album The Works
- B-side: "When I Grow Up"
- Released: 23 January 1989
- Genre: Pop rock
- Length: 3:53 (album version); 3:38 (single version); 8:14 (extended version)
- Label: MCA
- Songwriter(s): Nik Kershaw
- Producer(s): Nik Kershaw; Julian Mendelsohn

Nik Kershaw singles chronology
| "James Cagney" (1987) | "One Step Ahead" (1989) | "Elisabeth's Eyes" (1989) |

Music video
- "One Step Ahead" on YouTube

"One Step Ahead" is a song by the English singer-songwriter Nik Kershaw, released on 23 January 1989 as the lead single from his fourth studio album The Works (1989). It was written by Kershaw, and produced by Kershaw and Julian Mendelsohn. A music video was filmed to promote the single, and Kershaw also performed it on the Dutch TV show POP Formule.

"One Step Ahead" reached No. 55 in the UK and remained in the charts for two weeks. It would be Kershaw's last appearance on the UK singles chart until 1999's "Somebody Loves You".

== Background ==
Kershaw began writing material for his fourth studio album in early 1987 and went to Los Angeles later in the year to record with producer Peter Wolf. Ten tracks were completed, but Kershaw was ultimately dissatisfied with the results. When he returned to England, he began remixing and re-recording the material with the help of Julian Mendelsohn. Kershaw also decided to drop two of the intended tracks and replace them with two new ones, "One Step Ahead" and "Elisabeth's Eyes".

In a 1989 interview with Record Mirror, Kershaw said of the song, "It was written when the Olympics were on. All that training for a piece of metal. There must be more to it than that."

== Critical reception ==
On its release, Music & Media described "One Step Ahead" as "well crafted pop with funky overtones" and added, "Check out the extended up-beat chorus on the end". Tony Beard of Record Mirror commented, "Nik now makes adult pop for people with a Level 42 fixation. It's all fairly jaunty, a semi-serious funk strut, but it sounds as if it's trying too hard, aiming for the charts and the plaudits and just about achieving neither."

== Formats ==
7-inch single

1. "One Step Ahead" – 3:38
2. "When I Grow Up" – 3:39

12-inch single

1. "One Step Ahead (Industrial Mix)" – 8:14
2. "One Step Ahead (7" Version)" – 3:38
3. "When I Grow Up" – 3:39

CD single

1. "One Step Ahead (7" Version)" – 3:38
2. "When I Grow Up" – 3:39
3. "Wouldn't It Be Good" – 4:32
4. "The Riddle" – 3:53

== Personnel ==
- Nik Kershaw – producer and mixing on "One Step Ahead" and "When I Grow Up"
- Julian Mendelsohn – producer of "One Step Ahead", mixing on "One Step Ahead" and "When I Grow Up", remixer on "One Step Ahead (Industrial Mix)"
- Paul Wright – engineer on "One Step Ahead (Industrial Mix)"
- Dave Eden – assistant engineer on "One Step Ahead (Industrial Mix)"

== Charts ==
| Chart (1989) | Peak position |
|---|---|
| UK Singles Chart | 55 |
