= You've Got to Laugh =

Studio album by Nik Kershaw
- Released: 26 October 2006
- Recorded: 2006
- Genre: Rock
- Length: 51:44
- Label: Shorthouse
- Producer: Nik Kershaw

Nik Kershaw chronology
| Then and Now (2005) | You've Got to Laugh (2006) | No Frills (2010) |

You've Got to Laugh is the seventh studio album by the English singer Nik Kershaw, released on 26 October 2006 under his own record label Shorthouse. Initially, the album was only available for purchase online via his web site through his own studio, Shorthouse Records. The album is currently available for digital download via iTunes or eMusic, as well as other music streaming services such as Spotify.

In a 2008 interview, Kershaw spoke of the album. "You've Got to Laugh took about five years to get together. That wasn't intense recording, obviously. I just waited until I'd got enough tracks and that was the time to release it. Had it not been for my girlfriend, it probably wouldn't have been released at all. The songs are all about my own experiences or those of people around me; they're about friends and foes; they're about real life, which means there's nothing too glamorous going on".

No songs from the album were released as singles. At the end of the CD sleeve, there is a dedication note to Kershaw's late father, Douglas John Kershaw (24 February 1920 – 30 July 2005). The holding page on the official Nik Kershaw website had an instrumental in-work version of the closing track "You Don't Have to Be the Sun".

== Track listing ==
All songs written by Nik Kershaw.

| No. | Title | Length |
|---|---|---|
| 1. | "Can't Get Arrested" | 4:41 |
| 2. | "Oh, You Beautiful Thing" | 3:15 |
| 3. | "Lost" | 4:40 |
| 4. | "All About You" | 4:35 |
| 5. | "Promises, Promises" | 3:52 |
| 6. | "I Hope You're Happy Now" | 3:20 |
| 7. | "Old House" | 4:02 |
| 8. | "Yeah, Yeah" | 3:50 |
| 9. | "Born Yesterday" | 4:50 |
| 10. | "Loud, Confident & Wrong" | 3:39 |
| 11. | "She Could Be the One" | 5:17 |
| 12. | "You Don't Have to Be the Sun" | 5:39 |
| Total length: | | 51:40 |

== Credits ==
Credits adapted from AllMusic.

Personnel

- Nik Kershaw – vocals, guitars, keyboards, programming
- Stuart Ross - bass (tracks 5–7, 9, 12)
- Nick Beggs – bass, Chapman Stick (tracks 2–4, 11)
- Julian Brown – drums (tracks 2–6, 8–9)
- Simon Phillips – drums (tracks 1, 7, 11)
- Imogen Heap – backing vocals (tracks 5, 8, 12)
- Lily Gonzalez – backing vocals (tracks 1–4, 11)

Production

- Julian Brown's drums recorded by Mark "Tufty" Evans at Wispington Studios
- Tracks 8 & 12 mixed by Mark "Tufty" Evans at Wispington Studios
- Mastered by Simon Heyworth at Super Audio Mastering, Devon
- Published by Zomba Music

Artwork

- Graphic Design by Aurile Ltd.
- Main cover artwork by Frank Renlie
- Photography by Kim Zumwalt
