= Night (rock band) =

Night was a rock band formed in 1978 in Los Angeles

Night was a rock band formed in 1978 in Los Angeles, California, United States, whose personnel were veteran British-based session musicians.

== History ==
Night's vocalists Stevie Vann (a.k.a. Stevie Lange) and Chris Thompson had met when Vann had provided backing vocals for the 1978 album Watch by Manfred Mann's Earth Band then fronted by Thompson. Soon afterwards Thompson invited Vann to join him in a new outfit, Vann's session group known as Bones having recently disbanded and Thompson having reduced his involvement with Manfred Mann's Earth Band. Before officially forming as "Night" in LA, the new group toured the London pub-rock scene in 1978 under the name "Filthy McNasty" performing the mix of originals and covers that became their first album. They are recorded on "A Week at the Bridge" (The Bridge House, Canning Town) and had their UK release event at The Golden Lion, Fulham.

Richard Perry produced two albums by Night for his Planet label; the group's eponymous 1979 debut album yielded two US Top 40 hits: "Hot Summer Nights" (No. 18) and "If You Remember Me" (No. 17).

"Hot Summer Nights", a cover of a minor Walter Egan hit, featured Lange on lead vocals and gave Night their one international hit most significantly in Australia at No. 3 with more moderate success in Canada (No. 23), the Netherlands (No. 21), New Zealand (No. 28) and South Africa (No. 13).

"If You Remember Me", recorded as the theme song for the film The Champ, was credited solely to Chris Thompson as a single release, with an album track "Cold Wind Across My Heart" - featuring both Thompson and Vann - being marketed as the second Night single. The latter track failed to chart, and the Night album peaked at a moderate No. 113, the group's gig opening for the Doobie Brothers failing to significantly boost their popularity.

A second album release by Night in 1980 entitled Long Distance produced a minor hit in its single release: "Love on the Airwaves", and was otherwise overlooked. Night had no further recordings released but did not officially disband until 1982.

Night can be seen in the 1980 film The Monster Club performing "The Stripper".

== Discography ==
=== Albums ===
Year	Title				
Year	Title	US	AUS	Label	Certifciation
1979	Night	113	19	Planet	ARIA: Gold
1980	Long Distance	—	—	Planet	
"—" denotes releases that did not chart or were not released in that territory.

=== Singles ===
Year	Title										
Year	Title	US BB	US AC	US CB	AUS	BEL (Fla)	CA	NL	NZ	SA	Certifciation
1979	"Hot Summer Nights"	18	—	26	3	21	23	21	28	13	ARIA: Gold
1979	"If You Remember Me"	17	7	19	—	—	90	—	—	—	
1979	"Cold Wind Across My Heart"	—	—	—	—	—	—	—	—	—	
1980	"Love on the Airwaves"	87	—	—	93	—	—	—	—	—	
1980	"Dr. Rock"	—	—	—	—	—	—	—	—	—	
"—" denotes releases that did not chart or were not released in that territory.

=== Reissues ===
- Night (self-titled limited edition vinyl re-issue) (2020)
- Hot Summer Nights / Love on the Airwaves (singles) (limited edition vinyl) (2020)

== Line-up ==
- Chris Thompson (vocals, guitar)
- Stevie Lange (vocals)
- Robbie McIntosh (guitar, vocals)
- Billy Kristian (bass)
- Nicky Hopkins (keyboards) 1978-1979
- Bobby Wright (keyboards) 1979-1982
- Pete Baron (drums) 1978-1979
- Bobby Guidotti (drums) 1979-1982
