= The Works (Nik Kershaw album) =

Studio album by Nik Kershaw
- Released: 22 May 1989
- Recorded: August 1987–October 1988
- Studio: Can-Am Recorders (Tarzana, California); Sarm West Studios (London); Sarm East Studios (London); Rumbo Recorders (Canoga Park, California); Ground Control (Santa Monica, California); Secret Sound (Woodland Hills, California)
- Genre: New wave; pop rock
- Length: 42:13
- Label: MCA
- Producer: Nik Kershaw; Peter Wolf; Julian Mendelsohn

Nik Kershaw chronology
Radio Musicola (1986)	The Works (1989)	The Best of Nik Kershaw (1993)

Singles from The Works
- 1. "One Step Ahead" Released: 23 January 1989; 2. "Elisabeth's Eyes" Released: 24 April 1989

Professional ratings
Review scores
Source	Rating
AllMusic	3/5 stars
Smash Hits	7.5/10 stars

The Works is the fourth studio album by the English singer-songwriter and multi-instrumentalist Nik Kershaw. It was released in 1989 and was the last album he created for MCA Records. Kershaw chose the album's title as he felt the album represented "the collected works of Nik Kershaw". He did not release any new solo material until 15 Minutes, 10 years later.

The album was not commercially successful, though the lead single "One Step Ahead" reached No. #55 in the UK. "Elisabeth's Eyes", the second and final single, failed to chart altogether.

Although the album was produced by Peter Wolf and co-produced by Brian Malouf, both singles were written shortly after Kershaw became unhappy with Wolf's production and his direction for the album. They were produced by Kershaw and Julian Mendelsohn, with the two also re-working the production of the entire album, earning them an additional production credit.

After its original release, the album remained out of print on any format for years. However, in November 2006, the album became available via online MP3 download on major sites such as Amazon and iTunes.

== Background ==
In an interview of the time, Kershaw spoke of the album's creation and production:

"In April 1987 I finished touring, after that I wrote songs for the new album. In August of that year I went to Los Angeles to record The Works album in four months with producer Peter Wolf. Back home in England I listened to the album and discovered that I hated it. I could never have promoted that album. How could I tell the people: it's a great product, buy it!, if I wouldn't have bought it myself. So I quickly wrote two more songs, among which was "One Step Ahead", and I did a lot all over again with Julian Mendelsohn in London. Eventually the record was only finished last year in October. But I must say that I'm a whole lot happier about it now."

Speaking of working with Wolf, Kershaw said:

"American producers are used to having total control over their production. But I wanted to have a say about my own songs myself. Americans want predictable songs and sounds whereas I chose the opposite. We have been fighting like cats and dogs in that studio, we were constantly clashing. In the end we decided to make a compromise, but with the result that neither of us was happy with the final result. It was all very annoying, but I also learned from it."

The track "One World" was later included on Kershaw's 1991 compilation album The Collection, while the German vinyl and Japanese CD editions of the compilation featured a re-recorded version of the track instead. In recent years, Kershaw stated via his Q&A sessions "Drum Talk" that the re-recorded version was to be a single after the release of "Elisabeth's Eyes", however this never materialised as he and the record label MCA parted company. In 1991, English pop singer Chesney Hawkes covered the song for his debut studio album Buddy's Song and it also appeared as the B-side to his third single "Secrets of the Heart". In the same year, Hawkes had scored a number one hit in the UK with the Nik Kershaw-penned song "The One and Only".

== Track listing ==
All songs are written by Nik Kershaw, except where noted.

Side one

1. "One Step Ahead" – 3:53
2. "Elisabeth's Eyes" – 4:40
3. "Take My Place" – 4:04
4. "Wounded Knee" – 3:53
5. "Cowboys & Indians" – 3:52

Side two

6. "One World" (Nik Kershaw, Peter Wolf) – 4:39
7. "Don't Ask Me" – 4:02
8. "Burning at Both Ends" – 4:05
9. "Lady on the Phone" (Kershaw, Wolf) – 4:09
10. "Walkabout" – 4:56

== Personnel ==
- Nik Kershaw – vocals, guitar, keyboards, programming, arrangements
- Peter Wolf – keyboards, synthesizer, arrangements
- Dave Clayton – keyboards
- Paul "Wix" Wickens – keyboards
- Vinnie Colaiuta – drums
- Paulinho Da Costa – percussion
- Jeff Porcaro – drums on "Walkabout"
- Dan Higgins – tenor, alto and baritone saxophone
- Larry Williams – tenor saxophone
- Gary Grant – trumpet
- Jerry Hey – trumpet
- Charles Loper – trombone
- Gary Maughan – programming
- Ina Wolf, Maxi Anderson, Michael McDonald, Nadirah Ali, Phillip Ingram, Sheri Kershaw, Siedah Garrett – backing vocals

== Singles ==
- "One Step Ahead" UK #55
  - B-side – "When I Grow Up"
- "Elisabeth's Eyes"
  - B-side – "My Friend John"
