= Human Racing =

1984 studio album by Nik Kershaw

Studio album by Nik Kershaw
- Released: 27 February 1984
- Recorded: Summer 1983
- Studios: Sarm East (London); Sarm West (London); Marcus Music (Los Angeles); Cherokee (Los Angeles)
- Genres: Pop; new wave; synth-pop; pop rock
- Length: 39:39
- Label: MCA
- Producer: Peter Collins

Nik Kershaw chronology
Human Racing (1984)	The Riddle (1984)

Singles from Human Racing
- 1. "I Won't Let the Sun Go Down on Me" Released: 9 September 1983; 2. "Wouldn't It Be Good" Released: 20 January 1984; 3. "Dancing Girls" Released: 2 April 1984; 4. "I Won't Let the Sun Go Down on Me (Re-release)" Released: 4 June 1984; 5. "Human Racing" Released: 3 September 1984

Human Racing is the debut studio album by the English singer-songwriter Nik Kershaw, released on 27 February 1984 by MCA Records. Several songs like "Drum Talk" were based around improvisation; other songs, like "I Won't Let the Sun Go Down on Me", had a political message.

Kershaw's most commercially successful solo album, it peaked at No. 5 on the UK Albums Chart and reached the top 10 in several other countries, including Germany, Finland, and Norway. The album spawned four charting singles in the United Kingdom. "Wouldn't It Be Good" peaked at No. 4 on the UK Singles Chart; "Dancing Girls" peaked at No. 13; "I Won't Let the Sun Go Down on Me" at No. 2; "Human Racing" at No. 19. Human Racing was the 22nd best-selling album of 1984 in the UK and received a nomination for Best British Album at the Brit Awards 1985. The album has been certified platinum by the British Phonographic Industry (BPI).

The album was re-released on 27 February 2012, on Universal's new Re-presents imprint featuring rare bonus content. The reissue is a 2-CD set with the original album digitally remastered from the original 1/2" mix tapes; the bonus content consists of associated 12" mixes and B-sides including a previously unreleased version of "Bogart", a special brass mix of "Shame on You" and a live version of "Cloak and Dagger" recorded at the Hammersmith Odeon.

== Critical reception ==
Professional ratings
Review scores
Source	Rating
AllMusic	3/5 stars
Billboard	Favourable
Record Mirror	2/5 stars
Smash Hits	1/10 stars

Smash Hits magazine gave the album a highly negative review, awarding it 1 out of 10, and calling it "Competent but relentlessly dull synthesised meanderings of no importance to anyone but Mr Kershaw himself (and even he doesn't sound that interested)." Reviewing retrospectively for AllMusic, critic Scott Bultman wrote of the album: "His debut, although rough around the edges, showed talent and promise."

== Track listing ==
All tracks are written by Nik Kershaw.

Side one
No.	Title	Length
1.	"Dancing Girls"	3:46
2.	"Wouldn't It Be Good"	4:32
3.	"Drum Talk"	3:10
4.	"Bogart"	4:38
5.	"Gone to Pieces"	3:11

Side two
No.	Title	Length
6.	"Shame on You"	3:33
7.	"Cloak and Dagger"	4:55
8.	"Faces"	4:05
9.	"I Won't Let the Sun Go Down on Me"	3:23
10.	"Human Racing"	4:26
Total length:		39:39

Additional tracks

Bonus tracks on 2012 release

No.	Title	Length
1.	"Dancing Girls" (extended 12" remix)	8:05
2.	"Bogart" (extended 12" remix)	4:29
3.	"Monkey Business"	3:30
4.	"Shame on You" (additional brass mix)	3:40
5.	"Drum Talk" (extended 12" remix)	5:00
6.	"Faces" (extended 12" remix)	4:40
7.	"Dark Glasses"	4:16
8.	"Wouldn't It Be Good" (extended 12" remix)	6:52
9.	"Human Racing" (extended 12" remix)	5:24
10.	"She Cries"	3:48
11.	"I Won't Let the Sun Go Down on Me" (extended 12" remix)	6:33
12.	"Cloak and Dagger" (live at Hammersmith Odeon 1984)	5:07

Original track listing
The master tapes for Human Racing are shown in the booklet that accompanies the 2012 re-release. They show the original track listing of the album was: Side 1: 1. "Drum Talk"; 2. "Wouldn't It Be Good"; 3. "Bring on the Dancing Girls"; 4. "Bogart"; 5. "Gone to Pieces"; Side 2: 1. "Shame on You"; 2. "Cloak and Dagger"; 3. "Faces"; 4. "Wide Boy"; 5. "I Won't Let the Sun Go Down"; 6. "Human Racing"; "Wide Boy" was dropped before the album's official release, but was later released on Kershaw's next studio album, The Riddle (1984). The master tapes also show that the album was completed in November 1983. The master tapes were later baked for preservation purposes. Side 1 was baked on 15 September 2011, and Side 2 on 23 February 2005.

== Personnel ==
Credits are adapted from the album's liner notes.

Musicians

- Nik Kershaw – lead and background vocals; vocal percussion and effects; guitar; bass guitar; keyboards; percussion
- Paul "Wix" Wickens – keyboards; Fairlight CMI
- Charlie Morgan – drums
- Reg Webb – keyboards
- Nick Glennie-Smith – keyboards
- Don Snow – keyboards
- Paul Westwood – additional bass guitar on "I Won't Let the Sun Go Down on Me"
- Martin Ditcham – percussion
- Jerry Hey – horns
- Gary Grant – horns
- Larry Williams – horns
- Bill Reichenbach – horns
- Kim Hutchcroft – horns
- Sheri Kershaw – backing vocals on "Faces"
- Lynda Hayes – voice-over on "Bogart"

Production and artwork

- Peter Collins – producer
- Julian Mendelsohn – engineer; mixer
- Stuart Bruce – assistant engineer
- Keith Finney – assistant engineer
- Bob Kraushaar – assistant engineer
- Roger Howorth – assistant engineer
- Nick Campey – assistant engineer

== Charts ==
=== Weekly charts ===
Weekly chart performance for Human Racing
Chart (1984)	Peak position
Australian Albums (Kent Music Report)	35
Canada Top Albums/CDs (RPM)	19
Dutch Albums (Album Top 100)	13
European Albums (Music & Media)	14
Finnish Albums (Suomen virallinen lista)	8
German Albums (Offizielle Top 100)	8
New Zealand Albums (RMNZ)	32
Norwegian Albums (VG-lista)	7
Swedish Albums (Sverigetopplistan)	38
Swiss Albums (Schweizer Hitparade)	12
UK Albums (Official Charts)	5
US Billboard 200	70

=== Year-end charts ===
Year-end chart performance for Human Racing
Chart (1984)	Position
Canada Top Albums/CDs (RPM)	64
Dutch Albums (Album Top 100)	44
German Albums (Offizielle Top 100)	22
UK Albums (Gallup)	22

== Certifications ==
Certifications for Human Racing
Region	Certification	Certified units/sales
Canada (Music Canada)	Gold	50,000^{^}
United Kingdom (BPI)	Platinum	300,000^{^}
^{^} Shipments figures based on certification alone.
