= To Be Frank =

Studio album by Nik Kershaw
- Released: 14 May 2001 (UK); 23 April 2002 (US)
- Recorded: 2000
- Genre: Britpop
- Length: 49:57
- Label: Koch (US); Eagle
- Producer: Nik Kershaw

Nik Kershaw chronology
The Essential (2000)	To Be Frank (2001)	Then and Now (2005)

Professional ratings
Review scores
Source	Rating
AllMusic	2/5 stars
PopMatters	(Favorable)

To Be Frank is the sixth solo studio album by the English singer-songwriter Nik Kershaw. The album was released in 2001 (in the UK), and 2002 (in the US) on Koch Records. The only single released from this album was "Wounded", which peaked at #100, on the UK singles chart.

== Critical reception ==
Reviewing for AllMusic, critic Jason D. Taylor wrote of the album "Feeling more like a last plea to rekindle the success of his past rather than an attempt at something new, To Be Frank is a faceless collection of material that leaves you wondering if anyone even cares anymore." Reviewing for PopMatters, critic David Medsker wrote of the album "He’s older, wiser, but most importantly, he’s better. Alter egos and multiple personalities aside, To Be Frank is one of the most focused records Kershaw’s ever done."

== Track listing ==
All songs written and composed by Nik Kershaw, unless otherwise indicated.

1. "Wounded" – 4:21
2. "Get Up" – 4:11
3. "Die Laughing" – 4:39
4. "Jane Doe" (Chesney Hawkes, Kershaw) – 4:22
5. "How Sad" – 4:16
6. "Take Me to the Church" – 4:54
7. "Hello World" – 4:20
8. "Already" – 5:13
9. "One Day" – 5:07
10. "All Is Fair" – 4:13
11. "Show Them What You're Made Of" – 4:17

== Singles ==
- Wounded UK #100

1. Wounded (Single Edit) [3:37] 2. They Said [4:30] 3. Food for Fantasy [4:26]
