= Darkdancer =

Studio album by Les Rythmes Digitales
- Released: 24 May 1999
- Studio: Quad Studios, New York City
- Genre: Synth-pop; Europop; post-disco; electronica
- Length: 53:43
- Label: Wall of Sound
- Producer: Jacques Lu Cont

Les Rythmes Digitales chronology
Libération (1996)	Darkdancer (1999)

Singles from Darkdancer
- 1. "Jacques Your Body (Make Me Sweat)" Released: 21 July 1997; 2. "Music Makes You Lose Control" Released: 13 April 1998; 3. "(Hey You) What's That Sound?" Released: 5 October 1998; 4. "Sometimes" Released: 26 July 1999

Professional ratings
Review scores
Source	Rating
AllMusic	4.5/5 stars
Q	3/5 stars
Resident Advisor	3.5/5

Darkdancer is the second studio album by Les Rythmes Digitales, released in 1999. It peaked at number 53 on the UK Albums Chart. In 2005, it was re-released with an additional disc that included remixes, unreleased tracks, and music videos.

== Critical reception ==
In a 2005 review of the album's re-release, Paul Sullivan of BBC called it "ahead of its time" and credited it for launching much of the electro-pop vogue of the 2000s.

In 2015, Thump placed it at number 97 on the "99 Greatest Dance Albums of All Time" list.

The album was included in the book 1001 Albums You Must Hear Before You Die.

== Track listing ==
No.	Title	Length
1.	"Dreamin'"	3:33
2.	"Music Makes You Lose Control"	3:46
3.	"Soft Machine" (featuring Thomas Ribeiro)	3:36
4.	"Hypnotise"	4:52
5.	"(Hey You) What's That Sound?"	4:12
6.	"Take a Little Time" (featuring Shannon)	3:29
7.	"From: Disco to: Disco"	3:51
8.	"Brothers"	4:08
9.	"Jacques Your Body (Make Me Sweat)"	3:30
10.	"About Funk"	5:42
11.	"Sometimes" (featuring Nik Kershaw)	4:57
12.	"Damaged People" (featuring Thomas Ribeiro)	6:39

- The U.S. and Canadian editions include "MDC Vendredi" as track 9.

== Charts ==
Chart	Peak position
UK Albums (OCC)	53
