= Oxymoron (Nik Kershaw album) =

Studio album by Nik Kershaw
- Released: 16 October 2020
- Studio: Abbey Road (London)
- Length: 66:50
- Label: Audio Network
- Producer: Nik Kershaw

Nik Kershaw chronology
| Ei8ht (2012) | Oxymoron (2020) |

Singles from Oxymoron
- 1. "From Cloudy Bay to Malibu" Released: 11 September 2020

Oxymoron is the ninth studio album by the English singer-songwriter Nik Kershaw, released on 16 October 2020. The album was recorded at Abbey Road Studios.

An extended play (EP), These Little Things, containing six of the albums tracks, was released on 26 June 2020 to promote the album. The album's first and only single, "From Cloudy Bay to Malibu", was released on 11 September 2020 and was played by Ken Bruce on BBC Radio 2 two days prior. Kershaw also appeared on Robert Elms's BBC Radio London show to promote the album.

The album was released through Audio Network, a service for music used in film and TV owned by Entertainment One.

== Critical reception ==
The album received mostly positive reviews from critics, with Essentially Pop stating that the songs will "stand the test of time" like Kershaw's earlier catalogue.

== Track listing ==
All tracks written by Nik Kershaw except where noted.

1. "The Chosen Ones" – 3:59
2. "From Cloudy Bay to Malibu" – 4:27
3. "Can't Go On" – 3:47
4. "The Wind Will Blow" (Nik Kershaw, Paul Clarvis) – 3:33
5. "I Do Believe" – 4:15
6. "The Best I Can" – 4:30
7. "Roundabouts and Swings" – 3:54
8. "She Gets Me" – 4:20
9. "Babylon Brothers" – 4:41
10. "Little Star" – 3:30
11. "Let's Get Lost" – 4:43
12. "Come Back Tomorrow" – 3:34
13. "These Little Things" – 5:09
14. "Long Live the King" – 3:19
15. "The Smallest Soul" (Nik Kershaw, Paul Clarvis) – 4:23
16. "They Were There" – 4:34
