= The Riddle (album) =

1984 studio album by Nik Kershaw

Studio album by Nik Kershaw
- Released: 19 November 1984
- Recorded: 1984
- Studios: Sarm East (London); Sarm West (London)
- Genres: Synth-pop; jazz; jazz fusion
- Length: 42:32
- Label: MCA
- Producer: Peter Collins

Nik Kershaw chronology
Human Racing (1984)	The Riddle (1984)	Radio Musicola (1986)

Singles from The Riddle
- 1. "The Riddle" Released: 5 November 1984; 2. "Wide Boy" Released: 4 March 1985; 3. "Don Quixote" Released: 22 July 1985

Professional ratings
Review scores
Source	Rating
AllMusic	4.5/5 stars
Billboard	Favourable
Džuboks	Favourable
Record Mirror	3/5 stars
Rolling Stone	2/5 stars
Smash Hits	6.5/10 stars

The Riddle is the second studio album by the English singer-songwriter Nik Kershaw, released on 19 November 1984 by MCA Records.

On release, the album was received favourably by the majority of music critics. It peaked at number eight on the UK Albums Chart and reached the top 10 in New Zealand and Norway. The album spawned three charting singles in the United Kingdom—"The Riddle" peaked at number three on the UK Singles Chart; "Wide Boy" at number nine; "Don Quixote" at number 10. The album has been certified platinum by the British Phonographic Industry (BPI).

The album was re-released on 9 August 2013 on Universal Music Group's Re-presents imprint featuring rare bonus content. The reissue is a two-disc set with the original album digitally remastered from the original 1/2" mix tapes; the bonus content consists of associated B-sides, 12″ mixes, and live versions of the songs featured on the album.

== Cover artwork ==
The album's cover photograph was shot on Chesil Beach in Dorset, England. On the back sleeve of the album, the Isle of Portland is seen in the background. Additionally, the single release of the title song "The Riddle" used the same image of Kershaw on the beach, whilst the back sleeve featured a photograph of Kershaw reading a map, standing at Portland Bill. The Trinity House Obelisk is highlighted in the photograph.

== Critical reception ==
Smash Hits gave the album a mostly positive review calling it "a commendable offering from the thinking man's Limahl". Reviewing retrospectively for AllMusic, critic Scott Bultman wrote that the album "finally garnered some deserved attention. The rest is his unique style of well-crafted synth-pop."

== Track listing ==
All tracks are written by Nik Kershaw.

Side one
No.	Title	Length
1.	"Don Quixote"	4:55
2.	"Know How"	4:52
3.	"You Might"	3:17
4.	"Wild Horses"	3:59
5.	"Easy"	4:13

Side two
No.	Title	Length
6.	"The Riddle"	3:52
7.	"City of Angels"	3:56
8.	"Roses"	3:58
9.	"Wide Boy"	3:28
10.	"Save the Whale"	6:02
Total length:		42:32

=== US release ===
The US edition of the album reorders the track listing and replaces "City of Angels" with "Wouldn't It Be Good".

Side one
No.	Title	Length
1.	"The Riddle"	3:52
2.	"Know How"	4:49
3.	"You Might"	3:13
4.	"Don Quixote"	4:57
5.	"Easy"	4:12

Side two
No.	Title	Length
6.	"Wouldn't It Be Good"	4:10
7.	"Wide Boy"	3:19
8.	"Wild Horses"	3:58
9.	"Roses"	3:25
10.	"Save the Whale"	5:57

=== 2013 reissue ===
The track listing of the second disc is:

No.	Title	Length
1.	"Roses" (Live)	4:43
2.	"The Riddle" (Extended 12" Remix)	5:09
3.	"Know How" (Live)	4:53
4.	"Don Quixote" (Extra Special Long Mix)	8:42
5.	"City of Angels" (Live)	3:57
6.	"So Quiet"	3:11
7.	"Wild Horses" (Live)	3:57
8.	"Wide Boy" (Extended 12" Remix)	5:08
9.	"You Might" (Live)	3:28
10.	"Don't Lie"	3:52
11.	"Save the Whale" (Live)	6:04

All of the live tracks were recorded at the Hammersmith Odeon on New Year's Eve 1984.

The website SuperDeluxeEdition noted that the second disc had some notable absences, specifically "Progress (Live)", which was the B-side of "The Riddle", an extended mix of "Wild Horses", which had been on the 12" version of "When a Heart Beats", and the single edits of "Wide Boy" and "Don Quixote". Kershaw defended the omissions, calling "Progress" "a dodgy performance of a mediocre song, badly recorded". Of the "Wild Horses" extended mix, he commented:

The 12″ "Remix" of Wild Horses was never any such thing. It was cobbled together by MCA whilst I was away on tour and without my knowledge. It was created by editing together sections from the half inch master of the backing track with the half inch master of the album version. No "Remixing" whatsoever was involved and, as such, I considered it pointless, a fraud and not worthy of a place on this album.

He also noted that his choice of material was limited as master copies of certain items had gone missing in the intervening years.

== Personnel ==
Credits are adapted from the album's liner notes.

Musicians

- Nik Kershaw – lead and background vocals; vocal percussion; guitar; bass guitar; keyboards
- Paul "Wix" Wickens – Fairlight CMI programming; Oberheim DMX programming
- Tim Moore – keyboards (and acoustic piano on "So Quiet" (2013 re-release only)
- Andy Richards – keyboards
- Charlie Morgan – drums
- Dennis Smith – bass guitar
- Stuart Curtis – horns
- Dave Land – horns
- Pandit Dinesh – percussion
- Sheri Kershaw – backing vocals (and lead vocal on "Don't Lie" (2013 re-release only)
- Don Snow – backing vocals
- Mark King – special guest bass guitar on "Easy"

Production team

- Peter Collins – producer
- Julian Mendelsohn – engineer
- Dave Meegan – assistant engineer

Live personnel (2013 re-release)

- Nik Kershaw – vocals; guitar; keyboards
- Keith Airey – guitar; keyboards; backing vocals
- Tim Moore – keyboards; backing vocals
- Mark Price – drums
- Dennis Smith – bass guitar
- Gary Wallis – percussion

== Charts ==
=== Weekly charts ===
Weekly chart performance for The Riddle
Chart (1984–1985)	Peak position
Australian Albums (Kent Music Report)	39
Canada Top Albums/CDs (RPM)	45
Dutch Albums (Album Top 100)	21
European Albums (Music & Media)	13
Finnish Albums (Suomen virallinen lista)	11
German Albums (Offizielle Top 100)	12
New Zealand Albums (RMNZ)	8
Norwegian Albums (VG-lista)	5
Swedish Albums (Sverigetopplistan)	11
Swiss Albums (Schweizer Hitparade)	23
UK Albums (Official Charts)	8
US Billboard 200	113

=== Year-end charts ===
1984 year-end chart performance for The Riddle
Chart (1984)	Position
UK Albums (Gallup)	42

1985 year-end chart performance for The Riddle
Chart (1985)	Position
German Albums (Offizielle Top 100)	61
New Zealand Albums (RMNZ)	24
UK Albums (Gallup)	96

== Certifications ==
Certifications for The Riddle
Region	Certification	Certified units/sales
United Kingdom (BPI)	Platinum	300,000^{^}
^{^} Shipments figures based on certification alone.
