= Stevie Vann =

British singer

Stevie Vann Lange
- Also known as: Stevie Lange; Stevie Vann
- Born: Stevie van Kerken; Mufulira, Northern Rhodesia (now Zambia)
- Genres: Pop; rock; progressive rock
- Label: Silvertone
- Website: stevielange.com

Stevie Vann (born Stevie van Kerken), also known as Stevie Lange, is a Zambian-born British singer and vocal coach. She is best known for her work as a backing vocalist and studio singer for many groups and solo performers in the 1970s and 1980s. As lead vocalist for the group Night, she had two top 20 U.S. chart hits in the late 1970s.

== Biography ==
=== Early years ===
Stevie Vann was raised in Mufulira, Northern Rhodesia (now Zambia). She showed an early aptitude for music, playing piano by age six. Soon after turning 16 Stevie starred in her own television variety show and within a few years she had released two solo albums. In high demand as a radio and TV commercial jingle singer while still a teen, she also earned a "Sarie Award" as South Africa's Top Female Vocalist.

=== Professional career ===
Vann met Robert "Mutt" Lange when the two attended the same school in Mufulira, and the two reconnected a few years later while attending Belfast High School in South Africa. The two would play together in a short-lived band named Hocus, later marry and emigrate to the United Kingdom in the 1970s. Stevie Vann found work as a studio singer through the mid and latter part of the decade both on her own and as part of a backing group called "Bones". Among those acts she contributed vocals to were Bijelo Dugme, Sweet, Colin Blunstone, Jim Capaldi, Trevor Rabin, Rick Wakeman and UFO. In 1978 Vann met Chris Thompson while providing backing vocals for the album Watch by Manfred Mann's Earth Band. Shortly after Thompson invited her to be a part of Night, a new band he was forming.

Signed to Planet Records, Night recorded two albums with producer Richard Perry. The first, their self-titled 1979 debut, reached only #113 on the U.S. Billboard album charts but garnered a Top Twenty U.S. single. “Hot Summer Nights” peaked at #18 in the U.S. Top 40, while also becoming an international hit in Canada (#23), South Africa (#13) and elsewhere. Their second single, "If You Remember Me", was the theme song for the movie The Champ and reached #17 in the United States. Night also performed a song, "The Stripper", on screen in the 1980 horror film The Monster Club. The group's second album, 1980's Long Distance, was less successful and produced only one minor hit, "Love on the Airwaves". Night recorded no further albums and broke up in 1982.

Free of Night and divorced from Lange, Vann continued her career as a solo artist, backup singer, and commercial jingle singer. Among the more notable of her adverts in the United Kingdom were ad campaigns for Trio, a chocolate bar, and the feminine hygiene product Bodyform in the 1980s. Additionally, a slightly altered version of her minor 1981 solo hit Remember My Name was used in an advert for Limara body spray in the early 1980s. Her studio session work in the 1980s included backing vocals for acts like Wildhearts, Chaka Khan, Billy Ocean, Tears for Fears, Johnny Hates Jazz, Wham!, Swing Out Sister, Nik Kershaw, and Ray Charles. She also toured with Elton John for two years in the 1980s as a backing vocalist.

In 1995 Vann worked with ex-husband Mutt Lange on two projects. Despite their divorce years earlier the two remained good friends and musical collaborators. She sang backing vocals on Def Leppard's When Love & Hate Collide from Vault: Def Leppard Greatest Hits (1980–1995). Additionally in 1995 she recorded a self-titled solo album with Lange as producer. With backing musicians Dann Huff, Max Carl and Bob Carlisle and a duet with Bryan Adams, the album failed to garner chart success or hit singles.

Vann continues to work in the music industry. While occasionally performing as a backing singer, her career now is mostly focused on being a vocal coach. In that aspect she has provided assistance to many acts like Blue, Sophie Ellis-Bextor, Robbie Williams, Atomic Kitten and KT Tunstall.

== Discography ==
=== Album ===
- Stevie Vann (Silvertone Records, 1995)

=== Singles ===
- "Don't Want to Cry No More" (1979) - AUS #98
- "Remember My Name" (1981)
- "I'll Take Your Heart"
- "Without Your Love (I Can't Live)"

=== With Filthy McNasty ===
- "A Week At The Bridge E16 (Live 3 Tracks)" (Bridgehouse Records,1978)
