= Don Quixote (Nik Kershaw song) =

Single by Nik Kershaw

from the album The Riddle
- B-side: "Don't Lie"
- Released: 22 July 1985
- Recorded: 1984
- Genre: Pop rock; new wave
- Length: 4:55 (album version); 4:11 (single version); 8:41 (extended version)
- Label: MCA
- Songwriter: Nik Kershaw
- Producer: Peter Collins

Nik Kershaw singles chronology
"Wide Boy" (1985)	"Don Quixote" (1985)	"When a Heart Beats" (1985)

Music video
- "Don Quixote" on YouTube

"Don Quixote" is a song by the English singer Nik Kershaw from his second studio album The Riddle (1984). Released in July 1985 by MCA Records as the final single from that album, it reached No. 10 on the UK singles chart in September 1985. It also became Kershaw's seventh (and last) consecutive UK top 20 hit single.

Nine days before "Don Quixote" was released as a single, it was the second of four songs played by Kershaw at Live Aid. The others were previous singles "The Riddle", "Wouldn't It Be Good" and "Wide Boy".

== Background ==
While discussing his method of writing lyrics, Kershaw explained the song's origins in the January 1986 issue of monthly music technology magazine Sound on Sound.

The lyric that ended up as 'Don Quixote', was actually 'Gorgonzola'! So I was walking about the house singing 'gor-gon-zola' all day long, trying to think of a lyric. Basically the music was a sort of Samba thing, which reminded me of Spain, and Don Quixote happened to come to mind so I thought, 'Why not write a song about Don Quixote ?'. So I went and bought the book.

The music video was directed by the English art director Storm Thorgerson of Hipgnosis fame.

== Track listing ==
7" single (WEA NIK 8)
A. "Don Quixote" – 4:11
B. "Don't Lie" – 3:52

12" single (WEA NIKT 8)
A. "Don Quixote" (Extra Special Long Mix) – 8:41
B. "Don't Lie" – 3:52

== Chart performance ==
Chart (1985)	Peak position
Australia (Kent Music Report)	83
German Media Control Charts	39
Irish Singles Chart	9
New Zealand Singles Chart	36
UK singles chart	10
