= Somebody Loves You (Nik Kershaw song) =

Single by Nik Kershaw

from the album 15 Minutes
- B-side: "The Wrong Man"; "Woman"
- Released: 15 February 1999
- Genre: Pop rock
- Length: 5:02 (album version); 3:59 (single version)
- Label: Eagle
- Songwriter: Nik Kershaw
- Producer: Nik Kershaw

Nik Kershaw singles chronology
"Wouldn't It Be Good (re-issue)" (1998)	"Somebody Loves You" (1999)	"What Do You Think of It So Far?" (1999)

"Somebody Loves You" is a song by the English singer-songwriter Nik Kershaw, which was released in 1999 as the lead single from his fifth studio album 15 Minutes. The song was written and produced by Kershaw. "Somebody Loves You" reached No. 70 in the UK singles chart.

== Background ==
Speaking to Amanda Cagan and Melissa Sprawl in 1999, Kershaw said of the song's message, "When you're up on stage, it feels like there's so much love coming off the audience. While it's good to experience that, you have to remember it's not for you, but something being projected onto you. You can enjoy it while it's happening, but it's very dangerous if you start believing it." He expanded further in a 1998 interview with Kuno On Line, "[The song is] about being on stage and being famous. It's a negative look on what you get when you are famous, and when I was famous. I became the person I was playing in publicity. You know, you walk into a room. You didn't have to try too hard. Everyone knew who you were. It's just the images and pictures for me of that time, when I was onstage and saw the faces singing all those songs back to me. It was weird. And the chorus, 'Somebody Loves You', that's really what it feels like. There is all this love coming back towards you. You have stop and think, 'How much of that is really you?' You aren't what they think you are."

== Critical reception ==
On its release, Music Week considered "Somebody Loves You" "worth of attention" and added, "While it's not quite 'Wouldn't It Be Good', underneath there is the kind of strong song so often lacking from the Nineties' charts." James O'Brian of the Daily Express described the song as "an anthem to the power of affection" which "could well propel him back into the charts". Chuck Taylor of Billboard praised the song as an "easy-flowing, highly melodic tune" and remarked, "Kershaw sounds youthful and up to the minute here, capitalizing on a beautiful, harmony-enriched chorus, moody organs, and guitars that guide this track like an instrumental beacon." He concluded, "This is a great little tune, well-constructed and adeptly delivered."

== Formats ==
CD Single (UK Part 1)

1. "Somebody Loves You" (Single Edit) – 3:59
2. "Wouldn't It Be Good" ('99 Acoustic)
3. "The Riddle" (Acoustic – Live)

CD Single (UK Part 2)

1. "Somebody Loves You" (Radio Edit) – 3:59
2. "The Wrong Man" – 5:15
3. "Woman" – 4:25

CD Single (UK Promo Acetate CD-R)

1. "Somebody Loves You" (Single Edit) – 3:59

CD Single (US Promo)

1. "Somebody Loves You" – 3:56
2. "Wouldn't It Be Good" (New Acoustic Version)
3. "The Riddle" (Live)

== Personnel ==
- Nik Kershaw – vocals, producer
- Dave Bronze – bass
- Steve Washington – drums, percussion
- Mark "Tuffty" Evans – mixing
- Tony Cousins – mastering

== Charts ==
Chart (1999)	Peak position
UK singles chart	70
