= Wix Wickens =

British musician (born 1956)

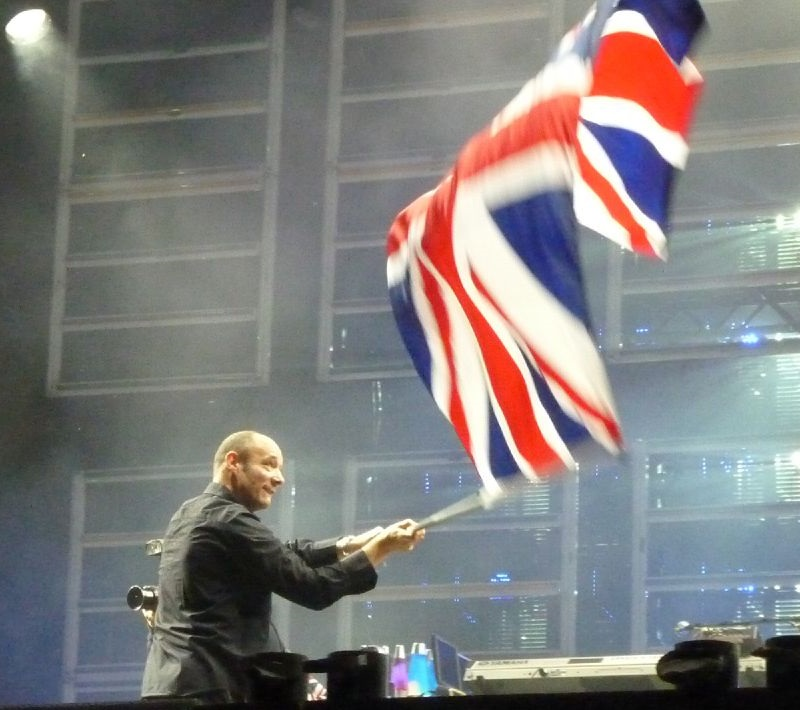
- Wickens at RDS Arena in Dublin, Ireland, in 2010

Background information
- Born: Paul Wickens; 27 March 1956 (age 70); Brentwood, Essex, England
- Occupations: Musician, producer
- Instrument: Keyboards
- Years active: 1973–present

Paul "Wix" Wickens (born 27 March 1956) is an English musician best known as keyboardist and musical director of Paul McCartney's touring band since 1989. In a career that started in 1973, Wickens has also worked with artists including Nik Kershaw, Bob Dylan, Joni Mitchell, Bon Jovi, Edie Brickell, Kevin Coyne, David Gilmour and many others.

== Early life ==
Wickens attended Brentwood School, Essex where he became a friend of fellow student Douglas Adams. Wickens composed the music for the sequel radio productions of Adams's The Hitchhiker's Guide to the Galaxy Tertiary to Quintessential Phases and performed at his memorial service in 2001.

== Career ==
In the early 1980s Wickens was a member of Woodhead Monroe, a band that issued two singles distributed by Stiff, "Mumbo Jumbo" and "Identify".

Wickens began touring with Paul McCartney in 1989. Since then, Wickens has served as the musical director for many of McCartney's tours. He continues to tour with McCartney (as his keyboardist, occasional guitarist and backing vocalist), and is the longest serving of the four musicians in McCartney's touring band.

Wickens played on albums by Tommy Shaw of the American rock band Styx, the Damned, Tim Finn, Paul Carrack, Nik Kershaw, Jim Diamond, Boy George, and David Gilmour, and was the co-producer of the first Savage Progress album. He also was the keyboardist and programmer for Edie Brickell & New Bohemians album, Shooting Rubberbands at the Stars – which was where he first met Chris Whitten. Wickens was also involved in making the 2008 album Bandaged in aid of BBC Children in Need.

Wickens played accordion on The The's minor UK hit "This Is the Day" from their album Soul Mining. He also recorded a version of Nirvana's "Smells Like Teen Spirit".

== Selected discography ==
=== Music producer ===
Year	Album	Artist
1986	Desire for Freedom	Jim Diamond
1988	Creeping Up on Jesus	The Big Dish
1992	Sleeping Satellite	Tasmin Archer
1992	Great Expectations	Tasmin Archer
1993	In Your Care	Tasmin Archer
1996	Big White Room	Melanie Garside
1996	She Knows	Melanie Garside

=== Performer ===
Year	Album	Artist
1978	Dynamite Daze	Kevin Coyne
1978	Millionaires and Teddy Bears	Kevin Coyne
1979	Babble	Kevin Coyne and Dagmar Krause
1983	"All I See Is You"	Eddie and Sunshine
1983	"Do What You Wanna Do" / "Movin' On"	Chris Thompson
1983	"Perfect Stranger"	Eddie and Sunshine
1983	The Golden Section	John Foxx
1983	Soul Mining	The The
1984	Human Racing	Nik Kershaw
1984	Un autre monde	Téléphone
1984	The Riddle	Nik Kershaw
1984	The Bad and Lowdown World of the Kane Gang	Kane Gang
1985	In Mysterious Ways	John Foxx
1986	"Hi Ho Silver"	Jim Diamond
1986	Radio Musicola	Nik Kershaw
1986	Big Canoe	Tim Finn
1986	Get Close	The Pretenders
1987	Blue Slipper	Helen Watson
1987	American English	Wax
1987	Ambition	Tommy Shaw
1987	To Be Reborn	Boy George
1988	Ain't Complaining	Status Quo
1988	What Up, Dog?	Was (Not Was)
1988	From Langley Park to Memphis	Prefab Sprout
1988	Creeping Up on Jesus	The Big Dish
1989	One Good Reason	Paul Carrack
1989	Gatecrashing	Living in a Box
1989	The Works	Nik Kershaw
1989	Flowers in the Dirt	Paul McCartney
1989	Mind Bomb	The The
1990	Stolen Moments	John Hiatt
1990	Other Voices	Paul Young
1990	Tripping the Live Fantastic	Paul McCartney
1991	Places I Have Never Been	Willie Nile
1993	Off the Ground	Paul McCartney
1993	Paul Is Live	Paul McCartney
1996	Big White Room	Melanie Garside
1996	Desire for Freedom	Jim Diamond
1997	So Help Me Girl	Gary Barlow
2002	Back in the US/Back in the World	Paul McCartney
2003	Seven Years – Ten Weeks	David Sneddon
2007	Memory Almost Full	Paul McCartney
2009	Good Evening New York City	Paul McCartney
2013	New	Paul McCartney
2018	Egypt Station	Paul McCartney
