= Ei8ht (album) =

Studio album by Nik Kershaw
- Released: 6 August 2012
- Length: 49:04
- Label: Shorthouse
- Producer: Nik Kershaw

Nik Kershaw chronology
No Frills (2010)	Ei8ht (2012)	Oxymoron (2020)

Ei8ht is the eighth studio album by the English singer-songwriter Nik Kershaw, released on his independent label Shorthouse Records in 2012. The album reached No. 91 on the UK Albums Chart and No. 12 on the UK Independent Albums Chart.

== Background ==
Kershaw started working on the album in early 2011. Speaking to The Evening Times in 2012, he said: "I sat down about 18 months ago and decided it was time to make another [album]. I have to do that every now and again to get it out my system."

Two singles were released from the album. A radio version of "The Sky's The Limit" was released in August, with a music video for the song premiering on YouTube on 4 August. It was directed by Steve Price and was filmed at Armagh Observatory and Armagh Planetarium, Northern Ireland, and Haytor, Dartmoor. The second and final single, "You're the Best", was released in September.

"The Sky's the Limit" was featured in the 2016 biographical film Eddie the Eagle and appeared on its soundtrack release, Fly.

== Critical reception ==
Professional ratings
Review scores
Source	Rating
musicOMH	3.5/5 stars
The Scotsman	1/5 stars

Upon release, Ben Hogwood of musicOMH wrote: "Good songwriters don't usually lose their knack overnight, and Kershaw proves that as he gets on this particular bike once more. Many of the songs grow in to earworms, which by the third or fourth listen are burned in to the consciousness." Fiona Shepherd of The Scotsman stated: "In less conservative hands, this desperately dull MOR pop album might yield an insipid hit or two, but Kershaw's arrangements drain the life from the songs."

== Track listing ==
All tracks are written by Nik Kershaw.

Ei8ht track listing
No.	Title	Length
1.	"These Tears"	3:51
2.	"The Sky's the Limit"	4:12
3.	"Runaway"	3:54
4.	"Shoot Me"	4:36
5.	"Bad Day You're Having"	4:12
6.	"Red Strand"	4:23
7.	"Enjoy the Ride"	4:12
8.	"You're the Best"	4:21
9.	"Stuff"	3:32
10.	"Rock of Ages"	4:34
11.	"The Bell"	3:48
12.	"The Sky's the Limit (Radio Version)"	3:29
Total length:		49:04

== Personnel ==
Musicians

- Nik Kershaw – vocals, guitar, keyboards, programming
- Robbie Bronnimann – keyboards
- Jon-Willy Rydningen – piano (tracks 2, 6)
- Ric Sanders – fiddle (track 6)
- Geese – strings
- Paul Geary – bass
- Eirik Rydningen – drums
- Chesney Hawkes, Keely Hawkes, Shaz Sparks – backing vocals (track 12)

Production

- Nik Kershaw – producer, arranger, programming
- Robbie Bronnimann – programming, additional production (track 12), mixing (track 12)
- Eirik Rydningen – mixing (track 8)
- Mark Evans – mixing (track 1)

== Charts ==
Chart performance for Ei8ht
Chart (2012)	Peak position
UK Albums Chart	91
UK Independent Albums Chart	12
