= 15 Minutes (Nik Kershaw album) =

Studio album by Nik Kershaw
- Released: 6 April 1999
- Recorded: 1998
- Studios: Shorthouse Studios; Wessex Sound Studios, Highbury, London; The Church Studios, Crouch End, London
- Genre: Britpop
- Length: 56:51
- Labels: Rhino; Eagle
- Producer: Nik Kershaw

Nik Kershaw chronology
The Best of Nik Kershaw (1993)	15 Minutes (1999)	The Essential (2000)

15 Minutes is the fifth studio album by the English singer-songwriter Nik Kershaw, released on 6 April 1999.

== Background ==
In a 2008 interview, Kershaw spoke of two tracks from the album after being asked for his proudest song.

"'Billy' would be my finest lyric. Lyrics usually take me days or even weeks but this was one of those rare occasions when they just poured out and everything fell into place. It has a complex rhyming scheme but still manages to make a point with humour. There's another song on the same album called 'Have a Nice Life' which is very simple and heartfelt. Again, that was quick and easy to write. The best ones always are and you spend most of your creative life trying to find them. The trouble is they find you and not the other way around."

== Critical reception ==
Professional ratings
Review scores
Source	Rating
AllMusic	3/5 stars
The Tennessean	3.5/5 stars

Stephen Thomas Erlewine of AllMusic described the album as an "immaculately produced collection of modern mature pop", but felt the album concentrated too much on "sonic texture" rather than the songwriting. He concluded: "It's easy to admire the craft behind the production and the subtle songwriting, even if the songs don't work their way into your subconscious." Tom Roland of The Tennessean wrote: "Kershaw delivers 15 Minutes with a Brit boy-next-door disposition and a bed of guitars, in a swirl of restrained, midtempo pop." Dana Tofig of the Hartford Courant commented: "Kershaw has put out a new album that testifies he should have received much more time in the spotlight. 15 Minutes, although inconsistent, is filled with catchy pop songs that stand out with brilliant hooks and a touch of oddness."

== Track listing ==
All tracks are written by Nik Kershaw.

No.	Title	Length
1.	"Somebody Loves You"	5:02
2.	"Have a Nice Life"	3:58
3.	"Billy"	4:20
4.	"Find Me an Angel"	5:55
5.	"Your Brave Face"	5:50
6.	"What Do You Think of It So Far?"	3:56
7.	"God Bless"	4:24
8.	"Stick Around"	3:48
9.	"Fiction"	4:18
10.	"Made in Heaven"	5:56
11.	"Shine On"	4:54
12.	"15 Minutes"	4:39
13.	"Wouldn't It Be Good" (bonus track)	5:01
Total length:		56:51

== Personnel ==
- Nik Kershaw – vocals, guitars, keyboards, programming
- Dave Bronze, Paul Geary – bass
- Steve Washington – drums, percussion
- Arden Hart – Hammond organ on "Billy" and "What Do You Think of It So Far?"
- Tony Hinnigan – whistle on "Stick Around"
- Jethro East – programming on "Find Me an Angel" and "Made in Heaven"

Technical

- Stephen Lipson – additional production and mixing on "Have a Nice Life" and "Stick Around"
- John Carver, Paul Spencer – art direction

== Singles ==
- "Somebody Loves You" No. 70
  - B-side (standard edition) – "Wouldn't It Be Good" (acoustic), "The Riddle" (acoustic)
    - B-side (limited edition) – "The Wrong Man", "Woman"
- "What Do You Think of It So Far"
  - B-side – "Oxygen" (acoustic), "Woman"
