= Human Racing (song) =

Single by Nik Kershaw

from the album Human Racing
- B-side: "Faces", "Cloak and Dagger", "Drum Talk", "Wouldn't It Be Good"
- Released: 3 September 1984
- Genre: Synth-pop; new wave
- Length: 4:26 (album version); 4:28 (single version); 5:30 (extended version)
- Label: MCA
- Songwriter: Nik Kershaw
- Producer: Peter Collins

Nik Kershaw singles chronology
"I Won't Let the Sun Go Down on Me (re-issue)" (1984)	"Human Racing" (1984)	"The Riddle" (1984)

"Human Racing" is a song by the English singer-songwriter Nik Kershaw. It was the title track for his hit debut studio album of the same name, released in September 1984 by MCA Records. It was the fourth hit single from the album, reaching No. 19 on the UK Singles Chart. It entered the chart in the week ending 15 September 1984, and remained within for seven weeks. An earlier version of the song, titled "Look Behind You", appeared on the studio album Till I Hear from You (1980) by Fusion, a band with Kershaw on lead vocals and guitar.

== Track listings ==
7" single (WEA NIK 5)

A "Human Racing" – 4:28
B "Faces" (remix) – 4:40

7" double single (WEA NIKD 5)
Gatefold with the "Human Racing board game" printed on the fold out

A "Human Racing" – 4:28
B "Faces" (remix) – 4:40
C "Cloak and Dagger" (live) – 5:10
D "Drum Talk" (live) – 4:05

12" single (WEA NIKT 5)

A "Human Racing" (remix) – 5:30
B "Faces" (remix) – 4:40

12" single (WEA NIKX 5)

A "Human Racing" (remix) – 5:30
B "Wouldn't It Be Good" (remix) – 7:50

== Credits ==
"Human Racing"

Produced by Peter Collins

"Faces" (remix)

Produced by Peter Collins
Special Remix by Simon Boswell

"Cloak and Dagger" (live)

Recorded live at the Hammersmith Odeon
Mixed and Engineered by Simon Boswell

"Drum Talk" (live)

Recorded live at the Hammersmith Odeon
Mixed and Engineered by Simon Boswell

"Human Racing" (remix)

Produced by Peter Collins
Special Extended Mix by Simon Boswell

"Wouldn't It Be Good" (remix)

Produced by Peter Collins
Remix by Simon Boswell

== Chart performance ==
Chart (1984)	Peak position
Irish Singles Chart	17
UK Singles Chart	19
