= Sheri Kershaw =

Canadian singer-songwriter

- Born: Sheri Pogmore; 1953 (age 72–73); Pickering, Ontario, Canada
- Genres: Folk; blues
- Occupations: Singer-songwriter; musician
- Instruments: Vocals; guitar
- Years active: 1970–present
- Spouse: Nik Kershaw (m. 1983; div. 2003)
- Website: sherikershaw.com

Sheri Kershaw (born Sheri Pogmore in 1953) is a Canadian singer-songwriter. From 1983 to 2003 she was married to Nik Kershaw. She toured extensively with him and sang backing vocals on his early albums, achieving a No. 3 singles hit with his song "The Riddle".

== Early years ==
Sheri Kershaw's parents were from Birmingham, England, and she was born in Pickering, Ontario, Canada. When she was 13, her cousin Robert came to visit from England and introduced her to the guitar and songwriting. She took over her brother's guitar and went to work learning to play. She took lessons briefly, but in 1969 her parents returned to England and enrolled her in secretarial school, which they felt was more respectable than a career in music.

== Career ==
In 1970, Kershaw left home and joined a band with English musician Robbie Gladwell, playing with him in a duo. They later formed a folk band with Ken Elson and Trevor Martin called Sine Nomine, where they wrote and played their own songs. From folk rock festivals in the Colchester/Ipswich area they went on to play in Turkey and tour Germany. During and after her break-up with Gladwell, Kershaw broadened her experience singing in a dinner dance band and in a jazz quartet. Subsequently she moved on to work in cabaret in the North where she met Bruce Hamill when he joined the band she was in, on keyboards.

In 1979, she lost her voice and took Bel canto lessons to recover it with Jean Marshall (who also had Linda Lewis as one of her students). At the end of 1979, after her voice had recovered, she met and started to live with Nik Kershaw when he joined the band Fusion in which she was already singing. Supporting Nik with what little money they had to make an album of his songs and place an advertisement in Melody Maker, their life of fame began. Sheri toured with him in his band the Krew and worked on three of his albums. The band's album The Riddle reached No. 8 on the UK Albums Chart and was certified Platinum, while the lead single of the same name reached No. 3 on the UK Singles Chart.

After marrying Kershaw, Sheri took time off from her music career to have children and certified as a teacher for disabled children. She also trained and worked as a psychotherapist and a vocal therapist. At about the age of 40, Kershaw picked up songwriting again. After the final break up of their marriage, she formed a band with Martyn Hewitt and Chris Brimley based in Braintree, Essex, and has released two albums.

== Personal life ==
Sheri Kershaw married Robbie Gladwell in 1970, but they later divorced. While working in cabaret she met American musician and composer Bruce Hamill and was married to him for several years, separating in 1979 and divorcing in 1980. Her third husband was the English singer-songwriter Nik Kershaw. The couple married in July 1983 and had three children together. They divorced in 2003.

For many years, Kershaw has been a member of the School of Economic Science group which promotes meditation. It has a dress code and advocates a conservative lifestyle, with traditional gender roles and sexual mores. She was also a member of the Gurdjieff group, and subsequently became a Buddhist.

== Discography ==
Solo

- Blue Pillows (2001)

The Sheri Kershaw Band

- Kettles in the Kitchen' (2011)
