= Dancing Girls (song) =

Single by Nik Kershaw

from the album Human Racing
- B-side: "Drum Talk, She Cries"
- Released: 2 April 1984
- Recorded: Summer 1983
- Genre: Synth-pop; new wave
- Length: 3:46 (album version); 3:36 (single remix); 8:00 (extended version)
- Label: MCA
- Songwriter: Nik Kershaw
- Producer: Peter Collins

Nik Kershaw singles chronology
"Wouldn't It Be Good" (1984)	"Dancing Girls" (1984)	"I Won't Let the Sun Go Down on Me (re-issue)" (1984)

Music video
- "Dancing Girls" on YouTube

"Dancing Girls" is a song by the English singer-songwriter Nik Kershaw. It was the third single from his debut studio album, Human Racing, and released on 2 April 1984 by MCA Records. It charted on 14 April 1984, and reaching a peak position of No. 13 in the UK singles chart. It stayed on the charts for nine weeks.

== Music and lyrics ==
Kershaw explained the song to Number One magazine in September 1984:

"Dancing Girls" is about a bloke a bit down on his luck. He's got a job and everything but he's bored sick with the routine of getting up, going to work, coming home, watching the telly, going to bed ... in the end he's saying, "For God's sake, bring on the dancing girls! Let something exciting happen to me for a change." But again the idea was exaggerated.

In a 2012 podcast interview with Sodajerker, Kershaw remembers writing the bassline spontaneously on a Roland Juno-6 synthesizer, using the arpeggiator function, and programming a rhythm on a Roland TR-808 drum machine – it was to this musical basis that the lyrics would be written.

== Music video ==
The external street scenes for the music video for "Dancing Girls" were filmed in the dead-end section of Woodberry Grove, Finchley, North London. It depicted Kershaw as the subject of the song's lyrics, an advertising executive, imagining himself dancing with a group of middle aged dancers, including a six foot tall traffic warden, deliberately juxtaposed against Kershaw's 5'3" (160 cm) frame. The video was intended to be light-hearted, following on from the much darker video for Kershaw's previous single, "Wouldn't It Be Good".

== Track listing ==
7" Single (MCA NIK 3)

A "Dancing Girls" (Remixed Version) – 3:36
B "She Cries" – 3:45

12" Single (MCA NIKT 3)
There were four different UK 12" releases for "Dancing Girls", all sharing the same catalogue number

== Charts ==
Chart	Position	Weeks in Chart
UK singles chart	13	10
Irish Singles Chart	2	4
German Media Control Charts	21	1

== Critical reception ==
Reviewer Paul Sinclair of website "Super Deluxe Edition" said of the song:

...third single "Dancing Girls" is an outstanding piece of pure electro/synth pop that walks in the shadow of little in that era.

Lisa Kalloo of Somojo2 said:

Dancing Girls captures the essence of teenybopping yesteryears. Is it any wonder that the likes of Eric Clapton held Nik in high esteem? Nope, because this is a classic example of British synthy-pop at its best.
