= Wide Boy (song) =

Single by Nik Kershaw

from the album The Riddle
- B-side: "Shame on You"; "So Quiet"
- Released: 4 March 1985
- Recorded: 1983–1984
- Genre: Pop rock; new wave
- Length: 3:28 (album version); 3:19 (single remix); 5:07 (extended version)
- Label: MCA
- Songwriter: Nik Kershaw
- Producer: Peter Collins

Nik Kershaw singles chronology
| "The Riddle" (1984) | "Wide Boy" (1985) | "Don Quixote" (1985) |

Music video
- "Wide Boy" on YouTube

"Wide Boy" is a song by the English singer-songwriter Nik Kershaw. It was his sixth consecutive top-20 single, peaking at No. 9 on the UK singles chart in 1985. It was followed by "Don Quixote" which was to become the last of his string of top-20 singles on the UK chart. "Wide Boy" also charted highly in Ireland and Australia, peaking at No. 5 and No. 7, respectively.

A version of the song was originally recorded for Kershaw's debut studio album Human Racing, but was dropped before the album was released. It later appeared on Kershaw's next studio album The Riddle in partially re-recorded form. He remarked that the song was "an old song, probably four or five years old" by that point. The single was a remix of the album version.

The accompanying music video was directed by the art director Storm Thorgerson.

== Track listings ==
7" single (WEA NIK 7)
A. "Wide Boy" (Remix) – 3:19
B. "So Quiet" – 3:12

12" single (WEA NIKT 7)
A. "Wide Boy" (Extended Mix) – 5:07
B1. "Shame on You" (Remix) – 3:39
B2. "So Quiet" – 3:07

== Credits ==
"Wide Boy (Remix)"
Produced by Peter Collins
Remixed by Gary Langan and Nik Kershaw

"So Quiet"
Produced by Nik Kershaw
Piano accompaniment: Nik Kershaw

"Wide Boy (Extended Mix)"
Produced by Peter Collins
Extended mix by Nik Kershaw

"Shame on You (Remix)"
Produced by Peter Collins

== Charts ==
=== Weekly charts ===
Weekly chart performance for "Wide Boy"
| Chart (1985) | Peak position |
|---|---|
| Australia (Kent Music Report) | 7 |
| Belgium (Ultratop 50 Flanders) | 34 |
| Europe (European Top 100 Singles) | 10 |
| Ireland (IRMA) | 5 |
| Netherlands (Dutch Top 40 Tipparade) | 5 |
| Netherlands (Single Top 100) | 47 |
| New Zealand (Recorded Music NZ) | 21 |
| South Africa (Springbok Radio) | 27 |
| UK Singles (Official Charts) | 9 |
| West Germany (GfK) | 25 |

==== Year-end charts ====
Year-end chart performance for "Wide Boy"
| Chart (1985) | Position |
|---|---|
| Australia (Kent Music Report) | 95 |
