= When a Heart Beats =

1985 single by Nik Kershaw

Single by Nik Kershaw

from the album Radio Musicola (CD and Cassette versions only)
- B-side: "Wild Horses"
- Released: 18 November 1985
- Genre: Pop rock; new wave; synth-pop
- Length: 4:30 (album version); 4:20 (single version); 6:21 (extended version)
- Label: MCA
- Songwriter: Nik Kershaw
- Producer: Nik Kershaw

Nik Kershaw singles chronology
"Don Quixote" (1985)	"When a Heart Beats" (1985)	"Nobody Knows" (1986)

Music video
- "When a Heart Beats" on YouTube

"When a Heart Beats" is a song by the English singer-songwriter Nik Kershaw, released as the lead single from his third studio album, Radio Musicola (1986)—although the song does not appear on the LP version of the album, only on the cassette and CD editions. Kershaw's eighth single overall, it features the track "Wild Horses"—which was originally included on his previous studio album, The Riddle (1984)—as its B-side.

== Background ==
Though it reached number 27 on the UK singles chart towards the end of 1985, "When a Heart Beats" marked the beginning of a downturn of Kershaw's fortunes on the singles charts, as it was the first time that a lead single from a Kershaw album failed to reach the top 20 in the UK; it also proved to be his last top-40 entry in the UK.

== Track listings ==
- 7-inch single (MCA NIK 9)

A. "When a Heart Beats" – 4:20
B. "Wild Horses" – 3:50

- 12-inch single (MCA NIKT 9)

A. "When a Heart Beats" (Extended Mix) – 6:21
B. "Wild Horses" (Extended Mix) – 6:48

== Charts ==
Chart performance for "When a Heart Beats"
Chart (1985–1986)	Peak position
Australia (Kent Music Report)	92
Europe (European Hot 100 Singles)	76
Finland (Suomen virallinen lista)	21
Ireland (IRMA)	14
UK Singles (OCC)	27
West Germany (GfK)	55
