= I Won't Let the Sun Go Down on Me =

1983 single by Nik Kershaw

- Original release cover

Single by Nik Kershaw

from the album Human Racing
- B-side: "Dark Glasses"
- Released: 9 September 1983
- Genre: Synth-pop
- Length: 3:23 (album version); 3:19 (single version); 6:00 (extended version)
- Label: MCA
- Songwriter: Nik Kershaw
- Producer: Peter Collins

Nik Kershaw singles chronology
"I Won't Let the Sun Go Down on Me" (1983)	"Wouldn't It Be Good" (1984)
"Dancing Girls" (1984)	"I Won't Let the Sun Go Down on Me (re-issue)" (1984)	"Human Racing" (1984)

Music video
- "I Won't Let the Sun Go Down on Me" on YouTube

"I Won't Let the Sun Go Down on Me" is a song by the English singer-songwriter Nik Kershaw from his debut studio album, Human Racing (1984). It was his first single, released on 9 September 1983 by MCA Records to limited success. When re-released on 4 June 1984, the song became Kershaw's highest-charting single on the UK singles chart, peaking at number two. It features the non-album track "Dark Glasses" as the B-side, which was also released as a bonus track on the 2012 re-release of the album.

== Release ==
"I Won't Let the Sun Go Down on Me" was originally released on 9 September 1983 by MCA Records. After a lack of success, it was then re-released and/or re-promoted in November 1983 with a new sleeve, whereupon it entered the charts. However, despite spending eight weeks in the UK top 100, it only reached number 47. Then, after the top-five success of the follow-up single, "Wouldn't It Be Good", and a further Top 20 entry with "Dancing Girls", "I Won't Let the Sun Go Down on Me" was re-released in June 1984 and soared to number two. It was also subsequently a commercial success in several other countries and was responsible for bringing Kershaw to greater public attention.

During an appearance on BBC One's The One Show in June 2015, Pete Waterman of Stock Aitken Waterman (SAW) claimed he produced the record. Kershaw took to social media to point out that "I Won't Let the Sun Go Down on Me" was in fact produced by Peter Collins, who is credited on all releases as the record's sole producer. (Waterman managed Collins at the time the song was recorded, but had no involvement in the actual production of the track.)

== Lyrics ==
The song was written during the latter part of the Cold War period when nuclear war between the two superpowers of the Soviet Union and United States was still a very real concern, and the lyrics reflect a satirical view of politics and the threat of war with lines such as: "old men in stripey trousers, rule the world with plastic smiles", and: "forefinger on the button, is he blue or is he red?"

In September 1984, Kershaw told Number One magazine:

It's probably not immediately obvious but "I Won't Let the Sun" is about The Bomb, or rather about people taking responsibility for what they do generally. It's saying that it probably won't do much good for one person to shout about these things but I'm going to anyway.

== Musical arrangement ==
The song was originally written as a folk protest song, but as Kershaw's manager had signed him up to Peter Collins and Pete Waterman's Loose Ends production company, it turned into a pop anthem in the studio.

In Kershaw's version, the synth tune was produced with an Oberheim OB-8 played by Paul "Wix" Wickens.

== Music video ==
There are two different music videos for the song.

=== First release ===
The original video for "I Won't Let the Sun Go Down on Me" shows Kershaw singing the song on a hillside and in a castle. He is accompanied by children, and by a minstrel, who plays the guitar parts on a lute. The video was filmed at Allington Castle in Allington, Kent.

=== Second release ===
When the song was re-released in June 1984, a new video was shot. Because Kershaw was doing promotional work in Europe, there was little time to arrange anything, so a faux live video was shot. It was interspersed with occasional shots of the old men in stripey trousers, including actor Fred Evans. At one point, one of the old men picks a blue rabbit out of a guitar case. This had been sent to Kershaw by a fan named Lauren, and he placed it on stage in front of his right hand monitor during gigs, for luck. Kershaw was not happy with the video, feeling it was hurried:

I'll never forget the day of the shot, it was a real pandemonium. The band was trying to rehearse -'cos we hadn't played live for so long - and do the video at the same time. It would've been a much better video if we'd had more time. The best way to shoot a live gig is over four or five nights then you might get a good set because when you're playing live, there's a lot of excitement and you can't always concentrate on every note.

== Track listings ==
=== Original release ===
- 7-inch single (MCA 816)

A. "I Won't Let the Sun Go Down on Me" – 3:19
B. "Dark Glasses" – 4:15

- 12-inch single (MCAT 816)

A. "I Won't Let the Sun Go Down on Me" (Extended Dance Mix) – 6:00
B. "Dark Glasses" – 4:20

=== Re-release ===
- 7-inch single (MCA NIK 4)

A. "I Won't Let the Sun Go Down on Me" – 3:19
B. "Dark Glasses" – 4:12

- 12-inch single (MCA NIKT 4)

A. "I Won't Let the Sun Go Down on Me" (Extended Remix) – 6:35
B. "Dark Glasses" – 4:12

== Charts ==
=== Weekly charts ===
Weekly chart performance for "I Won't Let the Sun Go Down on Me" (original release)
Chart (1983)	Peak position
UK Singles (Official Charts)	47

Weekly chart performance for "I Won't Let the Sun Go Down on Me" (re-release)
Chart (1984)	Peak position
Australia (Kent Music Report)	17
Belgium (Ultratop 50 Flanders)	5
Canada Top Singles (RPM)	94
Denmark (IFPI)	3
Europe (European Top 100 Singles)	8
Finland (Suomen virallinen lista)	26
Ireland (IRMA)	4
Netherlands (Dutch Top 40)	6
Netherlands (Single Top 100)	5
Norway (VG-lista)	8
Sweden (Sverigetopplistan)	10
Switzerland (Schweizer Hitparade)	6
UK Singles (Official Charts)	2
West Germany (GfK)	12

=== Year-end charts ===
Year-end chart performance for "I Won't Let the Sun Go Down on Me"
Chart (1984)	Position
Belgium (Ultratop 50 Flanders)	52
Netherlands (Dutch Top 40)	58
Netherlands (Single Top 100)	56
UK Singles (Gallup)	34

== Certifications ==
Region	Certification	Certified units/sales
Denmark (IFPI Danmark)	Gold	45,000^{‡}
^{‡} Sales+streaming figures based on certification alone.

== Robin Cook version ==
"I Won't Let the Sun Go Down"

Single by Robin Cook

from the album Land of Sunshine
- B-side: "Reggae in the Night"
- Released: June 1996
- Genre: Reggae fusion
- Length: 3:20
- Label: Stockholm
- Songwriter: Nik Kershaw

Robin Cook singles chronology
"I Won't Let the Sun Go Down" (1996)	"Comanchero" (1997)

Official audio
- "I Won't Let the Sun Go Down" on YouTube

The Swedish record producer and singer Jonas Ekfeldt recorded a cover version of the song as Robin Cook in 1996, under the title "I Won't Let the Sun Go Down", which was later included on his debut and sole studio album Land of Sunshine (1997). The song charted in Sweden for 19 weeks in 1996, peaking at number three, and in Finland for two weeks, peaking at number 16.

=== Sampled by Sveriges Radio ===
Ekfeldt filed a lawsuit against Sveriges Radio for sampling "I Won't Let the Sun Go Down" and accused them for using the sample without permission in the parody song "I Won't Let Susan Go Down on Me" on the album Rally 2 from the radio programme Rally on the channel SR P3. Sveriges Radio denied the accusations, but the Swedish National Laboratory of Forensic Science compared the songs and asserted that the former song indeed had been sampled.

The amount of Ekfeldt's compensation was not made public, but was said to be of a significant amount and a lot more than if the channel had asked for permission first.

=== Track listing ===
- European CD single
1. "I Won't Let the Sun Go Down" (Radio Edit) – 3:05
2. "I Won't Let the Sun Go Down" (Extended Version) – 4:34
3. "I Won't Let the Sun Go Down" (Summer Club Mix) – 7:00
4. "Reggae in the Night" – 3:25

=== Weekly charts ===
Weekly chart performance for "I Won't Let the Sun Go Down"
Chart (1996)	Peak position
Denmark (Tracklisten)	4
Finland (Suomen virallinen lista)	16
Italy (Musica e dischi)	20
Sweden (Sverigetopplistan)	3

=== Year-end charts ===
Year-end chart performance for "I Won't Let the Sun Go Down"
Chart (1996)	Position
Sweden (Topplistan)	12
