= The Riddle (Nik Kershaw song) =

1984 single by Nik Kershaw

- Cover of the 12-inch single

Single by Nik Kershaw

from the album The Riddle
- B-side: "Progress (Live)"
- Released: 5 November 1984
- Recorded: 1984
- Genre: Synth-pop
- Length: 3:52
- Label: MCA
- Songwriter: Nik Kershaw
- Producer: Peter Collins

Nik Kershaw singles chronology
"Human Racing" (1984)	"The Riddle" (1984)	"Wide Boy" (1985)

Music video
- "The Riddle" on YouTube

"The Riddle" is a song by the English singer-songwriter Nik Kershaw, released in 1984 as the lead single from his studio album of the same name. Kershaw described the lyrical content as being nondescript to fill as a "guide vocal" for the production. It reached number three on the UK Singles Chart and peaked within the top 10 in countries like Ireland, Norway, Sweden, Australia and New Zealand. An accompanying music video was made for the song and features references to Lewis Carroll's book Alice's Adventures in Wonderland (1865).

The song was covered by many artists, including Eläkeläiset, Gigi D'Agostino (1999), the German Folk band dArtagnan together with Styrian band Visions of Atlantis, Cécile Corbel, Jack Holiday and Mike Candys.

== Lyrics ==
The "riddling" lyrics caused speculation among listeners as to their meaning; Kershaw states that there is in fact no intended meaning at all, the words simply being a "guide vocal" thrown together to fit the music. Kershaw has stated: "In short, 'The Riddle' is nonsense, rubbish, bollocks, the confused ramblings of an 80s popstar."

== Music video ==
The music video to "The Riddle", directed by Storm Thorgerson, depicts Kershaw walking through a house shaped like a question mark, making his way through certain obstacles and looking through drawers while singing. The video depicts many references to Lewis Carroll's book Alice's Adventures in Wonderland (1865) with an appearance of a young girl exiting the room through a small door, two portly gentlemen who resemble Tweedledum and Tweedledee and an observation made by Kershaw to Through the Looking-Glass (1871).

At the beginning of the music video, Kershaw is seen trying to get through a door with a screwdriver. The video ends with the camera moving up away from Kershaw to reveal that the question mark is lying in an alleyway, at which point, a man in a green costume seen earlier in the video comes and picks it up. The green man is the Riddler, a villain from the Batman comics.

== Track listing ==
7" Single (WEA NIK 6)
A: "The Riddle" – 3:52
B: "Progress" (Live) – 3:02

12" Single (WEA NIKT 6)
A: "The Riddle" (Extended Riddle) – 5:08
B: "Progress" (Live) – 3:02

Cassette Single (WEA NIKC 6)
A1: "The Riddle" – 3:52
A2: "Interview"
A3: "Progress" (Live) – 3:02
B1: "I Won't Let the Sun Go Down on Me" (Extended Mix)
B2: "Wouldn't It Be Good" (Extended Mix)

== Credits ==
"The Riddle"
Produced by Peter Collins

"Progress"
Recorded Live at Hammersmith Odeon.
Mixed by Simon Boswell

"The Riddle (Extended Riddle)"
Produced by Peter Collins
The extended mix is named "Special Extended Mix" on the cover and "Extended Riddle" on the label.

== Charts ==
=== Weekly charts ===
Weekly chart performance for "The Riddle"
Chart (1984–1985)	Peak position
Australia (Kent Music Report)	6
Belgium (Ultratop 50 Flanders)	8
Canada Top Singles (RPM)	49
Europe (European Top 100 Singles)	10
Finland (Suomen virallinen lista)	12
France (SNEP)	18
Ireland (IRMA)	3
Italy (Musica e dischi)	10
Netherlands (Dutch Top 40)	19
Netherlands (Single Top 100)	19
New Zealand (Recorded Music NZ)	6
Norway (VG-lista)	5
Portugal (AFP)	3
South Africa (Springbok Radio)	9
Sweden (Sverigetopplistan)	5
Switzerland (Schweizer Hitparade)	15
UK Singles (Official Charts)	3
US Bubbling Under Hot 100 Singles (Billboard)	7
West Germany (GfK)	8

=== Year-end charts ===
1984 year-end chart performance for "The Riddle"
Chart (1984)	Position
UK Singles (Gallup)	45

1985 year-end chart performance for "The Riddle"
Chart (1985)	Position
Australia (Kent Music Report)	85
West Germany (Media Control)	72

== Certifications ==
Sales and certifications for "The Riddle"
Region	Certification	Certified units/sales
Denmark (IFPI Danmark)	Gold	45,000^{‡}
^{‡} Sales+streaming figures based on certification alone.

== Gigi D'Agostino version ==
"The Riddle"

Single by Gigi D'Agostino

from the album L'Amour Toujours
- B-side: "Remix"
- Released: December 1999
- Recorded: 1999
- Genre: Italo dance
- Length: 4:45
- Label: ZYX
- Songwriter: Nik Kershaw
- Producer: Gigi D'Agostino

Gigi D'Agostino singles chronology
"Another Way" (1999)	"The Riddle" (1999)	"La Passion" (2000)

Music video
- "The Riddle" on YouTube

"The Riddle" was covered as a dance song by Italian DJ and record producer Gigi D'Agostino, featuring uncredited vocals by British singer Adam Austin. This version was released on D'Agostino's second studio album, L'Amour Toujours (1999). The same lyrics are used as in Kershaw's song, but the order is changed and the tempo is faster. Although only a top-40 hit in the DJ's home country, the song landed in the top-ten in Canada and several countries in Europe.

=== Music video ===
The music video, which was made by Andreas Hykade, features La Linea-styled animation like the "Bla Bla Bla" music video (both of which feature Baba, the same humanoid character), taking place entirely with white lines on a light green background and features the aforementioned character fighting a dragon-like creature on a mountainous terrain.

=== Weekly charts ===
1999 weekly chart performance for "The Riddle"
Chart (1999)	Peak position
Italy (Musica e Dischi)	31

2000 weekly chart performance for "The Riddle"
Chart (2000)	Peak position
Austria (Ö3 Austria Top 40)	14
Canada (Nielsen SoundScan)	8
Canada Dance/Urban (RPM)	12 (Note: "The Riddle" reached number 12 when RPM ceased publication in November 2000.)
Europe (Eurochart Hot 100 Singles)	15
France (SNEP)	7
Germany (GfK)	4
Hungary (MAHASZ)	5
Switzerland (Schweizer Hitparade)	8

2002 weekly chart performance for "The Riddle"
Chart (2002)	Peak position
Belgium (Ultratop 50 Flanders)	4
Belgium (Ultratip Bubbling Under Wallonia)	11
Netherlands (Dutch Top 40)	4
Netherlands (Single Top 100)	4

=== Year-end charts ===
2000 year-end chart performance for "The Riddle"
Chart (2000)	Position
Austria (Ö3 Austria Top 40)	26
Europe (Eurochart Hot 100)	53
European Airplay (Border Breakers)	6
Germany (Media Control)	23
Switzerland (Schweizer Hitparade)	67

2002 year-end chart performance for "The Riddle"
Chart (2002)	Position
Belgium (Ultratop 50 Flanders)	47
Netherlands (Dutch Top 40)	61
Netherlands (Single Top 100)	52

=== Certifications ===
Certifications for "The Riddle"
Region	Certification	Certified units/sales
Austria (IFPI Austria)	Gold	25,000^{*}
France (SNEP)	Silver	125,000^{*}
Germany (BVMI)	Gold	250,000^{^}
Italy (FIMI)	Gold	50,000^{‡}
^{*} Sales figures based on certification alone.^{^} Shipments figures based on certification alone.^{‡} Sales+streaming figures based on certification alone.

== Jack Holiday and Mike Candys version ==
"The Riddle Anthem"

Single by Jack Holiday and Mike Candys
- Released: 19 November 2012
- Genre: Electronic
- Length: 3:13
- Songwriter: Nik Kershaw
- Producers: Mike Candys; Jack Holiday

Jack Holiday singles chronology
"Children 2012" (2012)	"The Riddle Anthem" (2012)	"The Riddle Anthem (Rework)" (2018)

Mike Candys singles chronology
"Sunshine (Fly So High)" (2012)	"The Riddle Anthem" (2012)	"Bring Back the Love" (2013)

Music video
- "The Riddle Anthem" on YouTube

"The Riddle" was covered as a dance song by Swiss DJs Mike Candys and Jack Holiday. It was retitled "The Riddle Anthem" and released in November 2012.

=== Charts ===
Chart performance for "The Riddle"
Chart (2012–2013)	Peak position
Austria (Ö3 Austria Top 40)	29
Belgium (Ultratip Bubbling Under Wallonia)	31
France (SNEP)	43
Germany (GfK)	44
Switzerland (Schweizer Hitparade)	26
