= Peter Collins (music producer) =

British record producer (1951–2024)

- Born: Peter Julian Alexander Collins; 14 January 1951; Reading, England
- Died: 28 June 2024 (aged 73) Nashville, Tennessee, U.S.
- Genres: Rock; pop
- Occupations: Record producer; arranger; audio engineer
- Years active: 1970–2019

Peter Julian Alexander Collins (14 January 1951 – 28 June 2024) was an English record producer, arranger, and audio engineer. He produced records by Gary Moore, Bon Jovi, Billy Squier, Rush, Air Supply, Alice Cooper, Nik Kershaw, Blancmange, Suicidal Tendencies, Queensrÿche, Indigo Girls, Nanci Griffith, Jermaine Stewart, Jane Wiedlin, October Project, The Cardigans, Rosetta Stone, Save Ferris, Josh Joplin, Tracey Ullman, Drake Bell, Ultraspank and The Brian Setzer Orchestra.

== Early life ==
Peter Collins was born in Reading, England, on 14 January 1951, the son of Gerald and Rita Collins. His father played clarinet in a jazz band and was later an art dealer with a gallery in Dorset. Collins grew up in Sussex and attended Steyning Grammar School, from where he went to sixth-form college in Brighton.

== Career ==
Collins signed a recording deal with Decca as a singer-songwriter, but while recording his first album realised that he was "more interested in being in the studio and the process of making a record". He took a job as assistant producer at the Decca studios in north London, which he later said in practice meant being the tea-boy, but he "crept back after hours" to record his own radio and TV jingles. In 1976, he was signed to Magnet Records and formed a group called Madison, along with Sippy, Peter Spooner and "Page 3" girl Cherri Gilham, to perform the pop song "Let It Ring". Collins acted as producer, but the record failed to chart and the group disbanded.

In 1980 he formed a production company with Pete Waterman, who put him in charge of recording. His early credits as a producer included producing the first two albums for The Lambrettas and their chart hit "Poison Ivy". In 1982 he had his first no.1 single when he co-produced Musical Youth's "Pass the Dutchie". In 1983 he produced Nik Kershaw's debut studio album, Human Racing, which was a success in Europe. Nine months later, he produced Kershaw's second studio album, The Riddle.

Collins moved to Nashville in 1985 for the "excellent studios...and superb musicians." He produced albums for Rush, who called him "Mister Big" and credited him with giving their sound a commercial edge that broadened their appeal and improved their record sales, first working on Power Windows (1985) and then Hold Your Fire (1987). Known at the time as a pop producer, he brought a more heavily synthesised sound to Rush. Collins recalled, "I had a British pop sensibility...I was able to bring some pop elements to the music." After reluctantly declining to work with the band for their albums Presto and Roll the Bones, he later returned to collaborate with the band for Counterparts and Test for Echo, creating a return to Rush's heavier rock sound.

Collins had "an unashamedly old-fashioned" approach to recording and insisted that his acts have their material fully rehearsed and ready to record before they went into the studio. After a "Spinal Tap moment" when he suggested to a British band in Los Angeles that they run through the songs they would be recording and there was "a stunned silence", he made it a rule to hear the band's material first before agreeing to record them, "however big they might be". He preferred the "organic" method of recording live in the studio, rather than piecing tracks together. He considered night-time sessions an unnecessary indulgence and worked a nine-hour day to 8pm. In 1991, Collins produced Alice Cooper's Hey Stoopid album, which peaked at No. 47 on the Billboard 200 and was the follow-up to the Desmond Child produced Trash album. He also produced the Queensrÿche albums Operation: Mindcrime, Empire (No. 7 on the Billboard 200) and Hear in the Now Frontier.

== Personal life and death ==
Collins married Debi from Mississippi, who suggested their move to the US, and had a son, Alex. They were later divorced. In later life he became a keen salsa dancer and Argentine tango dancer after lessons with Christy Byers from Louisville, Ky and flyer of model aircraft.

Peter Collins died from pancreatic cancer at his home in Nashville, Tennessee, on 28 June 2024, at the age of 73.

== Production discography ==
- The Lambrettas – Beat Boys in the Jet Age (1980)
- The Lambrettas – Ambience (1981)
- Tygers of Pan Tang – The Cage (1982)
- Musical Youth – The Youth of Today (1982)
- The Belle Stars – The Belle Stars (1983)
- Musical Youth – Different Style! (1983)
- Tracey Ullman – You Broke My Heart in 17 Places (1983)
- Nik Kershaw – Human Racing (1984)
- Blancmange - Don't Tell Me (1984)
- Blancmange - The Day Before You Came (1984)
- Jermaine Stewart – The Word Is Out (1984)
- Matt Bianco – Whose Side Are You On? (1984)
- Nik Kershaw - The Riddle (1984)
- Tracey Ullman – You Caught Me Out (1984)
- Air Supply – Air Supply (1985)
- Gary Moore – Run for Cover (1985)
- Rush – Power Windows (1985)
- Billy Squier – Enough Is Enough (1986)
- Gary Moore – Wild Frontier (1987)
- Rush - Hold Your Fire (1987)
- Queensrÿche – Operation: Mindcrime (1988)
- Voice of the Beehive – Let It Bee (1988)
- Gary Moore – After the War (1989)
- Tom Jones – At This Moment (1989)
- Wax – A Hundred Thousand in Fresh Notes (1989)
- Jane Wiedlin – Tangled (1990)
- Queensrÿche – Empire (1990)
- Alice Cooper – Hey Stoopid (1991)
- Saraya - When The Blackbird Sings... (1991)
- Indigo Girls – Rites of Passage (1992)
- Suicidal Tendencies – The Art of Rebellion (1992)
- Rush - Counterparts (1993)
- Indigo Girls – Swamp Ophelia (1994)
- Nanci Griffith – Flyer (1994)
- Bon Jovi - These Days (1995)
- Rush - Test for Echo (1996)
- Divinyls – Underworld (1996)
- Queensrÿche – Hear in the Now Frontier (1997)
- Save Ferris – It Means Everything (1997)
- Letters to Cleo - Go! (1997)
- The Brian Setzer Orchestra – The Dirty Boogie (1998)
- Shawn Mullins – Soul's Core (1998)
- Jewel - Spirit (1998)
- Nanci Griffith – The Dust Bowl Symphony (1999)
- Ultraspank – Progress (2000)
- The Brian Setzer Orchestra – Vavoom! (2000)
- Systematic - Somewhere in Between (2001)
- Lisa Loeb - Cake and Pie (2002)
- Indigo Girls – Become You (2002)
- The Brian Setzer Orchestra – Boogie Woogie Christmas (2002)
- Indigo Girls – All That We Let In (2004)
- Sandra McCracken – Best Laid Plans (2004)
- Beth Nielsen Chapman – Look (2005)
- Courtney Jaye – Traveling Light (2005)
- Rick Astley – Portrait (2005)
- Carbon Leaf – Love, Loss, Hope, Repeat (2006)
- Nanci Griffith – Ruby's Torch (2006)
- Kenny Loggins – How About Now (2007)
- Indigo Girls – Holly Happy Days (2010)
- Indigo Girls – Beauty Queen Sister (2011)
- Flying Colors – Flying Colors (2012)
- Drake Bell – Ready Steady Go! (April 2014)
- Brian Setzer – Rockabilly Riot! All Original (2014)
- The Brian Setzer Orchestra – Rockin' Rudolph (2015)
- Stray Cats – 40 (2019)
