= Nik Kershaw =

English musician (born 1958)

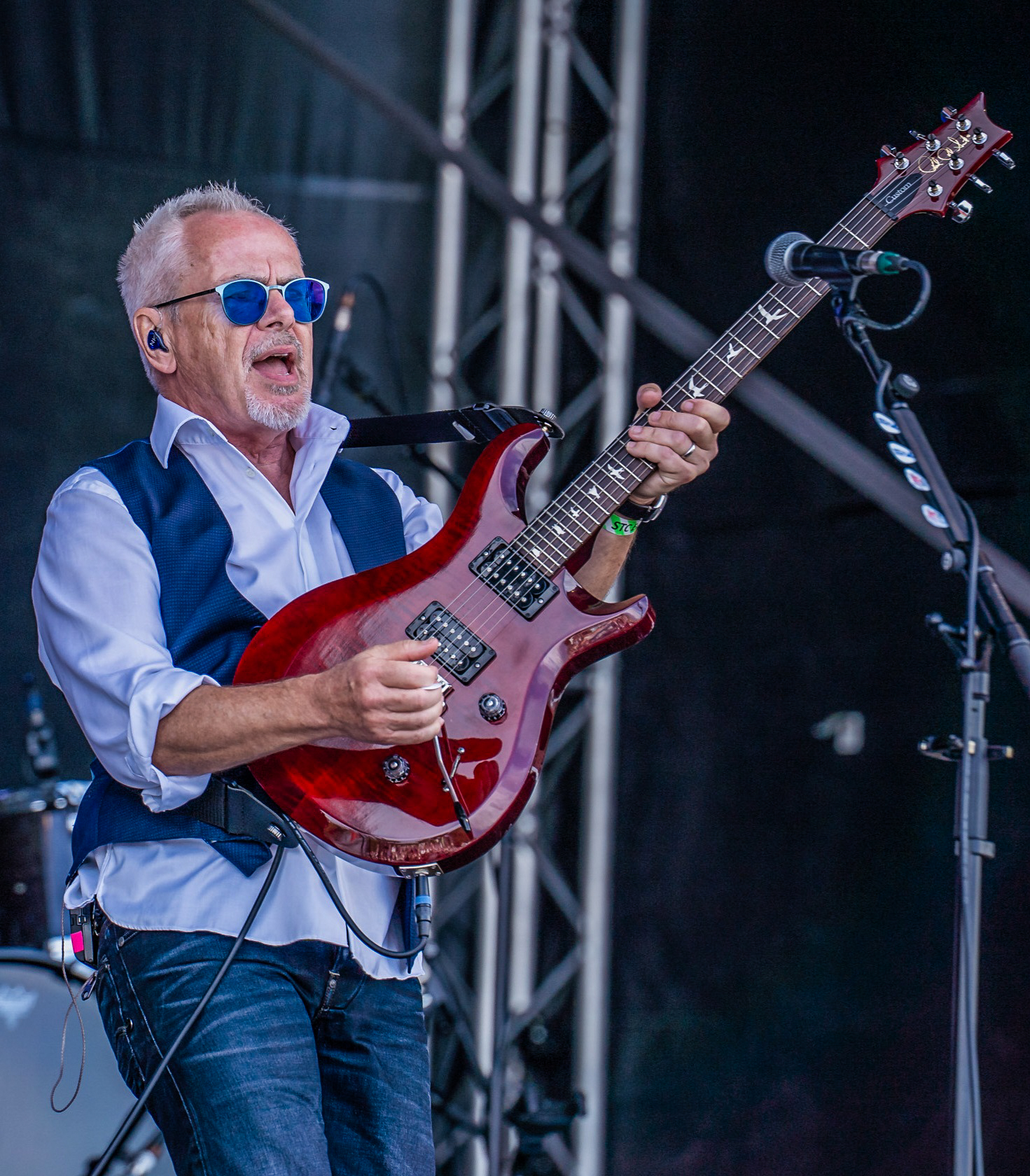
- Kershaw performing live in 2025

Background information
- Born: Nicholas David Kershaw; 1 March 1958 (age 68); Bristol, England
- Origin: Ipswich, England
- Genres: Pop; synth-pop; new wave; jazz fusion
- Occupations: Singer; songwriter; multi-instrumentalist; record producer
- Instruments: Vocals; guitar; keyboards; bass guitar; percussion
- Works: Discography
- Years active: 1973–present
- Labels: Ariola; Universal; MCA; Koch; Eagle; Rhino; Shorthouse; Spectrum Music; Audio Network
- Formerly of: Thor; Half Pint Hog; The Reg Webb Band; Fusion
- Spouses: Sheri Pogmore (m. 1983; div. 2003); Sarah Kershaw (m. 2009)
- Website: nikkershaw.net

Nicholas David Kershaw (born 1 March 1958) is an English singer, songwriter and multi-instrumentalist. He came to prominence in 1984 as a solo artist, releasing eight singles that entered the top 40 of the UK singles chart during the decade, including "Wouldn't It Be Good", "Dancing Girls", "I Won't Let the Sun Go Down on Me", "Human Racing", "The Riddle", "Wide Boy", "Don Quixote", and "When a Heart Beats". His 62 weeks on the UK singles chart through 1984 and 1985 beat all other solo artists.

Kershaw appeared at the multi-venue benefit concert Live Aid in 1985 and has penned a number of songs for other artists, including Chesney Hawkes's 1991 UK No. 1 single "The One and Only".

== Early years ==
Nicholas David Kershaw was born on 1 March 1958 in Bristol but grew up in Ipswich, Suffolk. His father was a flautist and his mother was an opera singer. He was educated at Northgate Grammar School for Boys where he played the guitar – he was self-taught on this instrument. He left school in the middle of his A-Levels and obtained a job at an unemployment benefit office. He also sang in a number of underground Ipswich bands, most notably Fusion, a jazz fusion band which blended jazz, funk, and rock, covering artists such as Steely Dan and Weather Report. When it broke up in 1982, he embarked on a full-time solo career as a musician and songwriter.

== Career ==
=== 1980s ===
Kershaw was unemployed for a year after leaving Fusion, but during this time he found manager Mickey Modern after placing an advertisement in the magazine Melody Maker. Modern secured a recording contract for Kershaw at MCA. In September 1983, Kershaw released his first single "I Won't Let the Sun Go Down on Me", which reached No. 47 on the UK singles chart.

At the beginning of 1984, Kershaw released his breakthrough song "Wouldn't It Be Good", which reached No. 4 in the UK, and was a big success in Europe, particularly in Ireland, Germany, Italy, Switzerland, and Scandinavia, and also in Canada, Australia, and New Zealand. The music video, featuring Kershaw as a chroma key-suited alien, received heavy rotation from MTV, helping the song to reach No. 46 in the United States. He enjoyed three more top 20 hits from his debut solo studio album Human Racing, including the title track and a successful re-issue of "I Won't Let the Sun Go Down on Me". This track ultimately proved his biggest hit as a performer when it reached No. 2 in the UK. It also became a major hit in Scandinavia, Switzerland and the Netherlands.

Kershaw's second studio album was The Riddle. The title track, released in November 1984, proved to be his third international hit single, reaching No. 3 in the UK and Ireland, and No. 6 in New Zealand. The album also spawned two more UK top 10 hits, "Wide Boy" and "Don Quixote", as it went multi-platinum. During this time, Kershaw toured extensively with his backing band the Krew, consisting of Keith Airey, Tim Moore, Mark Price and Dennis Smith.

In July 1985, Kershaw was among the performers at Live Aid, held at Wembley Stadium. He described the experience as "absolutely terrifying". The concert turned out to be the peak of his career, as his stardom began to wane soon afterwards and he enjoyed only one more UK top 40 hit with "When a Heart Beats". He continued to record and release records and collaborated with others on a number of projects, including playing guitar on Elton John's hit single "Nikita".

A cover version of "Wouldn't it be Good" by the Danny Hutton Hitters appeared on the soundtrack of the 1986 teen romantic comedy drama film Pretty in Pink. Later that same year, Kershaw's third solo studio album, Radio Musicola, was released to critical acclaim but to little commercial success. The Works was released in 1989, also to little success. Two singles were released from the album, "One Step Ahead" and "Elisabeth's Eyes".

=== 1990s ===
In 1991, Kershaw's song "The One and Only" appeared on the soundtrack to the British film Buddy's Song, and in the American film Doc Hollywood. "The One and Only" became a UK No. 1 hit for the star of Buddy's Song, Chesney Hawkes.

During 1991, he worked with Tony Banks, the keyboardist of Genesis, on Banks' third solo studio album Still. Kershaw co-wrote two songs with Banks, providing lead vocals on both. He also sang on the Banks composition "The Final Curtain".

In 1993, the Hollies had a minor hit with another of Kershaw's songs, "The Woman I Love". During the mid-1990s he also wrote and produced material for the boy band Let Loose, with two of the tracks ("Seventeen" and "Everybody Say Everybody Do") achieving reasonable success. Following this year, Kershaw appeared on Elton John's 1993 Duets studio album, for which he wrote and produced the song "Old Friend", and played all the instruments on the track.

1999 saw the release of his fifth studio album, 15 Minutes. Kershaw decided to record the tracks himself, when he could not envisage them being recorded by other artists. The album spawned two singles, "Somebody Loves You" and "What Do You Think of It So Far?", the latter a song described as "an elegant and soaring ode to the transience of time, infused with both self-doubt and an acceptance of life that can only come with maturity".

=== 2000–present ===
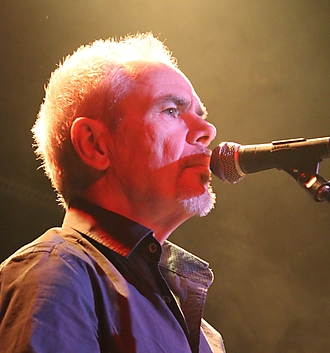
Kershaw performing in 2013

The follow-up studio album, To Be Frank, was released in 2001. Over the years, Kershaw has collaborated on albums with artists such as Elton John, Bonnie Tyler, Sia and Gary Barlow.

In 2005, Kershaw released Then and Now, a collection of earlier material with four new tracks. In 2006, he completed another solo studio album, You've Got to Laugh, available only through his website or digitally through iTunes. This album contained twelve tracks and was released on Kershaw's own label, Shorthouse Records. Neither Then and Now nor You've Got to Laugh was promoted by a tour. The year also saw the digital re-release of his 1980s back catalogue including Human Racing, The Riddle, Radio Musicola and The Works.

In August 2009, Kershaw performed at Fairport's Cropredy Convention and the Rewind Festival on Temple Island Meadows at Henley-on-Thames.

On 13 May 2010, Kershaw appeared on stage and hosted "Our Friends Acoustic" in aid of Mencap. He performed "The Riddle", "Wouldn't It Be Good", "Dancing Girls" and "I Won't Let the Sun Go Down on Me". Other 1980s performers joined him and performed their own songs, including Howard Jones, Andy Bell of Erasure and Carol Decker of T'Pau at The O2 in London.

Kershaw wrote songs and performed for the soundtrack of the 2010 film, Round Ireland with a Fridge by Tony Hawks. He wrote and sang the theme song, "If It Gets Much Better Than This". He also appeared as an extra in the penultimate scene, presenting a copy of the book to Hawks for signing in the book shop.

Following the release of his eighth studio album in 2012 (Ei8ht, his first release to reach the UK Albums Chart since 1986), Kershaw undertook a small tour of the UK, with some European dates. As part of each show he played the entirety of his debut studio album, which had been re-mastered and re-released in March 2012.

In 2012, Kershaw was featured as the lead vocalist on a new recording of "The Lamia", originally recorded by Genesis for their studio album The Lamb Lies Down on Broadway (1974), with Steve Hackett for the latter's Genesis Revisited II studio album. He is also featured as a guest performer on the same song on Hackett's Genesis Revisited: Live at Hammersmith CD and DVD, released November 2013.

Kershaw performed a solo acoustic set at Fairport's Cropredy Convention in August 2013. He was on tour in the UK and Ireland in Autumn 2014. He continues to perform at 1980s revival events and festivals each year. In the latter part of 2015 he performed a 31-date tour of the UK, on a double bill with Go West, supported by Carol Decker of T'Pau.

On 11 November 2016, Kershaw performed in Reykjavík, Iceland, together with the pop rock band Todmobile. He joined them after a short set of eight songs and played guitar on three Todmobile songs.

In June 2020, Kershaw released an extended play (EP) of six new songs, These Little Things. Oxymoron is Kershaw's most recent full studio album, which was released in October 2020. It features 16 songs, which were recorded at Abbey Road Studios.

In 2024, Kershaw went on a co-headlining tour with Go West in Australia and New Zealand.

In late 2024, Kershaw embarked on a 40th Anniversary Tour, titled 'The 1984 Tour'. Kershaw performed both iconic platinum albums Human Racing & The Riddle in their entirety.

== Personal life ==
Kershaw's first wife was Canadian Sheri Pogmore, herself a musician who featured on several of Kershaw's early studio albums. The couple married in July 1983, had three children together, and divorced in 2003. Their second son was born with Down syndrome. Kershaw remarried in 2009 and has also had a child with his second wife Sarah.

In 2019, Kershaw received an Honorary Doctorate from the University of Suffolk for his services to the music industry.

== Discography ==
Studio albums

- Human Racing (1984)
- The Riddle (1984)
- Radio Musicola (1986)
- The Works (1989)
- 15 Minutes (1999)
- To Be Frank (2001)
- You've Got to Laugh (2006)
- Ei8ht (2012)
- Oxymoron (2020)

== Written work ==
- Musings & Lyrics: Inane Ramblings of a Grateful Idiot (2025)

== Collaborations ==
- 1985: "Nikita" by Elton John – Kershaw on electric guitar and backing vocals with George Michael.
- 1985: "Act of War" by Elton John – Kershaw on electric guitar
- 1991: Still by Tony Banks – Kershaw on lead vocals on "Red Day on Blue Street", "I Wanna Change the Score" and "The Final Curtain". "Red Day on Blue Street" and "I Wanna Change the Score" co-written by Banks and Kershaw.
- 1993: Duets by Elton John – "Old Friend" written by Kershaw. All instruments by Kershaw. Vocals by Kershaw and John.
- 1994: "Seventeen" (single) by Let Loose – co-writer and producer.
- 1996: "Walls of Sound" (single) from Strictly Inc. – B-side "Back to You" was co-written by Banks and Kershaw.
- 1998: Live the Life by Michael W. Smith – "Let Me Show You the Way" co-written by Kershaw, Smith and producer Stephen Lipson. Also featured Smith and Kershaw on guitar.
- 1999: Darkdancer by Les Rythmes Digitales – "Sometimes" co-written by Jacques Lu Cont and Kershaw. Lead vocals by Kershaw.
- 1999: This Is Your Time by Michael W. Smith – "Hey You It's Me" – co-written by Kershaw and Smith. Backing vocals by Kershaw.
- 2001: "Island" by Orinoko – co-written by Kershaw.
- 2010: Come Out and Play by Kim Wilde – duet with Wilde on the track "Love Conquers All".
- 2010: Heavy Rain (video game) – "Falling Backwards" – written and guitar by Kershaw
- 2012: The King of Number 33 by DeeExpus, song "Memo" – lead vocals Kershaw.
- 2012: Genesis Revisited 2 by Steve Hackett, song "The Lamia" – lead vocals Kershaw.
- 2015: "Lonely Robot" Guitar on "Humans Being"
- 2016: "The Sky's the Limit" on Fly (Songs Inspired by the Film: Eddie the Eagle)
- 2021: "Sink or Swim" by Lily González "I Like You Better When You're Gone" co-written by Nik Kershaw
- 2022: "paranoid" by Izzy Kershaw

== See also ==
- List of new wave artists
- List of singer-songwriters
- List of synth-pop artists
- List of performers on Top of the Pops
