= Wouldn't It Be Good =

Single by Nik Kershaw

from the album Human Racing
- B-side: "Monkey Business"
- Released: 20 January 1984
- Recorded: Summer 1983
- Genre: Pop rock; new wave
- Length: 4:32 (album version); 4:19 (single version); 6:50 (extended version)
- Label: MCA
- Songwriter: Nik Kershaw
- Producer: Peter Collins

Nik Kershaw singles chronology
"I Won't Let the Sun Go Down on Me" (1983)	"Wouldn't It Be Good" (1984)	"Dancing Girls" (1984)

Music video
- "Wouldn't It Be Good" on YouTube

"Wouldn't It Be Good" is a song by the English singer-songwriter Nik Kershaw, released on 20 January 1984 as the second single from his debut studio album, Human Racing (1984). The release was Kershaw's second single, with the non-album track "Monkey Business" as its B-side; it was a bonus track on the 2012 re-release of the album. The music video was directed by Storm Thorgerson.

== Background and recording ==
"Wouldn't It Be Good" was the second single from Kershaw's debut studio album Human Racing (1984). It spent three weeks at No. 4 on the UK Singles Chart and was successful throughout Europe, as well as a top-10 entry in Canada and Australia. Kershaw is also most closely associated with this song in the United States, where it narrowly missed the top 40. Kershaw performed it at Live Aid in London's Wembley Stadium in July 1985.

Kershaw's first single from this album had failed to be a major hit, and it was on the strength of this recording's success that the earlier single, "I Won't Let the Sun Go Down on Me", was promoted for a re-release. This time, the single went all the way to No. 2 in the UK, becoming his highest-charting single there to date.

Kershaw remembers that this was one of the last songs he wrote for the Human Racing album, mapping out the chords first on a keyboard. However, the aggressive guitar sound he wanted led to a clash in harmonics and therefore the result sounded rather unpleasant. Thus he decided to create a kind of "guitar orchestra", inspired by the work of Queen's Brian May, where the notes were separated into single lines and harmonies. Kershaw elaborates on the layering of the guitar lines:

I think I'm playing fifths in one go. But some of the more subtle notes just didn't work, so I think I did about four takes of each note, so there were a lot of takes, and this was all on analogue tape, obviously. We then bounced them all together to make that one sound.

According to Kershaw, there were about 20 guitars on this song alone, and there was a bit of trouble in trying to get the other instruments being overdubbed (such as bass and keyboards) in tune with the guitars. The main synthesizer riff was produced using a combination of PPG Wave 2.2 and a Yamaha DX7.

== Release and critical reception ==
"Wouldn't It Be Good" was released in a single version and an extended 12" version. A remix by Simon Boswell, clocking in at 7:20, appears on the album Retro:Active 4: Rare & Remixed. In 1985, "Wouldn't It Be Good" appeared on the soundtrack to the film Gotcha!

In a review of the single's 1991 reissue, Stephen Dalton of NME praised it as "a deeply felt ennui at the hopeless dreams and aspirations of idealistic youth" and a "welcome re-release from a much underrated innovator of early synth-pop".

== Music video ==
In the music video for "Wouldn't It Be Good", Kershaw is an extraterrestrial visitor who observes the characteristics of the people around him. It was directed by graphic designer Storm Thorgerson, was released in 1984 and received heavy rotation on MTV, which helped the song reach No. 46 on the US charts. It used chroma key technology to achieve the alien suit's special effects. The music video was filmed in mid-January 1984 over a period of three days, primarily in and around St. James' Court Hotel, London. The closing scenes were recorded at the Mullard Radio Astronomy Observatory, near Cambridge.

According to Kershaw, the song was about "always wanting it better than everyone else", a concept which the director of the video further developed and integrated into the video plot of Kershaw being the alien who steps into other people's shoes. But in the end the alien realises that it was not such a good idea at all, and decides to return to his home planet.

== Track listings ==
- 7-inch single

A. "Wouldn't It Be Good" – 4:35
B. "Monkey Business" – 3:28

- 12-inch single

A. "Wouldn't It Be Good" (special extended mix) – 6:50
B. "Monkey Business" – 3:28

== Charts ==
=== Weekly charts ===
Weekly chart performance for "Wouldn't It Be Good"
Chart (1984)	Peak position
Australia (Kent Music Report)	5
Austria (Ö3 Austria Top 40)	12
Belgium (Ultratop 50 Flanders)	17
Canada Top Singles (RPM)	9
Canada (The Record)	7
Europe (European Top 100 Singles)	9
France (SNEP)	35
Ireland (IRMA)	2
Italy (Musica e dischi)	14
Netherlands (Dutch Top 40)	24
Netherlands (Single Top 100)	32
New Zealand (Recorded Music NZ)	16
Norway (VG-lista)	6
South Africa (Springbok Radio)	14
Spain (AFYVE)	26
Switzerland (Schweizer Hitparade)	3
UK Singles (Official Charts)	4
US Billboard Hot 100	46
US Mainstream Rock (Billboard)	58
US Cash Box Top 100 Singles	47
West Germany (GfK)	2

=== Year-end charts ===
Year-end chart performance for "Wouldn't It Be Good"
Chart (1984)	Position
Australia (Kent Music Report)	55
Canada Top Singles (RPM)	62
Switzerland (Schweizer Hitparade)	30
UK Singles (Gallup)	41
West Germany (Official German Charts)	26

== Certifications ==
Certifications for "Wouldn't It Be Good"
Region	Certification	Certified units/sales
United Kingdom (BPI)	Silver	250,000^{^}
^{^} Shipments figures based on certification alone.

== Cover versions ==
- In 1984, German singer Juliane Werding recorded a German-language version, titled "Sonne auf der Haut".
- In 1986, Danny Hutton Hitters did a rendition which appeared on the soundtrack for the 1986 film Pretty in Pink.
- In 1986, Barbara Dickson covered it for her studio album The Right Moment
- In 1992, American singer-songwriter Tommy Page did a cover for his studio album, A Friend to Rely On.
- In 2006, German dance music act Cascada recorded their version for their studio album Everytime We Touch. It reached No. 54 in the Swedish national record chart.
