= 16 Biggest Hits (Liza Minnelli album) =

Compilation album by Liza Minnelli
- Released: July 18, 2000
- Recorded: 1972–1992
- Genre: Traditional
- Label: Legacy

Liza Minnelli chronology
Minnelli on Minnelli (2000)	16 Biggest Hits (2000)	20th Century Masters – The Millennium Collection: The Best of Liza Minnelli (2001)

16 Biggest Hits is a compilation album by American singer and actress Liza Minnelli, released by Legacy Recordings, (Note: Legacy Records is an archival label under Sony Music, which releases songs from the catalog of artists previously signed to the company.) in July 2000. The album focuses on songs from her tenure with Columbia Records. Due to the fact that her recordings are spread across multiple labels, the compilation utilizes live versions from her Columbia albums to represent career-defining songs whose original studio recordings are owned by other companies.

The tracklist includes material from her Broadway shows, such as "Cabaret" and "Theme from New York, New York" from film, and "Losing My Mind" from her 1989 album Results. In some Latin American countries, the album was expanded and released under different titles, such as Vinteum: 21 Grandes Sucessos and Los Exitos Del Siglo featuring five additional tracks.

Music critics gave 16 Biggest Hits favorable reviews.

== Album details ==
Liza Minnelli’s career spans decades of success across multiple fields, including music, theater, and film. As a result, compiling a comprehensive collection of her hits is commercially and bureaucratically challenging, as her recordings are spread across different labels. Prior compilations to 16 Biggest Hits were organized based on the labels under which the songs were originally released. Her early recordings under Capitol Records were featured in A Touch of Class (1997) and The Capitol Years (2001). Her work with A&M Records was compiled in The Liza Minnelli Foursider (1973) and The Collection (1998). Her Columbia Records era is represented in Simply The Best (1982), Liza (1993), and All That Jazz (1999).

For 16 Biggest Hits, producer Didier C. Deutsch selected songs that were not necessarily hits but represented Minnelli’s most celebrated career moments and the standards she became associated with. Since many original recordings were under other labels, live versions from her Columbia albums were used instead. From her Broadway career, the album includes "Quiet Thing" from Flora the Red Menace, as well as "My Own Best Friend" and "All That Jazz" from Chicago. Her film work is represented by "Cabaret" and "Theme from New York, New York." The song "Liza with a Z" comes from her Emmy-winning concert special of the same name. "Losing My Mind" was Minnelli’s highest-charting single, taken from her 1989 album Results.

In some Latin American countries, the album was released as a double album titled Vinteum: 21 Grandes Sucessos (in Brazil) or Los Exitos Del Siglo, featuring new cover art and five additional tracks: "Don't Drop Bombs", "Rent", and "So Sorry, I Said" from the album Results, as well as two live recordings—"Stepping Out" and "There's No Business Like Show Business".

== Critical reception ==
Professional ratings
Review scores
Source	Rating
AllMusic	3/5 stars

William Ruhlmann of AllMusic wrote that while Minnelli's selected recordings are familiar and enjoyable, some tracks lack a special connection to her and hardly qualify as 'biggest hits'. He criticized the omission of signature songs like "Maybe This Time" from Cabaret, despite multiple live versions being available.

Max O. Preeo of Show Music magazine praised the album, particularly highlighting Minnelli's Broadway selections from Chicago, "My Own Best Friend" and "All That Jazz".

== Track listing ==
16 Biggest Hits
No.	Title	Writer(s)	Album	Length
1.	"Liza With A "Z""	John Kander; Fred Ebb	Liza with a Z	2:25
2.	"Bye Bye Blackbird"	Mort Dixon, Ray Henderson	Liza with a Z	3:58
3.	"The Singer"	Walter Marks	The Singer	2:25
4.	"You're So Vain"	Carly Simon	The Singer	3:18
5.	"Some People"	Jule Styne, Stephen Sondheim	Live from Radio City Music Hall	3:19
6.	"Shine On Harvest Moon"	Jack Norworth, Nora Bayes	Live at the Winter Garden	4:15
7.	"Old Friends"	S. Sondheim	Live from Radio City Music Hall	1:12
8.	"There Is A Time"	Charles Aznavour, Gene Lees, Jeff Davis	Live at the Winter Garden	2:17
9.	"Where Is The Love"	Ralph MacDonald, William Salter	The Singer	2:46
10.	"Losing My Mind"	S. Sondheim	Results	4:08
11.	"My Own Best Friend" (from the musical Chicago)	J. Kander, F. Ebb	Single only	3:10
12.	"Quiet Thing"	J. Kander, F. Ebb	Live at the Winter Garden	2:50
13.	"Ring Them Bells"	J. Kander, F. Ebb	Liza with a Z	5:16
14.	"All That Jazz" (from the musical Chicago)	J. Kander, F. Ebb	Single only	3:04
15.	"Theme from New York, New York"	J. Kander, F. Ebb	Live from Radio City Music Hall	5:09
16.	"Cabaret"	J. Kander, F. Ebb	Liza with a Z	4:01

21 Greatest Hits (CD1) / Los Éxitos del Siglo (CD1)
No.	Title	Writer(s)	Album	Length
1.	"Liza With A "Z""	John Kander; Fred Ebb	Liza with a Z	2:25
2.	"Bye Bye Blackbird"	Mort Dixon, Ray Henderson	Liza with a Z	3:58
3.	"The Singer"	Walter Marks	The Singer	2:25
4.	"You're So Vain"	Carly Simon	The Singer	3:18
5.	"Some People"	Jule Styne, Stephen Sondheim	Live from Radio City Music Hall	3:19
6.	"Shine On Harvest Moon"	Jack Norworth, Nora Bayes	Live at the Winter Garden	4:15
7.	"Old Friends"	S. Sondheim	Live from Radio City Music Hall	1:12
8.	"There Is A Time"	Charles Aznavour, Gene Lees, Jeff Davis	Live at the Winter Garden	2:17
9.	"Where Is The Love"	Ralph MacDonald, William Salter	The Singer	2:46
10.	"Losing My Mind"	S. Sondheim	Results	4:08
11.	"My Own Best Friend" (from the musical Chicago)	J. Kander, F. Ebb	Single only	3:10

21 Greatest Hits (CD2) / Los Éxitos del Siglo (CD2)
No.	Title	Writer(s)	Album	Length
1.	"Quiet Thing"	J. Kander, F. Ebb	Live at the Winter Garden	2:50
2.	"Ring Them Bells"	J. Kander, F. Ebb	Liza with a Z	5:16
3.	"All That Jazz" (from the musical Chicago)	J. Kander, F. Ebb	Single only	3:04
4.	"Theme from New York, New York"	J. Kander, F. Ebb	Live from Radio City Music Hall	5:09
5.	"Cabaret"	J. Kander, F. Ebb	Liza with a Z	4:01
6.	"Don't Drop Bombs"	N. Tennant, C. Lowe	Results	3:37
7.	"Rent"	N. Tennant, C. Lowe	Results	3:48
8.	"So Sorry, I Said"	N. Tennant, C. Lowe	Results	3:13
9.	"Stepping Out"	J. Kander, F. Ebb	Live from Radio City Music Hall	1:59
10.	"There's No Business Like Show Business"	I. Berlin	Live from Radio City Music Hall	0:49

== Personnel ==
Credits adapted from the liner notes of 16 Biggest Hits CD.

- Compilation produced by Didier C. Deutsch
- Mastered by Chris Herles at Sony Music Studios, NY
- Legacy A&R: Steve Berkowitz
- Project direction: Thomas Burleigh & Joy Gilbert
- A&R coordination: Pattimatheny & Darren Salmieri
- Tape research: Stacey Boyle
- Packaging manager: Dianne Spoto Shattuck
- Art direction: Fredette/Sparagano

Credits adapted from the liner notes of Vinteum: 21 Grandes Sucessos CD.

- Design: Nu'des
- Assistant Art: Marcus Paulo
- Graphic coordinator: Carla Framback
