= Bloom (Tasmin Archer album) =

Studio album by Tasmin Archer
- Released: 25 March 1996
- Recorded: December 5–23, 1994; January 4–11, 1995
- Studio: Real World Studios, Box, Wiltshire; The Sound Factory, Hollywood, California
- Genre: Soul; pop; pop rock
- Length: 40:31
- Label: EMI
- Producer: Mitchell Froom

Tasmin Archer chronology
Shipbuilding (1994)	Bloom (1996)	On (2006)

Singles from Bloom
- 1. "One More Good Night with the Boys" Released: 4 March 1996; 2. "Sweet Little Truth" Released: 1 July 1996

Bloom is the second studio album by British singer-songwriter Tasmin Archer, released on 25 March 1996 by EMI Records.

== Background and recording ==
Archer started working on a follow-up to her successful debut album Great Expectations in late 1994, after the release of the Elvis Costello covers EP Shipbuilding early in the year. While continuing to work with her songwriting partner John Hughes, Bloom marked her first album without longtime collaborator John Beck, who played and co-wrote most of her debut album and left her in the middle of 1993.

While her debut album had a plethora of producers, for Bloom Archer and Hughes settled with American producer Mitchell Froom. Recording of the album took place between December 1994 to May 1995, and was recorded at Real World Studios in England and Sunset Sound Factory in Los Angeles. Archer described the recording sessions as "a very relaxed affair".

However, EMI Records were not supportive of the material that Archer had recorded, deeming it too uncommercial and too removed from the sound of her debut album. Archer and Hughes had to fight for almost a year with EMI executives to get the album released in the form they wanted it to be.

== Release ==
When Bloom was finally released, EMI were still not very supportive of it and didn't push a marketing campaign as big as they had done with Archer's debut album, which damaged sales of the singles and the album itself. When released, the album went fairly unnoticed, only peaking at No. 95 in the UK Albums Chart, and the two singles released from the album—"One More Good Night with the Boys" and "Sweet Little Truth"—did not enter the UK top 40. The album was released around Europe and Japan, but EMI America refused to release the album in the United States, and therefore Archer is seen as a one-hit wonder there, with the single "Sleeping Satellite".

Archer, disillusioned with EMI, was let go of by the label in 1997, and would disappear from the music scene for several years until returning in 2006 with her third studio album, On.

== Critical reception ==
Professional ratings
Review scores
Source	Rating
AllMusic	4.5/5 stars
The Guardian	5/5 stars

Upon its release, Caroline Sullivan of The Guardian called Bloom a "jewel", with Archer "sound[ing] simply luscious on some of the most haunting songs you'll hear this year". She also noted Mitchell Froom's "sensitive production" and the "subtle backing" of the Attractions. James Bennett of The Daily Telegraph commented that "thoughtful Beatlesque arrangements grace a suite of unusual, reflective songs whose melodies and structures keep you guessing". He identified both Aimee Mann and Elvis Costello as "obvious reference point[s]" and concluded that a "few listens to Bloom are enough to establish that Archer has a serious talent". Robert Webb of The Independent believed that Archer had "transformed herself into Aimee Mann – no bad thing in songwriting terms" and "crafted 11 tart little vignettes of deception and disillusion". He continued, "It's a songwriter's album through and through – nothing is allowed to get in the way of the songs, and in the songs themselves, nothing is allowed to get in the way of the emotions. It's this immediacy of feeling that sets Bloom apart from most of her peers' work, and which has enabled Archer to handle that difficult second album with a bittersweet grace."

Music Week summarised that it contains "some well-crafted, enjoyable songs", but felt the "downbeat persuasion and Archer's low-key approach may not help it get off the ground" commercially. In a retrospective review, Stewart Mason of AllMusic considered Bloom to be a "huge step up" from Archer's debut album, Great Expectations. He noted how Froom's "sympathetic production brings out the more idiosyncratic elements of Archer's songwriting" and "quite wisely puts the focus squarely on [her] richly expressive voice". He added that Archer's "sweetly introspective lyrics and mildly quirky melodic sense keep Bloom from sounding like just more AAA radio fodder".

== Track listing ==
All tracks written by Tasmin Archer and John Hughes, except where noted.

No.	Title	Length
1.	"Sweet Little Truth"	3:14
2.	"After Hell"	3:07
3.	"One More Good Night with the Boys"	3:43
4.	"Rain Falling"	4:29
5.	"I Like It So"	3:40
6.	"Breaking My Back"	3:26
7.	"I Would Love to Be Right"	4:32
8.	"You Made a Fool of Me"	3:15
9.	"Memory"	3:07
10.	"Give in with Grace"	4:14
11.	"In Your Garden"	3:44

Japanese bonus tracks
No.	Title	Writer(s)	Length
12.	"Guilty"		4:46
13.	"Itchycoo Park"	Steve Marriott; Ronnie Lane	3:10
14.	"Tumbling Tumbleweeds"	Mose Allison	2:41

== Personnel ==
- Tasmin Archer - vocals
- Steve Donnelly - electric guitar, slide guitar
- John Hughes - acoustic guitar
- Bruce Thomas - bass guitar
- Mitchell Froom - piano, Hammond organ, Mellotron, harmonium, Wurlitzer
- Pete Thomas - drums, percussion

with:

- Electra Strings - strings on "Rain Falling" and "I Would Love To Be Right"
  - Caroline Lavelle - cello
  - Jocelyn Pook - viola
  - Fenella Barton, Sonia Slany - violin

Technical

- Tchad Blake - recording, mixing
- Martin Thompson - cover photography

== Charts ==
Chart (1996)	Peak position
UK Albums Chart	95
