= Arienne =

1993 single by Tasmin Archer

Single by Tasmin Archer

from the album Great Expectations
- B-side: "In Your Care" (live); "Man at the Window (live)"; "Real Oh So Real"
- Released: 9 August 1993
- Length: 3:48
- Label: Virgin
- Songwriters: Tasmin Archer; John Beck; John Hughes
- Producers: Julian Mendelsohn; Peter Kaye

Tasmin Archer singles chronology
"Lords of the New Church" (1993)	"Arienne" (1993)	"Shipbuilding" (1994)

"Arienne" is a song by British singer-songwriter Tasmin Archer, released in August 1993 by Virgin Records as the fourth single from her debut album, Great Expectations (1992). Co-written by Archer with John Beck and John Hughes, it became Archer's fourth UK top-30 hit, peaking at No. 30. Five instruments were used in the recording of the track. Hughes, Elliott Randall and Robbie McIntosh provided the guitars, whereas Beck and Paul Wickens played keyboards. The drummer was Charlie Morgan whilst Peter Kaye played Fairlight. Wickens also played accordion on the track.

== Critical reception ==
Alan Jones from Music Week gave "Arienne" three out of five, writing, "Both the title and the way it is sung echo Dean Friedman's "Ariel". Attractive touches, including an a capella intro and the use of an accordion, plus Tasmin's appealing voice win the day. With the subject matter less harrowing than the stark "In Your Care" (reprised here live) it should do fairly well." Tony Cross from Smash Hits also gave the song three out of five, writing, "Though she's still struggling to top "Sleeping Satellite", this is certainly her freshest and sweetest sounding single since - simple but solid quality pop fare. Tasmin takes the listener into a dreamy world of a catchy chorus and friendly flowing chords."

== Track listings ==
- CD single
1. "Arienne"
2. "In Your Care" (live)
3. "Man at the Window" (live)
- 7-inch vinyl
1. "Arienne"
2. "In Your Care" (live)

== Charts ==
Chart (1993)	Peak position
Europe (Eurochart Hot 100)	84
Iceland (Íslenski Listinn Topp 40)	29
UK Singles (OCC)	30
UK Airplay (Music Week)	6
