= Shipbuilding (album) =

1994 album by Tasmin Archer

Studio album / Live album by Tasmin Archer
- Released: 1994
- Recorded: 1993
- Genre: Soul; pop; pop rock
- Length: 34:43
- Label: SBK
- Producer: John Hughes (track 8), Julian Mendelsohn (tracks 1–4)

Tasmin Archer chronology
Great Expectations (1992)	Shipbuilding (1994)	Bloom (1996)

Singles from Shipbuilding
- 1. "Shipbuilding" Released: 1994

Shipbuilding is a mini album by the English singer Tasmin Archer, released in the US in 1994. Archer decided to follow up her successful 1992 debut Great Expectations with an EP of four covers of songs written by Elvis Costello, which was released in January 1994 in the singer's homeland of the UK. The four-track EP peaked at No. 40 on the UK Singles Chart. Costello admired the covers.

SBK Records, Archer's label in North America, decided to release the EP as a full eight-track album instead, and to fill the space they included four live tracks. The eight-track album was not released in the UK.

== Critical reception ==
Professional ratings
Review scores
Source	Rating
AllMusic	3/5 stars
The Indianapolis Star	2.5/4 stars

The Guardian wrote: "'Shipbuilding' and 'New Amsterdam', two of this overrated songwriter's most boring compositions, blossom under Archer's caressing voice and the piano softly tinkling in the background." The Boston Globe determined that "the melodic, piano-based 'When It Comes Right Down to It' is the standout."

AllMusic wrote that "none of the originals are bad; they're all fair to good, and the Costello covers are very powerful."

== Track listing ==
1. "Shipbuilding" (Clive Langer, Elvis Costello) - 4:53
2. "Deep Dark Truthful Mirror" (Declan Patrick Aloysius MacManus) - 4:02
3. "All Grown Up" (Declan Patrick Aloysius MacManus) - 4:12
4. "New Amsterdam" (Elvis Costello) - 3:28
5. "Lords of the New Church" (John Beck, John Hughes, Archer) - (live) 5:13
6. "When It Comes Down to It" (John Beck, John Hughes, Archer) - (live) 4:40
7. "Steeltown" (John Beck, John Hughes, Archer) - (live) 4:49
8. "Sleeping Satellite" (John Beck, John Hughes, Archer) - (acoustic version) 3:26

== Personnel ==
- Tasmin Archer - vocals
- John Hughes, Mark Hornby (tracks 5–7) - guitar
- Marcus Cliffe - bass
- B.J. Cole - pedal steel guitar (tracks 1–4)
- Alan Clark - piano, Hammond organ (tracks 1–4)
- John Beck - keyboards (tracks 5–8)
- Charlie Morgan (tracks 1–4), Frank Tontoh (tracks 5–7), Mike Bedford (track 8) - drums
