= One More Good Night with the Boys =

1996 single by Tasmin Archer

Single by Tasmin Archer

from the album Bloom
- B-side: "Guilty"; "All Grown Up"; "Tumbling Tumbleweeds"; "Deep Dark Truthful Mirror"
- Released: 4 March 1996
- Length: 3:41
- Label: EMI
- Songwriters: Tasmin Archer; John Hughes
- Producer: Mitchell Froom

Tasmin Archer singles chronology
| "Shipbuilding" (1994) | "One More Good Night with the Boys" (1996) | "Sweet Little Truth" (1996) |

"One More Good Night with the Boys" is a song by British singer-songwriter Tasmin Archer, released by EMI on 4 March 1996 as the lead single from her second studio album, Bloom. The song was written by Archer and John Hughes, and was produced by Mitchell Froom. It reached number 45 in the UK Singles Chart.

== Music video ==
The song's music video was directed by Jefery Levy and produced by Joseph Uliano, with Troy Smith as director of photography, for One World Productions.

== Critical reception ==
Upon its release, pan-European magazine Music & Media picked "One More Good Night with the Boys" as their "single of the week" and wrote, "Archer once again proves to be one of the UK's unique vocalists. She walks the narrow, winding path of mixing torch song drama, folky sensitivity and a firm rock base, provided by the Attractions." The reviewer added that the B-side, "Guilty", is "less meandering, a picture perfect ballad full of sweeping emotions". Music Week noted that Archer returns "sounding uncannily like Chrissie Hynde, with a hooky, rocky up-tempo ballad" and added, "'Sleeping Satellite' it is not." The Peterborough Herald & Post awarded the single a three out of five rating and stated that it "marks a distinct change" from Archer's previous releases, with a "rawer approach rather than comfortable pop". The reviewer concluded, "And it works." In a retrospective review of Bloom, Stewart Mason of AllMusic remarked that the single was "clearly aimed at the same demographic that had made Sheryl Crow's 'All I Wanna Do' a hit".

== Track listing ==
Cassette single (UK and Europe)

1. "One More Good Night with the Boys" – 3:41
2. "Guilty" – 4:49

CD single (UK #1)

1. "One More Good Night with the Boys" – 3:41
2. "Guilty" – 4:49
3. "All Grown Up" – 4:12

CD single (UK #2)

1. "One More Good Night with the Boys" – 3:41
2. "Tumbling Tumbleweeds" – 2:41
3. "Deep Dark Truthful Mirror" – 4:04

CD single (Europe #1)

1. "One More Good Night with the Boys" – 3:41
2. "Guilty" – 4:49

CD single (Europe #2 and Australasia)

1. "One More Good Night with the Boys" – 3:41
2. "Guilty" – 4:49
3. "All Grown Up" – 4:12
4. "Tumbling Tumbleweeds" – 2:41

== Personnel ==
"One More Good Night with the Boys"

- Tasmin Archer – vocals
- John Hughes – acoustic guitar
- Steve Donnelly – electric guitar, slide guitar
- Mitchell Froom – harmonium
- Bruce Thomas – bass guitar
- Pete Thomas – drums, percussion

Production

- Mitchell Froom – production ("One More Good Night with the Boys", "Guilty", "Tumbling Tumbleweeds")
- Tchad Blake – recording, mixing ("One More Good Night with the Boys", "Guilty", "Tumbling Tumbleweeds")
- John Paterno – additional engineering ("One More Good Night with the Boys")
- Meabh Flynn – engineering assistance ("One More Good Night with the Boys")
- Julian Mendelsohn – production ("All Grown Up", "Deep Dark Truthful Mirror")
- Steve Fitzmaurice – engineering ("All Grown Up", "Deep Dark Truthful Mirror")

Other

- Martyn Thompson – photography
- Andy Vella – art and design

== Charts ==
| Chart (1996) | Peak position |
|---|---|
| Australia (ARIA) | 189 |
| UK Singles (OCC) | 45 |
| UK Top 50 Airplay (Music Week) | 41 |
