= Gently (album) =

Studio album by Liza Minnelli
- Released: March 19, 1996
- Recorded: 1996
- Genre: Jazz; vocal; traditional
- Length: 42:12
- Label: Angel
- Producer: Brooks Arthur

Liza Minnelli chronology
Paris — Palais des Congrès: Intégrale du spectacle (1995)	Gently (1996)	Minnelli on Minnelli: Live at the Palace (1999)

Singles from Gently
- 1. "Does He Love You?" Released: February 1996

Gently is a studio album by American singer and actress Liza Minnelli. Released in 1996, it is her first album under the Angel Records/EMI label and her first studio release in seven years. The jazz-infused album features romantic ballads and lounge music, with arrangements that include vibraphone, piano, and muted trumpet. Its thematic focus revolves around moments in Minnelli's love life.

The album was promoted as a "make-out album" and its release was supported by an appearance on the UK shopping channel QVC. It became one of Minnelli's most successful albums of the decade, reaching number 156 on the Billboard 200 and number 58 on the UK Albums Chart. In 1997, the album was nominated for a Grammy Award for Best Traditional Pop Vocal Album.

== Album details ==
Gently is a jazz-infused album that also includes romantic ballads and lounge music numbers with arrangements featuring vibraphone, piano, and muted trumpet. Its title and theme reference moments in Minnelli's love life, starting from her adolescence when she had crushes on handsome schoolboys.

The release came seven years after her last studio album, Results, from 1989. During that time, she released the live albums Live from Radio City Music Hall in 1992 and Paris – Palais des Congrès: Intégrale du spectacle in 1995.

== Promotion ==
During the album's promotion, she referred to the work as her "make-out album" due to the irredeemably sentimental themes behind the song choices. She summed up the inspiration behind the album on The Rosie O'Donnell Show when she explained, "There was no romance section [in the record store]. So, I thought, well, maybe I’ll make a record that people can neck to. Remember kissing? Wasn’t kissing great? That’s what this record is about".

As part of the album's promotion, the singer appeared on the UK shopping channel QVC. According to Gilbert Hetherwick, Senior Vice President and General Manager of Angel Records, her appearance on the channel was positive: "She sold thousands of her CD 'Gently' on the network. It's a great way to create awareness, especially for people who live in small towns".

== Critical reception ==
Professional ratings
Review scores
Source	Rating
AllMusic	4.5/5 stars
The Guardian	3/5 stars

Caroline Sullivan of The Guardian gave it three out of five stars.

William Ruhlmann of AllMusic wrote that Minnelli managed to blend her musical heritage with the trends of her generation.

Rennie Sparks of the Chicago Reader gave a favorable review, stating that at 50 years old, Liza Minnelli had finally decided to shed the role of a cheerful and optimistic superstar, delivering somber and profound songs, sung with a solitary and sentimental voice, full of fragility and sadness.

== Accolades ==
In 1997, the album was nominated for a Grammy Award in the category of Best Traditional Pop Vocal Album. The award went to the album Here's to the Ladies by singer Tony Bennett.

== Commercial performance ==
Gently was one of Minnelli's most successful albums on the charts during the 1990s. It reached number 156 on the Billboard magazine's list of best-selling albums, the Billboard 200. In the UK, it reached number 58 on the Official Charts Company's list of best-selling albums.

Gently sold over 100,000 copies worldwide.

== Track listing ==
No.	Title	Writer(s)	Length
1.	"Chances Are" (featuring Johnny Mathis)	Al Stillman, Robert Allen	3:16
2.	"You Stepped Out of a Dream"	Gus Kahn, Nacio Herb Brown	3:39
3.	"Embraceable You"	George Gershwin, Ira Gershwin	4:29
4.	"Close Your Eyes"	Bernice Petkere	3:35
5.	"Some Cats Know"	Jerry Leiber and Mike Stoller	3:47
6.	"Lost in You"	Jerry Leiber and Mike Stoller	4:02
7.	"I Got Lost in His Arms"	Irving Berlin	3:12
8.	"It Had to Be You"	Isham Jones, Gus Kahn	3:32
9.	"Never Let Me Go"	Jay Livingston, Ray Evans	3:15
10.	"Does He Love You?" (featuring Donna Summer)	Sandy Knox, Billy Stritch	4:58
11.	"In the Wee Small Hours of the Morning"	David Mann, Bob Hilliard	4:18
Total length:			42:12

== Personnel ==
- Liza Minnelli – vocals
- Chuck Berghofer, Jim Hughart, Will Lee, Bob Magnusson, Neil Stubenhaus – bass guitar
- Terry Gibbs, Emil Richards – vibraphone
- Albie Berk, John Guerin, John Robinson – drums
- John Tropea – electric guitar
- Chuck Findley, Randy Brecker – trumpet
- Grant Geissman, Michael Landau, Tim May – guitar
- Paulinho da Costa – percussion, congas
- Pete Jolly, Roger Kellaway, Mike Renzi – piano
- Jack Cavari – acoustic guitar
- Gary Foster, Nino Tempo – saxophone
- Robbie Buchanan – keyboards
- Billy Stritch – piano, backing vocals
- Lenny Castro – percussion, congas, timpani
- Melissa Manchester – backing vocals
- Brenda Russell – backing vocals

== Charts ==
Weekly charts for Gently
Chart (1996)	Peak position
UK Albums Chart	58
US Billboard 200	156
