= Lords of the New Church (song) =

1993 single by Tasmin Archer

Single by Tasmin Archer

from the album Great Expectations
- B-side: "Hero"; "Lords of the New Church (remix)"; "Sleeping Satellite"; "Strings of Desire"; "The Higher You Climb (remix)"
- Released: 17 May 1993
- Length: 4:48
- Label: EMI
- Songwriters: Tasmin Archer; John Beck; John Hughes
- Producers: Julian Mendelsohn; Peter Kaye

Tasmin Archer singles chronology
"In Your Care" (1993)	"Lords of the New Church" (1993)	"Arienne" (1993)

"Lords of the New Church" is a song by British singer-songwriter Tasmin Archer, released in May 1993 by EMI as the third single from her debut album, Great Expectations (1992). It was written by Archer with John Beck and John Hughes, and produced by Julian Mendelsohn and Peter Kaye. The song peaked at number 26 on the UK Singles Chart and number 74 on the Eurochart Hot 100.

== Writing and recording ==
Archer describes the song as "it's about the modern breed of politicians and it was written in the very early 1990s even before things became as bad as they are now." Four instruments were used in the recording of "Lords of the New Church", John Hughes, Elliott Randall and Robbie McIntosh provided the guitars in the song whereas John Beck and Paul Wickens played keyboards. The drummer on the track was Charlie Morgan whilst Peter Kaye played the Fairlight CMI.

== Critical reception ==
In his weekly UK chart commentary, James Masterton wrote, "More uptempo than her usual output, the track is very radio friendly and may well equal the success of her last hit." A reviewer from Music & Media said that "Archer marches to rock radio with a midtempo song somewhat in the same vein as latter day Stevie Nicks. Tastes like Jasmin." Damon Albarn and Alex James of Blur reviewed the song for Smash Hits, giving it four out of five. Albarn said, "A nice McTasmin Archer burger, but lacking some of the essential relish."

== Track listings ==
- 7-inch vinyl
1. "Lords of the New Church"
2. "Hero"
- CD single 1
1. "Lords of the New Church"
2. "Hero"
3. "Lords of the New Church" (remix)
4. "Sleeping Satellite"
- CD single 2
1. "Lords of the New Church"
2. "Strings of Desire"
3. "The Higher You Climb" (remix)

== Charts ==
Chart (1993)	Peak position
Europe (Eurochart Hot 100)	74
UK Singles (OCC)	26
UK Airplay (Music Week)	4
