= Paris – Palais des Congrès: Intégrale du spectacle =

Live album by Charles Aznavour, Liza Minnelli
- Released: 1995
- Recorded: November or December 1991
- Genre: Vocal jazz
- Length: 146:04
- Label: Alcinter

Charles Aznavour chronology
You and Me (1995)	Paris – Palais des Congrès: Intégrale du spectacle (1995)	Plus Bleu (1996)

Liza Minnelli chronology
Live from Radio City Music Hall (1992)	Paris — Palais des Congrès: Intégrale du spectacle (1995)	Gently (1996)

Paris – Palais des Congrès: Intégrale du spectacle is a 1995 live album featuring the performers Charles Aznavour and Liza Minnelli, recorded at the Palais des congrès de Paris.

The album features two full sets from the performers, with Minnelli and Aznavour also performing together on several tracks.

== Reception ==
Professional ratings
Review scores
Source	Rating
AllMusic	4/5 stars

The AllMusic review by William Ruhlmann awarded the album four stars out of five stating that "...There's little here one hasn't heard before from Aznavour and Minnelli, so the best moments are the ones when they work together."

== Track listing ==
1. "Prologue" – 1:40
2. "Sound of Your Name" (Charles Aznavour, Herbert Kretzmer) – 4:31
3. "Mon émouvant amour" (Aznavour) – 5:51
4. "Les Comédiens" (Aznavour, Jacques Plante) – 3:14
5. "Sa jeunesse" (Aznavour) – 4:58
6. "Napoli Chante" (Aznavour, Georges Garvarentz) – 5:16
7. "Vous et tu" (Aznavour) – 3:54
8. "La Marguerite" (Aznavour, Garvarentz) – 5:04
9. "Tu t'laisses aller" (Aznavour) – 4:08
10. "Non je n'ai rien oublié" (Aznavour, Garvarentz) – 6:42
11. "Je bois" (Aznavour, Garvarentz) – 3:37
12. "Comme ils disent" (Aznavour) – 4:41
13. "Les Plaisirs démodés" (Aznavour, Garvarentz) – 4:30
14. "La Bohème" (Aznavour, Plante) – 5:23
15. "Je m'voyais déjà" (Aznavour) – 5:33
16. "Pour faire une jam" (Aznavour) – 6:41
17. "Bonjour Paris" (Roger Edens, Kay Thompson) – 3:04
18. "God Bless the Child" (Arthur Herzog, Jr., Billie Holiday) – 3:28
19. "Old Friend" (Stephen Sondheim) – 3:04
20. "Liza with a Z" (Fred Ebb, John Kander) – 3:48
21. "Sailor Boys" (Aznavour, Kretzmer) – 5:12
22. "Some People" (Sondheim, Jule Styne) – 3:53
23. "J'ai deux amours" (Georges Koger, John Murray, Vincent Scotto, Barry Trivers, Henri Eugene Vantard) – 5:02
24. "Stepping Out" (Ebb, Kander) – 7:54
25. "Losing My Mind" (Sondheim) – 4:07
26. "I Love a Piano" (Irving Berlin) – 6:52
27. "Cabaret" (Ebb, Kander) – 3:56
28. "Theme from New York, New York" (Ebb, Kander) – 4:18
29. "Medley" – 15:43

== Personnel ==
- Charles Aznavour – vocals
- Liza Minnelli – vocals

== Charts ==
Chart performance for Paris – Palais des Congrès: Intégrale du spectacle
Chart (1995)	Peak position
Belgian Albums (Ultratop Wallonia)	40
