= Sweet Little Truth =

1996 single by Tasmin Archer

Single by Tasmin Archer

from the album Bloom
- B-side: "After Hell" (live); "Obeah Wedding" (live); "Rain Falling" (live); "Memory" (live); "Breaking My Back" (live)
- Released: 1 July 1996
- Length: 3:15
- Label: EMI
- Songwriters: Tasmin Archer; John Hughes
- Producer: Mitchell Froom

Tasmin Archer singles chronology
"One More Good Night with the Boys" (1996)	"Sweet Little Truth" (1996)	"Every Time I Want It (Effect Is Monotony)" (2006)

"Sweet Little Truth" is a song by British singer-songwriter Tasmin Archer, released by EMI on 1 July 1996 as the second and final single from her second studio album, Bloom (1996). The song was written by Archer and John Hughes, and was produced by Mitchell Froom. It reached number 176 in the UK singles chart.

== Background ==
Archer has described "Sweet Little Truth" as one of her favourite tracks from Bloom. Speaking of the lyrics, she has said, "The whole idea behind it is how people have their own hidden agenda and how they twist the truth to suit that."

== Release ==
"Sweet Little Truth" was released by EMI Records as a single in the UK on 1 July 1996. It followed the top 50 success of Archer's previous single, "One More Good Night with the Boys", but was a commercial disappointment, peaking at number 176 in the UK singles chart. It would also be her last release through EMI and her last single for 10 years. Archer's relationship with EMI became strained after the label deemed Bloom uncommercial and too removed from the sound of her debut album, Great Expectations (1992). Bloom was eventually released a year after it was finished to little commercial success. Archer took a break from the music industry after being dropped by the label in 1997.

== Critical reception ==
Upon its release, Music Week stated, "Archer's admiration for Elvis Costello is much to the fore on this bitter but upbeat ballad which underlines her maturing talent." The Arbroath Herald awarded the song a nine out of ten rating, calling it a "really melodic, attractive number". The reviewer noted that the additional live tracks are "all well worth listening to", but questioned the single's commercial chances, noting that they "fear this single will not sell as it should". Birmingham Evening Mail described it as a "downright funky song that will surprise her fans", but added that the "trouble is the insistent beat gets annoying after a while and sounds like the clockwork drummer your grandad had". Pan-European magazine Music & Media considered it to be a "very hard to pin down, but definitely adult orientated track". They added, "The chorus has some beautiful harmonies with its lush strings, hinting slightly at the Beatles, whereas the melodies and lead guitar in the verses are just wandering around."

In a review of Bloom, Caroline Sullivan of The Guardian described the song as a "lovely thing on which Archer's voice is offset by slide guitar" and added that it "starts the album on a deceptively buoyant note". Simon Ashberry of the Telegraph & Argus called it a "rare upbeat moment which boasts cute sliding guitars and should have been the first single off the album".

== Track listing ==
Cassette single (UK and Europe)

1. "Sweet Little Truth" – 3:15
2. "Memory" (live)
3. "Breaking My Back" (live)

CD single (UK and Europe)

1. "Sweet Little Truth" – 3:15
2. "After Hell" (live) – 3:09
3. "Obeah Wedding" (live) – 4:41
4. "Rain Falling" (live) – 4:48

CD single (Europe)

1. "Sweet Little Truth" – 3:15
2. "After Hell" (live) – 3:09

== Personnel ==
"Sweet Little Truth"

- Tasmin Archer – vocals
- John Hughes – acoustic guitar
- Steve Donnelly – slide guitar, guitar
- Mitchell Froom – piano, Hammond organ, Mellotron
- Bruce Thomas – bass guitar
- Pete Thomas – drums, percussion

Musicians on live tracks

- Steve Donnelly – lead guitar
- John Hughes – rhythm guitar
- Andy Metcalfe – keyboards
- James Blennerhassett – bass
- Pete Thomas – drums

Production

- Mitchell Froom – production ("Sweet Little Truth")
- Tchad Blake – recording, mixing ("Sweet Little Truth")
- Paul Riley – recording (live tracks)
- Steve Fitzmaurice – mixing (live tracks)

== Charts ==
Chart (1996)	Peak position
UK Singles (OCC)	176
