= Minnelli on Minnelli: Live at the Palace =

- Productions: Broadway; December 8, 1999 – January 2, 2000

Minnelli on Minnelli: Live at the Palace

Live album by Liza Minnelli
- Released: February 29, 2000
- Recorded: December 27–28, 1999
- Genre: Show tunes, traditional pop, vocal jazz
- Length: 64:59
- Label: Angel
- Producer: Phil Ramone, Billy Stritch

Liza Minnelli chronology
Gently (1996)	Minnelli on Minnelli: Live at the Palace (2000)	16 Biggest Hits (2000)

Professional ratings
Review scores
Source	Rating
Allmusic	3/5 stars

Minnelli on Minnelli: Live at the Palace was a concert presented by Liza Minnelli at the Palace Theatre on Broadway from December 8, 1999 through January 2, 2000. The show consisted of songs featured in films directed by her father, Vincente Minnelli (1903–1986).

== Production ==
A national tour of 17 cities was planned for the Spring of 2000, but it was cancelled after Minnelli developed hip problems and contracted pneumonia.

Recorded over two nights at the Palace Theatre on Broadway, this was Minnelli's first New York show since her 1992 show from Radio City Music Hall. The show was written and directed by Fred Ebb. Ebb had previously written Liza Minnelli's first club act in 1965, and her 1992 Radio City music Hall show. Minnelli was accompanied onstage by six male dancers.

"The Trolley Song" was performed as an electronic duet with her late mother, Judy Garland, who had introduced the song in the 1944 film Meet Me in St. Louis. The Palace Theatre had been the site for Garland's "comebacks" in 1951 and 1967.

Most reviewers observed an unmistakable degree of vocal decline in Minnelli's performance. However, as Charles Isherwood writing in Variety observed, "she still has a unique instrument that couldn’t be mistaken for anyone else’s, as well as decisive, dramatic phrasing and distinctive elocution. Pure vocal magic is sparse but real, particularly as Minnelli warms up over the course of the evening."

Less kindly, William Ruhlmann at Allmusic.com framed the show in light of Minnelli's recent health and substance-abuse problems, commenting that she had "aged audibly: her voice is weaker, she struggles for breath, and her vibrato is wobbly...If Minnelli informed her work with age and experience, she might develop an interesting autumnal phase". Of her duet with Judy Garland on "The Trolley Song", Ruhlmann wrote that "she passes from self-parody to a kind of pathetic competition she previously avoided. It may be that Liza Minnelli doesn't know how to age as a performer".

== Track listing ==
1. Overture (Marvin Hamlisch) – 0:45
2. "If I Had You" (Irving King, Ted Shapiro) – 3:14
3. "Taking a Chance on Love" (Vernon Duke, Ted Fetter, John La Touche) – 2:43
4. "Love" (Ralph Blane, Hugh Martin) – 3:18
5. "Limehouse Blues" (Philip Braham, Douglas Furber) – 5:27
6. "Meet Me in St. Louis, Louis" (Kerry Mills, Andrew B. Sterling) – 0:42
7. "Under the Bamboo Tree" (Bob Cole, Dink Johnson) – 1:47
8. "The Boy Next Door" (Blane, Martin) – 1:23
9. "Skip to My Lou" (Traditional) – 1:13
10. "Have Yourself a Merry Little Christmas" (Blane, Martin) – 1:40
11. "That's Entertainment" (Howard Dietz, Arthur Schwartz) – 1:58
12. "I Guess I'll Have to Change My Plan" (Dietz, Schwartz) – 2:08
13. "Triplets" (Dietz, Schwartz) – 3:10
14. "Dancing in the Dark" (Dietz, Schwartz) – 1:38
15. "A Shine on Your Shoes" (Dietz, Schwartz) – 5:07
16. "I Got Rhythm" (George Gershwin, Ira Gershwin) – 4:20
17. "Baubles, Bangles, & Beads" (Alexander Borodin, Robert Wright, George Forrest) – 3:56
18. "The Night They Invented Champagne" (Alan Jay Lerner, Frederick Loewe) – 2:13
19. "I'm Glad I'm Not Young Anymore" (Lerner, Loewe) – 3:16
20. "What Did I Have That I Don't Have?" (Burton Lane, Lerner) – 3:57
21. "Thank Heaven for Little Girls" (Lerner, Loewe) – 1:48
22. "The Trolley Song" (Blane, Martin) – 2:43
23. "My Heart Belongs to Daddy" (Cole Porter) – 1:54
24. "I Thank You" (Fred Ebb, John Kander) – 4:37

== Personnel ==
- Liza Minnelli – vocals, liner notes
- Jeffrey Broadhurst, Stephen Campanella, Billy Hartung, Sebastian LaCause, Jim Newman, Alec Timerman – dance, vocals

Musicians

- Sean Smith – double bass
- Ed Xiques – bass clarinet, alto flute, baritone saxophone
- Frank Perowsky – clarinet, flute, piccolo, soprano saxophone, tenor saxophone
- Mark Vinci – clarinet, flute, piccolo, alto saxophone, soprano saxophone
- Mike Migliore – clarinet, flute, piccolo, alto saxophone
- Bill LaVorgna – conductor, director, snare drum
- Russ Kassoff – conductor, contractor, keyboards, piano
- Kaitilin Mahony – French horn
- Bill Washer – guitar
- Bill Hayes – percussion
- George Flynn – bass trombone
- Dale Kirkland, Clinton Sharman – trombone
- Danny Cahn, Ross Konikoff, Dave Stahl – trumpet
- John Dexter – viola
- Ethel Abelson – violin

Production

- Marvin Hamlisch – arranger, conductor
- Billy Stritch – arranger, producer, vocal arrangement
- Rex Reed – liner notes
- Jessica Novod – art direction, design
- Joe Bates, John Harrell – assistant engineer
- Richard Avedon, Joan Marcus – photography
- Phil Ramone – producer
- Ted Jensen – mastering
- Andrew Felluss – mixing assistant
- Fred Ebb – director
- Lisa Brooke – concert master
- Gordon H. Jee – director
- Ken Freeman – editing
- Frank Filipetti – engineer
