= Love Pains =

1979 single by Yvonne Elliman

Single by Yvonne Elliman

from the album Yvonne
- B-side: "Rock Me Slowly"
- Released: 10 September 1979
- Recorded: 18 June 1979
- Genre: Disco
- Label: RSO
- Songwriters: Michael Price; Dan Walsh; Steve Barri
- Producer: Steve Barri

Yvonne Elliman singles chronology
"Moment by Moment" (1978)	"Love Pains" (1979)	"Give It to Me All Night Long" (1982)

"Love Pains" is a dance song written by Michael Price, Dan Walsh and Steve Barri. It was originally recorded by Yvonne Elliman in 1979. Both Hazell Dean and Liza Minnelli covered it and had hits in 1989 and 1990 respectively with their versions. There have also been many other cover versions of this song.

== Yvonne Elliman version ==
=== Background ===
"Love Pains" was a hit for Elliman in 1979, reaching number 34 on the Billboard Hot 100 as well as number 75 on the Hot Dance Club Play, and number 33 on the Adult Contemporary chart. "Love Pains" would be Elliman's final chart single, Elliman's extended hiatus from the music business commencing soon after the release of the track's parent album Yvonne which was the last release of newly recorded music by Elliman until her 2004 EP Simple Needs.

In 1982, Moby Dick Records were in the process of re-releasing remixes of previous hits for their Gold Standard label when Rob Kimbel presented them with a remix of "Love Pains". The remix was released as a single and sales for the Moby Dick 12" single surpassed sales of the original record.

=== Track listings ===
- 12" vinyl, US 1979 US (RPO 1019)
1. "Love Pains" – 5:45
2. "Love Pains" – 5:45
- 12" Moby Dick Records 1982 US (MDR 1201)
1. "Love Pains" (Special DJ Edited Version) – 7:56
2. "Love Pains" – 5:45

=== Charts ===
Chart (1979)	Peak position
US Billboard Hot 100	34
US Adult Contemporary (Billboard)	33
US Hot Dance Club Play (Billboard)	75

== Liza Minnelli version ==
"Love Pains"

Single by Liza Minnelli

from the album Results
- B-side: "Rent"
- Released: 24 February 1990
- Genre: Dance-pop; Euro disco
- Length: 4:10
- Label: Epic
- Songwriters: Michael Price; Dan Walsh; Steve Barri
- Producers: Pet Shop Boys; Julian Mendelsohn

Liza Minnelli singles chronology
"So Sorry, I Said" (1989)	"Love Pains" (1990)	"The Day After That" (1993)

Music video
- "Love Pains" (live) on YouTube

=== Background ===
"Love Pains" is the fourth and final single from American singer and actress Liza Minnelli's ninth album, Results (1989). It was released in the UK in February 1990 by Epic Records. The track was produced by the Pet Shop Boys and Julian Mendelsohn. The single's B-side is Minnelli's take on the Pet Shop Boys single "Rent", which also features on Results.

Steve "Silk" Hurley was commissioned to create several mixes for "Love Pains" which are spread across the single's various formats. The single almost reached the top 40 on the UK Singles chart, stalling at number 41. This was 21 places higher than the last single, "So Sorry, I Said". A performance had been recorded for Top of the Pops, but was never broadcast, until a brief clip was shown during the Top of the Pops: The Story of 1990 special, which was broadcast on 2 October 2020.

=== Critical reception ===
Bill Coleman from Billboard wrote, "Inspired remake of the Yvonne Elliman disco/pop nugget deserves a break. Minnelli's vocal prowess charms and the beat still pumps. Try it out." David Giles from Music Week found that in comparison with Hazell Dean's 1989 version, this song "just twitters away behind Minelli, adding little beside a beat. The song itself is, however, strong enough to make this a hit." Edwin J. Bernard from Number One complimented it as "classic gay disco". Joe Brown from The Washington Post commented, "For once, Minnelli is forced to sing against type, in the breathy, clipped phrases required by dance beats. And because she's singing along with an impassioned background choir, it's easy to imagine her singing along with the song on the dance floor at Studio 54 or Regine's or Xenon. Overwhelmed by the ecstatic rushes and multiple crescendos of electrodisco, Minnelli's unalterably earthbound voice gets lost in the mix, and you can't pick her out of the crowd."

=== Track listings ===
- 7": Epic / ZEE 4 (UK)
1. "Love Pains" (Hurley's radio edit) – 3:54
2. "Love Pains" – 4:10

* also available on MC (ZEE M4)

- 12": Epic / ZEE T4 (UK)
1. "Love Pains" (Hurley's mix) – 5:34
2. "Love Pains" (deep dub) – 4:40
3. "Rent" – 3:54
- 12": Epic / ZEE QT4 (UK)
1. "Love Pains" (deep house pains) – 5:04
2. "Love Pains" (Hurley's radio edit) – 3:54
3. "Rent" – 3:54

* Limited edition gatefold

- 12": Epic / 49-73166 (US)
1. "Love Pains" (Hurley's mix) – 5:34
2. "Love Pains" (Hurley's radio edit) – 3:54
3. "Love Pains" (Hurley's instrumental) – 4:08
4. "Love Pains" (deep house pains) – 5:04
5. "Love Pains" (deep dub) – 4:40
- 12": Epic / 655593-6 (Germany)
1. "Love Pains" – 4:10
2. "Rent" – 3:54
3. "Losing My Mind" (Ultimix dub) – 5:07
- CD: Epic / ZEE C4 (UK)
1. "Love Pains" – 4:10
2. "Love Pains" (Hurley's mix) – 5:34
3. "Rent" – 3:54

=== Charts ===
Chart (1990)	Peak position
Europe (Eurochart Hot 100)	69
Italy (FIMI)	36
UK Singles (OCC)	41
US Hot Dance Music/Maxi-Singles Sales (Billboard)	40
West Germany (GfK Entertainment Charts)	31

== Other notable cover versions ==
Hazell Dean's version, produced by Phil Harding and Ian Curnow, peaked at number 48 on the UK Singles chart in August 1989, number 18 in Dutch Tipparade, and number 51 in Dutch Single Top 100. The single release's B-side track is "More Than Words Can Say".

American singer Viola Wills released her own house cover version of the song in 1989 on Music Man Records. She had a hit with it in Belgium where her version peaked at number 27 on the pop charts.
