= Julian Mendelsohn =

- Born: Australia
- Genres: Pop; rock; electronic
- Occupations: Audio engineer; record producer
- Years active: 1974–present
- Website: morenoiz.com

Julian Mendelsohn is an Australian record producer, audio engineer and mixer.

== Early life ==
After completing school in Australia, Mendelsohn moved to the United Kingdom. He secured his first job in 1974 at Milner Sound, Fulham Road, Chelsea, run by ex-BBC engineer John Milner.

== List of works ==
Mendelsohn was a producer for:

=== Albums ===
- The Firm – Mean Business (1986)
- Pet Shop Boys – Disco (1986)
- Models – Models' Media (1986)
- Pet Shop Boys – Actually (1987)
- Level 42 – Running in the Family (1987)
- Level 42 – Staring at the Sun (1988)
- Pseudo Echo – Race (1988)
- The Blow Monkeys – Whoops! There Goes the Neighbourhood (1989)
- Nik Kershaw – The Works (1989)
- Del Amitri – Waking Hours (1989)
- Liza Minnelli – Results (1989)
- The Associates – Wild and Lonely (1990)
- Dusty Springfield – Reputation (1990)
- Pet Shop Boys – Discography: The Complete Singles Collection (1991)
- Tasmin Archer – Great Expectations (1992)
- Paul McCartney – Off the Ground (1993)
- Tasmin Archer – Shipbuilding (1994)

=== Songs ===
- "Always on My Mind"
- "Arienne"
- "Don't Drop Bombs"
- "Elisabeth's Eyes"
- "Hope of Deliverance"
- "In Your Care"
- "It's a Sin"
- "Lords of the New Church"
- "Losing My Mind"
- "Love Pains"
- "Nothing Has Been Proved"
- "Off the Ground"
- "One More Chance"
- "One Step Ahead"
- "Rent"
- "Say Hello, Wave Goodbye"
- "Sleeping Satellite"
- "So Sorry, I Said"
- "Mother Stands For Comfort" (Kate Bush song) from album Hounds Of Love

== Awards and honours ==
Records on which he has worked have appeared in the British top ten charts. He is best known for producing the work of the Pet Shop Boys, and has also produced music for musicians including Elton John, Jimmy Page, Bob Marley, INXS, Level 42, Nik Kershaw and Paul McCartney.

Mendelsohn was nominated for Producer of the Year at the 1988 British Phonographic Industry awards. He resides in Melbourne, Australia, where he operates MoreNoiz Audio Production.

== See also ==
- Category:Albums produced by Julian Mendelsohn
- Category:Song recordings produced by Julian Mendelsohn
