= At Carnegie Hall (Liza Minnelli album) =

Live album by Liza Minnelli
- Released: September 1987
- Recorded: 1987
- Genres: Jazz, vocal, traditional pop
- Label: Telarc International Corporation
- Producers: Larry Marks, Robert Woods

Liza Minnelli chronology
The Rink (1984)	At Carnegie Hall (1987)	Results (1989)

At Carnegie Hall is the fifth live album by American singer and actress Liza Minnelli. Released in 1987, it marks the singer's first work released under the independent label Telarc Distribution.

The recordings took place over a period of three weeks at the Carnegie Hall concert hall, located in Midtown Manhattan, in the city of New York, in 1987. Minnelli's 17-day residency at the venue became the longest consecutive period in the concert hall's history.

Minnelli performed with a 47-piece orchestra, wearing costumes designed by Halston. The repertoire includes classics from the Great American Songbook, and songs made famous by artists such as Al Jolson, Judy Garland, Ethel Merman, and Charles Aznavour. It also ventures into contemporary pop-rock with the track "Somewhere Out There" by Linda Ronstadt and James Ingram, as well as the compositions of Kander and Ebb, who were highly present in her career. According to critic Stephen Holden, "her songs, imaginatively arranged by Marvin Hamlisch and conducted by Bill La Vorgna, were accompanied by decisive and powerfully illustrative gestures."

The album was released as a double LP/CD, with the complete recording lasting 83 minutes and entirely in digital format. Additionally, a "Highlights" version was released, featuring the album's best moments with an 18-minute reduction in total duration, omitting nine songs in the process and rearranging the remaining ones.

== Critical reception ==
Professional ratings
Review scores
Source	Rating
AllMusic	3/5 stars
AllMusic	(Highlights)

William Ruhlmann of AllMusic noted that the album almost definitively captured the essence of Minnelli's show, blending classic standards with theatrical songs of her generation and contemporary hits, all performed with a full orchestra. Ruhlmann also pointed out that the highlight was the extended medley of Kander and Ebb songs, which brought together iconic numbers such as "Money, Money", "Mein Herr", "Maybe This Time", and "New York, New York", concluding a concert that, according to him, brilliantly summed up Minnelli's career and marked her return to the charts after 13 years.

== Commercial performance ==
On November 14, 1987, the album debuted on the Billboard magazine's list of best-selling albums, known as the Billboard 200, at position number 176, marking Minnelli's first appearance on the chart since 1977, with the soundtrack of the film New York City from the same year.

On November 28, 1987, it reached its peak position on the chart, at number 156. In total, it remained on the chart for eight weeks, marking her best performance in the 1980s before the release of Results in 1989.

== Track listing ==
Side one
No.	Title	Writer(s)	Length
1.	"I Happen to Like New York"	Cole Porter	3:48
2.	"Here I'll Stay / Our Love Is Here to Stay"	Alan Jay Lerner, Kurt Weill / George Gershwin, Ira Gershwin, Oscar Levant, Vernon Duke	5:47
3.	"Old Friends"	Stephen Sondheim	2:51
4.	"I Never Has Seen Snow"	Harold Arlen, Truman Capote	4:13
5.	"If You Hadn't, But You Did"	Betty Comden, Adolph Green, Jule Styne	4:03

Side two
No.	Title	Writer(s)	Length
1.	"I Don't Want to Know"	Jerry Herman	2:53
2.	"Some People"	Jule Styne, Stephen Sondheim	2:55
3.	"How Deep Is the Ocean?"	Irving Berlin	2:35
4.	"I Can See Clearly Now / I Can See It"	Johnny Nash / Tom Jones, Harvey Schmidt	2:39
5.	"Married / You Better Sit Down Kids"	John Kander, Fred Ebb / Sonny Bono	5:17
6.	"Ring Them Bells"	Duke Ellington, Irving Mills	5:46

Side three
No.	Title	Writer(s)	Length
1.	"The Sweetest Sounds"	Richard Rodgers	2:04
2.	"Toot Toot Tootsie"	Ernie Erdman, Gus Kahn, Robert King, Ted Fio Rito	1:25
3.	"Buckle Down Winsocki"	Hugh Martin, Ralph Blane	0:44
4.	"Alexander's Ragtime Band"	Irving Berlin	3:17
5.	"Somewhere Out There"	Barry Mann, Cynthia Weil, James Horner	4:22
6.	"Lonely Feet"	Jerome Kern, Oscar Hammerstein II	2:29
7.	"You Can Have Him / Time Heals Everything"	I. Berlin / J. Herman	4:12

Side four
No.	Title	Writer(s)	Length
1.	"Ebb & Kander Medley I: Liza with a "Z" / All I Need Is One Good Break / Sing Happy / A Quiet Thing"	J. Kander, F. Ebb	5:07
2.	"Ebb & Kander Medley II: Mein Herr / Money, Money / Maybe This Time"	J. Kander, F. Ebb	1:36
3.	"Maybe This Time"	J. Kander, F. Ebb	2:56
4.	"Ebb & Kander Medley III: I'm One of the Smart Ones / Yes / City Lights / But the World Goes 'Round"	J. Kander, F. Ebb	8:02
5.	"Cabaret"	J. Kander, F. Ebb	4:25
6.	"Theme from New York, New York"	J. Kander, F. Ebb	6:36

== Charts ==
=== Weekly charts ===
Chart (1987)	Peak position
US Billboard 200	156
