= In Your Care =

1993 single by Tasmin Archer

Single by Tasmin Archer

from the album Great Expectations
- B-side: "Sleeping Satellite" (remix); "Sea of Rest"; "Ripped Inside" (remix); "Real Oh So Real"
- Released: 8 February 1993
- Length: 4:16
- Label: EMI
- Songwriters: Tasmin Archer; John Beck; John Hughes
- Producers: Julian Mendelsohn; Peter Kaye

Tasmin Archer singles chronology
"Sleeping Satellite" (1992)	"In Your Care" (1993)	"Lords of the New Church" (1993)

Music video
- "In Your Care" on YouTube

"In Your Care" is the second single released from English singer-songwriter Tasmin Archer's debut album, Great Expectations (1992). The song was written by Archer with John Beck and John Hughes, and produced by Julian Mendelsohn and Peter Kaye. It was released on 8 February 1993 by EMI Records, but failed to pick up as much airplay and media support as "Sleeping Satellite", stalling at number 16 on the UK Singles Chart. The song also charted in New Zealand at number 36, but stayed in the top 50 for only one week. The money made from this release was donated to the charity Child Line.

== Song information ==
The lyrics of "In Your Care" deal with the topic of child abuse. CD1 and CD2 of the song were released on two separate weeks. CD1 includes a remix of album track "Ripped Inside" while CD2, the 7-inch vinyl, and the cassette formats include a remix of "Sleeping Satellite".

== Critical reception ==
In his review of Great Expectations, Roch Parisien from AllMusic viewed the song a "more solid" contender, describing it as "sombre-yet-vibrant". Alan Jones from Music Week named it Pick of the Week, writing, "This arresting and powerful ballad has quality written all over it, and should impress radio despite the "Sonofabitch, you broke my heart" line." He concluded, "Another monster, and one which will underline Archer's status as one of the UK's most promising talents." Nancy Culp from NME named it "one of the album's best tracks", noting that it "explores the thorny subject of child abuse in such a from-the-heart manner that the pain and confusion simply leap out and hit you in the tear ducts."

== Music video ==
The accompanying music video for "In Your Care" was directed by London-based director Zanna and produced by Deirdre Allen for M-Ocean Pictures. Released on 8 February 1993, it addresses the sensitive issue of child abuse and does not shy away from using bleak images. Shot in London's Westbridge Studios, the set resembles a stark asylum complete with iron bed. Although filmed in colour, director Zanna achieved a moody atmosphere by draining the various tones to create a muted effect.

== Track listings ==
- 7-inch and cassette single

A. "In Your Care" – 4:22
B. "Sleeping Satellite" (Fitz mix) – 6:15

- UK CD1
1. "In Your Care"
2. "Sea of Rest"
3. "Ripped Inside" (Ben Chapman mix)
- UK CD2
1. "In Your Care"
2. "Sleeping Satellite" (Fitz mix)
3. "Real Oh So Real"

== Charts ==
Chart (1993)	Peak position
Australia (ARIA)	145
Europe (Eurochart Hot 100)	50
New Zealand (Recorded Music NZ)	37
UK Singles (OCC)	16
UK Airplay (Music Week)	26

== Release history ==
Region	Date	Format(s)	Label(s)	Ref.
United Kingdom	8 February 1993	7-inch vinyl; CD1; cassette	EMI	
United Kingdom	15 February 1993	CD2	EMI	
Australia	3 May 1993	CD; cassette	EMI	
