= The Rink (cast recording) =

Soundtrack album by Liza Minnelli and Chita Rivera
- Released: 1984
- Recorded: May 6, 1984
- Genre: Showtunes
- Label: Polydor
- Producer: Norman Newell

Liza Minnelli chronology
Liza Minnelli (1982)	The Rink (1984)	At Carnegie Hall (1987)

The Rink is the original Broadway cast recording of the 1984 musical of the same name, released by Polydor Records in the same year. The album preserves John Kander and Fred Ebb's score, performed by the starring duo of Chita Rivera and Liza Minnelli.

The musical centers on the fraught relationship between Anna, who is selling the roller rink she owns, and her estranged daughter, Angel, who returns home. The recording captures the show's exploration of generational conflict, nostalgia, and reconciliation through numbers ranging from the wistful "Colored Lights" to the explosive "The Rink".

Upon its release, the cast album was met with a mixed critical response. While the performances of its stars were widely acknowledged, some reviewers found the score to be less innovative than the songwriters' previous work and noted that it did not fully showcase the talents of its legendary leads.

== Background ==
The Rink is a Broadway musical with music by John Kander, lyrics by Fred Ebb, and a book by Terrence McNally. Starring Chita Rivera as Anna Antonelli and Liza Minnelli as her daughter, Angel, the show centers on their strained relationship as Angel returns home to find her mother closing the roller-skating rink she runs in a decaying amusement park. Originally written as a vehicle for Rivera, the musical was later adapted to expand Minnelli's role, exploring themes of generational conflict, urban decline, and reconciliation.

Several songs in the score reflect these tensions. Anna expresses nostalgia and frustration in "What Happened to the Old Days?", while Angel opens the show with "Colored Lights", a number later associated with Minnelli's nightclub repertoire. The music combines Kander's characteristic preference for early twentieth-century jazz styles with elements that evoke the setting's working-class atmosphere, including electric guitar passages that suggest urban blight. Other songs, such as "All the Children in a Row", reference the cultural shifts and generational divides of the 1960s.

== Release ==
According to Music Week, the Original Broadway Cast Recording of The Rink was released on compact disc (CD) by That's Entertainment Records at the end of March 1985 as part of the label's ongoing CD reissue program. In October 1999, Billboard reported that Jay Records, the label founded by British producer John Yap, released a newly remastered edition of The Rink Original Broadway Cast Recording.

== Critical reception ==
Professional ratings
Review scores
Source	Rating
AllMusic	3/5 stars
Music Week	3/5 stars
Cast Album Reviews	4/5 stars

William Ruhlmann of AllMusic described The Rink as a work marked by the bitter and ironic tone of composers John Kander and Fred Ebb, more concerned with reflecting generational tensions than offering musical innovation. According to him, the songs, with a sound inspired by the jazz of the 1920s and 1930s, feel familiar within the duo's repertoire, and the musical conveys a skeptical view of both the youth of the 1960s and the adult world.

Billboard noted that the score of The Rink was "perhaps too talky" and suggested that composers John Kander and Fred Ebb did not fully take advantage of the abilities of its leading stars, Liza Minnelli and Chita Rivera.

David Barbour of Cast Album Reviews praised the cast album as an irresistible showcase for Chita Rivera and Liza Minnelli, highlighting Rivera's sardonic and heartfelt performances in numbers like "Chief Cook and Bottle Washer" and "We Can Make It", and Minnelli's moving and whimsical interpretations in "Colored Lights" and "Angel's Rink and Social Center". He noted the strong chemistry between the two stars in duets such as "Don't Ah Ma Me", "The Apple Doesn't Fall", and "Wallflower", and described the score by Kander and Ebb as expertly tailored to their talents. Barbour considered the ensemble numbers, particularly "Mrs. A", to be dramatically effective, and despite some less convincing moments, he concluded that the album offered numerous glitzy pleasures for fans of Broadway divas.

== Track listing ==
The Rink – Original Broadway Cast
No.	Title	Writer(s)	Vocals	Length
1.	"Colored Lights"	John Kander, Fred Ebb	Liza Minnelli	5:32
2.	"Chief Cook and Bottle Washer"	John Kander, Fred Ebb	Chita Rivera	3:55
3.	"Don't Ah, Ma Me"	John Kander, Fred Ebb	Chita Rivera, Liza Minnelli	2:33
4.	"Blue Crystal"	John Kander, Fred Ebb	Chita Rivera, Scott Holmes	2:58
5.	"Under the Rollercoaster"	John Kander, Fred Ebb	Liza Minnelli	2:03
6.	"Not Enough Magic"	John Kander, Fred Ebb	Chita Rivera, Frank Mastrocola, Jason Alexander, Liza Minnelli, Mel Johnson Jr., Ronn Carroll, Scott Ellis, Scott Holmes	4:18
7.	"We Can Make It"	John Kander, Fred Ebb	Chita Rivera	3:29
8.	"After All These Years"	John Kander, Fred Ebb	The Wreckers	3:55
9.	"Angel's Rink and Social Center"	John Kander, Fred Ebb	Liza Minnelli, The Wreckers	3:08
10.	"What Happened to the Old Days?"	John Kander, Fred Ebb	Chita Rivera, Mel Johnson Jr., Ronn Carroll	3:40
11.	"The Apple Doesn't Fall"	John Kander, Fred Ebb	Chita Rivera, Liza Minnelli	4:19
12.	"Marry Me"	John Kander, Fred Ebb	Jason Alexander	3:10
13.	"Mrs. A"	John Kander, Fred Ebb	Chita Rivera, Jason Alexander, Liza Minnelli	3:50
14.	"The Rink"	John Kander, Fred Ebb	The Wreckers	3:40
15.	"Wallflower"	John Kander, Fred Ebb	Chita Rivera, Liza Minnelli	2:12
16.	"All the Children in a Row"	John Kander, Fred Ebb	Liza Minnelli, Scott Ellis	5:57
17.	"Finale"	John Kander, Fred Ebb	Chita Rivera, Liza Minnelli	1:56

== Personnel ==
Credits adapted from The Rink Original Broadway CD (TER – CDTER 1091, Polydor – 823 125–2).

Production

- Musical Director: Paul Gemignani
- Producer for Records: Norman Newell
- Recording Engineer: John Kurlander
- Digital Recordist: Joaquín J. Lopes
- Assistant to the Producer: Gil King
- Music Preparation Supervisors: Mathilde Pincus, Victor Jarowey
- Music Coordinator: John Monaco
- Company Manager: Sue Frost
- Executive Producer: John Yap

Design

- Cover Graphic Design: Bob Gill
- Photography: Ken Howard

Notes

- Recorded at RCA Studios on May 6, 1984.
- Music published by Warner Bros. Music Ltd.
- UK release coordination by David Stoner.
- That's Entertainment Production Ltd. 1984
