= So Sorry, I Said =

Single by Liza Minnelli

from the album Results
- B-side: "I Can't Say Goodnight"
- Released: 13 November 1989
- Genre: Synth-pop
- Length: 3:14
- Label: Epic
- Songwriters: Neil Tennant; Chris Lowe
- Producers: Pet Shop Boys; Julian Mendelsohn

Liza Minnelli singles chronology
"Don't Drop Bombs" (1989)	"So Sorry, I Said" (1989)	"Love Pains" (1990)

Music video
- "So Sorry, I Said " on YouTube

"So Sorry, I Said" is a song by American singer and actress Liza Minnelli, released as the third single from her ninth album, Results (1989). The song was released on Epic Records on 13 November 1989. It stalled on the UK Singles chart at #62. The original demo recording of "So Sorry, I Said", with lead vocals by Neil Tennant, was later included on the expanded re-issue of their 1988 album Introspective in 2001.

== Critical reception ==
American singer-songwriter Taylor Dayne reviewed the song for Number One, saying, "Liza Minnelli is a bit too theatrical for my liking but you can't deny that the woman has a brilliant voice and she's a real star. I mean a legend you know? I'm not sold on this tune but it's quite pleasant." The magazine's Edwin J. Bernard praised it as "brilliant". Chris Heath from Smash Hits named it "the best thing on her LP", declaring the song as "sad, beautiful and rather fabulous."

== Track listing ==
- 7", Epic / ZEE 3 (UK)
1. "So Sorry, I Said" – 3:14
2. "I Can't Say Goodnight" – 4:52

* also available on MC (ZEE M3)

- 12", Epic / ZEE T3 (UK)
1. "So Sorry, I Said" – 3:14
2. "I Can't Say Goodnight" – 4:52
3. "Losing My Mind" (ultimix) – 6:37
4. "Losing My Mind" (ultimix dub) – 5:07

* also available on MC (ZEE MT3 – "The 12" cassette")
* also available on CD (ZEE C3)
* also available on CD (CPZEE 3 – Limited edition: Blue Xmas card w/CD)

== Charts ==
Chart (1989–1990)	Peak position
Australia (ARIA)	161
UK Singles (OCC)	62
