= Viola Wills =

American pop singer

- Also known as: Viola Wills
- Born: Viola Mae Wilkerson; December 30, 1939; Los Angeles, California, U.S.
- Died: May 6, 2009 (aged 69) Phoenix, Arizona, U.S.
- Genres: Funk, disco, dance, Hi-NRG, R&B
- Occupations: Singer, songwriter
- Instrument: Vocals
- Years active: 1965–2009
- Labels: Hansa, XYZ Music, Wide Angle, RVA Records
- Website: http://www.violawills.com/

Viola Mae Wilkerson (December 30, 1939 – May 6, 2009), known professionally as Viola Wills, was an American pop and R&B singer, best known for her covers of classics and other standards such as Patience and Prudence's "Gonna Get Along Without You Now" (1979), Gordon Lightfoot's "If You Could Read My Mind" (1980), The Drifters' "Up on the Roof" (1980), "Always Something There To Remind Me" by Burt Bacharach and Hal David (1980), the Doris Day single "Secret Love" (1980), Chicago's "If You Leave Me Now" (1981) and Joni Mitchell's "Both Sides Now" (1986). She also recorded one of the few dance versions of the Burt Bacharach and Hal David classic "A House Is Not a Home" (1994), which is a different song from the similarly titled "House Is Not a Home" by Deborah Cox.

Her cover of the Harold Arlen and Ted Koehler torch song "Stormy Weather" peaked at No. 4 on the Billboard U.S. Hot Dance Club Play charts in 1982, the highest position the song has reached since Billboard began tracking music sales in 1947, although the original 1933 version sung by Ethel Waters at the Cotton Club in Harlem and later, the early 1940s rendition by Lena Horne, sold quite well and became much better known.

== Early career ==
Born Viola Mae Wilkerson in the Watts district of South Los Angeles, Wills was married in her teens. She was the mother of six children before the age of 21. In 1965, she was discovered by Barry White, who signed her to Bronco Records and renamed her with the shorter stage surname of Wills, from her first marriage name of Lyons. She started her career at the Los Angeles Conservatory of Music and, over the following years, in addition to working with White, also performed with Joe Cocker, Smokey Robinson and many other established recording artists of the era. While working in London as one of Cocker's backing vocalists (dubbed the "Sanctified Sisters"), she worked on and released her solo debut album of self-penned originals, titled Soft Centers, backed by Cocker's session players.

== Later career ==
Wills' first major break into the mainstream came in 1979 with her cover version of "Gonna Get Along Without Ya Now" (the song's release date was May 14, 1979), which started a string of dance hits. All three of the songs landed Wills in the Guinness Book of British Hit Singles. In 1982, her cover of "Stormy Weather" peaked at number 4 on the U.S. Hot Dance Club Play chart. In 1983, the newly formed record label RVA (Robert Viola Ashmun) released a number of songs, including "Wall", "Space" and "If These Walls Could Speak".

A demand for 1980s music brought Wills back to Europe. She appeared on Top of the Pops (October 11, 1979), Pebble Mill, Soul Train (October 30, 1971 [Season 1, Episode 5], where she performed the song "Sweetback"), Later... with Jools Holland, Ronnie Scott's, and Never Mind the Buzzcocks (February 17, 2003 [Season 12, Episode 7]). Wills had a residency at Joogleberry Playhouse in Brighton, backed on occasion by Brighton-based pianist Tom Phelan and jazz guitarist Shane Hill. She also appeared with the soul fusion band Gonzalez.

Although Wills did not have a mainstream US hit, she was popular among the nation's gay community, and her singles were popular in dance clubs. A number of her recordings are found on various compilations. These songs include "No News Is News", "A House Is Not a Home", "If You Could Read My Mind", "Up on the Roof", "Somebody's Eyes", "Love Pains", "Let's Love Now", "Take One Step Forward" (by Wills and Noel McCalla), and "Always Something There to Remind Me". Her vocals also featured on My Friend Sam's 1992 house track "It's My Pleasure", which later appeared on Renaissance: The Mix Collection (1994).

== Personal life and death ==
On February 21, 1982, in Hennepin County, Minnesota, she married Robert Chappell Ashmun. This was her second marriage. In 1983, the new husband and wife formed the record label RVA (Robert Viola Ashmun).

Wills died of cancer on May 6, 2009, in Phoenix, Arizona. Her funeral was held at the Macedonia Abbey Baptist Church in Los Angeles on May 15, 2009. Her grave remains unmarked.

Viola left behind six children: Vincent, Christopher, Regina, Ladonna, David and Rejal. She had 21 grandchildren and eight great-grandchildren.

== Discography ==
=== Albums ===
Year	Title	Label	AUS
1974	Soft Centers	Goodear Records	—
1980	If You Could Read My Mind	Hansa	76
1983	Space	RVA Records	—
1986	Dare to Dream	Wide Angle	—
"—" denotes releases that did not chart.

=== Compilations ===
Year	Title	Label	AUS
1993	A Portrait: Greatest Hits	MFS Records	—
1994	Gonna Get Along Without You	Unidisc	—
"—" denotes releases that did not chart.

=== Singles ===
Year	Single	Peak chart positions							Notes
Year	Single	US Dance	UK	AUS	NZ	NLD	BEL	FRA	Notes
1966	"I Got Love" northern soul classic/ "Lost(Without the Love of My Guy"	—	—	—	—	—	—	—	
1967	"Don't Kiss Me Hello and Mean Goodbye" / "Together Forever"	—	—	—	—	—	—	—	
1969	"I've Got News For You" / "Sweetback"	—	—	—	—	—	—	—	
1974	"Day in the Life of a Woman" / "Some Other Day"	—	—	—	—	—	—	—	
1977	"Let's Love Now" / "Let's Love Now" (Disco Version)	—	—	—	—	—	—	—	
1979	"Gonna Get Along Without You Now" / "Your Love"	52	8	37	3	7	2	38	From the album If You Could Read My Mind; label: Hansa; Certification: BPI: Silver
1980	"If You Could Read My Mind" / "Up on the Roof"	2	—	80	—	5	23	—	From the album If You Could Read My Mind; label: Hansa
1980	"Love Letters"	—	—	—	—	—	—	—	non-album single; label: Charly Records
1981	"I Can't Stay Away From You" / "If You Leave Me Now"	—	—	—	—	—	—	—	non-album single; label: Hansa
1982	"Stormy Weather"	4	—	—	—	—	—	—	non-album single; label: Sunergy
1982	"The More I See You"	—	—	—	—	—	—	—	non-album single; label: Perfect
1983	"Space"	—	—	—	—	—	—	—	from the album Space; label RVA Records
1984	"If These Walls Could Speak"	—	—	—	—	—	—	—	from the album Space; label: Wide Angle
1985	"Both Sides Now" / "Dare to Dream"	—	35	—	—	—	—	—	from the album Dare to Dream; label: Wide Angle
1985	"Tune In For Lovin'"	—	—	—	—	—	—	—	non-album single; label: RCA
1986	"Hot for You" / "Love Transfusion"	—	—	—	—	—	—	—	from the album Dare to Dream; label: Wide Angle
1987	"These Things Happen"	—	—	—	—	—	—	—	non-album single; label: Wide Angle
1987	"Reggae High"	—	—	—	—	—	—	—	non-album single; label: Island
1989	"Love Pains"	—	—	—	—	—	27	—	non-album single; label: Music Man Records
1989	"Don't Stop the Train" (b/w Phyllis Nelson version)	—	—	—	—	—	—	—	non-album single; label: Public/CBS
1992	"It's My Pleasure" (My Friend Sam feat Viola Wills)	—	77	—	—	—	—	—	non-album single; label: Ex-It/IRS
1993	"I Can See Clearly Now"	—	—	—	—	—	—	—	non-album single; label: MFS Records
1994	"No News Is News"	—	—	—	—	—	—	—	non-album single; label: XYZ Music
1994	"A House Is Not a Home"	—	—	—	—	—	—	—	non-album single; label: XYZ Music
1994	"Something Always There to Remind Me (remix)"	—	—	—	—	—	—	—	non-album single; label: Radio Wave Records/BMG
2012	"Chemical Attraction" (with Wayne Numan)	—	—	—	—	—	—	—	non-album single; label: Lybra Records
"—" denotes releases that did not chart or were not released in that territory.
