= Great Expectations (album) =

Studio album by Tasmin Archer
- Released: 19 October 1992
- Recorded: 1991–1992
- Studio: Sarm West (London, England)
- Genre: Soul; pop; pop rock
- Length: 46:06
- Label: Capitol; EMI
- Producer: John Hughes & Steve Fitzmaurice (track 10), Julian Mendelsohn (tracks 1–9 & 11), Paul "Wix" Wickens (tracks 1, 4, 5 & 11), Peter Kaye (track 2, 3 & 6–9)

Tasmin Archer chronology
Great Expectations (1992)	Shipbuilding (1994)

Singles from Great Expectations
- 1. "Sleeping Satellite" Released: 1 September 1992; 2. "In Your Care" Released: 8 February 1993; 3. "Lords of the New Church" Released: 17 May 1993; 4. "Somebody's Daughter" Released: July 1993 (Germany only); 5. "Arienne" Released: 9 August 1993

Great Expectations is the debut studio album by English singer-songwriter Tasmin Archer, released on 19 October 1992 by EMI Records. The first single released from the album, "Sleeping Satellite", went to number one both in the UK and Ireland, while sitting just outside the top 10 in Germany (No. 12). Three more UK singles were released from the album in the wake of Archer's initial success: "In Your Care" (UK No. 16), "Lords of the New Church" (UK No. 26) and "Arienne" (UK No. 30).

The album was later released in the United States on Capitol Records, and was mildly successful due to the single "Sleeping Satellite", which peaked at number 32 on the Billboard Hot 100. The album itself reached a peak of number 115 in the US. The single and album fared better in other parts of the world, however, such as Australia (single reached No. 14; album peaked at 56).

== Critical reception ==
Professional ratings
Review scores
Source	Rating
AllMusic	4.5/5 stars
Calgary Herald	C+
Chicago Tribune	4/4 stars
NME	5/10
Select	1/5 stars

Nancy Culp from NME wrote, "Tasmin is something of a vocal find, her strong, pure tones can imbue even the limpest tune with pathos. It's when she lets rip with the ballads that she really shines."

== Track listing ==
All tracks are written by Tasmin Archer, John Beck and John Hughes.

Great Expectations track listing
No.	Title	Length
1.	"Sleeping Satellite"	4:41
2.	"Arienne"	3:48
3.	"Lords of the New Church"	4:43
4.	"When It Comes Down to It"	4:10
5.	"Steel Town"	3:44
6.	"The Higher You Climb"	3:58
7.	"In Your Care"	4:22
8.	"Somebody's Daughter"	4:15
9.	"Hero"	4:39
10.	"Ripped Inside"	3:28
11.	"Halfway to Heaven"	4:18
Total length:		46:06

== Personnel ==
=== Musicians ===
- Tasmin Archer – vocals
- Tessa Niles, Carol Kenyon – backing vocals
- John Hughes – guitars, keyboards
- Peter Kaye – guitars, Fairlight programming
- Steve Blades, Robbie McIntosh, Phil Palmer, Elliott Randall, Tony Wimshurst – guitars
- John Beck – keyboards
- Paul Wickens – keyboards, accordion
- Gary Maughn – Fairlight programming
- Danny Thompson – double bass
- Charlie Morgan – Drums

=== Production ===
- Tracks 1, 4, 5, and 11 produced by Julian Mendelsohn & Paul "Wix" Wickens
- Tracks 2, 3, 6, 7, 8 and 9 produced by Julian Mendelsohn & Peter Kaye
- Track 10 produced by John Hughes and Steve Fitzmaurice
- All songs recorded by Steve Fitzmaurice except tracks 4, 5, and 11 (recorded by Julian Mendelsohn).
- Mixed by Julian Mendelsohn

== Charts ==
=== Weekly charts ===
Chart performance for Great Expectations
Chart (1992–1993)	Peak position
Australian Albums Chart	56
Austrian Albums Chart	26
German Albums Chart	34
New Zealand Albums Chart	31
Swedish Albums Chart	38
Swiss Albums Chart	26
UK Albums Chart	8
US Billboard 200	115
US New Rock Albums (Radio & Records)	8

=== Year-end charts ===
1993 year-end chart performance for Great Expectations
Chart (1993)	Position
UK Albums Chart	72

== Certifications ==
Certifications for Great Expectations
Region	Certification	Certified units/sales
United Kingdom (BPI)	Gold	100,000^{^}
^{^} Shipments figures based on certification alone.
