= Tasmin Archer =

British singer-songwriter (born 1963)

- Born: Tasmin Angela Archer; 3 August 1963 (age 63); Bradford, Yorkshire, England
- Genres: Pop; rock; soul
- Occupation: Singer-songwriter
- Instrument: Vocals
- Years active: 1991–present
- Labels: EMI; Quiverdisc
- Website: tasminarcher.com

Tasmin Angela Archer (born 3 August 1963) is a British pop rock singer-songwriter from Bradford, England. Her debut album, Great Expectations (1992), spawned the hit "Sleeping Satellite", which reached No. 1 in the United Kingdom and Ireland. She won the Brit Award for British Breakthrough Act in 1993 and has since released three more studio albums.

== Early life ==
Archer was born in Bradford, Yorkshire, to Jamaican parents. She attended Grange Upper School and, after leaving, first worked as a sewing machine operator. She attended Bradford College in 1980 to study typing, and later became a clerk at Leeds Magistrates' Court.

Archer joined a group called Dignity as a backing vocalist, and played with different bands around the Bradford area. She helped out at a recording studio in Bradford called Flexible Response Studios, and subsequently began working with musicians John Hughes and John Beck as "The Archers". During this time, Archer developed skills in the music business.

== Musical career ==
=== Great Expectations ===
Archer signed to EMI in 1990 and released her first single, "Sleeping Satellite," in September 1992, which went to No. 1 on the UK Singles Chart. The single also enjoyed success in the US, where it peaked at No. 32 on the Billboard Hot 100. The album Great Expectations followed in October 1992. It reached No. 8 on the UK Albums Chart, and achieved gold disc status by December for sales of more than 100,000 copies. Further singles from the album followed, and although they were Top 40 hits in the UK, they did not achieve the same level of success as her début.

Archer donated the royalties from her second single "In Your Care" to Childline. The song was about child abuse. In 1993 Archer won a BRIT Award for the Best British Breakthrough Act. She later joked that she kept her award in her kitchen cupboard and used it for cracking nuts and tenderizing steak.

=== Bloom ===
After disappearing from the limelight, Archer reappeared in 1996 with her second album Bloom. However, the single "One More Good Night with the Boys" failed to reach the UK Top 40, and the album peaked at No. 95. In late 1997, musical disagreements with EMI left Archer somewhat disillusioned and feeling like she had been treated as a commodity. She decided to take a short break from the industry, after being let go by EMI. This break lasted two years.

After the break, Archer felt the time was right to start writing again, but now she was hindered by writer's block. Although this did not prevent her from being initially creative, she found it difficult to finish anything musically.

=== On ===
After working through the block and starting in 2002, Archer and Hughes worked on a new album. Initially this was going to be titled Non-Linear, but later became On.

On was released on 25 September 2006 on Archer's own label, Quiverdisc. It was preceded on 20 September by a download-only single, "Every Time I Want It (Effect Is Monotony)", a radio edit of the album track "Effect Is Monotony".

In 2006 and 2007, Archer released two music videos for the album on YouTube, both directed by British animation director Matt Sandbrook: "Effect Is Monotony" and "Sedan". In 2015, Archer released a lyric video for the song "Take Care".

=== Other work ===
In a 2006 interview, Archer said she and John Hughes were pursuing opportunities to write for film and TV soundtracks. Subsequently, the partners provided work for EastEnders and other shows.

=== A Cauldron of Random Notes (2025) ===
In late 2024, Archer mentioned the name of her new album, A Cauldron of Random Notes. On 17 June 2025, she mentioned that the first single, "Vibration of Life" would be released on 20 June 2025.

"Vibration of Life" was released across streaming platforms as intended on 20 June 2025, with both an official music video and lyric video shared on YouTube. "Segregation Seeds" is the name of the second single, similarly released on 8 August 2025. The third single, "Free Fall", was released on 3 September 2025.

A Cauldron of Random Notes was released on 12 September 2025. Pre-ordering fans had the opportunity to win one of two unique hand-painted tambourines signed by Archer.

== Awards and nominations ==
Year	Awards	Work	Category	Result	Ref.
1993	Brit Awards	Herself	British Breakthrough Act	Won	
1993	Brit Awards	Herself	British Female Solo Artist	Nominated	
1993	Brit Awards	"Sleeping Satellite"	British Video of the Year	Nominated	
1993	MTV Video Music Awards	"Sleeping Satellite"	Best New Artist in a Video	Nominated	
1993	MTV Video Music Awards	"Sleeping Satellite"	Best Editing in a Video	Nominated	
1993	RSH Gold Awards	Herself	Power Groove of the Year	Won	

== Discography ==
=== Studio albums ===
Year	Album	Peak positions								Certifications
Year	Album	UK	AUS	AUT	GER	NZ	SWE	SWI	US	Certifications
1992	Great Expectations	8	56	26	34	31	38	26	115	BPI: Gold
1994	Shipbuilding (8-track mini album, US only)	—	—	—	—	—	—	—	—	
1996	Bloom	95	—	—	—	—	—	—	—	
2006	On	—	—	—	—	—	—	—	—	
2025	A Cauldron of Random Notes	— (Note: A Cauldron of Random Notes did not enter the UK Albums Chart, but did peak at No. 27 on the Official Record Store Chart.)	—	—	—	—	—	—	—	
"—" denotes releases that did not chart or were not released.

=== Compilations ===
- Premium Gold Collection (2000)
- Singer/Songwriter (2004)
- The Best Of (2009)
- Sweet Little Truths: The EMI Recordings 1992–1996 (2020) – 3-CD set containing remastered, expanded versions of Great Expectations and Bloom plus B-sides, remixes and live versions.

=== Singles ===
Year	Single	Peak positions										Certifications	Album
Year	Single	UK	AUS	FRA	GER	IRE	NL	NZ	SWE	SWI	US	Certifications	Album
1992	"Sleeping Satellite"	1	14	6	12	1	8	12	4	5	32	BPI: Silver	Great Expectations
1993	"In Your Care"	16	145	—	—	—	—	37	—	—	—		Great Expectations
1993	"Lords of the New Church"	26	—	—	—	—	—	40	—	—	—		Great Expectations
1993	"Somebody's Daughter" (Germany only)	—	—	—	57	—	—	—	—	—	—		Great Expectations
1993	"Arienne"	30	—	—	—	—	—	—	—	—	—		Great Expectations
1994	"Shipbuilding" (4-track EP)	40	—	—	—	—	—	—	—	—	—		Shipbuilding
1996	"One More Good Night with the Boys"	45	189	—	—	—	—	—	—	—	—		Bloom
1996	"Sweet Little Truth"	176	—	—	—	—	—	—	—	—	—		Bloom
2006	"Every Time I Want It (Effect Is Monotony)" (digital download)	—	—	—	—	—	—	—	—	—	—		On
2025	"Vibration of Life"	—	—	—	—	—	—	—	—	—	—		A Cauldron of Random Notes
2025	"Segregation Seeds"	—	—	—	—	—	—	—	—	—	—		A Cauldron of Random Notes
2025	"Free Fall"	—	—	—	—	—	—	—	—	—	—		A Cauldron of Random Notes
"—" denotes releases that did not chart or were not released.
