= Don't Drop Bombs =

Single by Liza Minnelli

from the album Results
- Released: 25 September 1989
- Genre: Synth-pop; disco
- Length: 3:34 (single version)
- Label: Epic
- Songwriters: Neil Tennant; Chris Lowe
- Producers: Pet Shop Boys; Julian Mendelsohn

Liza Minnelli singles chronology
"Losing My Mind" (1989)	"Don't Drop Bombs" (1989)	"So Sorry, I Said" (1989)

Music video
- "Don't Drop Bombs" on YouTube

"Don't Drop Bombs" is a song by American actress and singer Liza Minnelli, released in September 1989 by Epic (catalogue number ZEE 2) as the second single from her ninth album, Results (1989), produced by Pet Shop Boys and Julian Mendelsohn. Pet Shop Boys also wrote the song. It was popular on the club circuit, but failed to make the Top 40 in the UK, peaking at No. 46. In Finland, it was a top-10 hit. The single would only find its way onto the US club scene as an import and via the DJ subscription remix services Razormaid! and This Is Only a Test.

== Critical reception ==
Larry Flick from Billboard magazine felt the song "deftly straddles the line dividing high camp and pure drama". Dave Obee from Calgary Herald named it one of the "good moments" of the album. Edwin J. Bernard from Number One described it as "aggressive Bobby O-type dance". Siân Pattenden from Smash Hits named it "a disco stomper", adding, "Liza strides through this epic with so much gusto it leave you exhausted. All right, it does sound a tad like 'Left to My Devices' but who cares? It's ruddy marvellous!"

== Music video ==
The accompanying music video for "Don't Drop Bombs", directed by Brian Grant was filmed at Shepperton Studios. It references other music videos and styles of the 1980s including Bananarama's "Venus", a touch of Michael Jackson towards the end, and even a reference to the Broadway Melody ballet from Singin' in the Rain with Gene Kelly and Cyd Charisse. Parts of the video were shot in black and white.

== Track listings ==
- 7" Epic / ZEE 2 (UK)
1. "Don't Drop Bombs" (7") – 3:34
2. "Don't Drop Bombs" (instrumental) – 3:39
- 12" Epic / ZEE T2 (UK)
1. "Don't Drop Bombs" (Extended Remix) – 5:53
2. "Don't Drop Bombs" (dub mix) – 5:44
3. "Don't Drop Bombs" (a cappella) – 3:40
- 12" Epic / ZEE QT2 (UK)
1. "Don't Drop Bombs" (Extended Remix) – 5:53
2. "Don't Drop Bombs" (new 7" mix) – 3:39
3. "Don't Drop Bombs" (percapella) – 3:40
4. "Don't Drop Bombs" (a cappella) – 3:40
- CD Epic / ZEE C2 (UK)
1. "Don't Drop Bombs" (7") – 3:34
2. "Don't Drop Bombs" (Extended Remix) – 5:53
3. "Don't Drop Bombs" (a cappella) – 3:40

== Charts ==
Chart (1989)	Peak position
Finland (Suomen virallinen lista)	10
UK Singles (OCC)	46
