= Results (album) =

Studio album by Liza Minnelli
- Released: 9 October 1989
- Recorded: March–April 1989
- Studio: London
- Genres: Pop; electronic dance music; synth-pop; dance-pop
- Length: 45:25
- Label: Epic
- Producers: Pet Shop Boys; Julian Mendelsohn

Liza Minnelli chronology
At Carnegie Hall (1987)	Results (1989)	Stepping Out (1991)

Singles from Results
- 1. "Losing My Mind" Released: August 5, 1989; 2. "Don't Drop Bombs" Released: September 25, 1989; 3. "So Sorry, I Said" Released: November 13, 1989; 4. "Love Pains" Released: February 26, 1990

Results is the ninth studio album by Liza Minnelli, released in October 1989. It was produced by Pet Shop Boys and Julian Mendelsohn.

The album was a success in the United Kingdom, where it reached number 6 on the UK Albums Chart and was certified Gold by BPI (promoted by the lead single, "Losing My Mind", which reached number 6 on the UK Singles Chart).

The album was re-released by Cherry Red Records, in an expanded edition with 4 discs (3 CDs and 1 DVD), on 25 August 2017.

== Production and release ==
In 1988, Minnelli had expressed an interest in doing a pop album, completely in contrast with her normal output when she joined Epic Records with the help of Gene Simmons. Tom Watkins, the manager of the Pet Shop Boys was in the US offices at Epic around this time, promoting his new band Bros. He heard that Minnelli had just been signed by Epic and suggested that Neil Tennant and Chris Lowe of the Pet Shop Boys could work with her on the album. As it happened, Minnelli had heard their song "Rent" and loved it and was thrilled to hear that they might be interested to work with her. Tennant was already a fan of Minnelli and set about writing some songs specifically for her. In March 1989, Minnelli was on tour in London and recorded the vocals for the album during the day. She was surprised on arriving at the studios to learn that the musical backing had already been recorded, a process she was unfamiliar with. She found working with the duo to be great fun but also challenging, saying that Tennant did not compromise and would push her vocally to ranges lower than she was used to. She was keen to record a cover of "Rent" and also expressed particular satisfaction with the song "So Sorry, I Said", saying that the lyrics were very true to her. In general, she was impressed with the duo's work lyrically, and was very pleased with the finished album.

Of the songs contained, "Losing My Mind" is from the 1971 musical Follies. "Twist in My Sobriety" was originally recorded by Tanita Tikaram, from the 1988 album Ancient Heart. "Love Pains" was originally recorded by Yvonne Elliman, from the 1979 album Yvonne. "Rent" and "Tonight Is Forever" were both originally recorded by Pet Shop Boys from, respectively, the albums Actually (1987) and Please (1986). The Pet Shop Boys demo version of "Losing My Mind" (which had Neil Tennant singing the vocal) was later 'tidied up' and released as a B-side on the Pet Shop Boys single "Jealousy". The bridge to "If There Was Love" features Minnelli reciting Sonnet 94 by William Shakespeare: "They that have power to hurt".

The album title was chosen, at Minnelli's request, by Pet Shop Boys after they heard an offhand comment by their friend Janet Street-Porter regarding some of her clothes ("I call it my results wear 'cause when I wear them I always get results").

== Critical reception ==
Professional ratings
Review scores
Source	Rating
AllMusic	3.5/5 stars
Calgary Herald	C
Number One	5/5 stars
Pitchfork	7.4/10

Edwin J. Bernard of the magazine Number One considered the album "a stunning triumph" and "the best long player of the year [1989], no question". He argued that, whether seen as a Pet Shop Boys record with a guest vocalist or as a pop album from "Miss Showbiz" herself, the result is "magnificent". Although he noted that Liza's theatrical voice initially sounds incongruous with the electronic beats, he believes this combination creates a new sound category, which he describes as "camp pop". According to him, the arrangements and lyrics by Neil and Chris are praised as perfect for Liza, painting word pictures and examining unusual aspects of love for her to interpret.

William Ruhlmann of AllMusic felt that Results was more of a Pet Shop Boys album than a Liza Minnelli disc. He argued that while the singer held her own, for the most part, her voice was swamped by the electronically generated beats and sounds, and she was sometimes even forced to compete with other female voices. He noted that the duo's approach transformed even a theatrical number like "Losing My Mind" into a mainstream dance track. In his view, the album emerged as an unexpected one-off in Minnelli's career, where she essentially served as a vocalist for a project entirely conceived and shaped by the Pet Shop Boys.

Alfred Soto of Pitchfork regarded Results as both 1989's most conspicuous outlier and the quintessential Pet Shop Boys album. He argued that the duo used the project to channel the garish effects and "power woman" tropes they omitted from their own work, finding in Liza Minnelli the perfect "emulsifier" for their vision. He felt that Minnelli, with her theatrical background and "ravaged grace," committed fully to the material, often sounding like someone *acting* a emotion, which he found compelling. Soto concluded that the album's specific alchemy of performer and material was a unique, prophetic success, making a reprise unthinkable.

== Commercial performance ==
The first single released was a decidedly electronic working of the Stephen Sondheim song "Losing My Mind" in August 1989. Minnelli promoted the song on various television shows in Europe and the US. It became a big hit in the UK, peaking at No.6, where she appeared on Top of the Pops that month. The album was released a month later where it also reached No.6 in the UK. Results also reached number 13 in Spain and was certified Gold there. The album was less successful in the United States, peaking only at number 128 on the Billboard 200. Three more singles were released from the album during 1989 and 1990, namely "Don't Drop Bombs", "So Sorry, I Said" and "Love Pains." All of these charted in the UK, though not as high as the first single. The album sold 600,000 copies in Europe only.

== Track listing ==
Results – Standard version
No.	Title	Writer(s)	Length
1.	"I Want You Now"	Chris Lowe, Neil Tennant	4:41
2.	"Losing My Mind"	Stephen Sondheim	4:11
3.	"If There Was Love"	Lowe, Tennant	6:47
4.	"So Sorry, I Said"	Lowe, Tennant	3:14
5.	"Don't Drop Bombs"	Lowe, Tennant	3:39
6.	"Twist in My Sobriety"	Tanita Tikaram	4:51
7.	"Rent"	Lowe, Tennant	3:54
8.	"Love Pains"	Steve Barri, Michael Price, Dan Walsh	4:10
9.	"Tonight Is Forever"	Lowe, Tennant	5:04
10.	"I Can't Say Goodnight"	Lowe, Tennant	4:52

Results – 2005 reissue bonus tracks
No.	Title	Writer(s)	Length
11.	"Losing My Mind" (Extended Remix)	Sondheim	7:01
12.	"Don't Drop Bombs" (Extended Remix)	Lowe, Tennant	5:53
13.	"Love Pains" (Steve Hurley's Remix)	Barri, Price, Walsh	5:34

Visual Results / Results – 2005 re-issue (bonus DVD)
No.	Title	Length
1.	"Losing My Mind" (music video)
2.	"Don't Drop Bombs" (music video)
3.	"So Sorry, I Said" (music video)

Results – 2017 Expanded 4-Disc Edition (Disc 2)
No.	Title	Writer(s)	Length
1.	"Losing My Mind" (7″ Mix)	S. Sondheim
2.	"Losing My Mind" (Extended Remix)	S. Sondheim
3.	"Losing My Mind" (Full Length Ultimix)	S. Sondheim
4.	"Losing My Mind" (Ultimix Dub)	S. Sondheim
5.	"Losing My Mind" (Almighty Club Mix)	S. Sondheim
6.	"Losing My Mind" (Almighty Dub)	S. Sondheim
7.	"Losing My Mind" (Almighty Transensual Mix)	S. Sondheim
8.	"Love Pains" (Steve Hurley's Radio Edit)	S. Barri, M. Price, D. Walsh
9.	"Love Pains" (Steve Hurley's Remix)	S. Barri, M. Price, D. Walsh
10.	"Love Pains" (Deep House Pains)	S. Barri, M. Price, D. Walsh
11.	"Love Pains" (Deep Dub)	S. Barri, M. Price, D. Walsh
12.	"Love Pains" (Steve Hurley's Instrumental)	S. Barri, M. Price, D. Walsh

Results – 2017 Expanded 4-Disc Edition (Disc 3)
No.	Title	Writer(s)	Length
1.	"Don't Drop Bombs" (New 7″ Mix)	Lowe, Tennant
2.	"Don't Drop Bombs" (Extended Remix)	Lowe, Tennant
3.	"Don't Drop Bombs" (Disconet Remix)	Lowe, Tennant
4.	"Don't Drop Bombs" (Exterminator Remix)	Lowe, Tennant
5.	"Don't Drop Bombs" (Peace And Love Remix)	Lowe, Tennant
6.	"Don't Drop Bombs" (Dub Mix)	Lowe, Tennant
7.	"Don't Drop Bombs" (Percapella)	Lowe, Tennant
8.	"Don't Drop Bombs" (Accapella)	Lowe, Tennant
9.	"Don't Drop Bombs" (Instrumental)	Lowe, Tennant

Results – 2017 Expanded 4-Disc Edition (Disc 4)
No.	Title	Length
1.	"Losing My Mind" (promo video)
2.	"Don't Drop Bombs" (promo video)
3.	"So Sorry, I Said" (promo video)
4.	"Love Pains" (UK TV appearance)
5.	"The Day After That" (promo video)

== Personnel ==
- Angelo Badalamenti – orchestra arrangement
- J.J. Belle – guitar
- Danny Cummings – percussion
- Anne Dudley – orchestra arrangement, orchestra conductor
- Donald Johnson – rap
- Carol Kenyon – backing vocals
- Katie Kissoon – backing vocals
- Chris Lowe – keyboards, programming
- Gary Maughan – programming
- C.J. Mackintosh – programming, scratching
- Julian Mendelsohn – keyboards, programming, backing vocals
- Tessa Niles – backing vocals
- Courtney Pine – saxophone
- Andy Richards – keyboards, programming
- Neil Tennant – keyboards, backing vocals, vocoder
- Peter-John Vettese – keyboards, piano

== Charts ==
=== Weekly charts ===
Chart (1989–1990)	Peak position
Australian Albums (ARIA)	94
Dutch Albums (Album Top 100)	92
German Albums (Offizielle Top 100)	47
Spanish Albums (PROMUSICAE)	13
Swedish Albums (Sverigetopplistan)	23
UK Albums (Official Charts)	6
US Billboard 200	128

== Certifications and sales ==
Region	Certification	Certified units/sales
Spain (Promusicae)	Gold	50,000^{^}
United Kingdom (BPI)	Gold	100,000^{^}
United States	—	160,000
Summaries
Europe	—	600,000
^{^} Shipments figures based on certification alone.
