= Rent (song) =

Song by the Pet Shop Boys

Single by Pet Shop Boys

from the album Actually
- B-side: "I Want a Dog"
- Written: 1984
- Released: 12 October 1987
- Genre: Synth-pop; disco-pop
- Length: 5:08 (album version); 3:35 (single version); 7:06 (extended version)
- Label: Parlophone
- Songwriters: Neil Tennant; Chris Lowe
- Producer: Julian Mendelsohn

Pet Shop Boys singles chronology
"What Have I Done to Deserve This?" (1987)	"Rent" (1987)	"Always on My Mind" (1987)

Music video
- "Rent" on YouTube

"Rent" is a song by English synth-pop duo Pet Shop Boys from their second studio album, Actually (1987). It was released as the album's third single on 12 October 1987.

== Background and recording ==
"Rent" was written in 1984. The song is about a transactional relationship between two people. According to lyricist Neil Tennant, the title was chosen for its association with rent boys with the intention of being provocative, but the story he envisioned for the song was about a mistress of a powerful man.

I've always imagined it's about a kept woman, and I always imagined it set in America. I vaguely thought of one of the Kennedys, for some reason, and imagined that this politician keeps this woman in a smart flat in Manhattan, and he's still got this family, and the two of them have some sort of relationship and they do love each other but it's all kind of secret...

The original inspiration for the music was the Italo disco song "I Like Chopin" by Gazebo. According to Chris Lowe, an earlier version of "Rent" was a Hi-NRG track, which they recorded with Bobby Orlando. For the album version, producer Julian Mendelsohn decided that they already had enough uptempo songs for Actually, so keyboard programmer Andy Richards reduced the tempo by half.

== Release ==
"Rent" was remixed in a shortened version by producer Stephen Hague for release as a single on 12 October 1987; it reached number eight on the UK Singles Chart. The song was not released as a single in the United States.

The photograph on the single sleeve (pictured) is of Tennant and Lowe on a train platform at King's Cross station, taken by Eric Watson. The music video was also filmed in that location.

== Music video ==
The video for the song was directed by Derek Jarman. It features two intercut storylines. One, filmed in black and white, shows Chris Lowe arriving at King's Cross station by train and walking past various low-life characters. The other, filmed in colour, features Margi Clarke as the partner of a wealthy man (played by Alexander Thynn, 7th Marquess of Bath), who is hosting a dinner party. The lyrics are sung by Tennant, who plays her chauffeur. The woman becomes annoyed when the man pays her no attention. She then gets Tennant to drive her to King's Cross railway station where she embraces Lowe on the platform.

== Live performances ==
Pet Shop Boys performed "Rent" on Sunday Night at the London Palladium on ITV on 11 October 1987, with Lowe wearing an Issey Miyake inflatable rubber jacket. On their first tour in 1989 to Hong Kong, Japan, and the UK, "Rent" was staged with Tennant interacting with backing singer Juliet Roberts as the characters from the song. During the Performance Tour in 1991, "Rent" was sung by ensemble member Sylvia Mason-James. Subsequent tours have also featured "Rent", including Dreamworld: The Greatest Hits Live in 2022–2026.

== Track listing ==
- 7": Parlophone / R 6168 (UK)
1. "Rent" – 3:35
2. "I Want a Dog" – 4:57
- 12": Parlophone / 12R 6168 (UK)
1. "Rent" (Extended Mix) – 7:06
2. "Rent" (Dub) – 6:06
3. "I Want a Dog" – 4:57
- also available on CD (Parlophone / CD R 6168)

== Personnel ==
Credits adapted from the liner notes for Actually: Further Listening 1987–1988 and "Rent".

Pet Shop Boys

- Neil Tennant
- Chris Lowe

Additional personnel

- Andy Richards – keyboard programming, Fairlight programming
- Julian Mendelsohn – production, engineering
- Stephen Hague – mixing, editing (7-inch single version)
- David Jacob – mix engineering (7-inch single version)

Artwork

- Mark Farrow and Pet Shop Boys – design
- Eric Watson – photography

== Charts ==
Chart (1987–1988)	Peak position
Australia (Australian Music Report)	81
Austria (Ö3 Austria Top 40)	27
Belgium (Ultratop 50 Flanders)	17
Europe (European Hot 100 Singles)	11
Finland (Suomen virallinen lista)	12
Ireland (IRMA)	5
Italy (Musica e dischi)	11
Italy Airplay (Music & Media)	17
Luxembourg (Radio Luxembourg)	7
Netherlands (Dutch Top 40)	28
Netherlands (Single Top 100)	25
New Zealand (Recorded Music NZ)	23
Spain (AFYVE)	21
Sweden (Sverigetopplistan)	19
Switzerland (Schweizer Hitparade)	10
UK Singles (Official Charts)	8
West Germany (GfK)	10

== Cover versions ==
Liza Minnelli performed "Rent" on her 1989 album Results, which was produced by Pet Shop Boys and included additional songs written by them for her.

"Rent" was covered by Carter the Unstoppable Sex Machine and was included as a B-side for their single "R.u.b.b.i.s.h", and was later included in their compilation album This is the Sound of an Electric Guitar. The song is also featured as a live version by Suede, as a B-side on their single "Filmstar" (1997), with vocals by Neil Tennant.

== In popular culture ==
The song plays during a karaoke scene in the 2023 film Saltburn. Neil Tennant commented on the use of the song: "...we've had songs in these two films recently, Saltburn and All of Us Strangers, and that's given us a bit of attention. In Saltburn, they sing "Rent" and it's a karaoke scene, but it's actually part of the plot. That's very rare. The song makes such a sardonic point about his relationship, with the guy in the house.
