= Losing My Mind =

1971 song from musical Follies by Stephen Sondheim

Song by Dorothy Collins

from the album Follies
- Released: 1971
- Genre: Torch song
- Songwriter: Stephen Sondheim

"Losing My Mind" is a song written by Stephen Sondheim originally for the 1971 musical Follies for the character of former showgirl Sally Durant Plummer. The song became a popular top ten hit for singer and actress Liza Minnelli in 1989 on the UK Singles Chart and in Europe. "Losing My Mind" has been covered by many artists over the years.

== Follies ==
=== Background ===
"Losing My Mind" was first performed by Dorothy Collins in the role of Sally Durant Plummer in the original Broadway production of Follies. Other performers who have sung the song in later productions of Follies include Barbara Cook (1985), Julia McKenzie (1987), Donna McKechnie (1998), Judith Ivey (2001), Victoria Clark (2007),Bernadette Peters (2011) and Imelda Staunton (2017).

The song was written as a torch song for the character of Sally to sing in the "Loveland" portion of the musical. The song "expresses her preoccupation with Ben, her idealized lover...With infinite attention to detail, Sondheim leads Sally from sunrise to sleepless night, revealing that every second of her existence is defined by her longing...the number ...explores the extent to which she has lost herself in this make-believe world of undying desire." As originally staged, Sally comes onstage in a "clinging, beaded silver" dress, holding a microphone. The "cute" Sally from Phoenix "has become a languid torch singer." She repeats her lines, reflecting "the paralysis about which she sings...the phrase 'It's like I'm losing my mind' occurs no less than six times."

In the first literary resume of his career, Finishing the Hat, Sondheim reveals that the song is a pastiche of George and Ira Gershwin's "The Man I Love."

== Liza Minnelli version ==
"Losing My Mind"

Single by Liza Minnelli

from the album Results
- B-side: "Tonight Is Forever"
- Released: August 5, 1989
- Genre: Synth-pop; dance-pop
- Length: 4:09 (single version)
- Label: Epic
- Songwriter: Stephen Sondheim
- Producers: Pet Shop Boys; Julian Mendelsohn

Liza Minnelli singles chronology
| "For You, Armenia" (1988) | "Losing My Mind" (1989) | "Don't Drop Bombs" (1989) |

Music video
- "Losing My Mind" on YouTube

=== Background ===
In the UK Singles Chart, the most successful version has been by American singer and actress Liza Minnelli, reaching number six. In Ireland, Minnelli's version reached number two. It was the lead single from her 1989 studio album, Results, produced by Pet Shop Boys and Julian Mendelsohn. The 12" release peaked at number eleven on the Billboard Maxi Singles Sales chart. It also peaked at number twenty-six on the American dance chart.

The Pet Shop Boys demo version of "Losing My Mind" (which has Neil Tennant singing the vocal) was later remixed and released as a B-side on the Pet Shop Boys' single, "Jealousy". This demo version contains a scream that Minnelli opted not to include on her release. The Pet Shop Boys also performed the song as part of their 2022 tours Dreamworld in Europe and Unity Tour (with New Order) in the United States. In 2004, Q magazine featured Minnelli's version of the song in their list of "The 1010 Songs You Must Own".

=== Critical reception ===
David Giles from Music Week stated that Minnelli is "brought back to life" by the Pet Shop Boys on the track. Edwin J. Bernard from Number One described the singer's cover version of "Losing My Mind" as "high energy". Joe Brown from The Washington Post wrote, "Minnelli utterly misses the song's irony and delicacy, playing it instead as if she's literally going nuts, complete with a mid-song electronic freak-out fugue and a spoken soliloquy, guaranteed to raise a camp clamor on the dance floor." When reviewing the single, Phil Cheeseman of Record Mirror wrote that "the Pet Shop Boys are people who understand exactly what pop music's about: nothing. That's why they are so good".

More recently, theater scholar Jordan Schildcrout interpreted the song as a commentary on Minnelli's status as a celebrity in the late 1980s, writing: "I find it easy to imagine Liza singing, 'You said you loved me/Or were you just being kind?' not to any man (as depicted in the neo-noir video of the song), but to the audience and the entertainment industry that gave her a Tony, Oscar, and Emmy by the age of 27 and then dismissed her as a camp joke. That 27-year-old haunts 43-year-old Liza, just as the middle-aged characters in Follies are 'ghosted' by actors playing their younger selves."

=== Track listings ===
- 7" Epic / ZEE 1 (UK)
1. "Losing My Mind" (7" mix) – 4:09
2. "Tonight Is Forever" – 5:03

* also released on MC (ZEE M1)

- 12" Epic / ZEE T1 (UK)
1. "Losing My Mind" (extended mix) – 7:01
2. "Losing My Mind" (7" mix) – 4:09
3. "Tonight Is Forever" – 5:03

* also available on CD (ZEE C1)

- 12" Epic / 49-68858 (US)
1. "Losing My Mind" (extended remix) – 7:01
2. "Losing My Mind" (7" mix) – 4:09
3. "Losing My Mind" (Ultimix) – 7:32
4. "Losing My Mind" (Ultimix dub) – 5:07

=== Charts ===
==== Weekly charts ====
| Chart (1989–1990) | Peak position |
|---|---|
| Australia (ARIA) | 72 |
| Austria (Ö3 Austria Top 40) | 19 |
| Belgium (Ultratop Flanders) | 15 |
| Europe (Eurochart Hot 100) | 22 |
| Finland (Suomen virallinen lista) | 18 |
| France (SNEP) | 42 |
| Ireland (IRMA) | 2 |
| Italy (Musica e dischi) | 20 |
| Italy Airplay (Music & Media) | 8 |
| Luxembourg (Radio Luxembourg) | 2 |
| Netherlands (Dutch Top 40) | 31 |
| Netherlands (Single Top 100) | 36 |
| New Zealand (Recorded Music NZ) | 23 |
| Spain (AFYVE) | 7 |
| UK Singles (OCC) | 6 |
| UK Dance (Music Week) | 12 |
| West Germany (Media Control Charts) | 17 |

== See also ==
- List of performances on Top of the Pops § 1989
