= Live from Radio City Music Hall (Liza Minnelli album) =

Live album by Liza Minnelli
- Released: November 10, 1992
- Venue: Radio City Music Hall
- Genre: Vocal, traditional pop
- Label: Columbia
- Producer: Phil Ramone

Liza Minnelli chronology
Stepping Out (1991)	Live from Radio City Music Hall (1992)	Paris — Palais des Congrès: Intégrale du spectacle (1995)

Live from Radio City Music Hall is a live album and video by American singer and actress Liza Minnelli, released in 1992 by Columbia Records. It was recorded during her highly successful "Liza Stepping Out at Radio City" engagement, which became the highest-grossing live stage engagement in the U.S. that year. The concert is structured in two acts, featuring a setlist Minnelli selected for its narrative quality and reflection of women's experiences, ranging from Broadway numbers to a medley of "masculine" songs performed with a troupe of dancers.

The accompanying television special received six Emmy Awards nominations. While the audio album did not chart on the Billboard 200, the video release reached number 23 on the Top Video Sales chart and was certified gold by the Recording Industry Association of America (RIAA). Critics offered mixed opinions; some praised the arrangements and new material, while others were critical of the vocal performance and repertoire.

== Background ==
Between 1991 and 1996, Liza Minnelli embarked on continuous tours, with her notable shows at New York's Radio City Music Hall. The production, titled "Liza Stepping Out at Radio City," took place between April 23 and May 12, 1991, followed by a worldwide tour and a second return to the iconic cinema and concert venue from January 24 to February 2, 1992.

The concert at Radio City Music Hall is divided into two distinct acts. In Act 1, Minnelli appears alone on stage singing tracks such as "Some People" from "Gypsy," "Old Friend" by Stephen Sondheim, "Living Alone and Like It" by Kander and Ebb, "Sorry I Asked," "Sara Lee," and "Quiet Love" by Charles Aznavour. In Act 2, she is joined on stage by 12 female singers and dancers who rise from the audience. Minnelli and her "devilish divas" perform a medley of "masculine" songs, paying tribute to Bob Fosse and performing "Theme from New York, New York" by Kander and Ebb.

Regarding the song selection in the set list, Minnelli said she chose them because they tell a story. "For me, it's always about what (a song) says and what it represents, both personally for me and for women," she said, taking a sip of her iced coffee. "(Women) have a lot on their minds, and I tried to find songs that reflect that."

The show became the most commercially successful at Radio City not only in 1991 but in the past fifty-nine years, recognized by Billboard magazine as the highest-grossing live stage/engagement of the year in the United States, surpassing even the Rolling Stones.

== Release and promotion ==
With the excellent response, Columbia Records decided to record some of Minnelli's performances to release as her sixth live album. At the same time, the entire show was directed for television by Louis J. Horvitz and was released as a PBS special. The accompanying television special was nominated for a total of six Emmy Awards, including Minnelli's impressive individual performance.

The promotion of the project included an event at the Sam Goody store in Rockefeller Plaza, broadcast live by TeleConcerts from the store's event to the Times Square jumbotron screens.

== Critical reception ==
Professional ratings
Review scores
Source	Rating
AllMusic	4/5 stars
Entertainment Weekly	A

William Ruhlmann of AllMusic wrote that after releasing four previous live albums, it might seem to the audience that the artist didn't need another release of this kind. However, he states that it is in her live performances that the artist shines, and in Radio City Music Hall, there is more than enough new material to justify acquiring another live album by Liza Minnelli. He highlighted the ballad "Sorry I Asked".

People magazine criticized the release, stating that the singer's voice was worn out, and the repertoire was not innovative. They claimed that the singer "seems more concerned with how far her voice can go than how much it can convey." The best tracks were noted as "Sorry I Asked" ("bitter and melancholic") and "Stepping Out" ("infectious and rhythmic").

Linda Sanders of Entertainment Weekly gave it an "A" rating. She considered the show polished to the last detail and "some of the most elegant musical arrangements ever recorded." Regarding Minnelli, she noted that the singer "stands out as a powerful woman" who combines "the intimacy of a nightclub with the splendor of Las Vegas."

== Commercial performance ==
Commercially, the album failed to chart on the Billboard 200. However, the video album (VHS/LD) reached number 23 on the Billboard Top Video Sales chart on January 9, 1993. The RIAA certified it as a gold record in the United States, with sales exceeding 50,000 copies in the country.

== Track listing ==
No.	Title	Writer(s)	Length
1.	"Overture"	John Kander; Fred Ebb	0:54
2.	"Teach Me Tonight"	Sammy Cahn; Gene DePaul	3:51
3.	"Old Friends"	Stephen Sondheim	2:10
4.	"Live Alone and Like It"	Sondheim	3:31
5.	"Sorry I Asked"	Kander; Ebb	3:50
6.	"So What"	Kander; Ebb	4:10
7.	"Sara Lee"	Kander; Ebb	3:17
8.	"Some People"	Sondheim; Jule Styne	5:10
9.	"Seeing Things"	Kander; Ebb	5:53
10.	"Stepping Out"	Kander; Ebb	1:46
11.	"I Wanna Get into the Act"	Marshall Barer, Mary Rodgers	4:21
12.	"Men's Medley"	Various	12:21
13.	"Imagine"	John Lennon	3:36
14.	"Here I'll Stay / Our Love Is Here to Stay"	George Gershwin; Ira Gershwin / Alan Jay Lerner; Kurt Weill	5:30
15.	"There's No Business Like Show Business"	Irving Berlin	0:43
16.	"Stepping Out (Reprise)"	Kander; Ebb	7:27
17.	"Theme from New York, New York"	Kander; Ebb	5:33
Total length:			1:14:02
