= Sleeping Satellite =

1992 single by Tasmin Archer

Single by Tasmin Archer

from the album Great Expectations
- B-side: "Man at the Window" (acoustic)
- Released: 1 September 1992
- Genre: Pop; soul
- Length: 4:42
- Label: EMI
- Songwriters: Tasmin Archer; John Beck; John Hughes
- Producers: Julian Mendelsohn; Paul Wickens

Tasmin Archer singles chronology
"Sleeping Satellite" (1992)	"In Your Care" (1993)

"Sleeping Satellite" is a song by British singer-songwriter Tasmin Archer. It was released on 1 September 1992 by EMI Records as the first single from her debut studio album, Great Expectations (1992). The song was written by Archer, John Beck and John Hughes and produced by Julian Mendelsohn and Paul Wickens.

"Sleeping Satellite" received favourable reviews from music critics and became an international hit. It peaked at number one in the United Kingdom, Greece, Ireland and Israel and entered the top 20 in 13 other countries. In the United States, it reached numbers 32 and 24 on the US Billboard Hot 100 and Cash Box Top 100 charts, respectively. Two different music videos were produced to promote the single: one directed by Laurence Dunmore and another directed by Zanna.

== Lyrics and music ==
Although "Sleeping Satellite" was first released in 1992, Archer and her co-writers, John Beck and John Hughes, actually wrote and composed the song in the late 1980s. It was only when Archer got a record deal that the song saw the light of day.

On the song, John Hughes and Robbie McIntosh played guitar, with John Beck and Paul Wickens playing keyboards. The drummer was Graham Broadhead, while Gary Maughan played the Fairlight. Archer sings backing vocals on the track along with Tessa Niles and Carol Kenyon. The lyrics of the song refer to the 1968–1972 Apollo missions, characterised as "man's greatest adventure"; the "sleeping satellite" is the Moon. In a retrospective interview in 2021 Archer stated that the song was not "a criticism of man’s arrogance in leaving Earth, but more about the lack of further space exploration that might have led to a better understanding of ecological issues".

== Critical reception ==
In his review of "Sleeping Satellite", Steve Morse from The Boston Globe wrote, "Heady stuff for a newcomer, but Archer sounds timeless with her deep, mind-imprinting voice." Kent Zimmerman from the Gavin Report named it "a treasure of a song from England", adding, "As the seconds tick away, the song keeps right on building, with guitars, keyboards and a fantastic chorus." In his weekly UK chart commentary, James Masterton considered it a "classy ballad from a new singer-songwriter". Pan-European magazine Music & Media complimented it as a "brilliant soulful pop song with a slightly spacey production". A reviewer from Music Week called it "stylish", adding that it's "both commercial and credible and should prompt a higher than average take-up for her aptly-named debut album".

Ian McCann from New Musical Express said, "There's no hit here, but given the right bullshit production she could stick out the next 'Damn I Wish Etc'". Another NME editor, Nancy Culp, stated, "Where she scores is when she manages something which is different, such as the haunting 'Sleeping Satellite'". Gerald Martinez from New Sunday Times wrote, "While the lyrics were evocative and interesting, it was the overall feel of the music, plus her low evocative voice, that had a quietly propulsive rhythm that made it special." Nick Duerden from Select described it as "sultry" and "soulful". Charles Aaron from Spin commented, "A British-Jamaican soul stylist (shades of Sade and Caron Wheeler) who makes her velvety voice go scratchy so we'll go weak in the knees, such as on the purportedly eco-conscious line: "Still we try to justify the waste for a taste of man's greatest adventure." Whatever. She could croon in Esperanto about the national debt and I'd swoon."

=== Retrospective response ===
Retrospectively, AllMusic editor Roch Parisien complimented the song as a "hypnotic, fashionably retro-psych-soul beauty". In 2011, Tom Ewing of Freaky Trigger wrote, "This, it seems to me, is part of what 'Sleeping Satellite''s articulating: a sense of disappointment bordering on betrayal that having dreamed of the Moon – or indeed, because it got there – humanity now seems confined to a slowly boiling Earth. This is potent, raw stuff and very difficult indeed to cover effectively in a pop song. And in truth Archer doesn't cover it effectively – the song's ambiguous and flowery, its emotional kick comes from Archer's self-belief more than anything you can read into it. But I have to say I like the idea that she tried."

In 2012, Porcys ranked the song number 59 in their list of "100 Singles 1990–1999", naming it an "ideal pop-soul ballad", adding that "technically, 'Sleeping Satellite' is an elegant blend of acoustics with synthetics, starting from the chic cascade, unloading the pomposity of a piece on a bridge built of psychedelic keyboard variations."

== Chart performance ==
"Sleeping Satellite" was released in the United Kingdom on 1 September 1992 and swiftly rose up the charts, replacing the Shamen's "Ebeneezer Goode" at number one in October. It stayed at the top for two weeks before being dethroned by Boyz II Men's "End of the Road". It also topped the charts in neighbouring Ireland, spending four weeks at number one. It remains Archer's only top-ten hit in both the UK and Ireland to date.

Outside the UK and Ireland, "Sleeping Satellite" topped the chart in Greece and was a top-10 hit in numerous other European countries, including France, Italy, the Netherlands, Sweden and Switzerland. To date, it is Archer's only charting single in the United States, peaking at numbers 32 and 24 on the Billboard Hot 100 and Cash Box Top 100 in June 1993, and number 24 on the Billboard Adult Contemporary chart. In neighbouring Canada, "Sleeping Satellite" reached number six.

== Music video ==
Two different music videos were produced to promote the single: the original video shown in Europe featured Archer, John Beck and John Hughes. At the request of her American label, a different video featuring solely Archer was shot in 1993 for the American market. The European music video was directed by Laurence Dunmore, while the US version was shot by London-based director Zanna.

The original video was nominated for best music video at the Brit Awards, while the American video received 2 nominations at the MTV Awards the following year.

== Track listings ==
- UK 7-inch and cassette single
- US and Australasian cassette single
1. "Sleeping Satellite" – 4:41
2. "Sleeping Satellite" (acoustic version) – 3:21
- UK 12-inch single

A1. "Sleeping Satellite"
A2. "Sleeping Satellite" (acoustic version)
B1. "Sleeping Satellite" (extended version)

- UK CD single
1. "Sleeping Satellite"
2. "Sleeping Satellite" (acoustic version)
3. "Man at the Window" (acoustic version)
4. "Sleeping Satellite" (extended version)
- US CD single
1. "Sleeping Satellite" – 4:41
2. "Sleeping Satellite" (acoustic version) – 3:21
3. Interview
- Japanese mini-CD single
1. "Sleeping Satellite"
2. "In Your Care"

== Charts ==
=== Weekly charts ===
Weekly chart performance for "Sleeping Satellite"
Chart (1992–1993)	Peak position
Australia (ARIA)	14
Austria (Ö3 Austria Top 40)	11
Belgium (Ultratop 50 Flanders)	12
Canada Retail Singles (The Record)	4
Canada Top Singles (RPM)	6
Canada Adult Contemporary (RPM)	23
Europe (Eurochart Hot 100)	7
Europe (European AC Radio)	1
Europe (European Dance Radio)	4
Europe (European Hit Radio)	1
France (SNEP)	6
Germany (GfK)	12
Greece (IFPI)	1
Ireland (IRMA)	1
Italy (Musica e dischi)	4
Netherlands (Dutch Top 40)	9
Netherlands (Single Top 100)	8
New Zealand (Recorded Music NZ)	12
Quebec (ADISQ)	2
Sweden (Sverigetopplistan)	4
Switzerland (Schweizer Hitparade)	5
UK Singles (Official Charts)	1
UK Airplay (Music Week)	1
US Billboard Hot 100	32
US Adult Contemporary (Billboard)	24
US Modern Rock Tracks (Billboard)	12
US Top 40/Mainstream (Billboard)	16
US Cash Box Top 100	24

2025 weekly chart performance for "Sleeping Satellite"
Chart (2025)	Peak position
Israel International Airplay (Media Forest)	20

=== Year-end charts ===
1992 year-end chart performance for "Sleeping Satellite"
Chart (1992)	Position
Canada Top Singles (RPM)	65
Netherlands (Dutch Top 40)	77
Sweden (Topplistan)	48
UK Singles (OCC)	16
UK Airplay (Music Week)	7

1993 year-end chart performance for "Sleeping Satellite"
Chart (1993)	Position
Australia (ARIA)	100
Europe (Eurochart Hot 100)	72
Germany (Media Control)	72

== Certifications ==
Certifications and sales for "Sleeping Satellite"
Region	Certification	Certified units/sales
United Kingdom (BPI)	Silver	200,000^{^}
^{^} Shipments figures based on certification alone.

== Release history ==
Release dates and formats for "Sleeping Satellite"
Region	Date	Format(s)	Label(s)	Ref.
United Kingdom	1 September 1992	7-inch vinyl; 12-inch vinyl; CD	EMI	
Australia	16 November 1992	CD; cassette	EMI	
United States	22 February 1993	Top 40 radio	SBK	
Japan	7 April 1993	Mini-CD	SBK	

== Cover versions ==
- 2003: A dance cover was recorded by British group Aurora featuring Irish singer-songwriter Naimee Coleman. Released as a single in Australia on 23 June 2003, it reached number 60 on the ARIA Singles Chart the following week.
- 2011: British singer Kim Wilde recorded a version for her 2011 album Snapshots.
- 2012: Stereolove (also known as James Fraser) released an electronic down-tempo cover in August. The track reached number one on the Juno Records UK Pop/Trance charts in November 2012, as well as reaching the top on Kiss FM and Joy 94.9 in Melbourne, Australia. The track reached number 23 on the US DJ Pool Starfleet Top 50 Dance chart.
