= John Beck (songwriter) =

British songwriter, producer, keyboard player and guitarist

- Origin: United Kingdom
- Occupations: Songwriter, producer, keyboard player and guitarist
- Labels: EMI Records

John Beck is a British songwriter, producer, keyboard player and guitarist known for his work with Tasmin Archer and Corinne Bailey Rae.

Beck was signed to EMI Records along with Archer after writing her first hit, "Sleeping Satellite", which went on to be a #1 hit in 16 countries. The album sold 1.5 million copies and went on to receive a Brit Award.

Beck has subsequently been Grammy- and Ivor Novello Award-nominated. In 2008, he won ASCAP's Song of the Year award for "Put Your Records On", a song he co-wrote with Bailey Rae and Steve Chrisanthou, performed by Bailey Rae. He also wrote the worldwide #1 dance hit "Gabriel" featuring Valentina Poppalardo, which was remixed by Joe Goddard and featured on Grand Theft Auto V. He wrote and produced Sony signing Indiana's first album No Romeo.

Beck has worked with Sam Smith, Paloma Faith, Ashford & Simpson and most recently ¥$ on Vultures 1 and Vultures 2.

He lives in Leeds with his wife and three children.
