= Buddy's Song =

Buddy's Song may refer to:

- Buddy's Song (novel), a novel by British author Nigel Hinton
- Buddy's Song (film), a 1991 British film, based on the novel
- Buddy's Song (album), an album by Chesney Hawkes, soundtrack to the film
