= Buddy's Song (novel) =

1987 novel by British author Nigel Hinton

- Cover of the first edition
- Author: Nigel Hinton
- Genre: Teenage fiction
- Publisher: J. M. Dent & Sons Ltd (original), Heinemann, Puffin Books, CB Creative
- Publication date: 28 May 1987
- Publication place: United Kingdom
- Media type: Print (hardback, paperback), e-book (USA only)
- ISBN: 978-0460062619
- Preceded by: Buddy
- Followed by: Buddy's Blues

Buddy's Song is a novel written by British author Nigel Hinton. It was first published in 1987. It is the second instalment in the Buddy trilogy, between Buddy and Buddy's Blues, and follows the story of Buddy as he starts to pursue a musical career. The book was adapted into a film, directed by Claude Whatham and starring Roger Daltrey and Chesney Hawkes as Terry and Buddy respectively, in 1991.

== Concept ==
Whilst visiting the set in the television series based on the first book, the author asked why they put a guitar in Buddy's bedroom. The set designer explained that he figured Terry got Buddy a guitar, and he gave up when he could not play it. Hinton liked the idea and worked from there.

== Plot ==
The story begins with fourteen-year-old Buddy Clark who is going to visit his father Terry in prison with his mother, Carol. Yet, Buddy could not get round to see him. Between Buddy's first two visits to the prison, Des King paid a visit to his house offering them an envelope full of £50 notes as an apology for getting Terry imprisoned, but Carol refused to take it. In a math lesson on the last day of term in school, Buddy found a note that read 'Debbie+Buddy=Love'. Buddy supposed that it was referring to Debbie Bishop in his class and he became infatuated with her, but he later learned that it was a joke from his friend, Julius Rybeero. Buddy got bored over the summer holiday with the Rybeero twins visiting relatives in the West Country and having nothing to do, so he got a job sweeping up at a depot.

One day, he found the old guitar Terry gave him for his twelfth birthday and decided to start playing it. When he got his first week's wages, Buddy bought new strings for the guitar along with two music books and a pitch pipe to help him tune it. Buddy got a letter from Charmian Rybeero saying that they would be moving out with their father setting up a new taxi firm with his brother. Carol received a letter from Terry, saying he wanted them to sell his Harley-Davidson motorbike because he did not want it getting rusty although Buddy polished and oiled it all the time. Buddy learned on his fifteenth birthday it was to buy a cassette recorder so he could record himself playing the guitar. Buddy recorded himself singing and playing and gave the cassette to his father for Christmas.

When Terry was released on parole after just over a year, Des King who waited outside gave them a lift home then they went to the pub to celebrate where Des gave Terry the envelope of cash. Buddy and Terry went on a shopping spree with the money where Terry got an electric guitar with an amplifier for Buddy, a camcorder with a video recorder for himself and a coat for Carol. On the way home told Buddy that there was £5,000 in the envelope and the rest was going into savings. Terry tried searching for jobs but was unsuccessful with his criminal record then his probation officer found him a job at an all-night petrol station. Buddy went there to visit him and that was where Terry got the idea of placing an advertisement in the local newspaper offering to film weddings and parties in which Buddy helped him. Terry placed an ad four music papers and the noticeboard in the music shop for musicians to play with Buddy but there were no replies. Terry heard from an old friend called Dougie about a group he knew called the Hi-Tone Four, so he arranged to have Buddy play with them for experience. Buddy practiced with the middle-aged band in the shed at Des King's breakers yard then performed at weddings with them. Terry left his job at the petrol station without notice and started working at the breakers yard. Buddy's parents went with him to dinner with Carol's friend Joyce and came home having a big row. Terry left when Carol said she did not need him. Terry moved into the caravan at the breakers yard and Buddy came to visit him. This was when Buddy came up with the idea for the song "Torn in Half".

Buddy started the sixth form at school after taking his GCSEs in the fourth year. In the common room he met fraternal twins Mike and Jason who also played guitar then he practised with them in the school hall. They searched for a drummer and found an eighteen-year-old milkman called Glenn who joined them and they called the band the Reflections. The band mainly played at youth clubs and Buddy continued playing with the Hi-Tone Four without telling his parents hoping their gigs would not clash. One evening Buddy went with his mother to a meal with her boss Adrian Mandell who she was seeing a lot of. At one of the Hi-Tones' gigs Terry met a woman about fifteen years younger called Dawn who he saw lot of after that but Buddy thought negatively about her as he did with Adrian. When the clash between gigs finally happened Buddy had to tell his father about the Reflections and went there instead. Terry came to the Reflections' gig and met with them afterwards and they agreed to let him be their manager. Terry booked them a session at a recording studio where they made tapes to send to clubs to get bookings. Terry then booked them a tour over the Easter holiday within a hundred miles of their town so Terry and Glenn could go to work and changed the name of the band to Buddy and the Bosses. When Terry was going over the plans for the tour Buddy asked if he loved Dawn and he said that he liked her a lot but did not love her. When the band started performing at local youth clubs again there were two girls who went to the gigs and one of them asked Buddy out on a date. Buddy went with Elaine to the cinema where they kissed. After seven dates Elaine did not turn up and at the next gig she said it was because she did not want to get serious then he dumped her. Terry arranged to have a tour for half term in London and some other Southern cities, a recording session at a studio and a single in the local record shops. When Buddy went to tell his mother the news she said that her boss had been offered a job in London and wanted Carol to come with him. She asked Buddy what he thought but he left it entirely with her. Buddy thought he was going mad with the uncertainty of his future and wrote the song "Brain Train" about it. He also wrote "Nothing Serious" about Elaine.

Buddy wrote to the Rybeero twins about the gig in the West Country on the tour and they came. At the same gig Mike and James met their friend Dave from Plymouth who played keyboard with them in their previous band. They hired Dave to play the keyboard when they recorded "Torn in Half" and "Nothing Serious". Terry filmed the music video for "Torn in Half" at the breakers yard where Paul joined them and a local known as the Video King edited it. Terry bribed the two record shops, that the local paper used to compile their chart, into stocking the single and made sure the local radio stations had copies. Terry requested the single on the radio changing his accents every time and that night it came on. On the day Carol had to hand in her notice she decided not to go to London and told Buddy that she did not love Adrian. The record peaked at number two in the local chart and stayed there for two weeks.

Terry gave the band news telling them he had been in touch with Bobby Rosen who was the managing director of major label XS Records. In their meeting at XS after a tour of the studio Rosen told the band that after finding out Terry had a police record that made them unwilling to do deals with him but they still wanted the band. The band met at the twins house where they had already talked to their parents who suggested they took the offer. Glenn was unwilling to work without Terry and suggested he started a new band with Buddy but did not think they could get anywhere with Terry as their manager. Buddy went to talk to his father about it but could not pluck up the courage. They heard a cry of pain from the office of the breakers yard and went to investigate. In the office were two big men who trapped Des King's hands in a filing cabinet. Terry confronted them with an iron bar and they left. Buddy and Terry helped Des into the van and drove him home where his wife called their doctor. When they got back Buddy told his father about the band's meeting. The next day Glenn came to meet Buddy after school and told him that Terry met him at the milk depot and gave him an envelope. Inside it was the contract the band signed with Terry who tore it in half. Terry later explained that he did not want to stand in their way. The band signed the option with XS in September.

At home Buddy tried to fix a blockage under the kitchen sink and Terry came round to deliver news. Arctic Records talked to Terry and the Video King about working with him. Terry fixed the sink and Buddy invited him to come along for a meal to celebrate his seventeenth birthday. Buddy's parents agreed.

The novel ends with the lyrics for "Torn in Half", "Brain Train" and "Nothing Serious".

== Music ==
Slightly altered versions of the three songs Buddy wrote were used in the film. "Torn in Half" and "Nothing Serious" were released on the Chesney Hawkes album Buddy's Song (known in the United States as The One and Only), which is the soundtrack to the film. "Brain Train" has since been released, along with the other master mixes for the film, on Hawkes' 2022 compilation The Complete Picture: The Albums 1991–2012.
