= Time bomb (disambiguation) =

A time bomb is a bomb whose detonation is triggered by a timer.

Time bomb, Time Bomb, or Timebomb may also refer to:

== Film ==
- Time Bomb (1953 film) or Terror on a Train, a British film
- Time Bomb (1984 film), an American TV film starring Billy Dee Williams
- Timebomb (1991 film), an American science fiction action film
- Time Bomb (1994 film), an Indian Kannada action thriller
- Time Bomb, a 1996 Indian film starring Puneet Issar
- Time Bomb (2006 film), a thriller
- Time Bomb, a 2008 direct-to-video film starring Jake Busey

== Literature ==
- Time Bomb (Alex Delaware), a 1990 murder mystery novel in the Alex Delaware series by Jonathan Kellerman
- Time Bomb (Hinton novel), a 2005 young adult novel by Nigel Hinton
- Time Bomb, a 1955 science fiction novel by Wilson Tucker
- Time Bomb, a 2008 spy novel by Gerald Seymour

== Music ==
=== Albums ===
- Timebomb (album), a 1991 album by U.D.O.
- Time Bomb (Demolition Hammer album) (1994)
- Time Bomb (Buckcherry album) (2001) or its title track
- Time Bomb (Alyssa Reid album) (2014)

=== Songs ===
- "Timebomb" (Beck song), 2007
- "Timebomb" (Chumbawamba song), 1993
- "Timebomb" (Tove Lo song), 2015
- "Timebomb" (Kylie Minogue song), 2012
- "Timebomb" (Walk the Moon song), 2019
- "Time B.O.M.B.", a 2014 song by Nekfeu
- "Time Bomb" (Rancid song), 1995
- "Time-Bomb", a song by All Time Low from Dirty Work
- "Time Bomb", a song by Annihilator from Carnival Diablos
- "Time Bomb", a song by Cane Hill from Cane Hill
- "Timebomb", a song by Coldrain from The Revelation
- "Time Bomb", a song by Ric Ocasek from Beatitude
- "Time Bomb", a song by the Dave Matthews Band from Big Whiskey & the GrooGrux King
- "Time Bomb", a song by Despised Icon from Beast
- "Time Bomb", a song by the Dismemberment Plan from Change
- "Timebomb", a song by Dog Faced Hermans
- "Time Bomb", a song by Sheena Easton from What Comes Naturally
- "Timebomb", a song by 808 State from Gorgeous
- "Time Bomb", a song by Faber Drive from Seven Second Surgery
- "Time Bomb", a song by the Format from Dog Problems
- "Timebomb", a song by Alastair Galbraith and Graeme Jefferies
- "Time Bomb", a song by Goldspot from Tally of the Yes Men
- "Time Bomb", a song by Godsmack from Godsmack
- "Timebomb", a song by In Hearts Wake from Kaliyuga
- "Time Bomb", a song by Jessy Greene from A Demon & Her Lovers
- "Time Bomb", a song by Johnny and the Hurricanes
- "Time Bomb", a song by Lake from Lake
- "Timebomb", a song by Nantucket from Long Way to the Top
- "Timebomb", a song by Ohgr from Devils in my Details
- "Timebomb", a song by Old 97's from Too Far to Care
- "Timebomb", a 2012 song by Pink from The Truth About Love
- "Time Bomb", a song by The Ramones from Subterranean Jungle
- "Timebomb", a song by Royal Crescent Mob from Midnight Rose's
- "Time Bomb", a song by Screeching Weasel from How to Make Enemies and Irritate People
- "Timebomb", a song by Selena
- "Time Bomb", a song by 311 from Universal Pulse
- "Timebomb", a song by Laidback Luke and Jonathan Mendelsohn

=== Record labels ===
- Time Bomb Recordings, a record label

== Software ==
- Time bomb (software), a type of computer program written so that it will stop functioning after a certain date
- Timebomb (video game), a 1984 game for the 16K ZX Spectrum computer

== Television ==
- Time Bomb (1984 film), a 1984 TV film starring Joseph Bottoms
- Time Bombs, a 2008 Canadian documentary
- Time Bomb 9/11, a 2005 Indian television serial based on 24
- "Time Bomb" (240-Robert), a 1979 episode of 240-Robert
- "Time Bombs" (All Saints 1999 episode)
- "Time Bomb" (All Saints 2005 episode)
- "Time Bombs" (All Saints 2008 episode)
- "Time Bomb" (Angel), a 2004 episode of Angel
- "Time Bomb", a 1983 episode of Aura Battler Dunbine
- "Time Bomb" (The Bill), a 2010 episode of The Bill
- "Time Bomb" (The Closer), a 2008 episode of The Closer
- "Time Bomb" (CSI: Miami), a 2010 episode of CSI: Miami
- "Time Bomb", a 1963 episode of Dixon of Dock Green
- "Time Bomb" (Doctors), a 2002 episode
- "Time Bomb" (Earth: Final Conflict), a 2000 episode of Earth: Final Conflict
- "Time Bombs" (Extreme Universe), a 2010 episode of Extreme Universe
- "Time Bomb" (Falcon Crest), a 1990 episode of Falcon Crest
- "Time Bomb" (The F.B.I.), a 1970 episode of The F.B.I.
- "Time Bomb" (Fireside Theater), a 1949 episode of Fireside Theatre
- "Time Bomb" (The Flash), a 2019 episode of The Flash
- "Time Bomb", a 1968 episode of Garrison's Gorillas
- "Time Bomb" (Gotham), a 2016 episode of Gotham
- "Time Bomb", a 1954 episode of The Grove Family
- "Time Bomb" (Hardball), a 1989 episode of Hardball
- "Time Bomb", a 1976 episode of Matlock Police
- "Time Bomb" (Mission: Impossible), a 1969 episode of Mission: Impossible
- "Time Bomb", a 2004 episode of Neighbours
- "Time Bomb" (The Odyssey), a 1994 episode of The Odyssey
- "Time Bomb", a 2011 episode of One Man Army
- "Time Bomb", a 1954 episode of The Philco-Goodyear Television Playhouse
- "Time Bomb" (Sailor Moon), a 1995 episode of Sailor Moon
- "Time Bomb (Shadow Raiders), a 1999 episode of Shadow Raiders
- "Time Bomb" (Special Branch), a 1969 episode of Special Branch
- "Time Bomb" (S.W.A.T.), a 1975 episode of S.W.A.T.
- "Timebomb" (True Blood), a 2009 episode of True Blood
- "Time Bomb", a 1956 episode of Telephone Time
- "Time Bomb" (Vega$), a 1981 episode of Vega$
- "Time Bomb" (Voyage to the Bottom of the Sea), a 1965 episode of the TV series Voyage to the Bottom of the Sea
- "Time Bomb" (Wolverine and the X-Men), a 2008 episode of Wolverine and the X-Men
- "Time Bomb" (Wonder Woman), a 1978 episode of Wonder Woman
- "Time Bomb" (World of Giants), a 1959 episode of World of Giants

== See also ==
- Le vent se lève, a 1959 French-Italian film starring Curd Jürgens
