= Ghost Game =

Ghost Game may refer to:

- Ghost Game (film), a 2004 American film
- La-Tha-Pii or Ghost Game, a 2006 Thai film
- Ghost Game (novel), a 2011 novel by Nigel Hinton
- Digimon Ghost Game, a 2021 anime series
- EA Gothenburg, a video game developer formerly known as Ghost Games
- Ghost (game)
