= Buddy (Hinton novel) =

1982 novel written by Nigel Hinton

- Cover of the first edition
- Author: Nigel Hinton
- Language: English
- Genre: Teenage fiction
- Set in: England, early 1980s
- Published: July 1982, J.M. Dent & Sons Ltd (original); Penguin Books (current UK publisher)
- Publication place: United Kingdom
- Media type: Print (hardback, paperback, e-book)
- ISBN: 978-0460-06089-9
- Followed by: Buddy's Song

Buddy is a novel written by Nigel Hinton. The main characters are Buddy Clark, his mother Carol Clark, his father Terry Clark and Julius and Charmian Rybeero. The story deals with issues such as racism, juvenile delinquency and child neglect.

The book was adapted into a television series in 1986.

It was the first installment in the Buddy trilogy and is followed by Buddy's Song (1987) which was adapted into a film (starring Chesney Hawkes and Roger Daltrey) in 1991 and Buddy's Blues (1995).

Buddy is still widely used in English classes at British and Irish secondary schools, sometimes with the TV series to compare the two media.

== Concept ==
Nigel Hinton had great difficulty trying to start to write Buddy. The story had changed a lot by the time Nigel finished writing it. Buddy was originally nine years old, his name was Stuart, he liked tea, and he thought his cousin was a spy.

== Plot ==
Buddy is a young boy from a low income household. He is neglected by his parents and is often picked on at school for being poor. It all starts when Buddy wants some money to go on a school trip, but he knows that he is unlikely to go as he was unable to go on two previous school trips because his parents cannot afford it so Buddy ends up stealing the money from his mother's purse. His mother soon finds the money missing and asks Buddy where the money is. After admitting that he did take the money, his mum leaves the room, and being angry at Buddy, she replies, "Like father, like son," as his father was previously sent to prison for breaking and entering. Before leaving she adds "thief," and leaves Buddy upset crying. The next day Buddy finds out his mother has left the household. Four months later, with his mother still missing, Buddy is still being bullied at school, often being called dustman by the pupils and even his teacher, due to the state of his clothes. On top of this, Buddy is also bullied because he is friends with black twins Julius and Charmian who are also picked on in school.

Soon, Buddy's father gets a job working a nightshift job, but because he refuses to tell Buddy what it is, which makes Buddy suspicious. That night, he tells Buddy about the address 56 Croxley Street, telling him that the owner of the house killed his wife then hanged himself some 25 years earlier and that the house was said to be haunted. The following night, Buddy tells his friends Julius and Charmian about the house and they decide to check it out. They find the house boarded up but to their surprise they find that someone is still living inside. They decide to come back in the next day and they speak to the woman who lives next door. She knew the owner of number 56 as "The Beast." They then decide to go to the house to investigate again while the owner is out. The owner returns home whilst they are still there. They are terrified at first, but after speaking to the man, they soon find they have nothing to be scared of. In fact, 'The Beast' was just a man with learning difficulties named Ralph James Campbell.

Buddy soon has a parents' consultation evening at his school with Mr. Normington. His father arrives in his 'teddy boy' outfit, and this makes Buddy feel embarrassed. Later that day, his father leaves for work again leaving Buddy in the house alone. That night, Buddy looks out the window, and for a moment he thinks he sees the Beast standing outside of his house. He later hears the door bell ring and to his surprise, it is his mother. She takes Buddy to a snack bar at the bus station and gives him the address to the flat she is currently sharing with a friend from her work and tells him that he can visit her anytime that he wants.

Buddy's father soon gets his motorbike back, a Harley-Davidson which was confiscated before he got his job. In a good mood, he takes Buddy for a ride on the motorbike. They stop and take a break and he plays a few rounds against Buddy on a pinball machine. Buddy's father then goes to work. Later on that night, Buddy wakes to find his father in the bathroom with his hands covered in blood. He claims he fell off his bike, however, Buddy does not believe him. Buddy finds a briefcase behind a door in his house containing jewellery and believes that his father has stolen it. The next day, Buddy talks to his him to come forward about the theft and stolen jewellery. His dad admits that he still continues with his robbery, and this makes Buddy very upset and he starts to cry. Buddy pleads with his him that he stop stealing and his dad tells that him he will try. Buddy's dad asks him to call a man called Mr. King about the jewellery. Mr. King arrives at Buddy's house to discuss privately with his father. Buddy overhears his father telling Mr. King that he does not want anything to do with the thefts anymore, however, Mr. King ignores this and tells him that he will give him until Friday for his hands to get better before they meet next at 56 Croxley Street. Buddy decides that enough is enough and begins to form a plan to get Mr. King arrested. The plan involves keeping his father away from 56 Croxley Street long enough for Mr. King to enter the house. Buddy ensures his father is nowhere near the house at the time by convincing his mother to visit his him. He knows this will keep his father occupied for the time being. Buddy then has his friend Charmian to get Mrs. Solomon to telephone the police and tell them that someone has broken into 56 Croxley street. They hope this will help to get Mr. King arrested.

However, upon arrival to 56 Croxley street, Buddy finds Mr. King leaving Croxley Street before the police have arrived. His plan has not worked.

Buddy's father soon arrives to Croxley Street with Buddy still there. Buddy tells him that he has called the police. Buddy's father enters 56 to check on the owner of the House (Ralph), who Buddy had forgotten about. The police shortly arrive at the house and enter, only to emerge with Buddy's father and Ralph under arrest with the stolen jewellery. They both enter the police car calmly although Ralph hides his head in his hands. Buddy was sure he saw his father put his arm around Ralph. After spending two nights at Julius and Chairman's house, Buddy decides to escape to the country to avoid being put into care. He takes supplies from his house including a sleeping bag, and goes to the bus station and gets on a bus. Although Buddy originally plans to go to West Axle he gets off the bus earlier, just before it gets too dark. When he gets off the bus, he tries to head to a barn, he gets stopped by two big aggressive dogs blocking the way. In the end, he decides to take shelter in the wooden bus stop in his sleeping bag.

The next morning, which also happens to be Buddy's fourteenth birthday, Buddy decides to head to 56 Croxley Street as he knows it would be the last place the authorities would look for him. With the house empty, Buddy succeeds until Ralph returns home. Buddy's father had told the police that Ralph had not been involved with the crimes. After talking with Ralph, he finds out that Mr. King is Ralph's uncle on his mother's side of the family, and Ralph's father was the man who killed himself after murdering his wife. After spending the night at Ralph's house, Buddy decides to go to the place where his mother is staying. There, Joyce (his mother's friend she is staying with) shows Buddy the local newspaper report of him being missing and that his parents are looking for him, now at his house. Buddy goes there to find them (his father being bailed out of prison by his mother).

Six months later, Buddy's father attends his trial for the robberies. He pleads guilty and is sentenced to 18 months in prison. He also asks Buddy and his mum to play a Buddy Holly song every day to remind them of him. (The song they decide to play is "Everyday".) The lyrics indicate to him that his father's release is getting closer and that he still loves them.
