= Buddy's Blues =

1995 novel by Nigel Hinton

- Cover of the first edition
- Author: Nigel Hinton
- Language: English
- Genre: Teenage fiction
- Publisher: Viking Press (original), Puffin Books, CB Creative (current publisher)
- Publication date: 13 November 1995
- Publication place: United Kingdom
- Media type: Print (hardback, paperback), e-book
- ISBN: 978-0670862771
- Preceded by: Buddy's Song

Buddy's Blues is a novel by British author Nigel Hinton which was first published in 1995. It is the third and final installment in the Buddy trilogy, after Buddy and Buddy's Song, and follows the rest of Buddy's life from the age of 18 including his musical career.

== Concept ==
At a swimming pool, the author once saw an old man trying to teach his granddaughter how to swim. This made Hinton wonder if Terry would have done a better job looking after a grandchild than Buddy. Also, the film version of Buddy's Song had just been released. and a song from the film went on to top the charts, so the author combined the two to write Buddy's Blues.

== Award ==
In 1996 the novel won the Stockport Schools' Book Award.
