= The Complete Picture: The Albums 1991–2012 =

Box set by Chesney Hawkes
- Released: 22 March 2022
- Recorded: 1991–2012
- Genre: Pop rock
- Label: Chrysalis

Chesney Hawkes chronology
| Sunset Sessions (2021) | The Complete Picture: The Albums 1991–2012 (2022) |

The Complete Picture: The Albums 1991–2012 is a career-spanning box set by the English singer-songwriter Chesney Hawkes. Released by Chrysalis Records on 22 March 2022 to celebrate Hawkes' 30th anniversary, the box set includes his four studio albums plus a bonus disc with B-sides and remixes, and a DVD containing music videos, TV performances, and rare live footage.

== Track listing ==
Disc 1: Buddy's Song (1991)
| No. | Title | Writer(s) | Length |
|---|---|---|---|
| 1. | "The One and Only" | Nik Kershaw | 3:43 |
| 2. | "Nothing Serious" | Nigel Hinton; John Wesley Harding | 3:34 |
| 3. | "Feel So Alive" | Hinton; Harding | 4:48 |
| 4. | "I'm a Man Not a Boy" | Hinton; Harding; Chesney Hawkes | 4:00 |
| 5. | "It's Gonna Be Tough" | Hinton; Harding | 2:30 |
| 6. | "Torn in Half" | Hinton; Hawkes | 4:02 |
| 7. | "I'm Young" | Hinton; Harding | 4:11 |
| 8. | "Secrets of the Heart" | Hinton; Hawkes | 3:53 |
| 9. | "This Is Me" | Hinton; Thom Hardwell; Alan Shacklock | 3:36 |
| 10. | "Ordinary Girl" | Hinton; Harding | 3:34 |
| 11. | "A Crazy World Like This" | Billy Steinberg; Tom Kelly; Neil Geraldo | 3:37 |
| 12. | "Say Mama" | Johnny Meeks; Johnny Earl | 2:10 |
| 13. | "Waiting for the Night" (Bonus Track) | Desmond Child; Robbie Seidman | 4:04 |
| 14. | "One World" (Bonus Track) | Kershaw | 4:09 |
| 15. | "Torn in Half (Orchestral Mix)" (Bonus Track) | Hinton; Hawkes | 4:04 |
| 16. | "Secrets of the Heart (Live at Abbey Road)" (Bonus Track) | Hinton; Hawkes | 3:12 |
| 17. | "I'm a Man Not a Boy (Film Version)" (Bonus Track) | Hinton; Harding; Hawkes | 3:24 |
| 18. | "The One and Only (2022 Nik Kershaw Remix)" (Spotify/Apple Music/Amazon Music Exclusive Bonus Track) | Kershaw | 4:25 |
| 19. | "The One and Only (2022 Nik Kershaw Solitary Remix" (Spotify/Apple Music/Amazon Music Exclusive Bonus Track) | Kershaw | 4:33 |

Disc 2: Get the Picture (1993)
| No. | Title | Writer(s) | Length |
|---|---|---|---|
| 1. | "Tell Me Something I Don't Know" | Hawkes; Kershaw | 3:33 |
| 2. | "What's Wrong with This Picture?" | Hawkes; Kershaw; Peter-John Vettese | 4:26 |
| 3. | "Help Me to Help Myself" | Hawkes; Kershaw | 4:03 |
| 4. | "Sometimes" | Hawkes; Randy Goodrum | 4:30 |
| 5. | "Black or White People" | Albert Hammond; Hawkes | 3:54 |
| 6. | "Missing You Already" | Hawkes; Kershaw; Vettese | 4:05 |
| 7. | "One of Those Days" | Hawkes; Richard Feldman | 3:08 |
| 8. | "Fairweather Christian" | Hawkes; Goodrum | 4:30 |
| 9. | "The Family Way" | Hawkes; Kershaw | 4:17 |
| 10. | "Every Little Tear" | Hawkes; Paul Janz | 4:00 |
| 11. | "Friends and Lovers (Demo)" (Bonus Track) | Hawkes | 3:58 |
| 12. | "It Hurts When I Laugh" (Bonus Track) | Kershaw | 4:24 |
| 13. | "What's Wrong With This Picture? (Dakeyne's Interference Mix)" (Bonus Track) | Hawkes; Kershaw; Vettese | 4:26 |
| 14. | "What's Wrong With This Picture? (12" Dance Mix)" (Bonus Track) | Hawkes; Kershaw; Vettese | 6:46 |

Disc 3: Another Fine Mess (2007)
| No. | Title | Writer(s) | Length |
|---|---|---|---|
| 1. | "Overrated" | Hawkes; Daniel Pandher | 3:33 |
| 2. | "Next Life" | Hawkes; Phil Thornalley | 2:49 |
| 3. | "Stay Away Baby Jane" | Hawkes; Adam Schlesinger | 4:17 |
| 4. | "Sand" | Hawkes; Jesse Valenzuela | 4:50 |
| 5. | "Don't Just Stand There" | Hawkes; Charlton Pettus | 4:42 |
| 6. | "Another Fine Mess" | Hawkes; Kershaw | 3:30 |
| 7. | "Failing Light" | Hawkes; Pettus | 4:30 |
| 8. | "Blissfully Unaware" | Hawkes; Pettus | 3:03 |
| 9. | "Her" | Hawkes; Goodrum | 3:22 |
| 10. | "Oh So Dull" | Hawkes; Pettus | 4:49 |
| 11. | "English Dream" | Hawkes; Paul Luther | 3:36 |
| 12. | "Seven of Sundays" | Hawkes; Pettus | 4:45 |
| 13. | "Come and Get It" | Paul McCartney | 3:28 |
| 14. | "Please Bring Me Down" | Delaine Douglas; Nick Hammond; Hawkes; Luther | 3:41 |
| 15. | "Almost You" | Matt Bronleewe; Hawkes | 4:19 |
| 16. | "Staring at the Sun" | Hawkes; Joanne Youle | 4:37 |
| 17. | "Stay Away Baby Jane (Axton Speedway Remix)" (Bonus Track) | Hawkes; Schlesinger | 5:00 |
| 18. | "Sand (Janice Long BBC Acoustic Session)" (Bonus Track) | Hawkes; Valenzuela | 4:01 |
| 19. | "Oh So Dull (Janice Long BBC Acoustic Session)" (Bonus Track) | Hawkes; Pettus | 4:03 |
| 20. | "Next Life (Janice Long BBC Acoustic Session)" (Bonus Track) | Hawkes; Thornalley | 2:32 |

Disc 4: Real Life Love (2012)
| No. | Title | Writer(s) | Length |
|---|---|---|---|
| 1. | "Comeback" | C. Hawkes; Keely Hawkes; Fredrik Thomander | 4:05 |
| 2. | "Flashback Heroine" | C. Hawkes; Jon-Willy Rydningen | 3:07 |
| 3. | "Real Life Love" | C. Hawkes; Rydningen; Børge Petersen-Øverleir | 3:37 |
| 4. | "Caught Up in Circles" | Hammond; C. Hawkes; Gummi Jonss | 3:17 |
| 5. | "Always Have, Always Will" | Hawkes; Dean Pitchford | 3:44 |
| 6. | "John Lennon Lived Here" | C. Hawkes; Kershaw | 3:28 |
| 7. | "Aeroplane" | Chris Garcia; C. Hawkes; K. Hawkes | 3:22 |
| 8. | "Camouflage" | C. Hawkes; K. Hawkes; Toby Pitman | 3:49 |
| 9. | "Let That Be Enough" | C. Hawkes; K. Hawkes; Rydningen | 3:40 |
| 10. | "The One and Only (Acoustic Version)" (Bonus Track) | Kershaw | 3:13 |
| 11. | "Let That Be Enough (Original Demo)" (Bonus Track) | C. Hawkes; K. Hawkes; Rydningen | 3:33 |
| 12. | "John Lennon Lived Here (Original '92 Demo)" (Bonus Track) | C. Hawkes; Kershaw | 3:38 |
| 13. | "Always Have, Always Will (Original Demo)" (Bonus Track) | C. Hawkes; Pitchford | 3:20 |
| 14. | "Till You Know What You Want (Demo)" (Bonus Track) | C. Hawkes; Robert Ellis Orrall | 3:54 |
| 15. | "Gravity's Gone (Demo)" (Bonus Track) | C. Hawkes; Pettus | 3:09 |
| 16. | "I Wanna Be Somebody (Demo)" (Bonus Track) | C. Hawkes; Kershaw | 4:03 |
| 17. | "Love Lies Bleeding (Demo)" (Bonus Track) | C. Hawkes; Kershaw | 4:08 |
| 18. | "Little Miss Understood (Demo)" (Bonus Track) | Mike d'Abo |
| 19. | "Watching Over You (Demo)" (Bonus Track) | C. Hawkes; Kershaw | 4:13 |
| 20. | "Please Bring Me Down (Demo)" (Bonus Track) | Douglas; Hammond; C. Hawkes; Luther | 3:33 |

Disc 5: Rarities
| No. | Title | Writer(s) | Length |
|---|---|---|---|
| 1. | "Brain Train" (Film Master Mix) | Hinton; Harding | 3:13 |
| 2. | "Secrets of the Heart" (Film Master Mix) | Hinton; Hawkes | 3:47 |
| 3. | "Feel So Alive" (Film Master Mix) | Hinton; Harding | 4:19 |
| 4. | "Taking the Blame" (Film Master Mix) | Hinton; Harding | 1:53 |
| 5. | "Nothing Serious" (Film Master Mix) | Hinton; Harding |
| 6. | "I'm Young" (Film Master Mix) | Hinton; Harding | 2:17 |
| 7. | "This Is Me" (Film Master Mix) | Hinton; Harding | 3:39 |
| 8. | "Ordinary Girl" (Film Master Mix) | Hinton; Harding |
| 9. | "Torn in Half" | Hinton; Hawkes | 3:55 |
| 10. | "The One and Only" (Abbey Road Monitor Mix) | Kershaw | 3:34 |
| 11. | "Move On" (Live at Abbey Road) | Hawkes; Ashley Alexander | 3:50 |
| 12. | "Friday Night at Hollywood" (Demo) | Hawkes | 3:58 |
| 13. | "She's the One" | Karl Wallinger | 4:18 |
| 14. | "The One and Only" (2005 Dance Mix) | Kershaw | 3:58 |
| 15. | "I'm a Man Not a Boy" (Original Demo) | Hinton; Harding; Hawkes | 2:57 |
| 16. | "Nothing Serious" (Original Demo) | Hinton; Harding | 3:18 |
| 17. | "I'm Young" (Alternate Song) | Hinton; Harding | 2:57 |
| 18. | "Peggy Sue" (Buddy's Song Demo) | Jerry Allison; Norman Petty | 2:00 |
| 19. | "Tell Me Something I Don't Know" (JM Kitchen Sink Mix) | Hawkes; Kershaw | 4:25 |
| 20. | "Sometimes" (JM Kitchen Sink Mix) | Hawkes; Goodrum | 4:45 |
| 21. | "Fairweather Christian" (Original Demo) | Hawkes; Goodrum | 4:20 |

DVD: The Videos 1991–2012
| No. | Title | Length |
|---|---|---|
| 1. | "The One and Only (Film Version)" (Music Video) |
| 2. | "I'm a Man Not a Boy" (Music Video) |
| 3. | "Secrets of the Heart" (Music Video) |
| 4. | "Feel So Alive" (Music Video) |
| 5. | "What's Wrong With This Picture?" (Music Video) |
| 6. | "Missing You Already" (Music Video) |
| 7. | "Stay Away Baby Jane" (Music Video) |
| 8. | "Caught Up in Circles" (Music Video) |
| 9. | "Aeroplane" (Music Video) |
| 10. | "Another Fine Mess" (Music Video) |
| 11. | "The One and Only (International Version)" (Music Video) |
| 12. | "The One and Only (U.S. Version)" (Music Video) |
| 13. | "I'm a Man Not a Boy (Alternate Version)" (Music Video) |
| 14. | "The One and Only" (Top of the Pops Performance, 14 March 1991) |
| 15. | "The One and Only" (Top of the Pops Performance, 28 March 1991) |
| 16. | "The One and Only" (Top of the Pops Performance, 25 December 1991) |
| 17. | "I'm Young" (Live in Mannheim, Germany 1991) |
| 18. | "The One and Only" (Live in Mannheim, Germany 1991) |
| 19. | "Secrets of the Heart" (Live in Mannheim, Germany 1991) |
| 20. | "I'm a Man Not a Boy" (Live in Mannheim, Germany 1991) |
