= Beaver Towers =

Children's fantasy novel by Nigel Hinton

- Cover of the first edition
- Author: Nigel Hinton
- Language: English
- Genre: Children's fiction, fantasy
- Publisher: Abelard-Schuman (original USA), Knight, Galaxy, Puffin Books (current)
- Publication date: 4 September 1980
- Media type: Hardback, paperback, e-book
- ISBN: 978-0200727259
- Followed by: Beaver Towers: the Witch's Revenge

Beaver Towers is a children's fantasy novel by British author Nigel Hinton which was first published in 1980. It was his first novel written for children and is the first installment in the Beaver Towers series. It follows the story of Philip, a schoolboy dragged off by his kite to an island ruled by intelligent talking animals under threat from a wicked witch and her servants.

== Concept ==
The author wanted to write a story sending a young boy to an island with the kind of dangers, magic and excitement not expected to be found in reality, and someone mentioned kites.

== The series ==
The books in the series are:

1. Beaver Towers (1980)
2. The Witch's Revenge (1981)
3. The Dangerous Journey (1986); also published as Run to Beaver Towers
4. The Dark Dream (1997)
