= Collision Course =

Collision Course may refer to:

== Books ==
- Collision Course (Hinton novel), a novel by Nigel Hinton
- Collision Course (Silverberg novel), a 1958 novel by Robert Silverberg
- Collision Course (Bayley novel), a novel by Barrington J. Bayley
- Academy: Collision Course, a novel by William Shatner and Judith and Garfield Reeves-Stevens, see the List of Star Trek novels

== Film ==
- Collision Course (1989 film), an action comedy film starring actors Jay Leno and Pat Morita
- Collision Course (2021 film), a Nigerian drama film directed by Bolanle Austen-Peters.
- Collision Course (2026 film), a Spanish thriller film directed by Daniel Sánchez Arévalo.
- The Crocodile Hunter: Collision Course, a 2002 Australian comedy-adventure film starring Steve Irwin
- Ice Age: Collision Course, a 2016 animated science fiction comedy film

== Music ==
- Collision Course (EP), a 2004 album by Jay-Z and Linkin Park
- Collision Course (Asleep at the Wheel album), 1978
- Collision Course (Paradox album), a 2000 album by Paradox

== Television ==
- "Collision Course" (Arrow), an episode of Arrow
- "Collision Course" (The Punisher), an episode of The Punisher
- "Collision Course" (Space: 1999), an episode from the first series of Space: 1999
- "Collision Course (Part I)"
- "Collision Course (Part II)"

== See also ==
- Collision (disambiguation)
