= Walk the Wild Road =

2009 novel by Nigel Hinton

- Cover of the edition published by Sourcebooks in 2011, which was the first to use the current title
- Author: Nigel Hinton
- Original title: The Road from Home
- Language: English
- Genre: Teenage fiction
- Publisher: Sourcebooks (original), CB Creative
- Media type: Hardback, paperback, e-book

Walk the Wild Road, earlier titled The Road from Home, is a novel by Nigel Hinton. It is set in 1870 and tells the story of a boy forced to leave his home in Prussian Poland for a new life in America. It was first published in October 2009 as the Road from Home. The current title was used from February 2011 to avoid confusion with a similarly titled novel.

== Concept ==
The novel is based on a legend in the author's family that in 1870 his grandfather left his home in Poland at the age of eleven. Hinton visited Poland in 2005, shortly after the death of Pope John Paul II. He found his ancestral home in Polichno, then followed the river Vistula to the sea from Bydgoszcz and Toruń, collecting inspirations along the way.

== Reception ==
Kirkus Reviews wrote, "The two main characters are reasonably well-developed, and the obstacles they face are never minimized in this coming-of-age tale. But sentence structure rarely varies, colorful imagery [...] is lacking, and the plot-driven narrative moves forward at a measured, too-predictable pace. These factors all conspire to keep this from rising above a crowded field." Historical Novel Society called the novel "a classic hero’s tale—a linear, solid, and yet compelling story told completely from [the main protagonist's], Leo's, point of view."
