= Secrets of the Heart (song) =

1991 single by Chesney Hawkes

Single by Chesney Hawkes

from the album Buddy's Song
- B-side: "One World"
- Released: 16 September 1991
- Length: 3:57
- Label: Chrysalis
- Songwriter: Nik Kershaw
- Producer: Alan Shacklock

Chesney Hawkes singles chronology
"I'm a Man Not a Boy" (1991)	"Secrets of the Heart" (1991)	"What's Wrong With This Picture?" (1991)

Music video
- "Secrets of the Heart" on YouTube

"Secrets of the Heart" is the third single by British singer and actor Chesney Hawkes. Written by Chesney Hawkes and Nigel Hinton, it was included in the film Buddy's Song, with Hawkes as Buddy and Roger Daltrey (of rock band the Who) as his father. The B-side is a cover of "One World", written and originally recorded by Nik Kershaw from his 1989 album The Works. Released on 16 September 1991, "Secrets of the Heart" peaked at No. 57 on the UK Singles Chart.

== Track listing ==
UK CD single
No.	Title	Writer(s)	Length
1.	"Secrets of the Heart"	Nigel Hinton; Chesney Hawkes	3:57
2.	"One World"	Nik Kershaw	4:19
3.	"Secrets of the Heart" (Live)	Hinton; Hawkes	3:10
Total length:			11:26

== Charts ==
Chart (1991)	Peak position
UK Singles (OCC)	57
UK Airplay (Music Week)	27
