= Beaver Towers: The Witch's Revenge =

Children's fantasy novel by Nigel Hinton

- Cover of the first edition. The "Beaver Towers" prefix was used from July 1995 by Puffin Books.
- Author: Nigel Hinton
- Language: English
- Genre: Children's fiction, fantasy
- Publisher: Abelard-Schuman (original USA), Knight, Galaxy, Puffin Books (current)
- Publication date: October 1981
- Media type: Print (hardback, paperback), e-book
- ISBN: 978-0200727655
- Preceded by: Beaver Towers
- Followed by: Beaver Towers: the Dangerous Journey

Beaver Towers: The Witch's Revenge is a children's fantasy novel by British author Nigel Hinton which was first published in 1981. It is the second installment in the Beaver Towers series, coming between Beaver Towers and Beaver Towers: The Dangerous Journey. It follows the story of Philip who was summoned to Beaver Towers when Oyin the Witch went after him. In 1994 an audiobook was released by Chivers Children's Audio Books.

== Concept ==
The author decided to write a sequel to Beaver Towers after receiving letters about it and decided to have Philip in danger from Oyin back in his normal everyday life.
