= The One and Only (song) =

1991 single by Chesney Hawkes

Single by Chesney Hawkes

from the album Buddy's Song
- B-side: "It's Gonna Be Tough"; "Say Mama"
- Released: 28 January 1991
- Genre: Power pop
- Length: 3:42
- Label: Chrysalis
- Songwriter: Nik Kershaw
- Producers: Alan Shacklock; Nik Kershaw

Chesney Hawkes singles chronology
"The One and Only" (1991)	"I'm a Man Not a Boy" (1991)

Music video
- "The One and Only" on YouTube

"The One and Only" is a song by the English singer and actor Chesney Hawkes. Written by Nik Kershaw, the single was released by Chrysalis Records in January 1991 as Hawkes' debut single. Produced by Kershaw and Alan Shacklock, the song was included in the comedy-drama film Buddy's Song (1991), which starred Hawkes as the eponymous Buddy and Roger Daltrey as his father.

"The One and Only" was a hit in the United Kingdom, topping the UK singles chart for five weeks in March and April 1991. It also reached number one in Austria and entered the top 10 in 10 other European countries. In the United States, the song was included in the romantic comedy film Doc Hollywood (1991). The single proved to be Hawkes' only hit in the US, peaking at No. 10 on the Billboard Hot 100 chart in November 1991.

== Critical reception ==
Larry Flick from Billboard magazine commented, "Sugar-coated pop rocker by U.K. male vocalist, who was discovered by Roger Daltrey, is beginning to duplicate previous European chart success. Anthemic lyrics and a heartfelt performance should help push this over the top with top 40 punters." Pan-European magazine Music & Media wrote, "Written by Nick Kershaw in his own, unmistakeable style. Pretty soon this young man will be a familiar face, competing directly with the likes of Rick Astley."

== Music videos ==
Three music videos for the single were produced. The first video is a direct tie-in to Buddy's Song. A girl (played by Saffron) and her friend (played by Lucy Alexander) go to a cinema to watch the film, where Buddy Clark (Hawkes) jumps out of the screen and beckons the girl to follow him. They go into a storage room, but Buddy is then pulled back into the screen; he escapes again, only to have his father Terry (Roger Daltrey) come out of the screen and chase after them. Finally, at the end of the video, Buddy reaches out of the screen to the girl, who takes his hands and goes into the screen with him. They kiss whilst being watched by the girl's shocked friend.

The second video is an in person concert performance of the song intercut with black-and-white footage of Hawkes' interaction with his fans. This version was released in international markets where Buddy's Song was not released. The third video is an alternate edit of the second version featuring scenes from Doc Hollywood. All three videos are included in the DVD of the career-spanning box set The Complete Picture: The Albums 1991–2012 (2022).

== Track listings ==
UK CD single
No.	Title	Writer(s)	Length
1.	"The One and Only"	Nik Kershaw	3:42
2.	"It's Gonna Be Tough" (film version)	Nigel Hinton; John Wesley Harding	2:29
3.	"Say Mama"	Johnny Meeks; Johnny Earl	2:09
4.	"It's Gonna Be Tough"	Hinton; Harding	2:50
Total length:			11:10

US cassette single
No.	Title	Writer(s)	Length
1.	"The One and Only"	Kershaw	3:42
2.	"The One and Only" (US remix)	Kershaw	3:42
3.	"It's Gonna Be Tough"	Hinton; Harding	2:27

== Charts ==
=== Weekly charts ===
Chart (1991)	Peak position
Austria (Ö3 Austria Top 40)	1
Belgium (Ultratop 50 Flanders)	3
Canada Top Singles (RPM)	61
Canada Adult Contemporary (RPM)	37
Denmark (IFPI)	6
Europe (Eurochart Hot 100)	5
Europe (European Hit Radio)	3
Finland (Suomen virallinen lista)	2
Germany (GfK)	8
Ireland (IRMA)	3
Luxembourg (Radio Luxembourg)	2
Netherlands (Dutch Top 40)	11
Netherlands (Single Top 100)	9
Norway (VG-lista)	5
Sweden (Sverigetopplistan)	2
Switzerland (Schweizer Hitparade)	4
UK Singles (Official Charts)	1
UK Airplay (Music Week)	1
US Billboard Hot 100	10
US Cash Box Top 100	11

Chart (2016)	Peak position
Poland Airplay (ZPAV)	75

=== Year-end charts ===
Chart (1991)	Position
Austria (Ö3 Austria Top 40)	20
Belgium (Ultratop)	29
Europe (Eurochart Hot 100)	19
Europe (European Hit Radio)	8
Germany (Media Control)	34
Sweden (Topplistan)	9
UK Singles (OCC)	7
US Billboard Hot 100	93

== Certifications ==
Region	Certification	Certified units/sales
Sweden (GLF)	Gold	25,000^{^}
United Kingdom (BPI)	Silver	200,000^{‡}
^{^} Shipments figures based on certification alone.^{‡} Sales+streaming figures based on certification alone.

== Release history ==
Region	Date	Format(s)	Label(s)	Ref(s).
United Kingdom	28 January 1991	7-inch vinyl; 12-inch vinyl; CD; cassette	Chrysalis	
Australia	6 May 1991	7-inch vinyl; cassette	Chrysalis	
Australia	27 May 1991	CD	Chrysalis	
Japan	26 July 1991	Mini-CD	Chrysalis	
Australia	16 September 1991	7-inch vinyl	Chrysalis	

== 2022 Nik Kershaw remix ==
"The One and Only" (2022 Nik Kershaw remix)

Single by Chesney Hawkes
- Released: 4 March 2022
- Genre: Pop rock
- Length: 4:25
- Label: Chrysalis
- Songwriter: Nik Kershaw
- Producers: Nik Kershaw; Alan Shacklock

Music video
- "The One and Only (Nik Kershaw 2022 Remix)" on YouTube

"The One and Only" was remixed by writer Nik Kershaw, performed by Hawkes and released by Chrysalis Records solely on downloads on 4 March 2022 as a non-album single. It is also included as a bonus track on the Spotify, Apple Music, and Amazon Music releases of the compilation The Complete Picture: The Albums 1991–2012.

=== Track listing ===
No.	Title	Writer(s)	Length
1.	"The One and Only" (2022 Nik Kershaw remix)	Nik Kershaw	4:25

== Use in other media ==
- Director Duncan Jones featured the song in some of his films. In Moon (2009) it is used as the wake-up alarm for the main character. In the film Source Code (2011), the song appears as the cellphone ringtone of the character of Christina. It is heard as background music for a game being played in Jones' film Mute (2018). A deleted scene in Warcraft (2016) would have featured Hawkes himself as a bard playing it on a lute. It is used in a teaser trailer for Jones' film Rogue Trooper.
- In 2014, Hawkes performed the song with a flashmob dance group in the streets of Manchester to promote MyMate Loans. In addition, he recorded a version of the song with different lyrics for a MyMate commercial.
- Hawkes sang the song at halftime at the 2022 FIFA World Cup group stage match between Wales and England.

== See also ==
- List of European number-one airplay songs of the 1990s
