= The Heart of the Valley =

1986 novel by Nigel Hinton

- Cover of the first edition
- Author: Nigel Hinton
- Language: English
- Genre: Adult fiction, nature writing
- Publisher: HarperCollins (original), Constable, Academy Chicago Publishers, Pan Books, CB Creative Books (current publisher)
- Publication date: 1986
- Publication place: United Kingdom
- Media type: Hardback, paperback, e-book
- ISBN: 0060156554

The Heart of the Valley is a novel by British author Nigel Hinton. It was first published in 1986 and was his first and to date only book written for adults. The story focuses on the nature of an English valley especially the dunnocks.

== Plot ==
In the winter a female dunnock left her territory to find food and came to the front garden of Brook Cottage where other birds were also feeding from the bird table. That evening Eve Conrad of the cottage received a phone call telling her that her son Daniel was in hospital from an accident so she left to be with him. The next morning the dunnock was among the birds who arrived at Brook Cottage but there was no new food with the house vacant. While searching for food at nearby Forge Farm she heard the voice of her own kind and met a male dunnock. After flying around together the male showed the female a storeroom on the farm with food. When the spring came the dunnocks built a nest on a ledge in the building but after a rat searched and wrecked it they searched for another site. The next day they settled in the hedge opposite Brook Cottage. The dunnocks mated and laid four eggs but the nest along with three eggs were destroyed by a lorry passing a parked car whilst taking a shortcut down the lane. The fourth egg was eaten by a hedgehog that evening.

The dunnocks moved to a bullace bush by Forge Farm where they nested and laid four more eggs. Meanwhile, a cuckoo who was raised in the valley had migrated from Africa and substituted the dunnocks' fourth egg for her own feeling the need to lay. The cuckoo egg hatched three and a half days after the first of the dunnocks' eggs and that evening whilst the parents searched for food the newborn evicted the dunnock weakling who broke her neck when she landed on the ground and was eaten by a fox. The following day the cuckoo had evicted the other female dunnock nestling who survived the fall out of the bush but was taken by a jay. On the cuckoo's seventh day the dunnock father was hit by a car whilst searching for food in the early morning light and was eaten by a crow when he died. The remaining dunnock nestling spent much of his time and energy dodging attacks from the cuckoo and the feeding became less frequent with the mother being the sole provider. When the dunnock nestling was two days away from full growth the cuckoo tried to evict him but he survived by perching on the branches of the bush. He did the same the following day and on the next day he practiced flying. After learning to hunt for himself the young male dunnock flew away wanting to be independent.

When the summer was over the mother cuckoo migrated back to Africa but would die en route the following year. Her offspring also migrated though five of them also died but the one raised by the dunnocks survived. The mother dunnock died the following winter during a cold spell and was eaten by a fox. The surviving male dunnock mated the following year and had six offspring. The story ends with the writer taking a walk in the valley.

== Concept ==
The author once narrowly missed hitting a bird whilst driving to a railway station. On the train journey he imagined what might have happened if he hit the bird and it became the starting point for writing the novel. It was also based on the nature in the valley where he lived.
