= The Finders (novel) =

1993 novel by Nigel Hinton

- Cover of the first edition
- Author: Nigel Hinton
- Illustrator: Derek Brazell
- Language: English
- Genre: Children's fiction, fantasy
- Publisher: Viking Press (original), Puffin Books, Barn Owl Books, CB Creative
- Publication date: 25 March 1993
- Media type: hardback, paperback
- ISBN: 978-0670846412

The Finders is a 1993 novel by British author Nigel Hinton. It is the only one of his children's books not related to the Beaver Towers series. In it, schoolgirl Rosie is asked to post a package and becomes possessed by its contents. She, with the help of two invisible beings, has to return the package to an evil djinn before it is too late.

== Inspiration ==
Hinton got the idea for the book after he discovered that two ladies he liked were saying things behind his back.

== Plot ==
On her way to school Rosie Brooks was asked by an elderly frail man to post a parcel for him the following day so it would arrive on his brother's birthday. Rosie took the parcel and went to school. Things started going wrong for her and she spotted a cat and a crow staring at her from outside. Back home Rosie was behaving badly there as well. After giving her baby brother Jimmy a ride in his push-chair out in the garden she saw the same cat and crow again. She told her mother but she was sure it was a coincidence. That night she touched the parcel and lightning struck outside with the cat and crow on the lawn.

The following day Rosie's family went to visit her grandmother while she walked to her friend Rebecca's house. After she posted the parcel a sack was pulled over her head and her captors walked her into a garage. She could not see them but she could hear and feel them. The captors, who called themselves the Finders introduced themselves as Mr Ikbal and his apprentice Sidri and told her they were after a Djinn which they believed was her until Rosie explained what had happened. Mr Ikbal told Rosie that the package contained the Djinn Star and because she had it in her possession for more than a day she had started to turn into a Djinn. Rosie did not believe it at first but accepted it when she started to fly as Djinn did and was told that she had to thing of something honest and kind to keep her bad side at bay. Ikbal explained that they would have to return the package to the Djinn so they could arrest him at Witching hour which was at midnight. Rosie agreed to help them and set off for the post box. By the time they got there the postman had just collected the mail and left but not before Rosie saw the number on the van.

Rosie and the Finders set off for the sorting office in the town centre. On the way Rosie learned that the Finders were angels, it was their job to bring Djinn back to the "other side", they were only invisible to humans and it was Sidri's first mission. As they waited for their postman Rosie telephoned Rebecca to say that she would not be able to come. When the postman arrived Rosie tried to get the parcel back but the postman said it would have to be delivered. Rosie went inside the building and found the parcel which gave her the sensation of the Djinn Star the she was spotted by the same postman. After he grabbed her the Finders moved two sacks and a trolley scaring the postal workers into thinking there were ghosts about and it made them flee. The Finders then tickled the postman with Rosie who let her go and she ran through a department store to escape. Outside she was cornered by the postal workers and thought bad thoughts to make her fly away from them. High up above town Rosie made it rain then she thought about making lightning but she realized it could hit her family and she started having good thoughts and came back down to the ground near her street.

Rosie found her way home and after sleeping there was a knock on the door. She saw what looked like two terrifying monsters through the letter box. She then heard the Finders voices call and she let them in but they still frightened her. After some coaxing Rosie realized that the monsters were in fact the Finders. Mr Ikbal explained that she had become more Djinn like and could see them as something frightening because Djinn hate angels. Ikbal suggested they should eat to keep their strength up and after their meal Rosie disguised herself as a man and set off on her bike for the address on the parcel as Ikbal suggested. Rosie cycled to Boglin with the Finders flying behind. On the way the Moon appeared to sing and summon her. The Finders stopped her from flying then told her that Djinn were attracted to the Moon and told her not to look at it. When they reached Boglin Rosie knocked on a door and asked the elderly man for directions to Gallows Tree Cottage. He told her it was occupied by Miss Kittie and Miss Rooke who baked cakes and were friendly with the villagers. On the way Ikbal pointed out that Kittie is a pet name for a cat and a rook is a kind of crow which were the two animals found near a Djinn. When they reached the cottage Ikbal could feel the presence of the Djinn but told Rosie that she would have to go in alone as the Finders could not arrest the Djinn until midnight.

In the cottage Rosie was greeted by Miss Kittie and Miss Rooke who offered her cake and a drink then Mr Robin Goodfellow, to whom the parcel was addressed, came in. Rosie went into the study to see him. Goodfellow who was actually the Djinn saw through Rosie's disguise when she tried to hand him the parcel and he revealed his walking stick to be a sorcerer's sword which only Djinn and Rosie could see. He tried to get Rosie to bow her head and swear obedience to him. When she refused he said he had time and read while he waited. The Djinn appeared to read Rosie's mind and tried to encourage her when she thought about what it would be like to be a Djinn. When the Djinn tried to temp Rosie again Sidri broke in through the window and convinced her to stay on the good side. Rosie slipped the parcel into the Djinn's hand and while Sidri distracted him she escaped to her bike and the stuffed animals in his study came to life and chased after her. Rosie cycled as fast as she could whilst the animals led by the wolf pursued her. During the escape Rosie fell off the bike so she went into the wood trying to hide but the animals still found her. Rosie climbed a tree and the animals circled the bottom. The Djinn got the ivy on the tree to bind Rosie then he tried to force her to take back the Djinn Star. Rosie resisted him even when the ivy chocked and tortured her.

On the stroke of midnight the ivy unwound itself from her, the stuffed animals froze and Rosie fell from the tree. The Finders arrived and Mr Ikbal congratulated Rosie for resisting the temptation and Sidri for doing well on his first mission. Ikbal arrested the Djinn in the names of Sidri, Rosie and the ninety-nine names of goodness sending him back to where he belonged. Rosie asked where the "other side" was and Ikbal said it was everywhere except here. The Finders glowed bright and Rosie thought they were beautiful. As they disappeared the Finders told Rosie they had to go but they would always be her friend.

Rosie went home and waited for her family to arrive. A few days later there was a storm and Rosie's younger school age brother Mark wanted her to tell him a story. She told him about the Finders and he said he knew they were real because he could see them shining in her eyes.

== Award ==
In 1994 the novel won the Federation of Children's Book Groups Award.
