= Buddy (TV series) =

1986 TV series

- Based on: Buddy by Nigel Hinton
- Country of origin: United Kingdom
- Original language: English
- No. of series: 1
- No. of episodes: 5

Original release
- Network: BBC2
- Release: 6 January – 3 February 1986

The TV Script of Buddy
- The cover of the script which was published as a book.
- Language: English
- Publisher: Hinemann
- Publication date: May 1987
- Publication place: United Kingdom
- Media type: Print (paperback)
- ISBN: 978-0-435-23412-6

Buddy is a BBC schools drama, based on the novel of the same name by Nigel Hinton. It was shown as part of the social studies strand.

It starred Wayne Goddard as Buddy Clark, a teenager dealing with various life problems, Roger Daltrey as his father Terry and pupils from the Cavendish School in Eastbourne.

Daltrey reprised his role in the 1991 film Buddy's Song with Chesney Hawkes as Buddy.

== Episodes ==
1. "Raining in My Heart"
2. "Crying, Waiting, Hoping"
3. "Blue Suede Shoes"
4. "That'll Be the Day"
5. "Everyday It's-A Getting Closer"

== Cast ==
Actor	Role
Wayne Goddard	Buddy Clark
Caspar Hayley	Young Buddy
Roger Daltrey	Terry Clark
Kay Stonham	Carol Clark
Norman Bird	Mr Normington
Lorraine Plummer	Charmian Rybeero
Dennis Victory	Julius Rybeero
Ena Cabayo	Mrs Rybeero
Lloyd Anderson	Mr Rybeero
John Harrington	David Siddell
Debra Saunders	Emma Groves
Anne Dyson	Mrs Soloman
Duncan Preston	Ralph Campbell
Trevor Ray	Mr King
Virginia Denham	Joyce
