= Partners in Crime (Hinton novel) =

2003 novel by Nigel Hinton

- Cover of the first edition
- Author: Nigel Hinton
- Language: English
- Genre: Teenage fiction
- Publisher: Barrington Stoke
- Publication date: 31 January 2003
- Publication place: United Kingdom
- Media type: Paperback
- ISBN: 978-1842991022

Partners in Crime is a novel by British author Nigel Hinton which was first published in 2003. It follows the story of three old school friends who make money from drug dealing and love the same girl, which causes a rift between them.

== Concept ==
The novel is based on a very old folk song about betrayal and murder. The author then thought of the idea of three boys who meet in primary school and lead a tough life.

== Award ==
In 2014 the novel won the Coventry Inspiration Book Award in the category "Fancy a Quickie" for adults.
