= I'm a Man Not a Boy =

1991 single by Chesney Hawkes

Single by Chesney Hawkes

from the album Buddy's Song
- B-side: "Torn in Half"; "Ordinary Girl"
- Released: 10 June 1991
- Length: 4:02
- Label: Chrysalis
- Songwriters: Nigel Hinton; John Wesley Harding; Chesney Hawkes
- Producer: Alan Shacklock

Chesney Hawkes singles chronology
"The One and Only" (1991)	"I'm a Man Not a Boy" (1991)	"Secrets of the Heart" (1991)

Music video
- "I'm a Man Not a Boy" on YouTube

"I'm a Man Not a Boy" is the second single by the English singer and actor Chesney Hawkes. Written by Hawkes, Nigel Hinton and John Wesley Harding, and produced by Alan Shacklock, it was released in June 1991 by Chrysalis Records and included in the 1991 film Buddy's Song, with Hawkes as Buddy and Roger Daltrey (of rock band the Who) as his father. The single entered the UK singles chart at No. 37 and climbed to a peak position of No. 27 a week later, making it the second of two of Hawkes' singles to enter the top 40.

== Track listings ==
7-inch and cassette single
No.	Title	Writer(s)	Length
1.	"I'm a Man Not a Boy"	Nigel Hinton; John Wesley Harding; Chesney Hawkes
2.	"Torn in Half" (orchestral mix)	Hinton; Hawkes

12-inch single
No.	Title	Writer(s)	Length
1.	"I'm a Man Not a Boy"	Hinton; Harding; Hawkes
2.	"Ordinary Girl"	Hinton; Hawkes
3.	"I'm a Man Not a Boy" (film version)	Hinton; Harding; Hawkes
4.	"Torn in Half" (orchestral mix)	Hinton; Harding

CD single
No.	Title	Writer(s)	Length
1.	"I'm a Man Not a Boy"	Hinton; Harding; Hawkes
2.	"Torn in Half" (orchestral mix)	Hinton; Hawkes
3.	"I'm a Man Not a Boy" (film version)	Hinton; Harding; Hawkes
4.	"Ordinary Girl"	Hinton; Harding

== Charts ==
=== Weekly charts ===
Chart (1991)	Peak position
Belgium (Ultratop 50 Flanders)	20
Europe (Eurochart Hot 100)	60
Europe (European Hit Radio)	9
Germany (GfK)	44
Luxembourg (Radio Luxembourg)	13
Sweden (Sverigetopplistan)	32
Switzerland (Schweizer Hitparade)	28
UK Singles (OCC)	27
UK Airplay (Music Week)	6

=== Year-end charts ===
Chart (1991)	Position
Europe (European Hit Radio)	92
