= Buddy's Song (album) =

- Original British cover which was a tie-in with the film.

Studio album by Chesney Hawkes
- Released: 1991
- Studio: Abbey Road Studios
- Genre: Pop rock
- Length: 43:38 (UK); 45:01 (U.S.)
- Label: Chrysalis
- Producer: Alan Shacklock; Len Hawkes

Chesney Hawkes chronology
| Buddy's Song (1991) | Get the Picture (1993) |

Singles from Buddy's Song
- 1. "The One and Only" Released: 28 January 1991; 2. "I'm a Man Not a Boy" Released: 10 June 1991; 3. "Secrets of the Heart" Released: 16 September 1991

Alternative Cover
- American cover with the title The One and Only. This cover is used on the download release in the UK, replacing the title with Buddy's Song.

Buddy's Song is the debut studio album by English singer and actor Chesney Hawkes, released in 1991 by Chrysalis Records. It serves as the soundtrack to the film of the same name and includes the UK number one single "The One and Only". The film's screenwriter Nigel Hinton contributed to the soundtrack by co-writing all but three songs in the UK release of the album. The album and film soundtrack were recorded and mixed entirely at Abbey Road Studios by engineer Gareth Cousins.

The album was released in the United States as The One and Only, as the film was not widely released in the country. For this version, the songs "This Is Me" and "A Crazy World Like This" were replaced with "Waiting for the Night" and a cover of Nik Kershaw's "One World". The title track was featured in the film Doc Hollywood.

Every song on the British release of the album was used in the film except "A Crazy World Like This". Buddy's Song was Hawkes' only album to make the Top 40, peaking at number 18 in the UK Albums Chart. Aside from "The One and Only", "I'm a Man Not a Boy" and "Secrets of the Heart" were also released as singles. In the U.S., "Feel So Alive" was released as the second single, but it failed to chart.

Buddy's Song was included in the 2022 box set The Complete Picture: The Albums 1991–2012, with five bonus tracks and the previously unreleased master mixes for the film.

== Track listing ==
All tracks are written by Nigel Hinton and John Wesley Harding, except where indicated.

UK release
| No. | Title | Writer(s) | Length |
|---|---|---|---|
| 1. | "The One and Only" | Nik Kershaw | 3:44 |
| 2. | "Nothing Serious" | | 3:34 |
| 3. | "Feel So Alive" | | 4:48 |
| 4. | "I'm a Man Not a Boy" | Hinton; Harding; Chesney Hawkes | 4:00 |
| 5. | "It's Gonna Be Tough" | | 2:30 |
| 6. | "Torn in Half" | Hinton; Hawkes | 4:02 |
| 7. | "I'm Young" | | 4:11 |
| 8. | "Secrets of the Heart" | Hinton; Hawkes | 3:54 |
| 9. | "This Is Me" | Hinton; Thom Hardwell; Alan Shacklock | 3:36 |
| 10. | "Ordinary Girl" | | 3:34 |
| 11. | "A Crazy World Like This" | Billy Steinberg; Tom Kelly; Neil Geraldo | 3:37 |
| 12. | "Say Mama" (Available on CD and download versions only) | Johnny Meeks; Johnny Earl | 2:11 |
| Total length: | | | 43:38 |

U.S. version (The One and Only)
| No. | Title | Writer(s) | Length |
|---|---|---|---|
| 1. | "The One and Only" | Kershaw | 3:44 |
| 2. | "Waiting for the Night" | Desmond Child; Robbie Seidman | 4:01 |
| 3. | "I'm a Man Not a Boy" | Hinton; Harding; Hawkes | 4:00 |
| 4. | "Feel So Alive" | | 4:48 |
| 5. | "Nothing Serious" (U.S. version) | | 3:59 |
| 6. | "Torn in Half" | Hinton; Hawkes | 4:02 |
| 7. | "One World" | Kershaw | 4:19 |
| 8. | "Secrets of the Heart" | Hinton; Hawkes | 3:54 |
| 9. | "It's Gonna Be Tough" | | 2:30 |
| 10. | "Ordinary Girl" | | 3:34 |
| 11. | "I'm Young" | | 4:11 |
| 12. | "Say Mama" | Meeks; Earl | 2:11 |
| Total length: | | | 45:01 |

== Charts ==
=== Weekly charts ===
| Chart (1991) | Peak position |
|---|---|
| Austrian Albums (Ö3 Austria) | 2 |
| German Albums (Offizielle Top 100) | 28 |
| Swedish Albums (Sverigetopplistan) | 29 |
| Swiss Albums (Schweizer Hitparade) | 25 |
| UK Albums (OCC) | 18 |

=== Year-end charts ===
| Chart (1991) | Position |
|---|---|
| Austrian Albums (Ö3 Austria) | 38 |
