= Time Bomb (1984 film) =

- Genre: Action; Drama
- Teleplay by: Westbrook Claridge
- Story by: Roderick Taylor
- Directed by: Paul Krasny
- Starring: Billy Dee Williams; Merlin Olsen; Joseph Bottoms; Morgan Fairchild
- Music by: Sylvester Levay
- Country of origin: United States
- Original language: English

Production
- Executive producer: Bari Carrelli
- Producers: James Duff McAdams (as James McAdams); Mike Snyder (as Michael Snyder); Barry J. Weitz (as Barry Weitz); Tom Thayer (uncredited); Clara George
- Production location: Dallas
- Cinematography: Don Reddy
- Editors: Donald Hoskinson; Donald R. Rode; David A. Simmons
- Running time: 95 minutes
- Production companies: Barry Weitz Films; Universal Television

Original release
- Network: NBC
- Release: March 25, 1984

Time Bomb is a 1984 made-for-TV action-adventure movie.

== Background ==
Critic Robert Cettl described Time Bomb as an update on 1970s trucker films and noted the unusual move of casting a woman to play the leader of a terrorist ring. The film was viewed as a slight departure from Fairchild and Olsen's images. Fairchild was cast to draw her large soap opera audience, Fairchild, who described her prior roles as largely "exploitative glitz," said she appreciated the grittier material. Some critics, however, were skeptical of the casting.

== Plot summary ==
The film features Renee DeSalles, a charismatic, seductive terrorist of Algerian descent known as the most wanted terrorist in the world. She and her gang target an armored truck taking weapons-grade plutonium across Texas. It is up to a three-man team of "transport specialists" sent there to stop them.

== Cast ==
- Billy Dee Williams as Wes Tanner
- Joseph Bottoms as Daniel 'Dan' Picard
- Merlin Olsen as Jake Calahan
- Morgan Fairchild as Renee DeSalles
- Anne Kerry as Tracy
- Colin Lane as Sean Marchand
- Tom McFadden as Atherton
- Chad Redding as Laura
- Dianne B. Shaw as Cara
- Sandra Fish as Judy Mallory (as Sandi Fish)
