= Ghost Game (novel) =

2011 novel by Nigel Hinton

- Cover of the first edition
- Author: Nigel Hinton
- Language: English
- Genre: Teenage fiction
- Publisher: Heinemann
- Publication date: 19 May 2011
- Publication place: United Kingdom
- Media type: Hardback
- ISBN: 978-0435045951

Ghost Game is a novel by British author Nigel Hinton which was first published in 2011. It is part of Heinemann's Heroes series, which is designed to appeal to reluctant readers in the schools market.

The book follows the story of a father and son who start a new life in a new town after the loss of the mother and younger son of the family. Danny believes that their temporary house was haunted by a boss from his late brother's favourite video game. A nonfiction section by Christopher Lee about ghosts follows the story.

== Concept ==
When the author was approached by Pearson PLC to contribute to the Heroes series, he thought about the violent books on the market and wanted to write something powerful and dramatic. It was also inspired by Hinton's nephew Joey Lager, to whom the novel is dedicated.
