= Beaver Towers: The Dark Dream =

1997 novel by Nigel Hinton

- Cover of the first edition
- Author: Nigel Hinton
- Language: English
- Genre: Children's fiction, fantasy
- Publisher: Puffin Books
- Publication date: 25 September 1997
- Media type: Paperback, e-book
- ISBN: 978-0140383898
- Preceded by: Beaver Towers: the Dangerous Journey

Beaver Towers: The Dark Dream is a 1997 novel by British author Nigel Hinton. It is the fourth and final installment in the Beaver Towers series. It follows the story of Philip on his travels with Mr Edgar and the animals of Beaver Towers when a monster called Retsnom tries to control them.
