= Time Bomb (Hinton novel) =

2005 novel by Nigel Hinton

- Cover of the first edition
- Author: Nigel Hinton
- Language: English
- Genre: Teenage fiction
- Publisher: Puffin Books (original UK), Tricycle Press (original USA), CB Creative
- Publication date: 6 January 2005
- Publication place: United Kingdom
- Media type: Print (hardback, paperback), e-book
- ISBN: 978-0141318332

Time Bomb is a novel by British author Nigel Hinton which was first published in 2005. It is set in 1949 and tells the story of four boys who find an un exploded bomb where they play.

== Concept ==
The concept came to the author whilst he was waiting at traffic lights in his car. He thought of the sentence 'I've never told this story to anyone because when I was twelve I swore on an oath in blood that I would never tell it.' It is also based on his childhood in the post-war years.

== Reception ==
Inis Magazine praised the narrative of the lives of the youngsters and the glimpses into their fears and their emotions.
