= La-Tha-Pii =

Ghost Game
- Thai poster.
- Directed by: Sarawut Wichiensarn
- Produced by: Napat Pavaputanont; Na Mahasarakam; Pantham Thongsang
- Starring: Pachornpol Jantieng; Supatsiri Patomnupong; Thanyanan Mahapirun
- Distributed by: NGR
- Release date: April 27, 2006
- Running time: 100 minutes
- Country: Thailand
- Language: Thai
- Box office: 77 ล้านบาทไทย

Ghost Game (Thai: ล่า-ท้า-ผี; RTGS: La Tha Phi, or La-Tha-Pii) is a 2006 Thai horror film about 11 contestants on a reality TV show who must stay in an abandoned military prison where atrocities took place years before.

== Plot ==
1976 in Jedah, the Communist Jiam separatist leader and his men stormed the camp S-11 on his home island Krujaba, he ordered a massacre of the present government soldiers and took 10,000 inhabitants as hostages. When government troops stormed the island, he had executed all the prisoners and killed himself on 9 May, since then the camp itself is May S-11 as a curse. A television team is this advantage, and turns in the stock S-11 a reality show in which the winner gets 5 million baht. The aim is to endure as long as possible in the eerie ruins, with the batch of eleven young people, including Dao and Yut, which were already at the last game this season and Kemtid and Jay. The ghosts make all of their lives difficult and die.

== Cast ==
- Pachornpol Jantieng as Yut
- Kittilak Chulakrian
- Wacharin Jinamulee
- Chanetphaka Korsuwan
- Thanyanan Mahapirun as Jay
- Taweesak Pamornpol
- Supatsiri Patomnupong as Dao
- Phongsak Rattanapong as Kemtis
- Panweth Saiyakhlaai
- Zeenam Soonthorn

== Critics ==
The film was controversial because the setting closely matched that of Tuol Sleng Genocide Museum, where the Khmer Rouge in Thailand's neighbor, Cambodia, tortured prisoners.

In the film, the prison was called S-11, which closely resembles the name the Khmer Rouge used for Tuol Sleng, S-21. It also depicts piles of skulls and bones, similar to many war memorials around Cambodia.

== Production ==
The producers of the film had in fact wanted to film inside Tuol Sleng, but were refused by the Cambodian government. The film was then made on location in Thailand.

The film outraged Cambodians and calls were made to ban all Thai products. Cambodian genocide researcher Youk Chhang has denounced the film as insensitive and a distortion of history for commercial purposes. It was another low point for Thai-Cambodian relations, which turned violent with the 2003 Phnom Penh riots.

The film's producers apologized and said they had not given the subject enough serious thought.

== Release ==
Though it was banned in Cambodia, the film was given a wide theatrical release in Thailand and later in Singapore.
