= Collision Course (Hinton novel) =

1976 novel by Nigel Hinton

- Cover of the first edition
- Author: Nigel Hinton
- Language: English
- Genre: Teenage fiction
- Publisher: Oxford University Press (original), Penguin Books, Barn Owl Books, Back to Front, CB Creative Books (current publisher)
- Publication date: 1976
- Publication place: United Kingdom
- Media type: Hardback, paperback, e-book
- ISBN: 0-19-271387-6

Collision Course is a novel by British author Nigel Hinton. It was his first book, and was published for the first time in 1976 with later editions revised. It tells the story of a teenage boy who steals a motorcycle and kills someone with it then he tries to get through his everyday life whilst trying to avoid getting caught. The novel is used in English lessons at secondary schools.

== Plot ==
On his evening walk one Wednesday night fifteen-year-old Ray got tempted by a Honda 125 motorbike outside a pub with its engine running so he got on and went for a joyride. He rode to the neighbouring village of Blackston and on his way back to the city he collided with a woman, who he saw earlier in an Austin Mini, and killed her. Ray walked back to the city and decided to take the bus rather than walk home in his weakened state. However, when the conductor came to collect the fare Ray remembered that he did not have any money on him so the conductor asked for his name and address so the company could send him a bill. Ray gave him fake details and was reminded not to go on the bus without any money and when he got home he went straight to bed and locked the door to hide his injuries from his family.

In the morning Ray washed the blood from his pillow case, hair and the inside of his hood then checked the daily newspaper. On page six was a report about the collision saying that police investigations were underway.

That afternoon in school the history teacher chose that day to teach them about Sir Robert Peel and developments in the police force including crime detection methods. A girl in the class asked a question about whether it was true that only 40% of all crimes were detected and solved then a couple of other pupils also heard about that figure reassuring Ray about the fallibility of the police. At the end of the school day Ray found on the notice board that he made it onto the school football team as a reserve but on his way out he saw a police car pull into the school gates so Ray went back in see what it was about. Ray waited outside the headmaster's office trying to listen but only caught a few short words. Back home Ray's mother told him that his grandmother was ill which she was worried about and he made her more upset when he told her that he forgot to buy the sausages for tea that he promised her he would get. In the bath Ray thought about committing suicide using a razor blade but decided against it deciding that he would get through the whole affair of his guilt.

The next morning at breakfast Ray checked the local weekly paper and it had a report of the hit and run incident on the front page where the woman was named as Mrs. Maureen Chalmers and the police were still trying to trace the rider of the stolen bike. At the table Ray was taken ill and his mother told him to stay home and rest then he reassured her that he would be all right at home whilst she visited her mother who had the doctor round.

In the afternoon Ray felt better and decided to go to school. When he got there his friend Dave Fitzroy told him that Mrs. Chalmers was the wife of a school governor so they had a minutes silence and prayers for her in assembly that morning. After English and PE lessons he went home where his mother told him that grandma was not too good and the doctor said she would have to go to hospital for a check-up.

That evening Ray went for a ride on his push bike having the urge to return to the scene of the crime. At the collision site was a signboard with a police appeal for witnesses.

The next morning Ray had a football match with the school team at another school. Rays team won though he injured an opponent by accident but his teammates and PE teacher agreed that it was a fair tackle.

At home that afternoon Ray was told that grandma was much worse and she would probably have to have an operation. After lunch Ray stayed behind to look after his eight-year-old brother Derek, from whom their parents kept Grandma's illness secret, while they went back to the hospital. After they left Ray decided to write a letter to the police to get them off the scent. He cut and pasted the words out of newspapers and wrote the address with his left hand to make it untraceable. He made it seem like he was older, lived outside the area and was going to commit suicide then he waited for an opportunity to post it from another area.

That evening he went to a party round Chris Gilligan's house, whose parents were out, to celebrate the football victory. After getting drunk on wine Ray met a girl named Anna who he liked and danced with her. Just before he left Anna told Ray that he could phone her and her number was in the book.

When Ray got home he slept until 12.35 in the day. His parents were out but Derek told him that they were round Grandma's then they came back for lunch. Mum told Ray that someone had to go and see Grandma again but was concerned that Derek would get suspicious if his parents went twice in one day so she suggested that Ray went instead. The family car broke down so Ray had to take the bus to the hospital after lunch.

When Ray got there he walked past his Grandmother who had changed almost beyond recognition. When he found her he talked about the football match, the party and meeting Anna. Whilst he was waiting for the next bus Ray found a photograph in the Foyer with Mrs. Chalmers in a group presenting a hospital bus. He telephoned Anna after finding her number but felt nervous now that he was no longer under the influence of the wine. Before he got on the bus he met his friend Dave's mother and they went on together. To his shock Ray saw that the conductor was the same as the one on the night of the collision so Ray kept his head down. There was a delay whilst Mrs. Fitzroy was hoping to get change for a note then the conductor recognized Ray.

Ray ran from the bus and darted down side streets and hid in an open garage to catch his breath. He went to the hospital to ask the receptionist about his Grandma to explain why he got off the bus, then Ray decided that he needed to pull himself together so he went to the cinema. He phoned home to before he went to explain to Derek where he was. The cashier let him in without checking his age, despite the film being age restricted.

After the film Ray phoned home and was told that the police were round the house, they found the letter that Ray left on his bedside table hoping to get an opportunity to post it. Dad told him that they thought he was dead and they wanted him to come home.

== Concept ==
After getting bored with a book he was using whilst teaching English, the author's class suggested he write something better. Hinton thought about an ordinary boy like the boys in his class who did something crazy. The class enjoyed the story and encouraged him to get it published.

== Awards ==
Collision Course won the Dutch Silver Pen prize in 1978.

== Revisions ==
The first revision came in 1980 when Penguin Books published Collision Course under their Puffin Books brand. Penguin toned down the language with most of the profanity removed or replaced with euphemisms but otherwise they remained largely faithful to the first edition and continued using the Oxford spelling.

In later editions, the other publishers modernized the references to culture and technology from the 1970s and exact prices removed, though they retained the Oxford spelling.

Collision Course was first published as an e-book in 2013, though with various errors.

The table below lists the differences between the first edition and the 2004 and 2009 revisions.

Chapter number	Edition, year and ISBN		
Chapter number	Oxford University Press First edition (1976) (ISBN 0-19-271387-6)	Barn Owl Books edition (2004) (ISBN 1-903015-42-1)	Back to Front edition (2009) (ISBN 978-1-904529-46-0)
1	Ray played one side of heavy rock then looked at his records trying to decide what to play next. He knew them all so well and wished he could buy something new.		Ray looked through his playlist and it all seemed so boring.
1	Ray shouted 'Yah!'	Yah was rephrased to 'Yeah!'	
2	The conductor asked for five pence and Ray pointed this out when he was asked for his name and address.	The price of the bus fare is not mentioned.	
5	Ray's mother gave him 50 pence to pay for one and a half pounds of sausages.	The amount of money Ray's mum gave him is not specified.	
7	Ray thought about how differently he thought about the history lesson compared to before the collision and compared it with the time his father changed his car.	This line was removed starting with the Penguin Books revision (1980).	
7	The history teacher noted that the police used shreds of clothing and dirt under the finger-nails to detect crimes.		This was rephrased to DNA or tiny shreds of clothing.
7	Ray could hear the secretary's typewriter when he was trying to listen to the police talking to the headmaster.		The word typewriter was changed to keyboard.
9	Ray played a record whilst doing his homework. When the LP finished he let needle crackle and hiss in the groove then lifted the arm and turned off the record player.	Ray still played the record but the reference to the working of the record player is removed.	Ray played some music but the format is not mentioned.
10	Ray pulled the chain to flush the toilet.		Pulled the chain was rephrased to flushed the toilet.
10	When Ray felt sorry for other people in trouble he thought about a woman who stole a dress worth £14.	The value of the dress is no longer mentioned.	
10	When he thought about writing the letter Ray noted that written or typed letters can be traced.		This line was changed so Ray noted that cutting out letters from a newspaper was safer than writing it.
11	When Mum offered to wash Ray's football kit Ray said he would do them upstairs in the sink.	A new line was added. Ray said he would wash his football kit because they were not really dirty so it was not worth doing by machine.	
12	When he went cycling Ray got his bike from the coal shed.	Ray got his bike from the shed. The type of shed is no longer specified.	
15	When Ray was about to lick the envelope after writing the letter he remembered that the police could get clues even from a spit.	The last words were changed to they could even get clues from spit.	The line was changed to He realized they could get his DNA from spit.
15	When Ray fussed over Derek taking the football magazine with the letter he said Well, where the hell is it? When he got the answer he said Don't you ever bloody take things from my room or I'll belt you. When he found the magazine he thought That damned kid.	The lines were rephrased to where on Earth is it? and Don't you ever dare to take things from my room. The line That damned kid was removed.	The line where the hell is it? was reinstated. This is the only example of reversed censorship in Collision Course.
16	At the party Ray thought about selecting the records to play then he saw that Chris was using the cassette recorder deciding not to risk his records in the crowd.	The line was removed.	
16	When thinking about relationships Ray noted that a large number of boys in his class had still never been out with girls but they did not care about that.	The line was removed.	
16	When Ray returned to the party after his stroll Ian yelled Hey, whatcher Chopper!		Whatcher was changed to wotcher.
17	When Ray woke up at 12.15 he thought his watch had stopped. He held it to his ear and heard that it was still ticking.		Ray looked at the watch and saw that the minute hand was still working.
17	When the meal was waiting Mum said that Derek will be in in a minute.		The line was rephrased to Derek will be here in a minute.
17	Dad gave Ray a pound note as an apology for not being able to take him in the car and losing his temper over it.	The denomination of the note is not specified.	
17	Ray thought about checking Anna's number in the phone book.		Ray thought about phoning directory enquiries.
18	In the hospital foyer Ray found an inscription below a photograph with Mrs Chalmers saying Hospital Bus. Presented by the friends of Central Hospital, 1967.	The year was removed from the inscription.	
18	Ray researched Anna's telephone number in the phone book then he inserted a ten pence coin into the hospital payphone.	The denomination of the coin is no longer specified.	Ray phoned directory enquiries on his mobile phone then the operator connected him.
19	When they got on the bus Mrs. Fitzroy insisted they sat downstairs because she did not like the smoke.	Mrs. Fitzroy does not say why she wanted to sit downstairs.	
19	Mrs. Fitzroy got out a pound note hoping to get change for a meter then the conductor asked for twelve pence.	Ray and Mrs. Fitzroy both asked for tickets to Kirtley Cross. The price of the fare, the denomination of the note and why Mrs. Fitzroy wanted the change is no longer specified.	
19	When Ray was thinking he commented that he had gone straight into the only witness and did as good shouted You don’t remember me, do you?	The line was changed to He had blundered into the only witness and as good as shouted, 'Do you remember me?'	
19	Ray supposed that the conductor stopped the bus at the next phone box and phoned the police straight away or waited until he got to the bus station.	The line was removed.	
19	When Ray phoned home before going to the cinema he used the phonebox just outside it. The pips (pay tone) obscured the voice at the other end and he hesitated before pushing the coin in.	The reference to the pips was removed.	Ray used his mobile to phone home then he turned it off before going in.
19	The cashier sold Ray the ticket despite the film having an X certificate.	X film was rephrased to 18 film.	
20	After the film Ray used the phonebox to phone home. When his Dad said they were worried the phone's handset slipped from Ray's grasp and clattered down, knocking against the coin box.		Ray turned his mobile back on and saw that he had eight missed calls all from home. The phone slipped from Ray's grasp and clattered on the ground.
