= Nigel Hinton =

English novelist

- Born: 1941 (age 84–85); London, England
- Occupation: Novelist
- Spouse(s): Rolande Lager (1980–present)
- Writing career
- Genres: Teenage and children's fiction
- Notable works: Buddy (1982); Beaver Towers (1980); Collision Course (1976)

Nigel Hinton (born 1941) is an English novelist, primarily of fiction for teenagers.

== Career ==
Hinton worked in advertising for two years, then taught English for nine years at the Hugh Christie School in Tonbridge, Kent. He then worked as a professional actor and did some teaching part-time before deciding to concentrate on writing. He has published at least twenty three novels from Collision Course (1976) to The Norris Girls (2017), including the Buddy trilogy for teenagers and the Beaver Towers stories for younger children. His novel The Finders won the Federation of Children's Book Groups Award, and Collision Course won the Dutch Silver Pen Award. His novel Out of the Darkness won the Lancashire Book Award and the Stockport Book Award. His novel Time Bomb, set in 1949 in the area in which he grew up, won the 2006 Rotherham Book Award. In 2014 his short novel Partners In Crime won the Coventry Inspiration Book Award.

He has adapted some of his novels for dramatic production, notably Buddy which was made into a BBC television series, and Buddy's Song which was made into a feature film. Both features starred Roger Daltrey as Buddy's father Terry. He has also written a number of original scripts for television and theatre.

Hinton's work is used much by schools, and Buddy has been one of the best selling for teenagers. Teachers particularly appreciate his novels because they appeal to a wide range of pupil ability including those who do not normally like reading. However, The Norris Girls, written for girls, is different from the usual boy appeal of his novels; it is based partly on Little Women and all the protagonists are female although the writing style is otherwise the same.

Regarding music, Hinton co-wrote the song "Take Me Home" for Roger Daltrey's 1987 album Can't Wait to See the Movie. He also contributed to the soundtrack of Buddy's Song by co-writing nine songs, all performed by Chesney Hawkes who played Buddy in the film. He co-wrote the song "Always Heading Home" for Roger Daltrey's 2018 album As Long As I Have You. He has also written a number of songs for the UK Americana band The Orange Circus Band including the song "I Miss You".

== List of works ==
=== Teenage fiction ===
- Collision Course (1976) (Text was modernised from 2004 e.g. the X films became 18 films and the £1 notes are just notes. By 2009 the vinyl records became playlists and the payphones are now mobiles. The chocolate machine outside the sweet shop and the conductor on the bus which are both essential to the plot remain present).
- Getting Free (1978)
- Buddy (1982)
- Buddy's Song (1987)
- Buddy's Blues (1995)
- Out of the Darkness (1998)
- Ship of Ghosts (1999)
- Partners in Crime (2003)
- Time Bomb (2005)
- Until Proven Guilty (2006)
- 2 Die 4 (2009)
- Walk the Wild Road (2009) (originally published as The Road from Home. Adopted the current title in 2011)
- On the Edge (2014)
- Daredevil (2015)
- The Norris Girls (2017)

Series contributed to

- Ghost Game (2011) part of the Heroes series

=== Children's fiction ===
- Beaver Towers (1980)
- Beaver Towers: the Witch's Revenge (1981)
- Beaver Towers: the Dangerous Journey (1986) (Originally published as Run to Beaver Towers. Adopted the current title in 1997).
- The Finders (1993)
- Beaver Towers: the Dark Dream (1997)

=== Adult fiction ===
- The Heart of the Valley (1986)

=== Fiction for people learning English ===
- Blood Ties (2000)

=== Television ===
- Buddy (1986)
- Cafe des Reves (BBC Education French Series)
- Clementine (BBC Education French Series)
- Isabel (BBC Education Spanish Series)
- The Reaper (ITV PLayhouse)

=== Film script ===
- Buddy's Song (1990)

=== Music ===
Album contributed to

- Buddy's Song (co-wrote) (1991) (Released in the United States as The One and Only) Performed by Chesney Hawkes.

Singles contributed to

- "Take Me Home" (Roger Daltrey song) (co-wrote) (1987)
- "Always Heading Home" (Roger Daltrey song) (co-wrote) (2018)
- "I Miss You" (The Orange Circus Band song) (2018)
