= Buddy's Song (film) =

1991 film by Claude Whatham

- Theatrical release poster
- Directed by: Claude Whatham
- Screenplay by: Nigel Hinton
- Based on: Buddy's Song by Nigel Hinton
- Produced by: Roger Daltrey; Bill Curbishley; Roy Baird; Ron Bareham
- Starring: Chesney Hawkes; Roger Daltrey
- Cinematography: John Hooper
- Edited by: John Grover
- Music by: Alan Shacklock
- Production company: Buddy Productions Ltd.
- Distributed by: Castle Premier Releasing; Fox Video
- Release date: 1 March 1991 (United Kingdom)
- Running time: 102 minutes
- Country: United Kingdom
- Language: English
- Budget: £1.4 million
- Box office: £8,017 (UK)

Buddy's Song is a 1991 British comedy-drama film starring Chesney Hawkes, Roger Daltrey, Sharon Duce and Michael Elphick, based on the 1987 novel of the same name by Nigel Hinton. The film follows a teenage boy, Buddy Clark (Hawkes), who is determined to make it as a pop star, aided by his father Terry (Daltrey). He struggles with young love, estranged parents and the problems associated with making it in the music business.

The film was accompanied by a soundtrack album which featured Hawkes' song "The One and Only". It was filmed in London and various towns in the Thames Valley. The long-running teddy boy Rockabilly group The Flying Saucers play the roles of themselves in the film. Playing the part of Terry's friends, they offer support by rehearsing with Buddy and becoming his backing band. Buddy contributes vocals and rhythm guitar while Sandy Ford handles lead guitar duties.

The film was a sequel to the 1986 BBC television series Buddy, which starred Daltrey in the same role (it featured Wayne Goddard as Buddy, however). Daltrey, Bill Curbishley and Roy Baird acted as producers for the film and Daltrey also served as musical director. The film was released with a 12 certificate in cinemas on 1 March 1991 and was re-rated PG with cuts (made by the distributor prior to submission to the BBFC) made to tone down the nudity and violence, for home video as the 12 certificate was not available on this format in the UK at the time.

The film was released on VHS in late 1991 with a music video for "The One and Only" performed by Hawkes and an exclusive interview with Hawkes as special features. The film has, so far, never been officially released on DVD or any other modern home video format. However, the whole film was posted uncut onto Hawkes' official YouTube channel on 22 June 2020.

== Plot ==
Buddy Clark and his father, Terry, go to see live rock 'n' roll at a hotel. Terry meets Des King in the car park who pays him to keep a briefcase in his car which Buddy is sure was stolen. Buddy's mother, Carol, arrives; then Buddy attempts to get his estranged parents to talk. Buddy moves the briefcase of jewellery back into Des's Jaguar, then tells Terry when he mentions he is going to move his Vauxhall. Terry fears the police are going to look in Des's car first so he gets the briefcase, but the police catch him in the act and he goes to prison.

Buddy spends his free time practising the guitar and polishing his father's car. Des King visits and offers Carol an envelope of cash but she refuses to take it. Buddy visits his father in prison after his mother convinces him. Whilst talking to his friend Julius, Buddy notices his mother is seeing her boss Adrian Mandell a lot. Buddy records a tape of himself playing the guitar for his father, and he suggests going into music but Carol wants Buddy to concentrate on his school work. Terry is released on parole two weeks later and Des King gives them a lift home. They see that Des has Terry's house redecorated where he gives Terry the cash Carol refused. Terry gets Carol to move back in, but rows later arise between them. Terry gets an electric guitar and an amplifier along with a keyboard for Buddy and a camcorder for himself, which gives him the idea of advertising in the local newspaper to film weddings.

Terry resigns from his job at the bookmaker and starts working for Des King at his breakers yard. Terry then arranges to have Buddy play with a band of middle-aged men called the Hi-Tones who recently lost their singer. They perform gigs at the wedding receptions Terry films. Terry goes to a party at Carol's office where he meets her boss. This leads to Buddy's parents having a row at home. When Terry tries to help Carol after she drops a milk bottle, she says she does not need him and he leaves.

Terry moves into the caravan at the breakers yard where Buddy visits him. Meanwhile, Julius finds a band called the Hurt and Buddy plays with them at the milk depot. Buddy joins Glenn the milkman, along with Mike and Jason, and Julius becomes their manager and tambourine player. Buddy goes to a Teddy boy pub to perform with the Hi-Tones where Terry meets a young woman named Dawn; then a fight breaks out after Terry unplugs the jukebox. Terry and the band, along with Dawn, leave in the van. In the morning, Buddy is angered to find Dawn in the caravan with Terry and walks off. Terry catches up with him, where they argue and Buddy tells him he is now in his own band. The Hurt perform at youth clubs. After seeing them perform, Terry meets with the band backstage. He advises them to make him the manager to help them get to the top, fearing that no record company will do a deal with someone of Jules' age. The band agree.

On their first gig with Terry as their manager, they perform at the Manhattan Club where the sound system fails. Terry gets them a studio session and arranges a tour where they perform fourteen gigs in fourteen days. As they discuss it, Terry tells Buddy that he does like Dawn a lot but does not love her. On the tour the band discover that Terry has changed the name to the Wild Ones, as he never liked the Hurt. When they get back, Buddy goes to see his girlfriend Elaine, but is disgusted to find Glenn alone in the house with her. At band practice, Glenn apologises and Buddy forgives him, though he does not want Elaine back.

At the breakers yard Terry films a music video for the band's song Nothing Serious and hands the tape to the video editor Donald to be dubbed and cut. Terry finds a note on the caravan door that reads 'Get stuffed' from Dawn then hears a howl of pain from the office. Terry finds two men attacking Des and manages to shift them off him but he gets stabbed. Buddy telephones his mother and she joins him at the hospital to see Terry. At band practice Julius who temporarily replaces Terry gets Kelly, who Buddy fancied, to help get the single of "Nothing Serious" in the shops and radio stations and request it on the radio.

When Terry gets out of hospital, he gets in touch with Bobby Rosen at Mammoth Records. He likes the record and the music video so they go to the studio. After a recording session, Bobby speaks to the band in private in the booth but Terry hears on the speakers. Bobby tells them they will have to change the name of the band and they will have to go without Terry because he is inexperienced and has a criminal record. Buddy catches up with his father who advises him to go back and sign with them. The rest of the band comes along, and Terry tells them he is going to concentrate on the videos with Donald. Julius tells Terry that if he had them under a contract when he took over management he would have screwed money out of him for compensation. This gives Terry the idea of getting money for a new video studio called Video King.

At the opening ceremony of Video King, Buddy invites his parents to a meal for his birthday. Carol suggests a new Italian restaurant, and they go with Kelly. The film ends with Terry arriving at the restaurant in style.

== Cast ==
- Chesney Hawkes as Buddy Clark
- Roger Daltrey as Terry Clark
- Sharon Duce as Carol Clark
- Michael Elphick as Des King
- Douglas Hodge as Bobby Rosen
- Paul McKenzie as Julius
- Lee Ross as Jason
- Nick Moran as Mike
- Colin Peel as Glenn
- James Aubrey as Adrian
- Liza Walker as Elaine
- Emma Amos as Dawn
- Julia Sawalha as Kelly
- Billy Murray as Harry
- Alan Ford as Phil
- Sandy Ford as Themselves
- Tracey Southwood as a Roller Skater

== Soundtrack ==
Eleven songs from the film, performed by Hawkes, were released on CD and vinyl in 1991. The album is known as The One and Only in the United States, as the film did not see a wide release there. Three singles from the album were released: "The One and Only", "I'm a Man Not a Boy" and "Secrets of the Heart".

The songs Brain Train and Taking the Blame, which were not included in the original soundtrack release, have since been released, along with the other master mixes for the film and the demo track Peggy Sue, as part of Hawkes' 2022 compilation The Complete Picture: The Albums 1991–2012.
