= Chesney Hawkes =

British singer (born 1971)

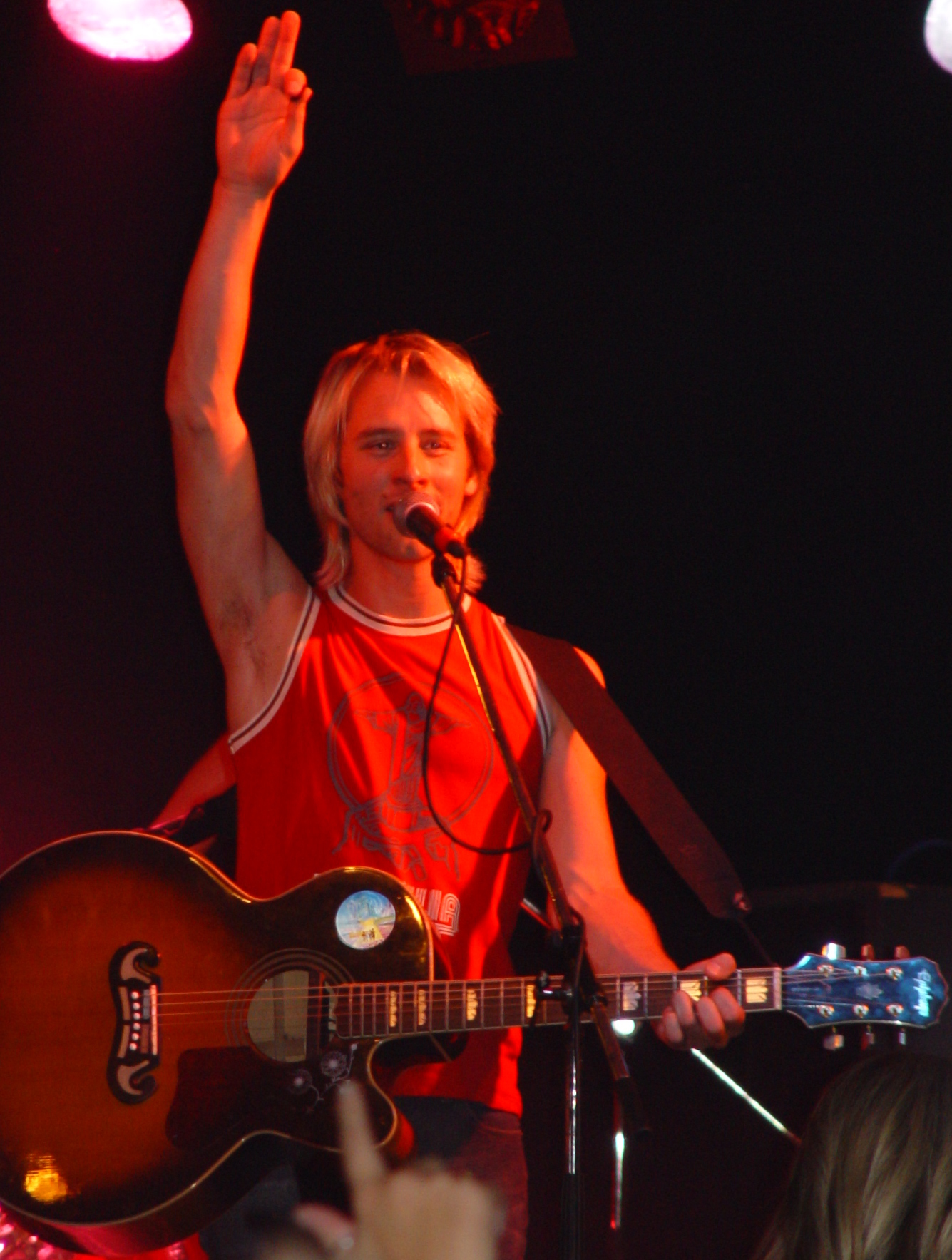
- Hawkes in 2004
- Born: Chesney Lee Hawkes; 22 September 1971 (age 55); Windsor, Berkshire, England
- Occupations: Singer; songwriter; actor
- Years active: 1990–present
- Spouse: Kristina Hawkes (m. 1997)
- Children: 3
- Father: Len Hawkes
- Musical career
- Genres: Pop rock; alternative rock
- Instruments: Vocals; guitar; piano
- Labels: Chrysalis; Right Track
- Website: www.chesneyhawkes.com

Chesney Lee Hawkes (born 22 September 1971) is an English singer and occasional actor. He started his career at the age of 19 when he appeared in the film Buddy's Song, which featured his best-known single "The One and Only", which topped the UK singles chart for five weeks and reached the top 10 in the United States. It also was featured in the 1991 film Doc Hollywood and the 2009 movie Moon. Follow-up single "I'm a Man Not a Boy" peaked at No. 27 in the UK, with subsequent singles including "What's Wrong with This Picture?", "Stay Away Baby Jane" (a collaboration with Adam Schlesinger of Fountains of Wayne) and "Another Fine Mess" also charting in the top 100.

Aside from music, Hawkes appeared on Channel 4's The Games in 2005, winning a Bronze Medal. Hawkes appeared on the shows Hit Me Baby One More Time, Let's Dance for Comic Relief, and Sing If You Can. Hawkes also appeared in the musical Can't Smile Without You in the role of Tony Lowiman.

== Early life ==
Hawkes was born in Windsor, Berkshire. He was named after the singer and comedian Chesney Allen. His father is singer and bassist Chip Hawkes of the 1960s band the Tremeloes. His mother is former actress/game-show hostess Carol Dilworth, who appeared in an episode of the 1960s version of Randall and Hopkirk (Deceased) called "For the Girl Who Has Everything", as well as the 1969 horror film The Haunted House of Horror. Keely Hawkes, his sister, was the lead singer of 1990s band Transister, and is currently a songwriter based in Los Angeles. He attended Charters School in Sunningdale. Jodie Hawkes, his brother, played drums in Chesney's band and is currently in The Tremeloes.

== Career ==
Hawkes' career began at 19, when he appeared as the title character in the film Buddy's Song. In March 1991, he released from the film’s soundtrack his biggest single "The One and Only", on which his younger brother Jodie was the drummer. The song, which was written by Nik Kershaw, spent five weeks at No. 1 in the UK Singles Chart. Hawkes has released eight singles including "I'm a Man Not a Boy" and "Secrets of the Heart".

In 1993, his single "What's Wrong with This Picture?" reached number 63 in the UK, and his 2002 collaboration with Adam Schlesinger of Fountains of Wayne, "Stay Away Baby Jane", reached number 74 in the UK Singles Chart.

On 21 March 2001, Hawkes appeared on the second episode of ITV's documentary series Holiday Airport, which followed British holidaymakers as they passed through Palma Airport, Majorca. The episode resurfaced more than 20 years later on 13 March 2022, when it was uploaded to YouTube by ITV Studios' Our Stories channel.

Hawkes returned to the media's attention with his involvement in Channel 4's The Games in March 2005, in which he won a Bronze Medal. He also took part in the ITV programme Hit Me Baby One More Time in April that year. He released a single called "Another Fine Mess" in May 2005, it reached number 48. The following album of the same title featured fifteen songs written by Hawkes.

Hawkes was involved in a project called the Lexus Symphony Orchestra, a corporate promotion designed to showcase the quality of Lexus' in-car audio systems. Hawkes composed two original pieces of music performed by the London Symphony Orchestra for these events held at Castle Howard and Crystal Palace, in August 2007.

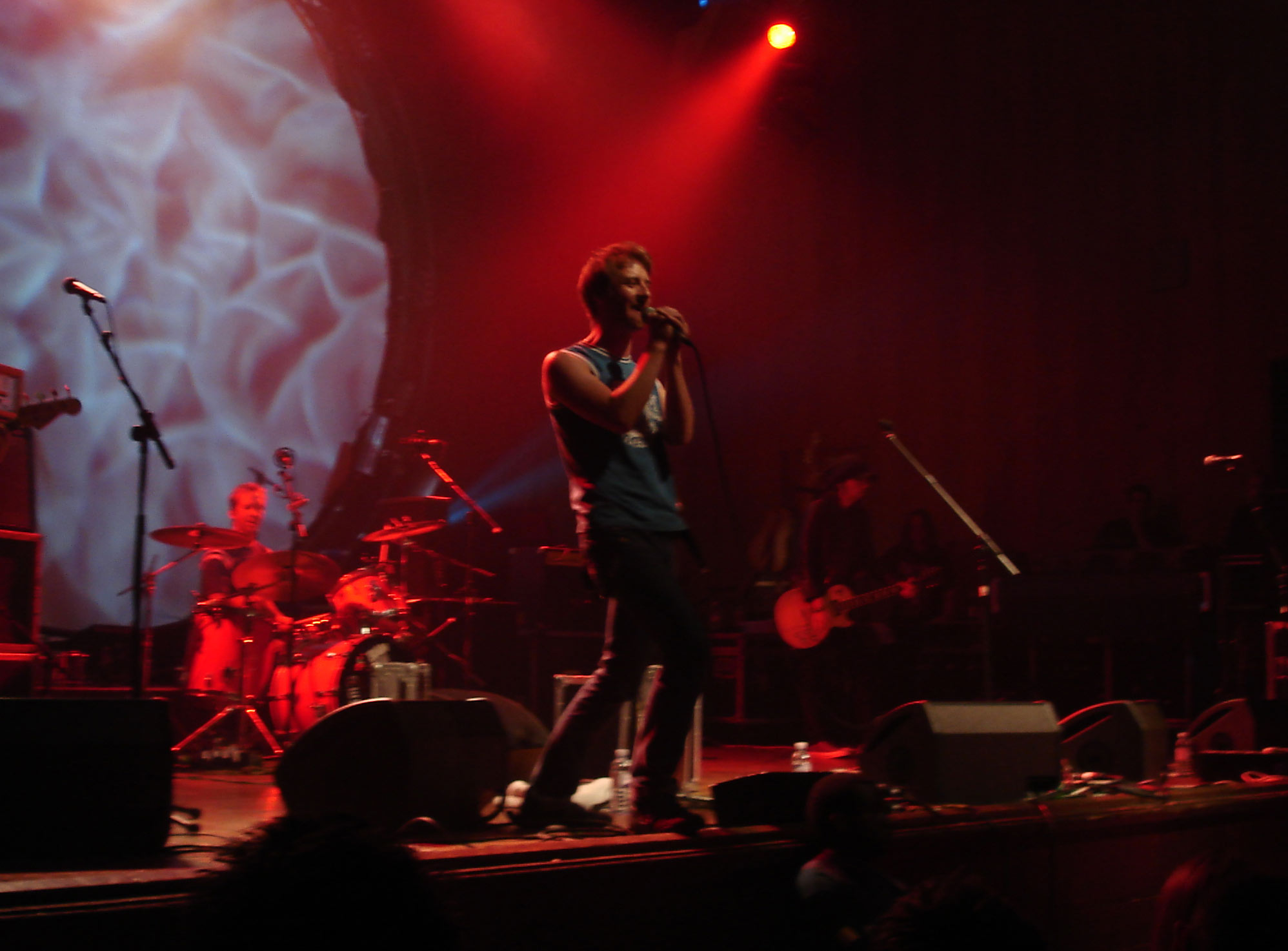
Hawkes at the University of Exeter Summer Ball, 2008

Hawkes appeared in a musical, Can't Smile Without You (featuring songs of Barry Manilow). A national tour started at the Liverpool Empire Theatre on 15 September 2008, prior to performances in the West End.

Hawkes appeared briefly in a cherry picker on Celebrity Big Brother (shown on 8 January 2009) on Channel 4. "The One and Only" was used as a cue to have contestants worship at a Chesney Hawkes shrine.

In January 2011, Hawkes performed at the live finale of Louie Spence's Showbusiness. During February and March 2011, he took part in the BBC series Let's Dance for Comic Relief. He now performs a mixture of his own material and covers at University Freshers week. In May that year, Hawkes took part in the ITV series Sing If You Can. In September, he appeared as Joseph in Joseph and the Amazing Technicolor Dreamcoat. On 24 December 2011, he appeared on the ITV programme Text Santa, with Ant & Dec.

Hawkes was due to take part on ITV's skating programme Dancing on Ice in 2012 but after fracturing his ankle, he withdrew from the programme. He was replaced by Chico Slimani. In May, Hawkes played at Lakefest festival. In December, he appeared as an accident-prone version of himself in the ITV comedy drama Panto!.

In 2014, Hawkes performed "The One and Only" with a flashmob dance group in the streets of Manchester to promote MyMate Loans. In addition, he recorded a version of the song with different lyrics for a MyMate commercial.

In 2015, Hawkes competed in Celebrity MasterChef on BBC One. He was eliminated in the first of the semi-finals of the show.

In August 2016, Hawkes was a guest on ITV's Loose Women, with his parents in the audience. He spoke about his family and also discussed his charitable work with The A21 Campaign.

On 25 March 2022, Hawkes released the box set The Complete Picture: The Albums 1991–2012, which consists of five CDs and one DVD. In addition, he released the digital single "The One and Only (2022 Nik Kershaw Remix)". In autumn 2022, he joined his father Chip and brother Jodie on the Sixties Gold Tour as part of the Tremeloes, becoming their singer for a series of dates around the UK.

On 17 February 2024, Hawkes became the Unexpected Celebrity Star Star, of Michael McIntyre's Big Show Series 7, Episode 6, for BBC One. The elaborate stunt was set up with the help of his wife Kristina, that sees him perform his song, The One and Only to a live Theatre Royal, Drury Lane audience. Hawkes was greeted on stage by his band, which also featured his guitar playing son. In April 2025, Hawkes entered the Celebrity Big Brother house to appear as a housemate on the twenty-fourth series.

From February to March 2025 Hawkes served as the special supporting act for James Blunt on his major European arena tour, which celebrated the 20th anniversary of his debut album, Back To Bedlam. The tour featured dates in major cities such as Berlin, Vienna, Paris, Amsterdam, and Brussels.

On 11 April 2025, Chesney's new album 'Living Arrows' was Radio 2's Album of the Week. In November 2025, Hawkes' website announced his UK tour dates commencing March 2026, onwards.

On November 5, 2026, following the finale of the show's 22nd series, Hawkes was announced to take part in the Taskmaster New Year Treat 2026 special, alongside Alison Hammond, Francis Bourgeois, Maryam Moshiri, and Robert Rinder.

== Personal life ==
Hawkes married his American girlfriend, Kristina, on 4 July 1997. They have three children together and had previously lived in Chertsey; they resided in Los Angeles for 12 years until moving back to Surrey in 2024. During 2025, the couple participated in the BBC's Celebrity Escape to the Country programme with an ambition to relocate from their UK rented property, using their personal purchase budget of £1.1 million targeting an established home in the Cotswolds. At the time of filming their three adult children remained in the U.S.

Hawkes is a supporter of West Ham United FC. Entrepreneur Duncan Bannatyne is a fan of Hawkes, and was surprised with a performance at his 60th birthday party in 2009.

== Discography ==
=== Albums ===
==== Studio albums ====
Title	Chart positions
Title	UK
Buddy's Song: Released: 1991; Label: Chrysalis; Formats: LP, CD, cassette	18
The One and Only: Released: October 1991; Label: Chrysalis; Formats: CD, cassette; U.S. version of Buddy's Song	—
Get the Picture: Released: 1993; Label: Chrysalis; Formats: CD, cassette	—
Another Fine Mess: Released: 2007; Label: Hawkes Productions; Formats: CD	—
Real Life Love: Released: 2012; Label: Hawkes Productions/Right Track Records; Formats: CD, digital	—
Living Arrows: Released: 2025; Label: HGLA Ltd; Formats: CD, digital	—

=== Extended plays ===
Title
Marvellous Mechanical Mouse
- Released: 2012
- Label: Sergeant Poppy Records
- Formats: CD, digital
Sunset Sessions
- Released: 2021
- Label: HGLA Ltd.
- Formats: CD, digital

=== Compilation albums ===
Title
The Very Best of Chesney Hawkes
- Released: 2005
- Label: EMI Gold
- Formats: CD

=== Box sets ===
Title
The Complete Picture: The Albums 1991–2012
- Released: 2022
- Label: Chrysalis
- Formats: 5CD + DVD

=== Singles ===
Year	Title	Peak chart positions										Album
Year	Title	UK	IRE	NED	BEL (FL)	GER	AUT	SWI	SWE	NOR	US	Album
1991	"The One and Only"	1	3	9	3	8	1	4	2	5	10	Buddy's Song/ The One and Only
1991	"I'm a Man Not a Boy"	27	25	—	20	44	—	28	32	—	—	Buddy's Song/ The One and Only
1991	"Secrets of the Heart"	57	—	—	—	68	—	—	—	—	—	Buddy's Song/ The One and Only
1992	"Feel So Alive" (US & JPN only)	—	—	—	—	—	—	—	—	—	—	Buddy's Song/ The One and Only
1993	"What's Wrong with This Picture?"	63	—	—	—	71	29	—	—	—	—	Get the Picture
1993	"Missing You Already" (NED only)	—	—	—	—	—	—	—	—	—	—	Get the Picture
1994	"Black or White People" (NED only)	—	—	—	—	—	—	—	—	—	—	Get the Picture
2002	"Stay Away Baby Jane"	74	—	—	—	—	—	—	—	—	—	Another Fine Mess
2005	"Another Fine Mess"	48	—	—	—	—	—	—	—	—	—	Another Fine Mess
2012	"Caught Up in Circles"	—	—	—	—	—	—	—	—	—	—	Real Life Love
2012	"Aeroplane"	—	—	—	—	—	—	—	—	—	—	Real Life Love
2024	"Get a Hold of Yourself"	—	—	—	—	—	—	—	—	—	—	
"—" denotes the single failed to chart or was not released.

== Filmography ==
- The Bill – "Photo Finish" (1991)
- Buddy's Song (1991)
- Prince Valiant (1997)
- Panto! (2012)
- Loose Women (2016)
- Hollyoaks (2022)
- Never Mind the Buzzcocks (2023)
- Michael McIntyre's Big Show (2024)
- Radio 2's Piano Room (2025)
- Celebrity Big Brother (2025)
- Celebrity Escape to the Country (2025)
- Taskmaster New Year Treat (2026)
