= Halara =

Chinese clothing brand

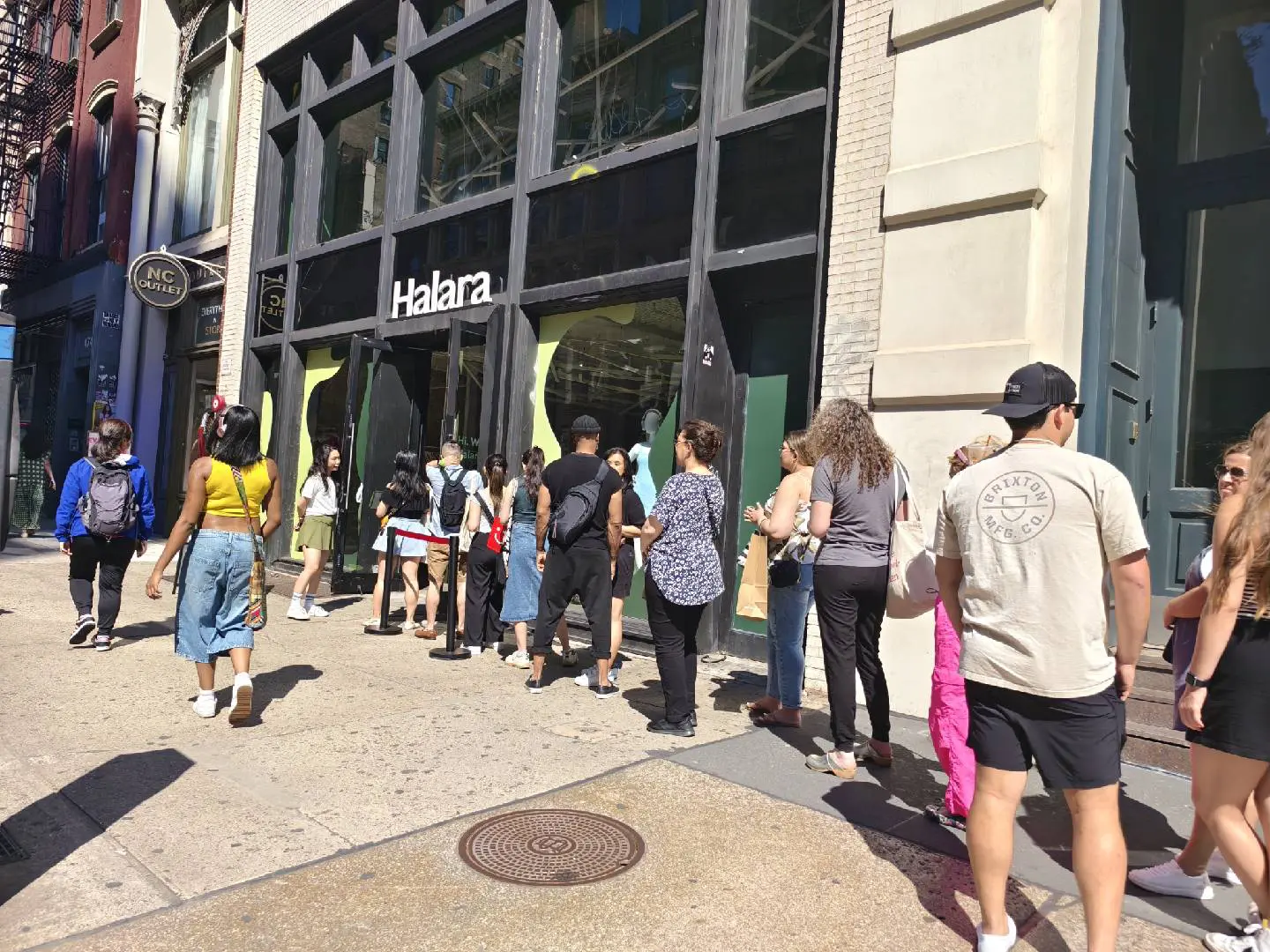
- Halara New York City
- Type: Private company
- Industry: Fashion
- Founded: 2020
- Founder: Joyce Zhang
- Headquarters: Hong Kong
- Products: Women's sportswear and casual apparel
- Website: thehalara.com

Halara is a Chinese direct-to-consumer women's athleisure brand and ecommerce platform founded by Joyce Zhang and several investment capital firms in 2020. The company has headquarters in Hong Kong.

The company's main products include leggings, exercise dresses, and skorts. Its marketing and product development strategies revolve around social media and machine learning.

== History ==
The brand was founded in 2020 by Joyce Zhang, a former chief technology officer, backed by Chinese investment firms 5Y Capital, Capital Today, IDG, Hike Capital, and Sequoia. The company has headquarters in Hong Kong. It is a brand of Doublefs, which was also formed in 2020.

== Products ==
Halara produces a wide variety of athleisure clothing including leggings, exercise dresses, joggers, and skorts. Halara has also sold denim-inspired apparel, including jeans and denim-look products made with stretch fabrics. Sizing is inclusive, ranging from XS to 3X.

In May 2024, the brand opened its first pop-up store in New York City. Another opened in Los Angeles in 2025.

== Product development and production ==
The brand uses machine learning and algorithms that analyze Google searches, Reddit discussions, other online data, and customer surveys about current and future fashion trends to develop new products. Its loyalty program rewards customers for testing new products and providing feedback. Cosmopolitan called out the company's community feedback strategy for product development.

Halara's products are manufactured in and shipped from East and Southeast Asia.

== Marketing ==
Halara markets heavily through social media, in particular TikTok, and was noted by Vox in 2021 for being "especially notorious" for its "annoying" and "pervasive" advertisements on the platform. In 2021 the New York Times said the brand was "seemingly built around" its dupe of the Outdoor Voices exercise dress. According to Marketing Brew, the company buys targeted advertising to highlight posts about their products and offers affiliate marketing to encourage influencers to create such posts.

According to The Economist in 2023, it is among "hundreds of Chinese firms [which] are experimenting with [on-demand marketing] in the American marketplace". CNN in 2025 said "Halara is chronically online" using a marketing strategy that "harnesses AI and algorithms to analyze comments on its social media posts, gathering data about what styles its customers want to see next". Halara refers to this strategy as a "community-driven approach".
