= Jours Apres Lunes =

French clothing label

Jours Apres Lunes is a French clothing label that released a collection of underwear and loungewear (termed "loungerie") for females aged 4–12. The collection was heavily criticized on release due to the imagery used in the advertisements, which was criticized by the English language media as being overly sexualised for a product aimed at children.
