= Sweatpants =

Soft trousers made for athletic or leisure purposes

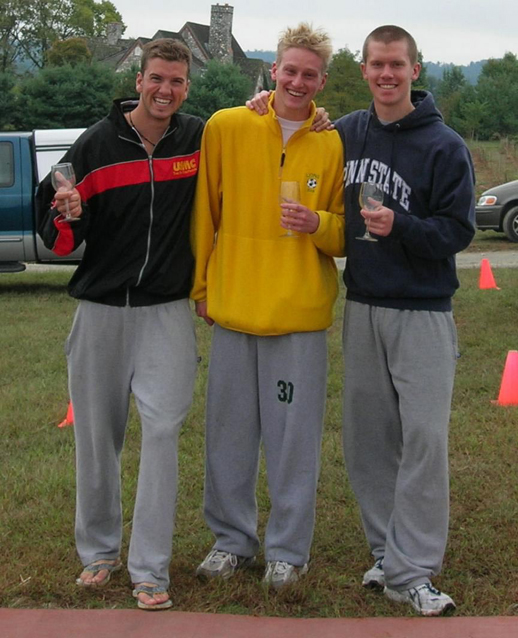
Three young men wearing traditional gray sweatpants

Sweatpants are a casual variety of soft trousers intended for comfort or athletic purposes, although they are now worn in many different situations. In Australia, New Zealand, South Africa and the United Kingdom, they are known as tracksuit bottoms or trackies. In the United Kingdom, they are also called joggers or jogging bottoms. In Australia and New Zealand, they are also commonly known as trackpants, tracky daks. In the United States and Canada they are known as sweatpants, sweats or jogging pants.

== History ==
The first pair of sweatpants was introduced in the 1920s by Émile Camuset, the founder of Le Coq Sportif. These were simple knitted gray jersey pants that allowed athletes to stretch and run comfortably. Sweatpants became commonplace at the Olympic Games by the late 1930s, and were seen on many athletes in the decades that followed. Adidas introduced the tracksuit that combined the sweatpants with a track top in 1964, which helped popularize athletic fashion. The rise of fitness culture, as well as the birth of hip hop in 1980s America, led to the popularization of sweatpants as both leisurewear and streetwear.

College students also contributed to sweatpants' rise in popularity in the United States. Since the 1910s, "sportswear" has been a staple in college campus style and in the 1970s and 80s designers began reimagining the "jersey knit fabric that had been used for gym garb" into clothes for students' everyday wear. Despite their rise in popular culture, sweatpants were often criticized in mainstream media in the 1990s and early 2000s; in the American sitcom Seinfeld, the title character, Jerry, tells his friend "you're telling the world you've given up" when he appears in sweatpants.

Fashion shifted during the COVID-19 pandemic and the resulting increase in remote work. Sales of sweatpants have increased since 2019, and many high-end fashion brands have moved toward creating simpler, athletic-casual inspired looks.

== Culture ==
At one time, these pants were only worn for sporting events and at home. Now, they are available in many fashionable styles and are worn in a variety of public situations. Because of their comfort and fashion, they have become a popular choice of clothing. Sweatpants may come from many different materials and in many forms including thick and thin. Sweatpants are sometimes associated with certain lifestyles such as gym culture or hip-hop culture. This niche-specific perception of sweatpants since the 1980s has at times resulted in extensive dress code regulations with some outlets outright banning the wearing of sweatpants on their premises, including some German cafés and a substantial number of nightclubs worldwide.

== Variations ==
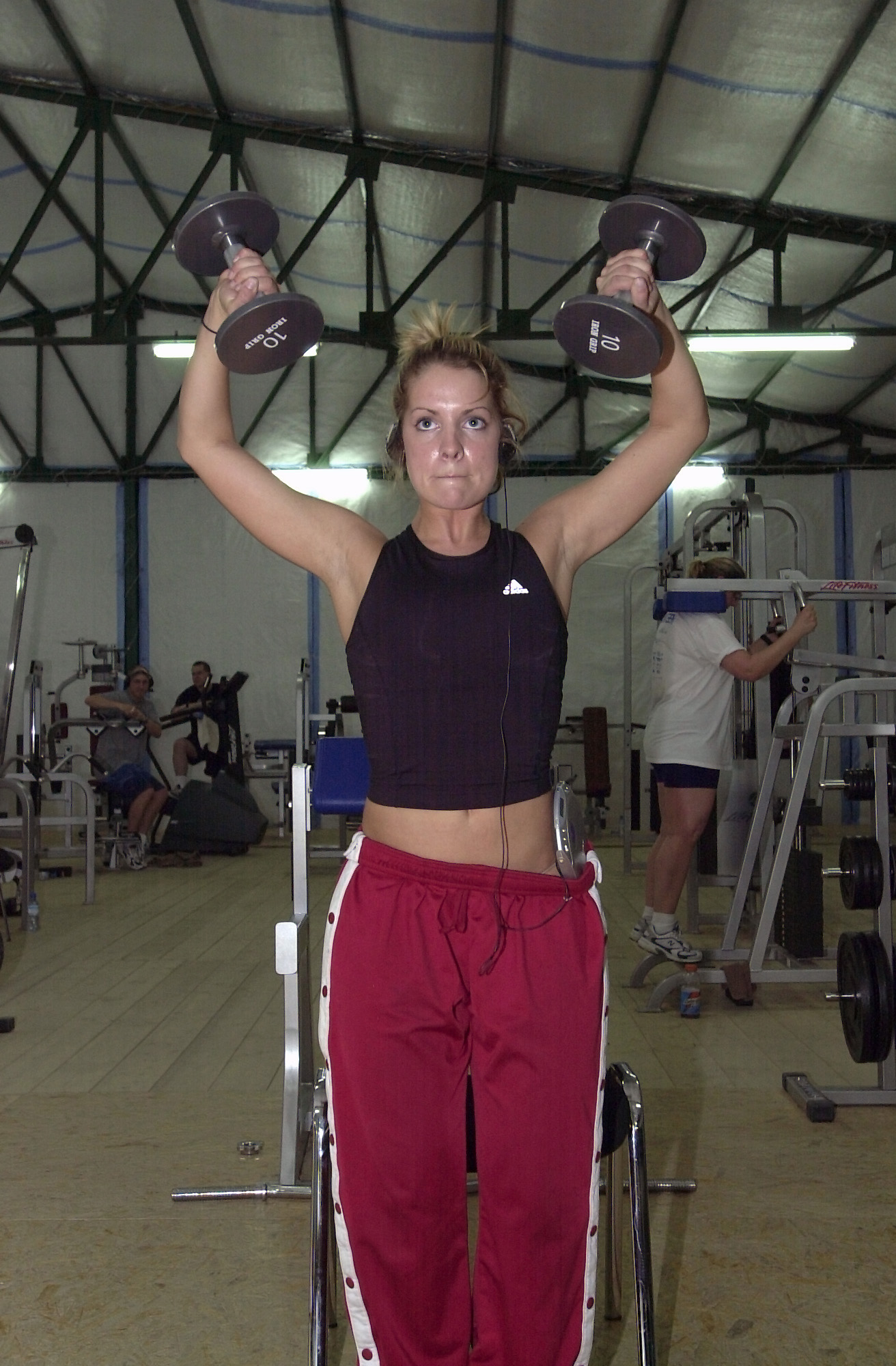
Woman wearing tearaway pants

There are many variations on sweatpants design that have evolved to define their own categories of athletic pants. These variations include fashion pants, windpants, tearaway pants, and muscle pants.

=== Fashion pants ===
Fashion pants typically refers to fashion-conscious sportswear. These pants are often made from a variety of materials, like velvet or satin, and in many color combinations or patterns. One distinguishing characteristic is that fashion pants generally lack the elastic band at the ankles. They are considered a form of athleisure wear.

=== Windpants ===
Windpants are similar to sweatpants but are lighter and shield the wearer from cold wind rather than insulate. Windpants are typically made of polyester or nylon, with a liner made of cotton or polyester. The nylon material's natural friction against both itself and human legs makes "swooshing" sounds during walking. Windpants often have zippers on each ankle, letting athletes unzip the end of each leg, allowing the pants to be pulled over their footwear.

=== Tearaway pants ===
Tearaway pants, also known as breakaway pants, rip-off pants, or popper pants are closely related to windpants. Tearaway pants are windpants with snap fasteners running the length of both legs. The snaps allow athletes to remove their tearaway pants in a timely manner to compete in some sports. Basketball and track and field are the two sports most commonly associated with tearaway pants.

== See also ==
- Leggings
- Sportswear (activewear)
- Yoga pants
