= Sportswear =

Equipment and attire for physical activity

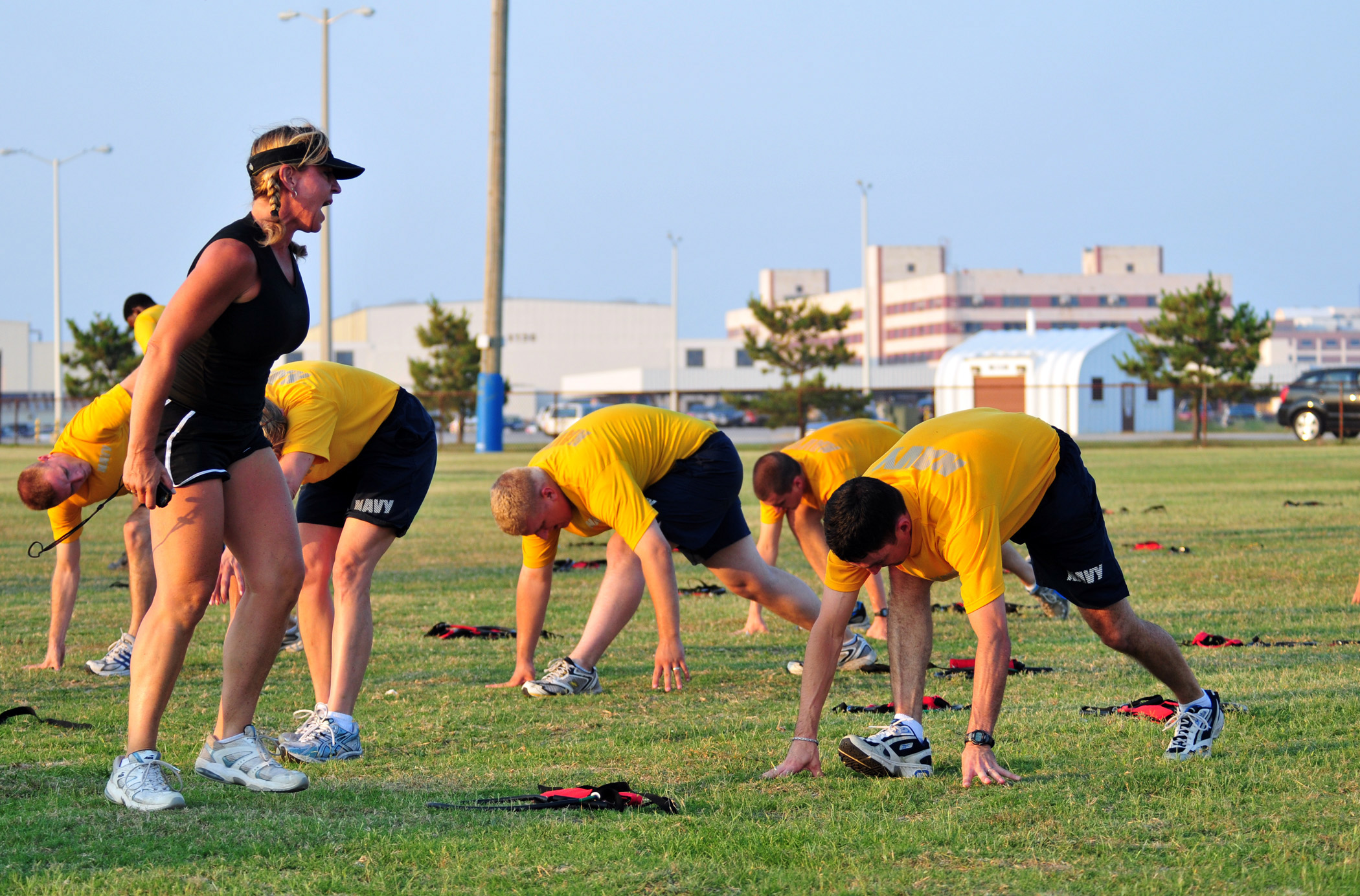
U.S. Navy sailors exercising in the presence of a fitness instructor. All of them are wearing sportswear appropriate for doing exercise.

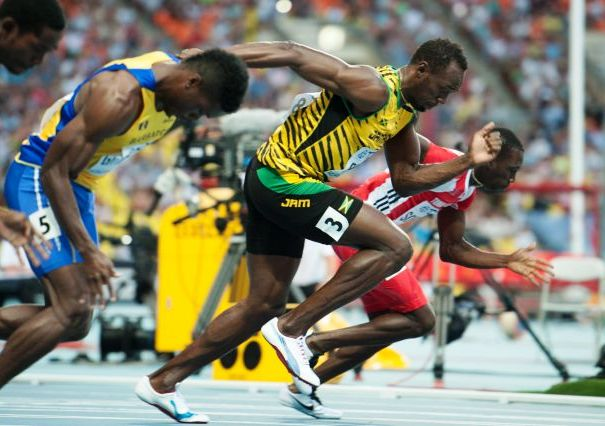
100 m race record holder Usain Bolt (in yellow) and other runners in sportswear.

Sportswear or activewear is athletic clothing, including footwear, worn for sports activity or physical exercise. Sport-specific clothing is worn for most sports and physical exercise, for practical, comfort or safety reasons.

Typical sport-specific garments include tracksuits, shorts, football or basketball jerseys, t-shirts and polo shirts. Specialized garments include swimsuits (for swimming), wet suits (for diving or surfing), ski suits (for skiing) and leotards and tights (for gymnastics or aerobics). Sports footwear includes football boots (also referred to as cletes), trainers, riding boots, tennis shoes (or running shoes), or ice skates. Sportswear also includes sports bras for running, crop tops, or a bikini top. Sportswear is often worn as casual fashion clothing.

For most sports the athletes wear a combination of different items of clothing, e.g. sport shoes, pants and shirts. In some sports, protective gear may need to be worn, such as helmets or American football body armour. Especially in team sports that involve blocking, intercepting, or pursuing small, hard projectiles such as cricket, baseball, and hockey (where balls or pucks are struck to speeds in excess of 100 miles per hour (45 m/s)), jockstraps (or jillstraps) are standard equipment at higher levels of play. Other undergarments, such as the sports bra, furnish a mixture of protection, support and comfort. Some protective or supportive orthotics resemble and function as undergarments (especially flexible harnesses and braces); though intended to be worn for sports, these are not generally conceived of as sportswear per se.

Sports fabrics are technical materials which help to keep the wearer comfortable during exercise. The type of fabric required will depend upon the intensity of the exercise and the activity. Gym or Yoga clothing uses fabrics with exceptional stretch ability for easy movement which will likely require the fabric to be cotton, nylon or lycra. Apparel for long-distance running will keep the wearer in good comfort if it has excellent moisture wicking properties to enable sweat to transfer from the inside to the outside for the garment. Performance clothing for outdoor sports in the winter or snow sports should use breathable fabrics with very good insulating properties.

== Functional considerations ==
The weight, fabrication and stretchiness of the fabric are uniquely designed to suit each sport. It is typically designed not to encumber the activity of the wearer and to facilitate exercise movement without restriction.

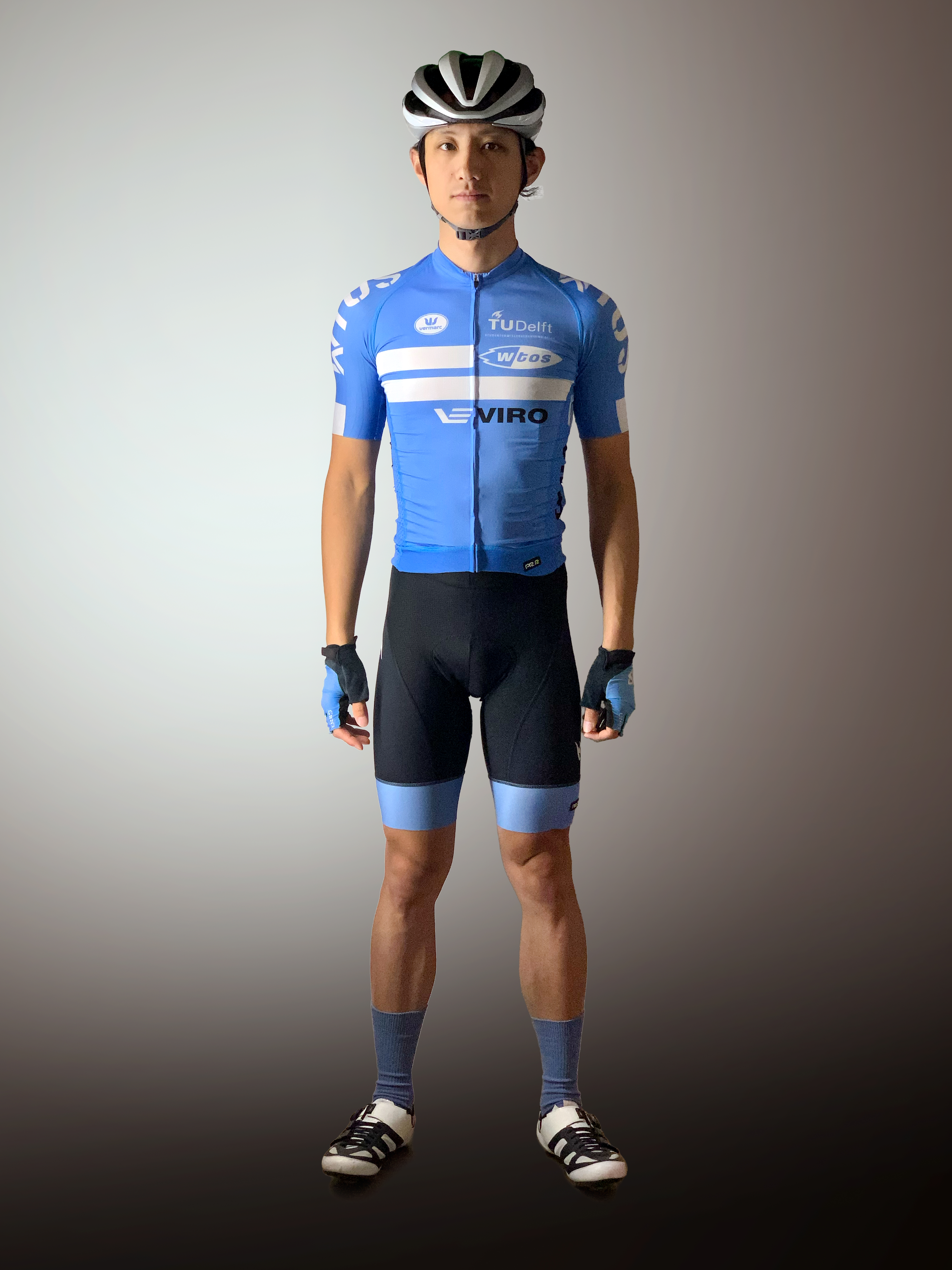
A road cyclist wearing a typical summer cycling kit.

The best athletic wear for some forms of exercise, for example cycling, is typically lightweight, stretchy and form-fitting rather than bulky, so it does not create interference with the activity.

On the other hand, sportswear should be loose enough to restrict movement. Some sports have specific uniform requirements, for example the keikogi used in karate. Various physically dangerous sports require protective gear, e.g. for fencing, American football, or ice hockey.

Standardized sportswear may also function as a uniform. In team sports, such as baseball, football or basketball, the opposing teams are usually identified by the wearing the same color of clothing. Individual team members can be recognized by a back number on a shirt.

In some sports, specific items of clothing are worn to differentiate roles within a team. For example, in volleyball, the libero (a specialist in defensive play) wears a different colour to that of their teammates. In sports such as soccer and GAA codes, a contrasting colour or pattern is worn by the goalkeeper. In other sports, clothing may indicate the current status or past achievements of a participant. In cycling disciplines, the rainbow jersey indicates the current world champion, and in major road cycling races, jerseys of particular colours are worn by the race leader and leaders of auxiliary classifications.

Spandex is the preferred material for form-fitting sportswear, such as used in wrestling, track & field, dance, gymnastics, speed skating, and swimming.

Sportswear is commonly used as a means for the promotion of sponsors of a sportsperson or team. In some sports, there are regulations limiting the size or design of sponsorship brand names and logos on items of clothing.

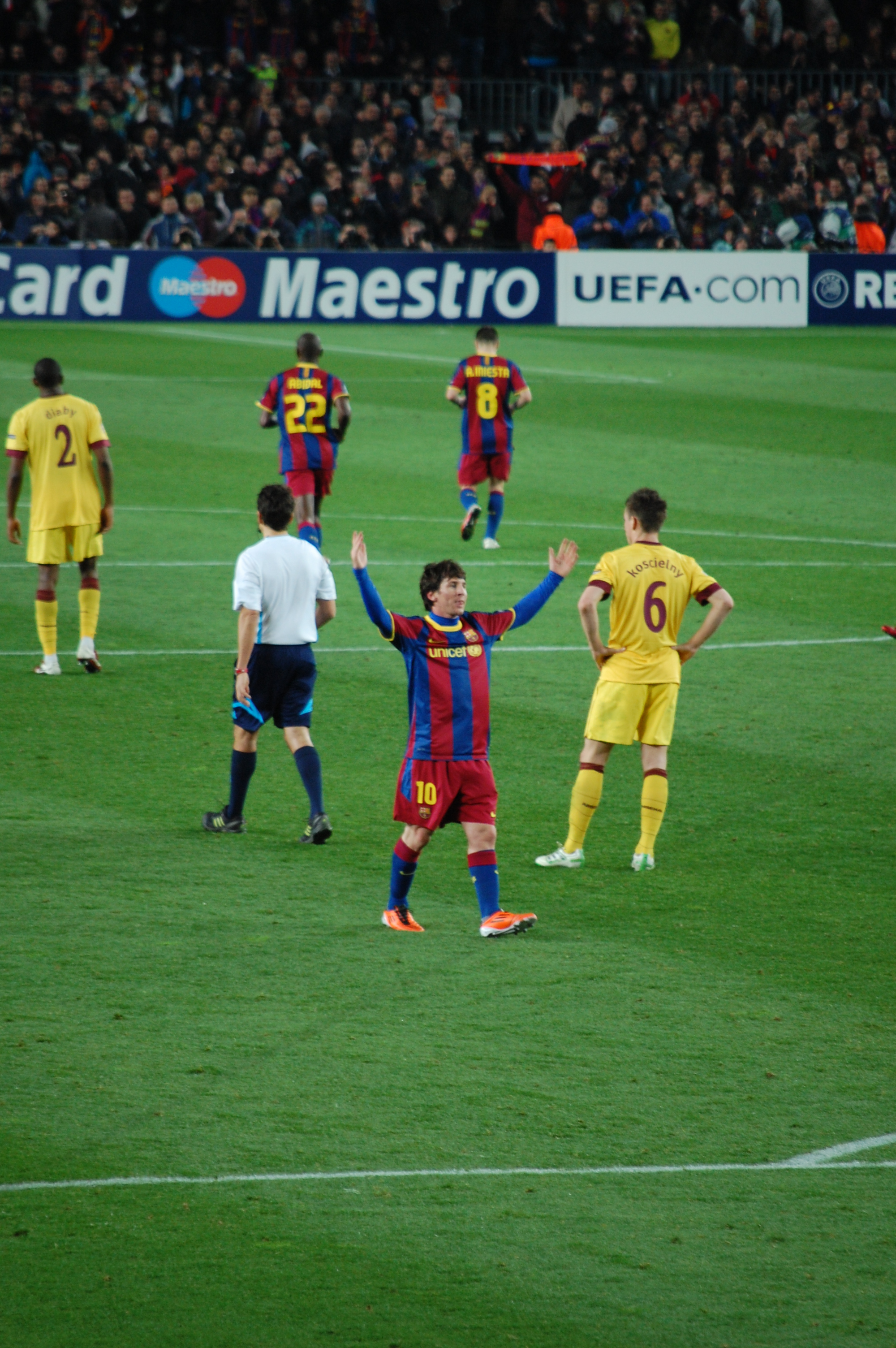
Male football players representing FC Barcelona (red and blue stripes) and Arsenal F.C. (yellow) wearing different colour outfits, while the referee is in a white T-shirt.

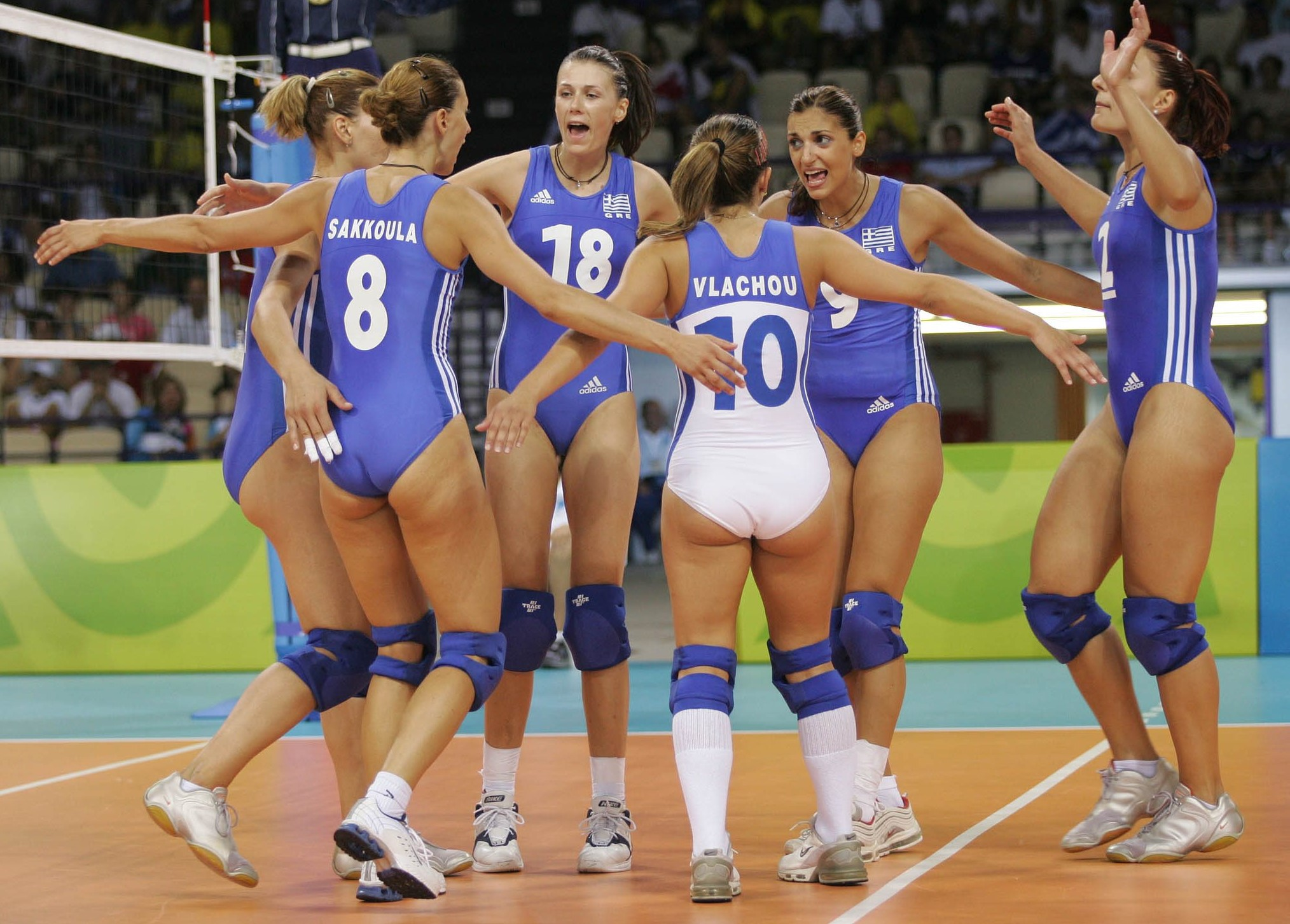
Sports uniform may not always be standardized. While generally female players of indoor volleyball wear T-shirt and shorts, in this image taken during 2004 Athens Olympics, the Greek team is wearing leotards.

=== Thermal properties ===
Sportswear design must consider the thermal insulation needs of the wearer. In hot situations, sportswear should allow the wearer to stay cool; while in cold situations, sportswear should help the wearer to stay warm.

Sportswear should also be able to transfer sweat away from the skin, using, for example, moisture transferring fabric. Spandex is a popular material used as base layers to soak up sweat. For example, in activities such as skiing and mountain climbing this is achieved by using layering: moisture transferring (wicking) materials are worn next to the skin, followed by an insulating layer, and then wind and water resistant shell garments.

== Protective wear ==
Sportswear also includes the variety of protective gear required for contact sports such as lacrosse, boxing and ice hockey. Different types of protective equipment are needed depending on the type of sport and position. The types of gears include the following: headgear, gum shields, shin pads, shoulder pads, and joint supports and protective gloves.

=== Headgear ===
Headgear is required for most sports with high risk of head injuries such as American football, bobsledding and cycling. Injuries related to the head have the potential to cause serious damage to the spine and may be life-threatening. Although sports like rugby and boxing do not require participants to wear head protection, trainers or referees may choose to depending on the player's history of head related injuries. Certain positions of some sports may require different type of protections. For example, goaltenders for ice hockey wear different types of face masks compared to other positions. They also have thick gloves with arm pads and shin guards to protect them from the high impact of pucks. In baseball, catchers and batters wear headgear for protection against the high velocity pitches. Headgear of different kinds must meet the standards of protection set by various organizations. Helmets for American football must be regulated by the National Football League or the National Collegiate Athletics Association. Although new rules of safe play have been in effect, players are still in danger of brain damage due to repeated blows to the head. Football players are more likely to develop brain related disorders during or after their careers compared to other sports.

=== Eye and face shields ===
Sports of all types may require eye or face protection depending on the players' need. Face masks come in different forms for different types of sports. In lacrosse and American football, the masks are metal rods attached to the helmet to cover the face. While optional, face masks that might be seen in basketball or rugby are plastic masks that are usually molded to fit the players' face. Such masks are worn to minimize additional damage to an already injured part of the face.

Eye protection is an additional support provided by sports goggles. Goggles may be worn in lieu of glasses or contacts. Goggles are reliable in the fact that they do not move around while the player is in motion and they protect the eye from foreign objects. For swimmers and divers, goggles keep the water away from their eyes, thus improving visibility.

=== Mouth guards ===
Mouth guards are used in many sports including but not limited to: rugby, lacrosse, water polo, ice hockey, American football, basketball, field hockey, and various martial arts. Mouth guards reduce the risk of sport related dental injuries. Contact or some team sports have a risk of causing injuries related with the mouth, jaw, teeth and oral soft tissues. Wearing mouth guards may be recommended to sports players in some sports.

Protective wear

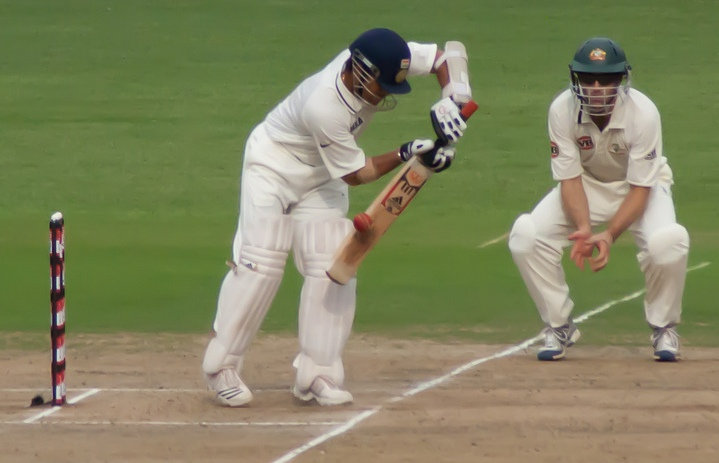
Sachin Tendulkar wearing pads to protect his legs. Both he and the short leg fielder wear cricket helmets for protection.

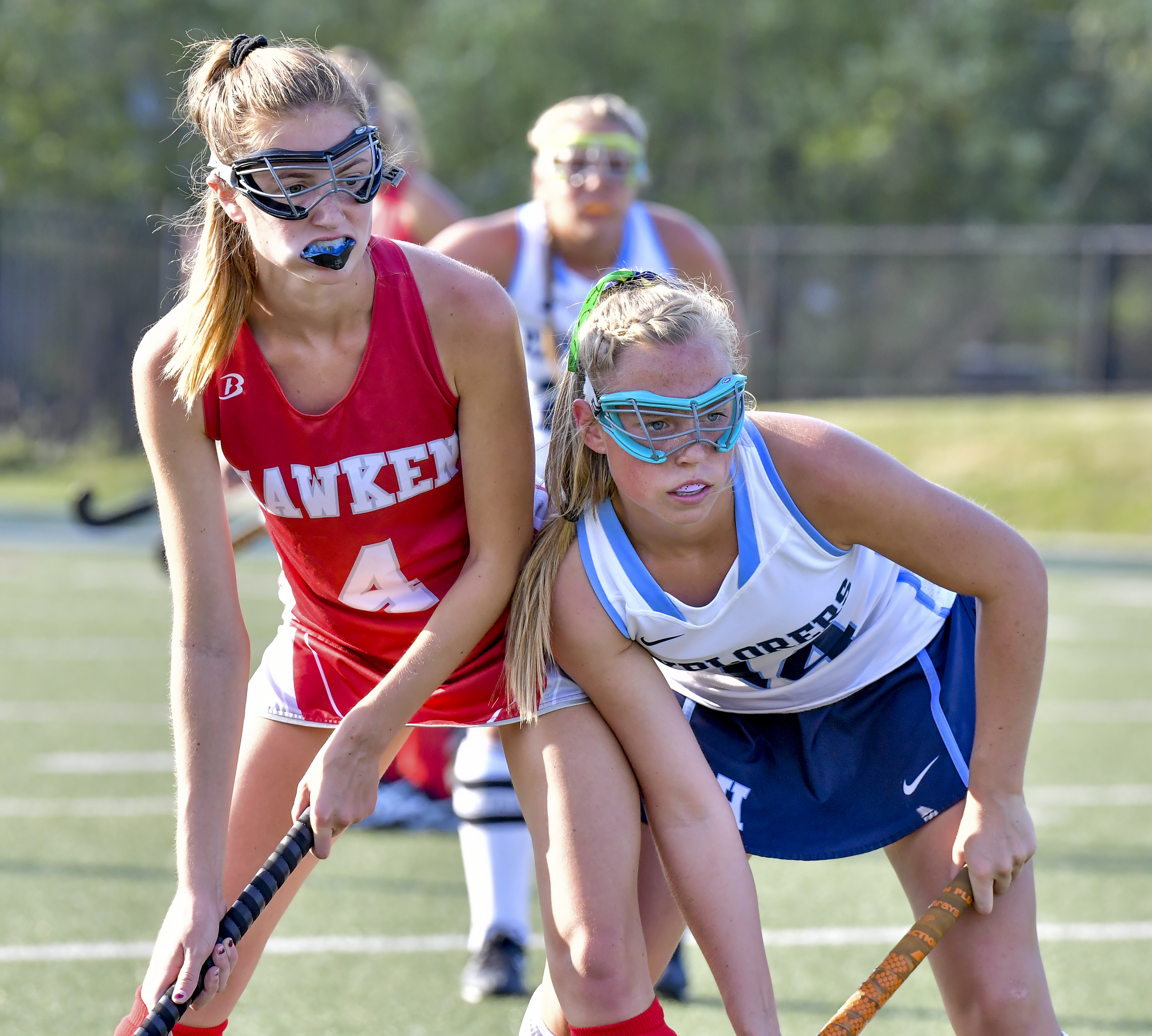
Field hockey players representing Hawken School (left) and Hudson High School (Ohio) (right) wearing protective goggles and mouthguard

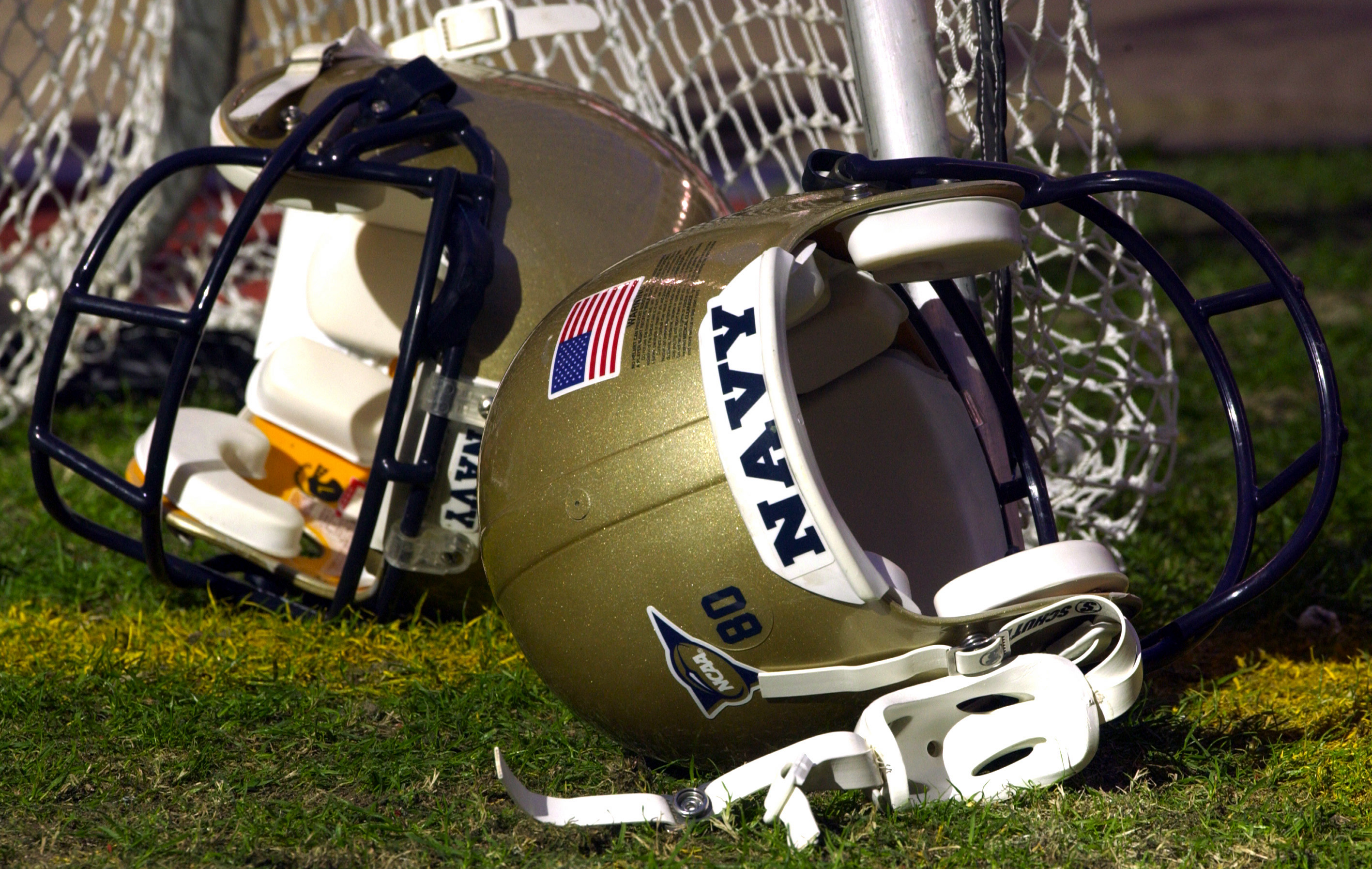
U.S. Navy football helmets

== Sales trends for activewear ==
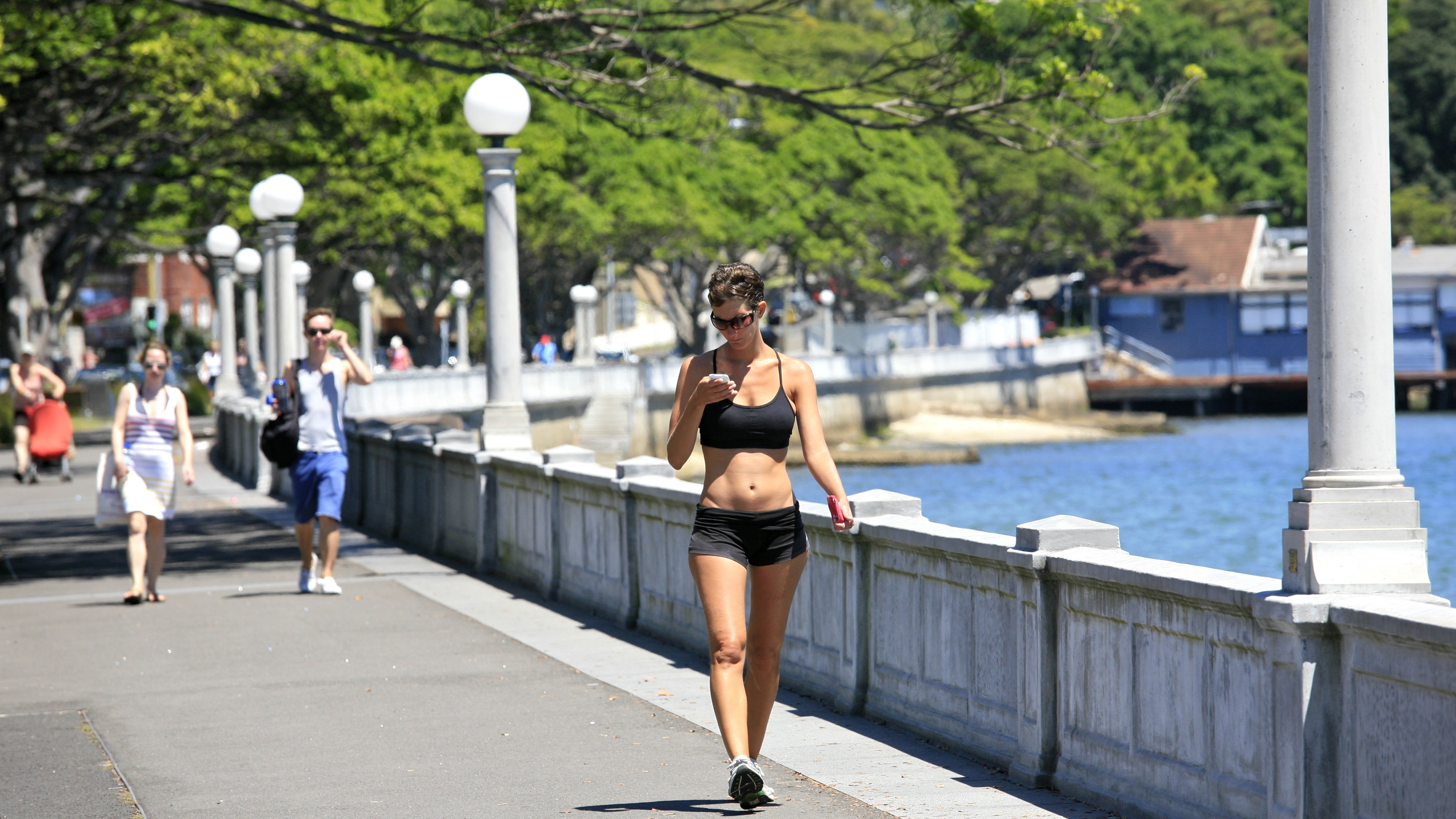
A woman wearing sports bra and boyshorts, which were conventionally women's sportswear but are now also worn as casuals or athleisure by them in the West.

As activewear becomes more fashionable and more popular with consumers, sales have increased. Activewear market was valued at $351,164 million in 2017, and is projected to hit $546,802 million by 2024, at a CAGR of 6.5% from 2018 to 2024. North America dominated the global activewear market in 2017, accounting for 42.3% of the total revenue.

Some analysts attribute the growth in sales to an intrinsic change in the way activewear is designed. "Historically, what had been available to women were items based on a men's item that were just made smaller and turned a flattering color like pink," said Scott Key, senior vice president and general manager of Athleta. "Women athletes expected more." Designers have recognized this "crossover" between exercise and fashion as a major opportunity for growth. It also synchronises with anoverall trend in American fashion towards a more casual style of dress. The trend has been so popular that it has spawned a new category of casual clothing, athleisure.

== Gender difference ==
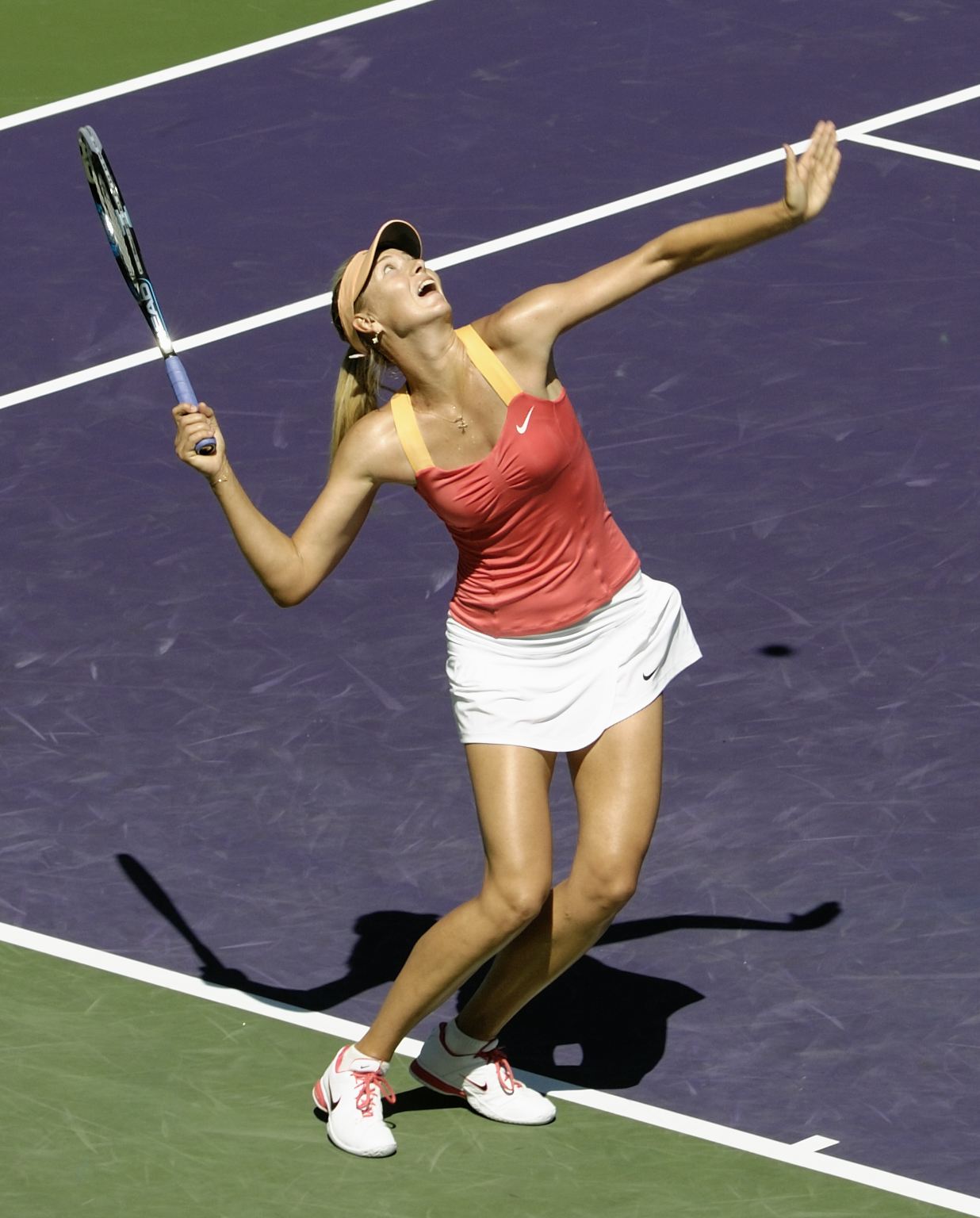
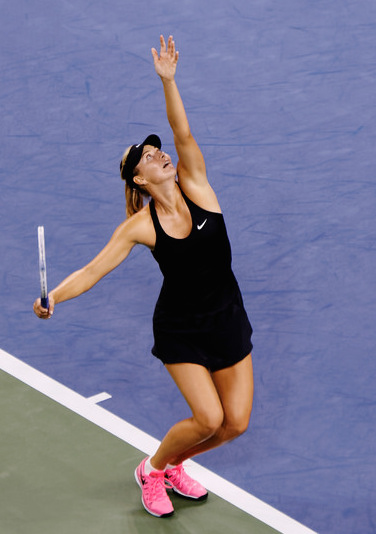
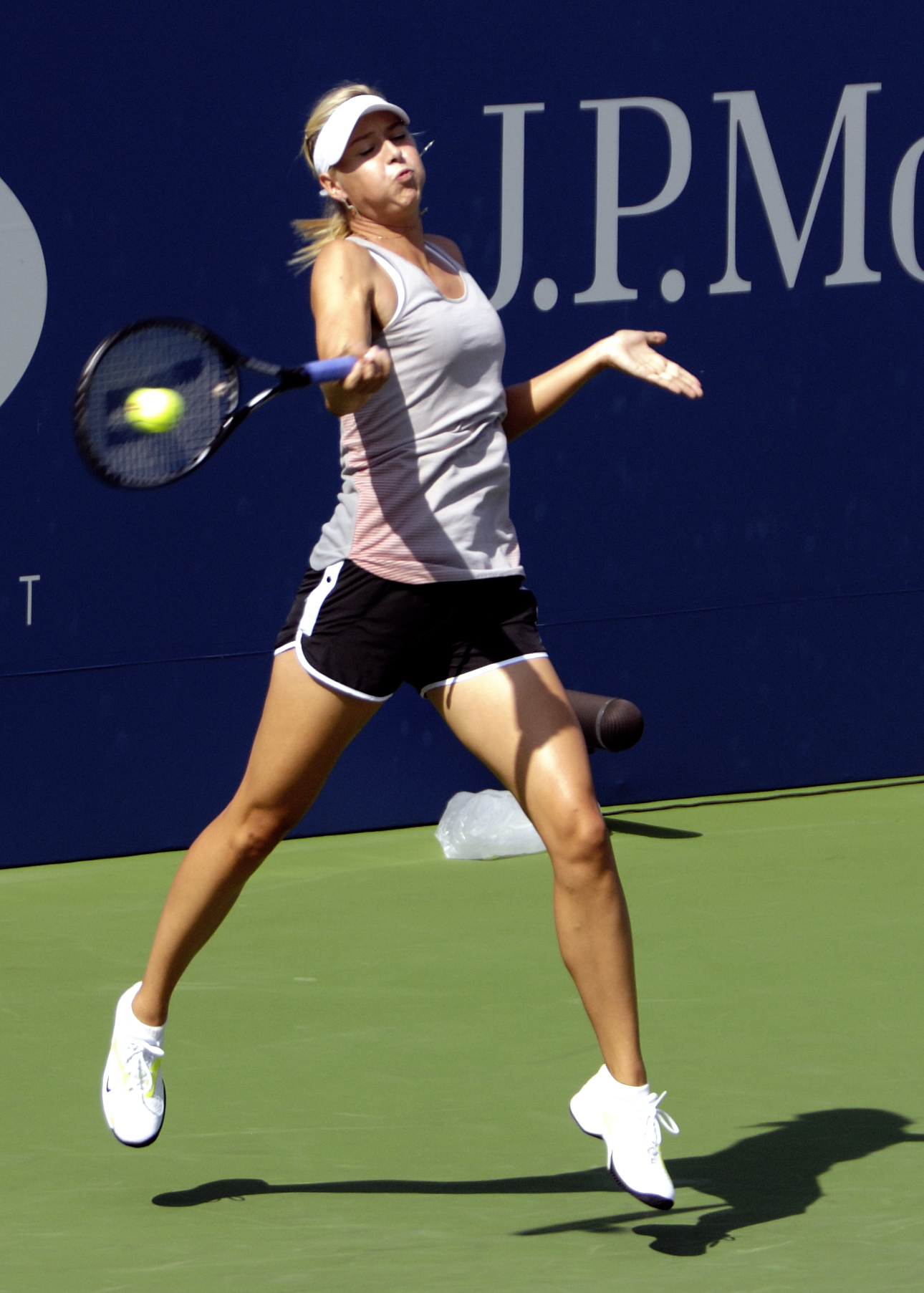
Tennis player Maria Sharapova in different types of women's clothing- miniskirt (left), minidress (centre) and shorts (right).

In sports such as tennis, while men generally wear shorts (along with T-shirt or sleeveless shirt), in case of women there is an option of wearing miniskirt, skort or shorts (along with top), as well as minidress (which is a single clothing combining miniskirt and top).

Some men are known to weightlift in jeans. According to Mia Erickson, "In a world where even the most amateur of exercise enthusiasts have access to the most elite (and affordable) workout wear, denim is rapidly gaining popularity in gyms around the world, endorsed by countless celebrities too." Notable celebrities who have popularised training in jeans include Lenny Kravitz and Robert F. Kennedy Jr. Similarly, according to Erickson, "a new breed of denim-clad fitness influencers has emerged online", which include the world record holder for pull-ups, Truett Hanes (known for running marathons under 2 hrs 40 minutes wearing jeans), and boxy strong grip specialist Daniel Strauss.

== Specific sports ==
=== Golf attire ===
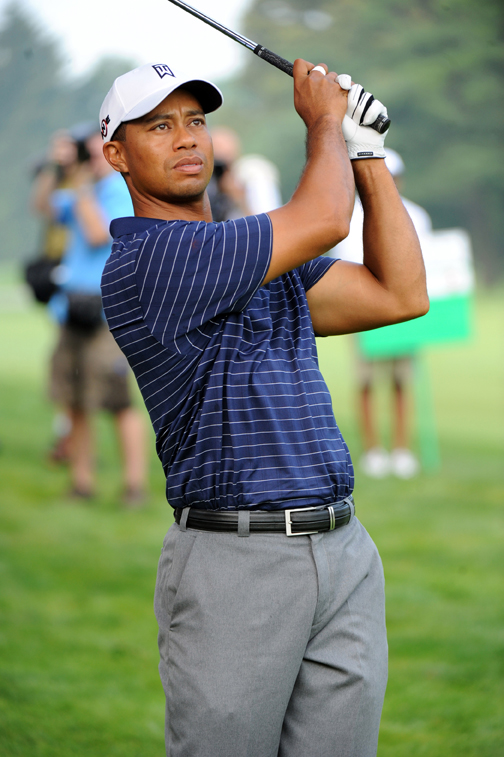
Golfer Tiger Woods in traditional men's attire

Golf has a long tradition of specialized attire that reflects the clothing of Scottish aristocrats taking in fresh air while walking around the golf course. Golf attire is also being influenced by modern fabrics and trends that stress function and durability. Golfers, like athletes in other sports, are athletes first, and public figures second. Athletes in all sports, including golf, are showing a preference for more freeing and absorbent clothes.

=== Snow gear and ski apparel ===
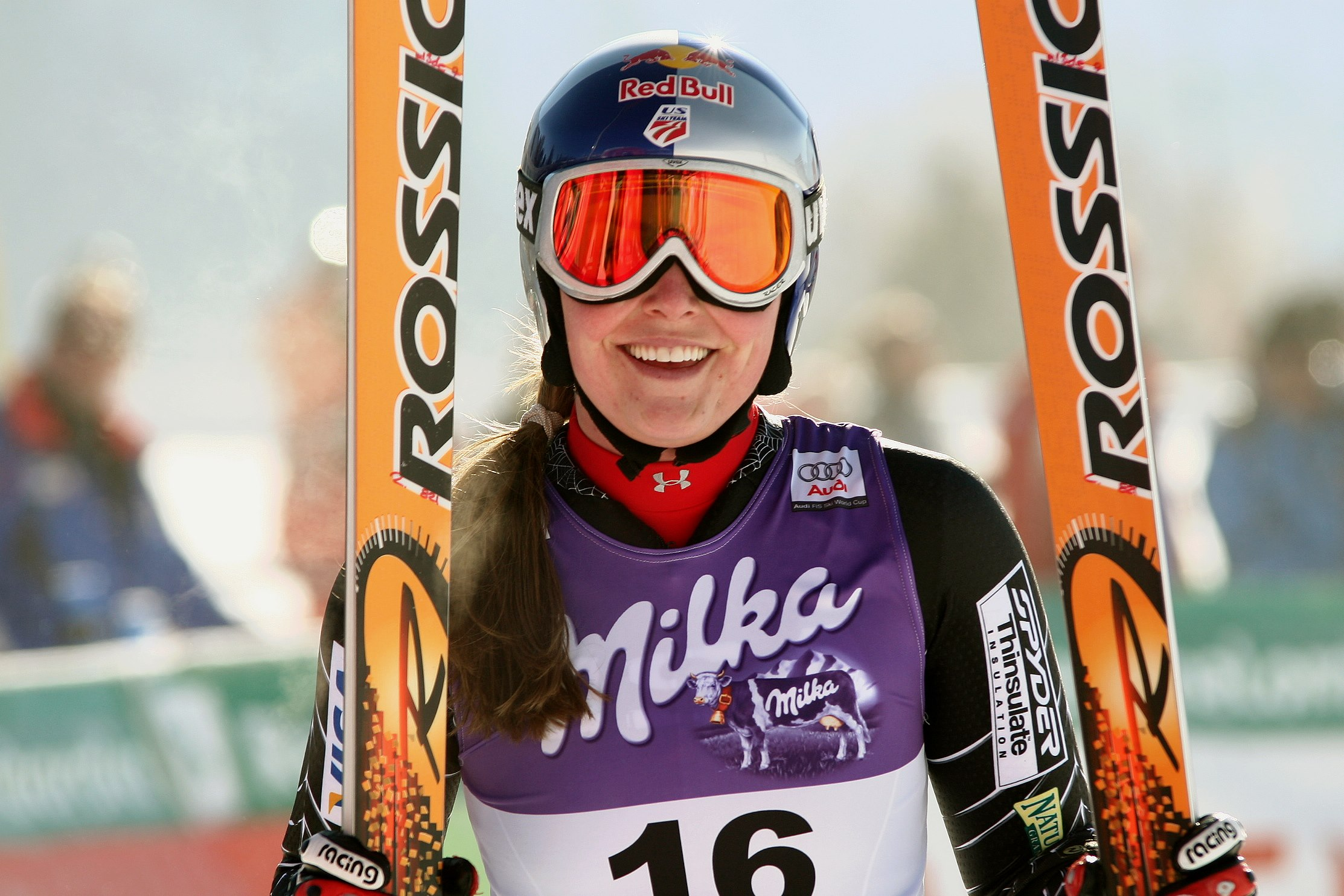
Professional USA ski racer Lindsey Vonn dressed for a race.

Different types of attire are needed for extreme weather conditions like snow. Thicker coats or jackets, gloves and boots are necessities in the cold. Winter sports such as snowboarding and skiing require the riders and skiers to be properly geared in the snow. Snow jackets differ from casual coats such that they may be packed with extra insulation and thicker coating materials. The insulation is usually made with down, which is the layer of fine feathers from geese or ducks. These feathers are naturally insulated to keep the birds warm in the harsh winter weathers. The feathers trap air inside and keep the body heat from flowing out. Down is also considered to be the highest quality of insulation for jackets. It is light and compressible. Alternative types of insulation are being invented including: synthetic microfibers and polyester-based insulation. These materials perform as well as down if not better and are becoming popular in the markets with the help of major brands using such materials for their equipment.

Winter gear must also be flexible so that it may offer a wide range of movement. An ideal jacket would have enough insulation to be warm but light, it should be made with material that are not restricting. Jackets with down will be light and warm but they tend to be more expensive. Also down jackets usually are not water-resistant. Synthetic insulated jackets, however, are water-resistant and cheaper than down but lose their insulating factors and are heavier.

== See also ==
- Athleisure
- Athletic shoes
- Bikini as sportwear
- Compression garment
- Exercise dress
- Fitness culture
- Layered clothing
- Leotard
- Performance fabrics
- Swimsuit
- Tracksuit
