= Tracksuit =

Trousers and jacket originally for athletes

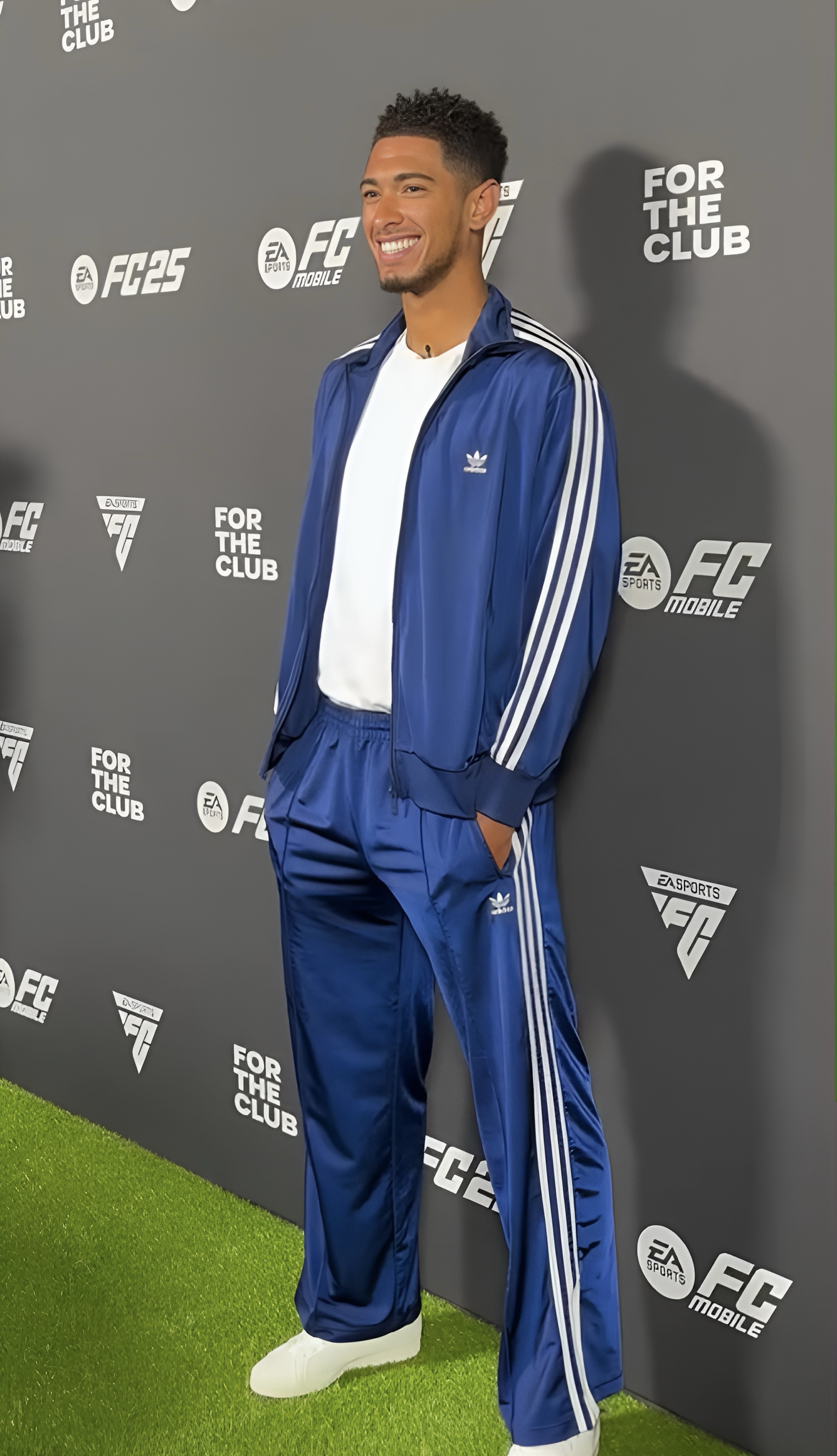
English footballer Jude Bellingham wearing a tracksuit at an EA Sports event in 2024

A tracksuit is an article of clothing consisting of two parts: trousers and a jacket usually with a front zipper. Also known as sweatsuits or trackies, tracksuits are designed to keep the body warm during and after athletic activity. It was originally intended for use in sports, mainly for athletes to wear over competition clothing (such as running shirt and shorts or a swimsuit) and to take off before competition. In modern times, it has become commonly worn in other contexts, especially athleisure. The tracksuit was one of the earliest uses of synthetic fibers in sportswear.

Most tracksuits have a mesh interior which allows the user to wear them without any undergarment such as underwear. This is much like a bathing suit. Many people wear it for physical exercise sessions. A sauna suit is a specialized form of tracksuit made of a waterproof fabric such as coated nylon or PVC that is designed to make the wearer sweat profusely. Sauna suits are primarily used for temporary weight loss.

== Other names ==
The tracksuit is also known as a warm-up suit, or "warmups" for short, as they are intended for athletes to keep their bodies warm before or after competition, and during breaks (especially important in cold weather). In almost all cases, sports teams will wear these garments using a fabric that matches their official team, school, or country colors. The bottoms of tracksuits are also known as sweatpants.

== Fashion history ==
Sweatpants were first invented by French sportswear manufacturer Le Coq Sportif in 1920 to provide athletes with comfort and ease of mobility. As sweatpants became more common, Le Coq Sportif designed the "Sunday suit" as a combination of sweatpants and a matching top, for use in home relaxation or daily exercise.

Tracksuits would become popular casualwear in 1967 when Adidas created their first piece of apparel and marketed it in collaboration with German footballer Franz Beckenbauer. The Beckenbauer Adidas collection was followed by instances of depictions of tracksuits in pop culture, such as Bruce Lee wearing tracksuits in Longstreet and Game of Death. Tracksuits were associated with the youth culture of the time, particularly hippies and university students.

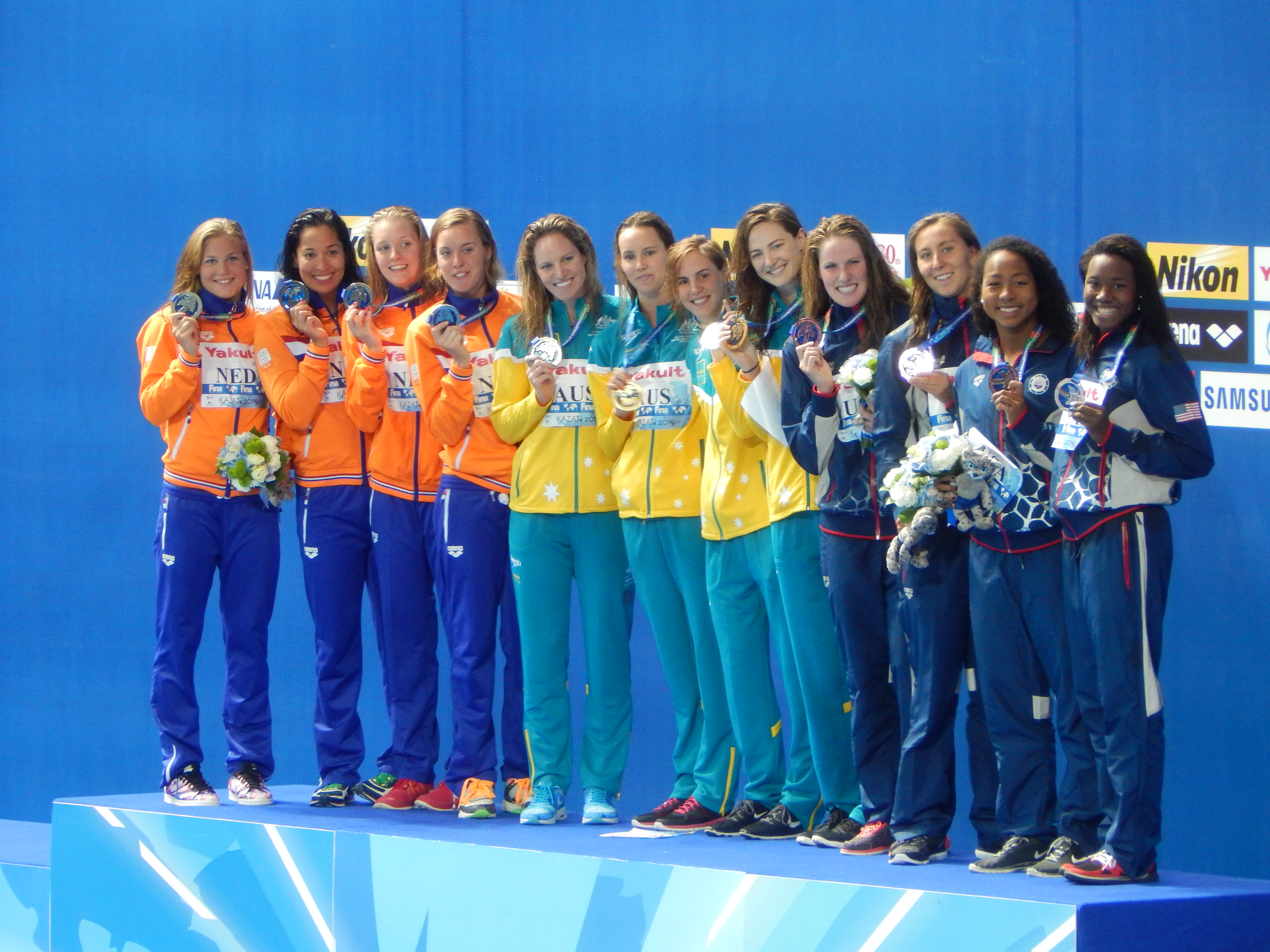
The victory ceremony of the women's 4 × 100 metres freestyle relay at the 2015 World Aquatics Championships in Kazan; winners are wearing tracksuits, 2015.

Tracksuits at the time were made out of cotton, polyester, terry cloth, or a mix. In the late 1970s velour became popular, so much so that it became the most used form of fabric on a tracksuit.

Hip-hop culture would also contribute to the tracksuit's mainstream success. In 1986, Run DMC released the song My Adidas, with a music video featuring the group prominently wearing Adidas tracksuits, further associating tracksuits with hip-hop.

The trend of wearing athletic clothing continued into the early 1980s. Tracksuits were eventually replaced by shellsuits, which were made out of nylon, in the late 1980s. This trend was short-lived, lasting only a few years.

In the United Kingdom, tracksuits became popular due to Tommie Smith and John Carlos' black power salute during the 1968 Olympics and Bob Marley's Jamaican tracksuit. Young white working-class men in the UK often wore tracksuits to football games during the 1980s and the clothing was associated with football hooliganism at the time.

A descendant of the tracksuit, the shell suit, which arrived in the late 1980s, became popular with the hip-hop and breakdancing scene of the era. They were manufactured from a mix of cellulose triacetate and polyester making them shiny on the outside, with distinctive combinations of colours.

In the late 1990s, tracksuits made a comeback in mainstream fashion for both men and women. They returned to the fabrics of the 1970s, most notably polyester. The trend continued into the 2000s, when velour made a comeback, by the likes of Juicy Couture and other brands. This continued for most of the decade. Tracksuits briefly went out of fashion in the late 2000s, resurfacing in the 2010s with "athleisure" trends.

Beginning in the early-2000s, tracksuits have been associated with grime music in the UK and its related culture. This has led to the style of clothing being associated in the mainstream media with the country's gang culture, however grime musicians such as Stormzy have openly disassociated from them.

Since 2006, prominent fashion designers have been asked to design tracksuits for the athletes of various Olympic teams, usually all the athletes representing one country. For example, designer Ralph Lauren created the USA uniforms for the 2010 Winter Olympic Games opening ceremony. The sportswear company Adidas hired Stella McCartney to be the Creative Director for the 2012 GB Olympic Games (by Adidas)—the first time in the history of the games that a leading fashion designer has designed the apparel for a particular country’s team across all competitions for both the Olympic and the Paralympic Games.

== Gallery ==
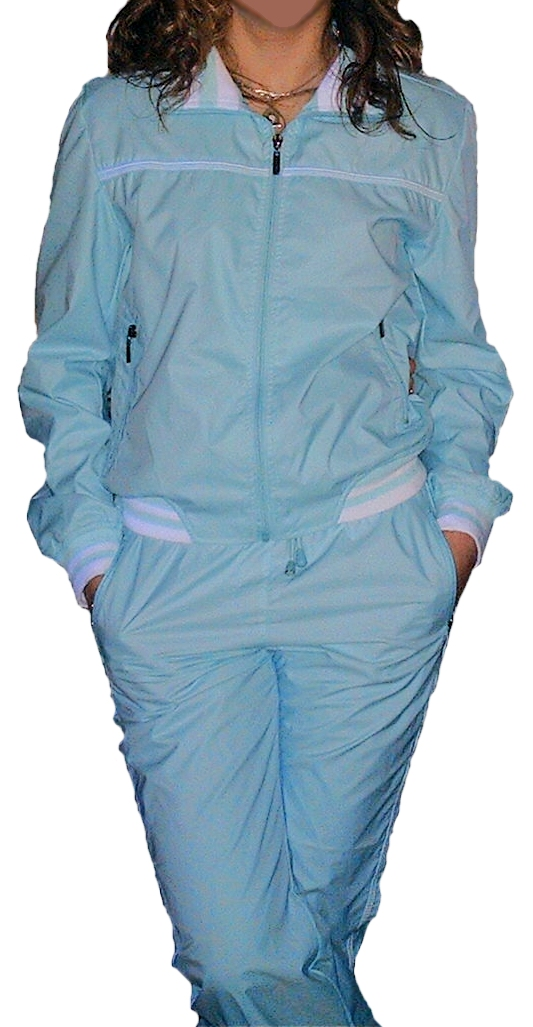
An example of a tracksuit used as fashionable casual wear

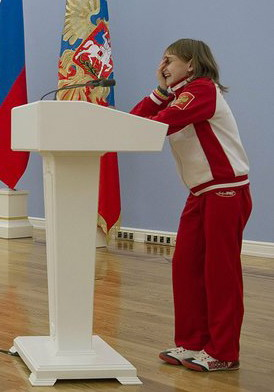
Russian gymnast Viktoria Komova wearing a tracksuit

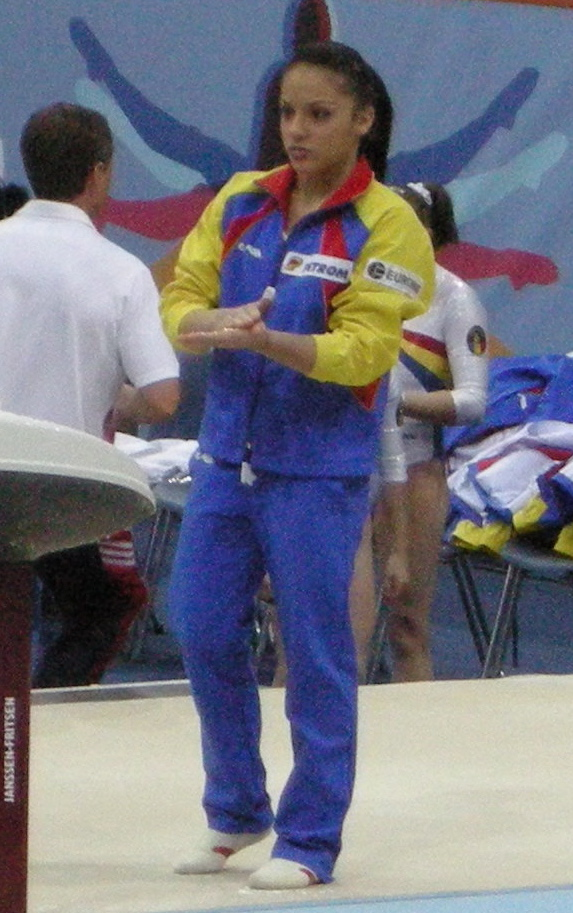
Cerasela Patrascu, during 2010 World Artistic Gymnastics Championships, wears the Romanian flag colours on her tracksuit.

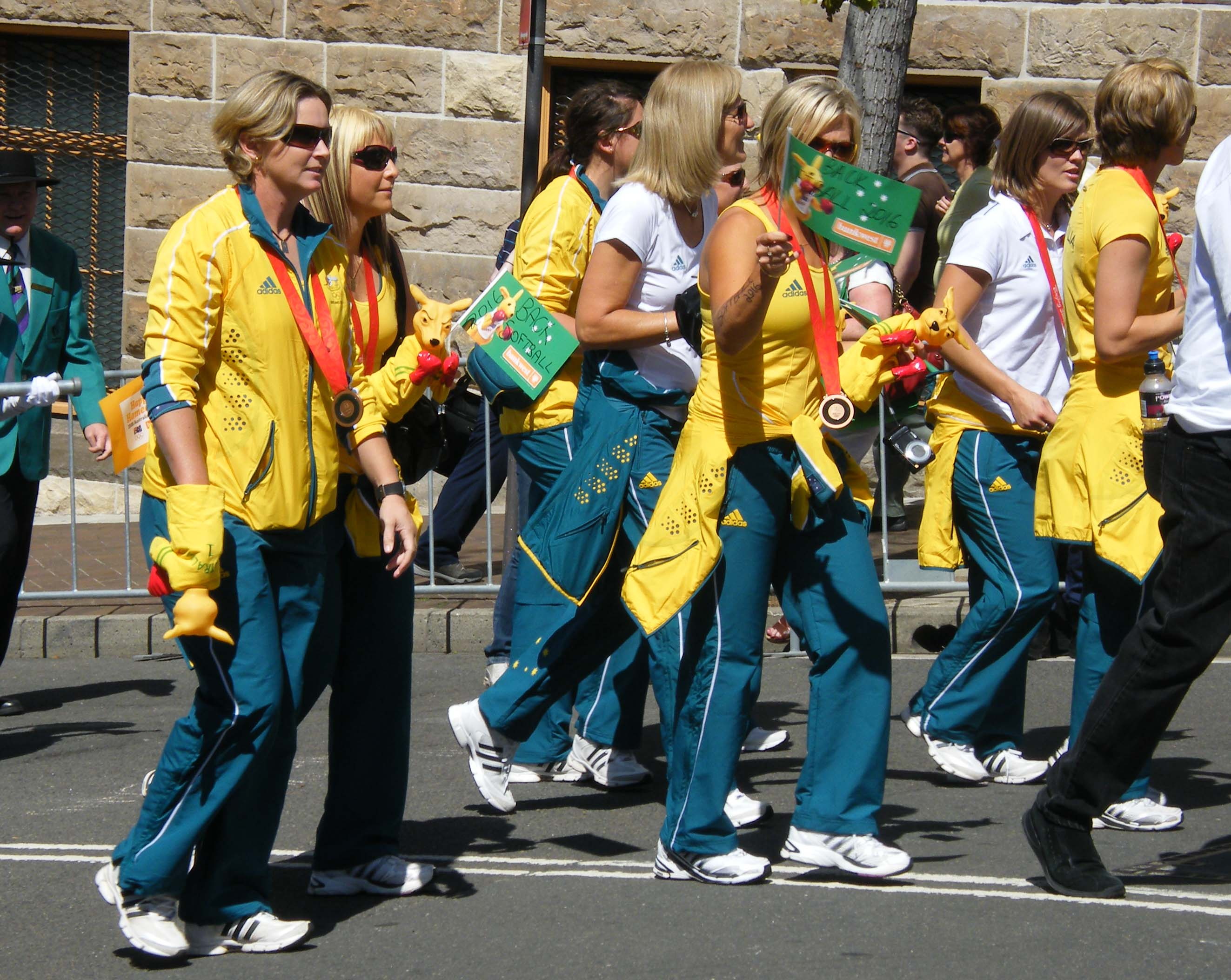
The Australian Olympic women's softball team at a welcome-home parade in Sydney, 2008

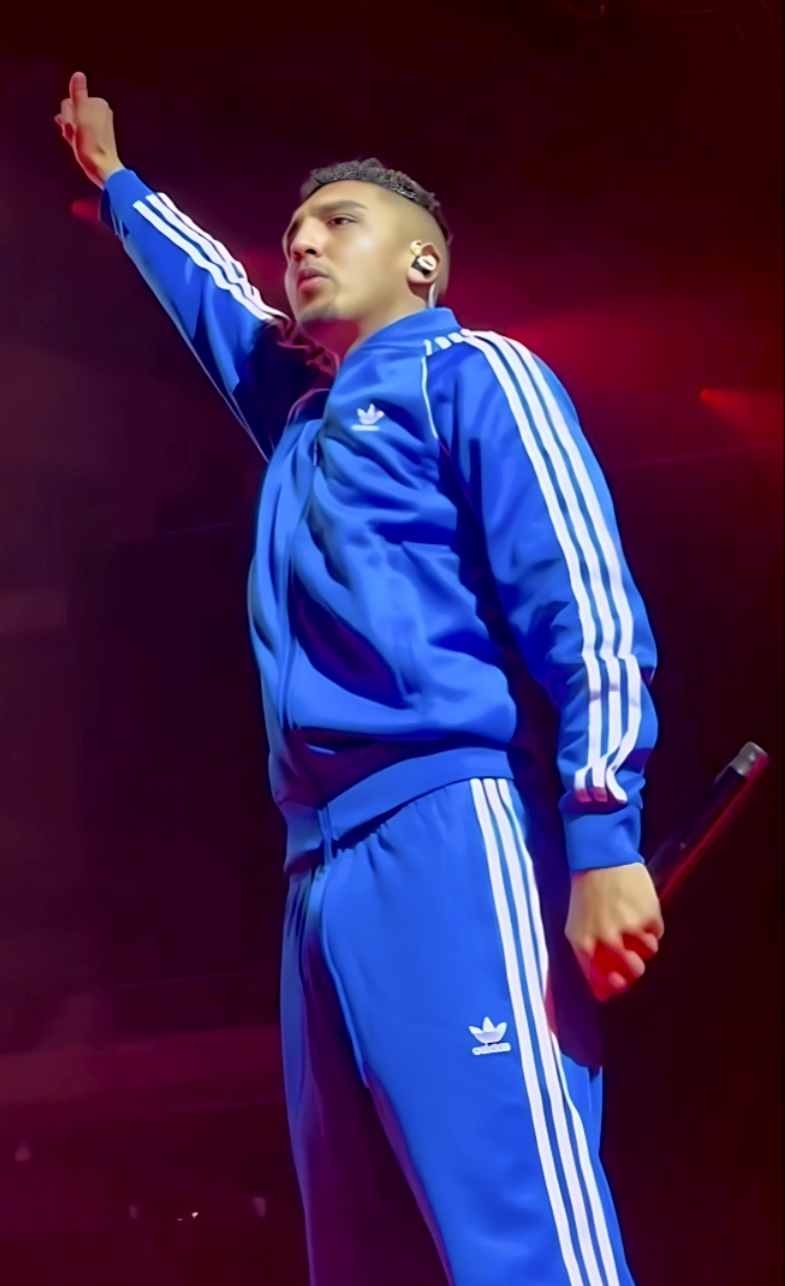
Spanish rapper Morad wearing a tracksuit during a concert

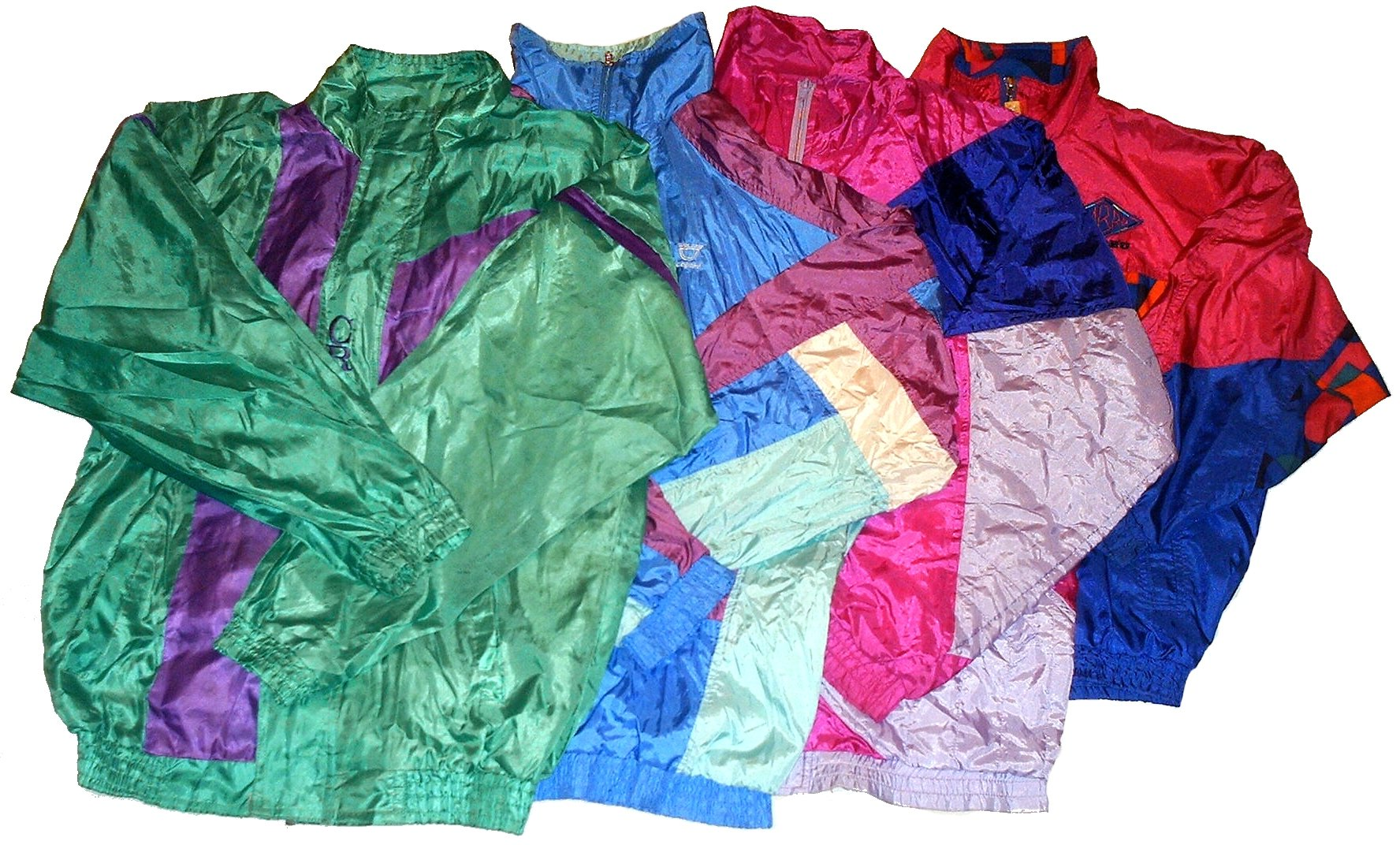
Shell suit jackets made of colorful nylon fabric

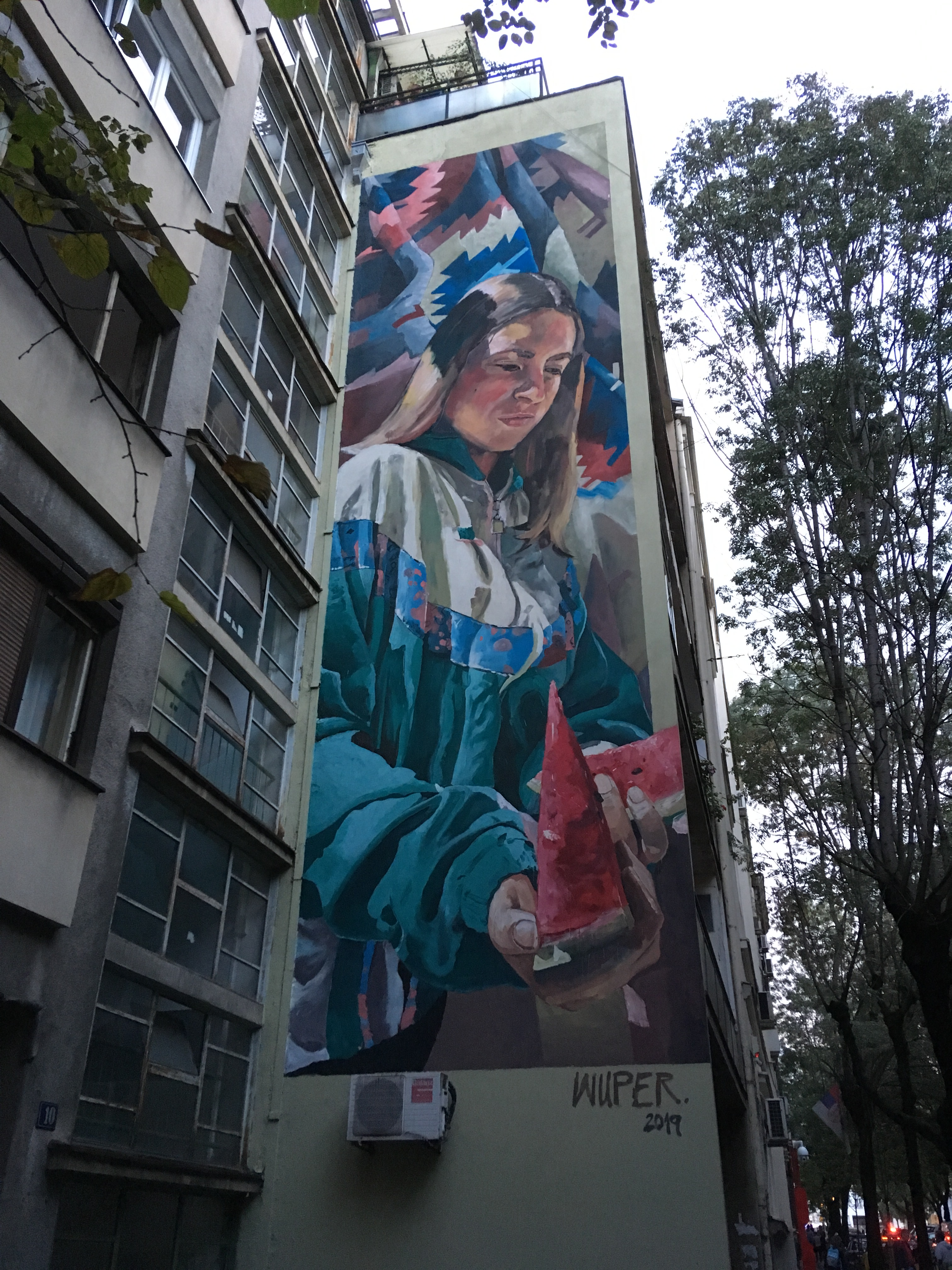
A mural with a girl dressed in tracksuit

== See also ==
- Athleisure
