= Athleisure =

Fashion trend

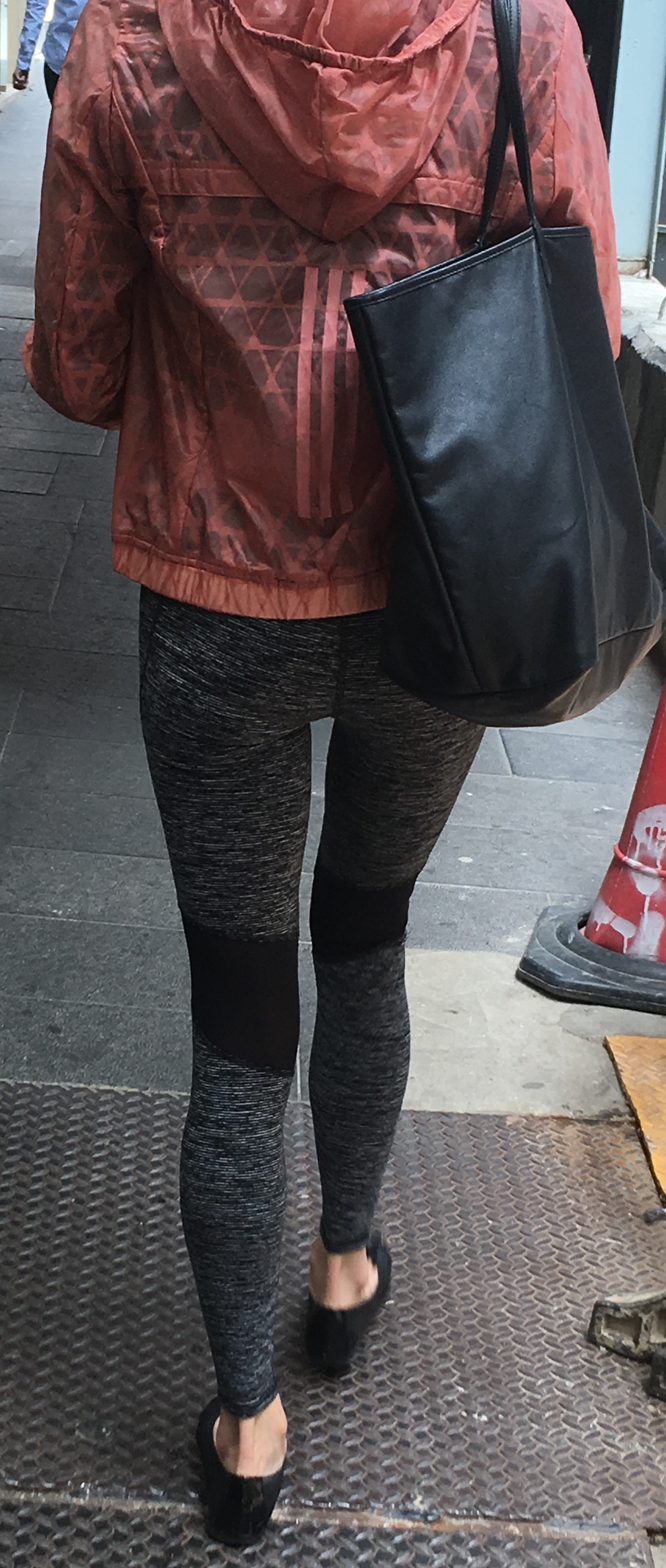
Windbreakers and leggings are athleisure fashion trends.

Athleisure is a hybrid style of athletic clothing typically worn as everyday wear. The word is a portmanteau combining the words "athletic" and "leisure". Athleisure outfits can include tracksuits, sports jackets, hoodies, yoga pants, tights, sneakers, flats, Birkenstocks, uggs, leggings and shorts that look like athletic wear or pair well with it. Characterized as "fashionable, dressed-up sweats and exercise clothing", athleisure grew during the mid-2010s, from the popularity of yoga pants that emerged throughout the mid to late 2000s. The athleisure trend entails casual clothing options that give women the option to incorporate athletic clothing as part of their everyday attire, irrespective of their actual engagement in physical activities.

Athleisure is a contemporary fashion industry movement, enabled by scientific development and growth of advanced and cutting-edge textile materials and technical fabrics and fibers which allow modern activewear to be more durable, breathable, lightweight, stretchy, versatile, comfortable, and fashionable. Since the mid-2010s, it is also recognized as a retail clothing category.

== Background ==
In the 1930s, the American sportswear company Champion began producing hoodies for American working-class laborers working in freezing temperatures. In 1958, the American chemical maker DuPont invented spandex, a crucial material component foundational in many pieces of contemporary athleisure. The German sportswear company Adidas popularized athletic fashion by introducing sport-to-street tracksuits in 1963. By the 1970s, athletic fashion was ubiquitous throughout North American street culture which grew in popularity throughout the 1980s from old school hip hop music videos.

One account suggests that the cyclical nature of blue jean sales has allowed athleisure apparel to supplant denim as casual wear. Activewear that had been worn exclusively in gyms is now being casually worn elsewhere by young adults and fitness-conscious consumers and has been accompanied by a relaxation in dress codes. The styles, colors, and fabrics of athleisure postulate a broader emphasis on being fashionable as opposed to functionality. Technological advances in textiles innovation have brought improvements in functionality, such that modern garments and footwear have become more breathable, lightweight, stretchy, versatile, comfortable, fashionable, durable, and waterproof. Contemporary garments are performance enhancing and allow wearers to carry out everyday activities easily.

=== Evolution in the 2020s ===
By 2020, a so-called "next-gen athleisure" category had emerged, owing to increasing acceptance in the workplace as well as advancements in fabric and production technology, which has led yoga pants to also function as an acceptable form of officewear. The COVID-19 pandemic contributed to a continued increase in the popularity of athleisure wear. Some fashion brands that had previously made streetwear or suits pivoted to items like hoodies and jogging trousers, since many people were quarantined at home and wanted comfortable clothing that would still look stylish for virtual meetings.

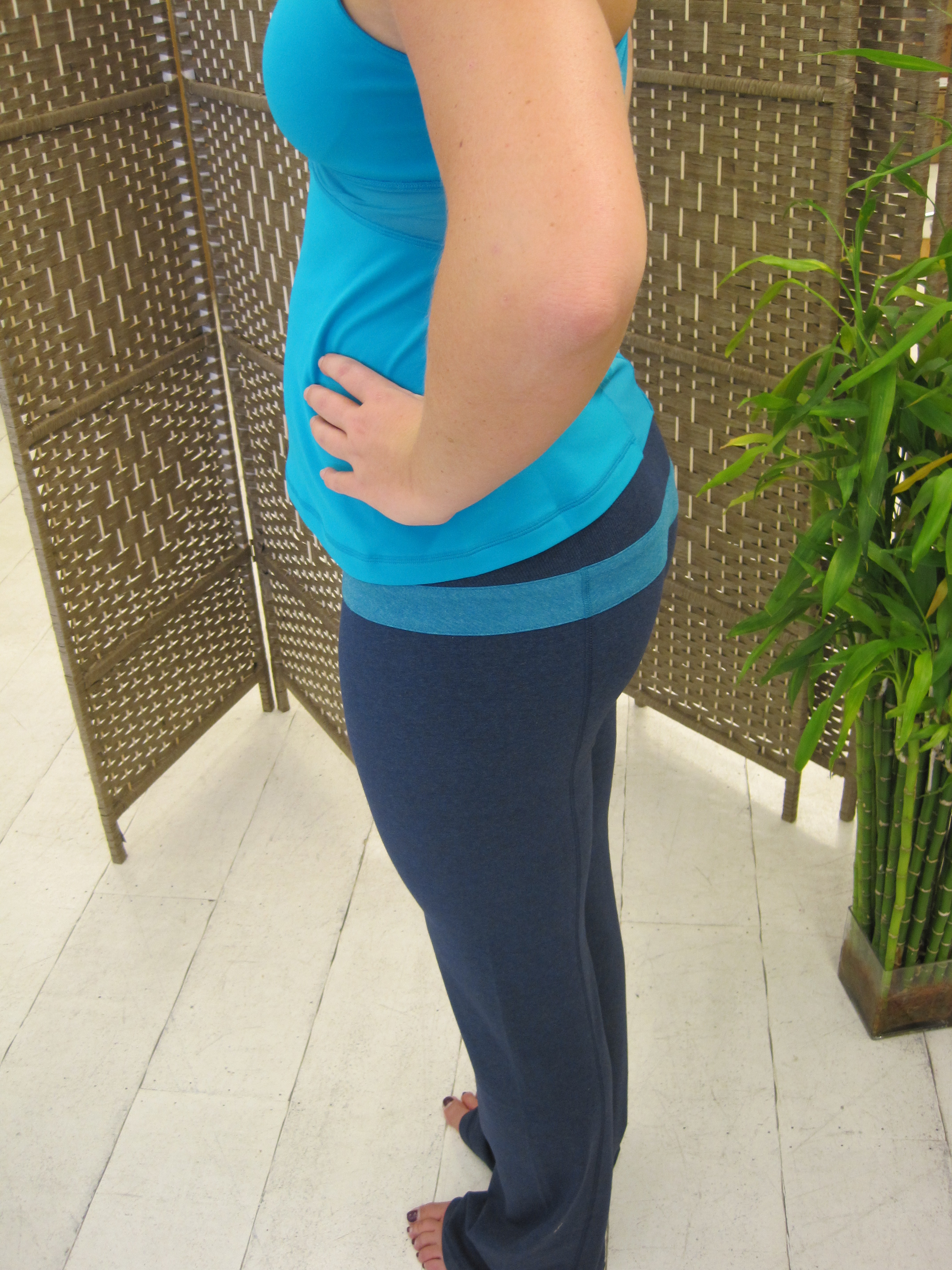
Athleisure clothing frequently uses accents of brightly-colored fabric acting as a stark contrast against a dark background, as shown here with a person wearing Lululemon's groove pants.

== Market size and trends ==
Reports in USA Today and The Wall Street Journal in 2015 described the athleisure market as growing, displacing typical workwear styles, and cutting in to sales of jeans, with a market size in 2014 of US$35 billion, representing an 8% increase from the previous year. According to one estimate, the athleisure market, including footwear, was US$270 billion in 2016, and was estimated to grow 30% in the United States and Asia by the year 2020. According to a study conducted by Allied Market Research, the worldwide athleisure market in 2018 was estimated to be valued at US$155 billion. As of 2019 in Canada, approximately 25 percent of the apparel purchased by Canadians consisted of "active" or athleisure clothing. However, by 2021, this percentage had increased to over one-third, with sales of such clothing growing at a rate twice that of other apparel categories. According to a report conducted by Market Research Future, it is projected that the market will exceed a value of US$842 billion by the year 2028.

The athleisure market has experienced a surge in competition due to the influx of big-box retailers such as Walmart and Target, as well as fast fashion brands offering similar products at more affordable prices. A market analyst estimated that the athleisure market was not slowing down, with much competition and pressure on various retail outlets including sporting goods stores.

== Impacts ==
=== Social ===
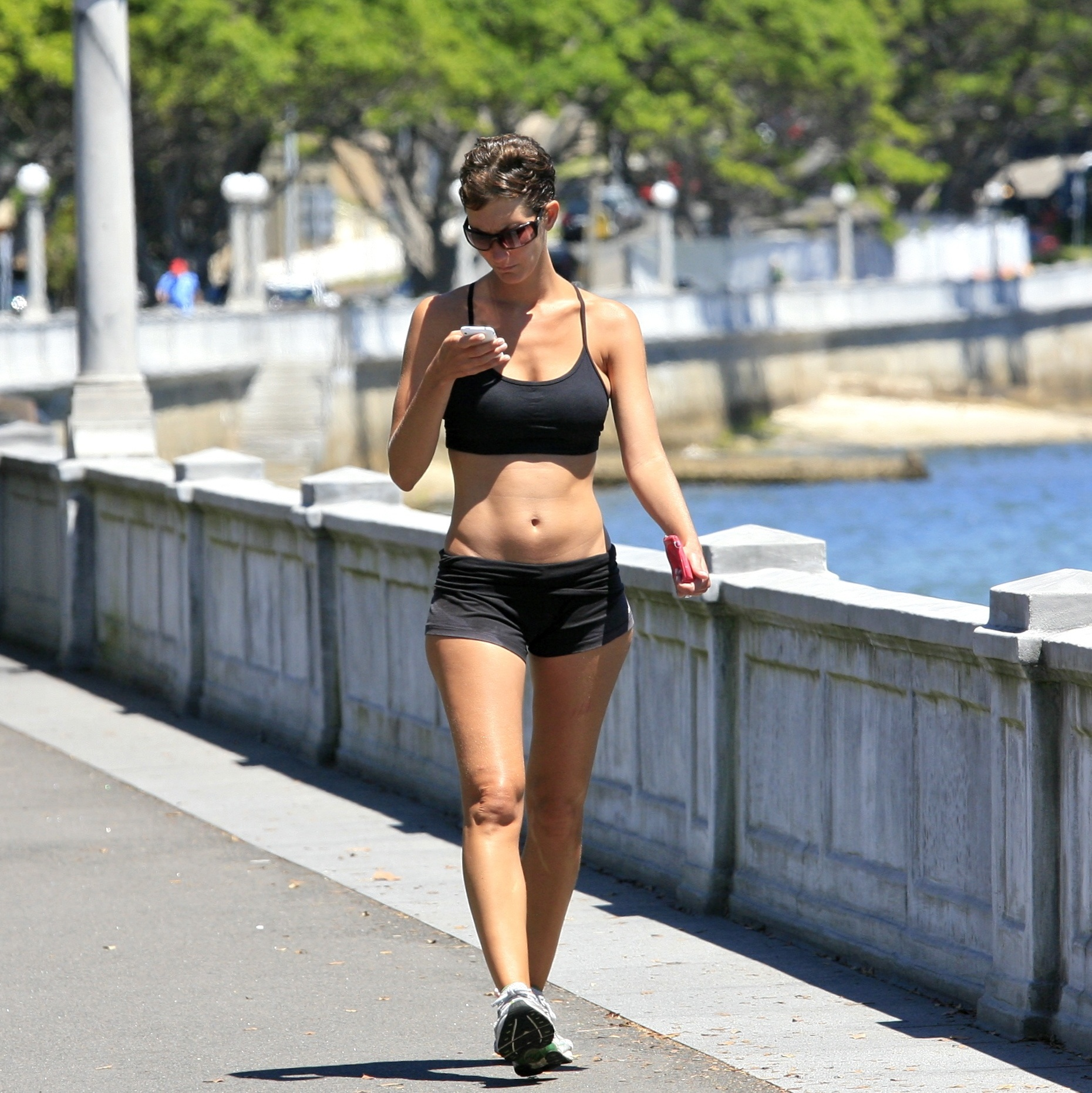
A woman wearing sports bra and boyshorts, which were conventionally women's sportswear, but are now also worn as casual or athleisure by women across North American society

Athleisure has been promoted by celebrities such as Beyoncé and Rihanna. It has been criticized because of the way it displays the feminine form. In a 2019 article in the New York Times which focused specifically on leggings, the question was asked: "When did leggings make the leap from garment to cultural lightning rod?" In a letter to the editor of The Observer, school newspaper at the University of Notre Dame, reported the Times, a woman wrote: "it was for their own as well as the greater good [for women not to wear leggings] in part because leggings made it hard for men to control themselves".

=== Materials and technology ===
Scientific advancements have led to the rise of new modern technical fibers being developed and used to make athleisure more resistant to wear and tear, water, grease, and stains as well as to enable greater odor reduction, sweat-wicking, and stretchability to conform to the human body's shape. Some athleisure designs allow certain segments more breathability while other parts can have greater tension or durability. A type of athleisure sometimes called "technical wear" focuses on clothes that are more suitable for wearing to the office while also being comfortable in concurrence.

=== Environmental ===
There have been concerns that materials used in athleisure may have negative consequences for the environment; these chemicals include dyes and solvents and polyfluorinated chemicals and petroleum which are used to make athleisure resistant to water, grease and stains.

== See also ==
- Activewear
- Exercise dress
- Fitness culture
- Gorpcore
- Sportswear
- Women's sports
