= Exercise dress =

Item of athletic wear

An exercise dress or workout dress is an item of athleisure.

== History ==
Exercise dresses were marketed by the brand Outdoor Voices in 2018 and according to the Wall Street Journal became a "viral hit". By 2020 Under Armour and Athleta were also marketing the dresses.

== Description ==
The dresses typically incorporate a bodysuit including bike shorts under a racerback A-line dress, often with a pocket in the shorts to accommodate a phone, keys, or credit card. They are constructed in some combination of nylon and spandex. Wearers step into the shorts through the neckline and pull the dress up to put it on. According to Cosmopolitan, the dresses are appropriate for general daywear and "literally no one would know you just wore it to the gym".

Exercise dresses have gained popularity in mainstream activewear, featured by lifestyle media outlets and public personalities. Lifestyle digital publications have highlighted designs from major apparel retailers, noting features such as built-in shorts, adjustable straps, and stretch fabrics designed for both athletic and casual wear.

== Response ==
Women have experienced stares and double-takes when exercising in an exercise dress.

== See also ==
- Fitness culture
- Sportswear
