= Skort =

Shorts made to look like a skirt

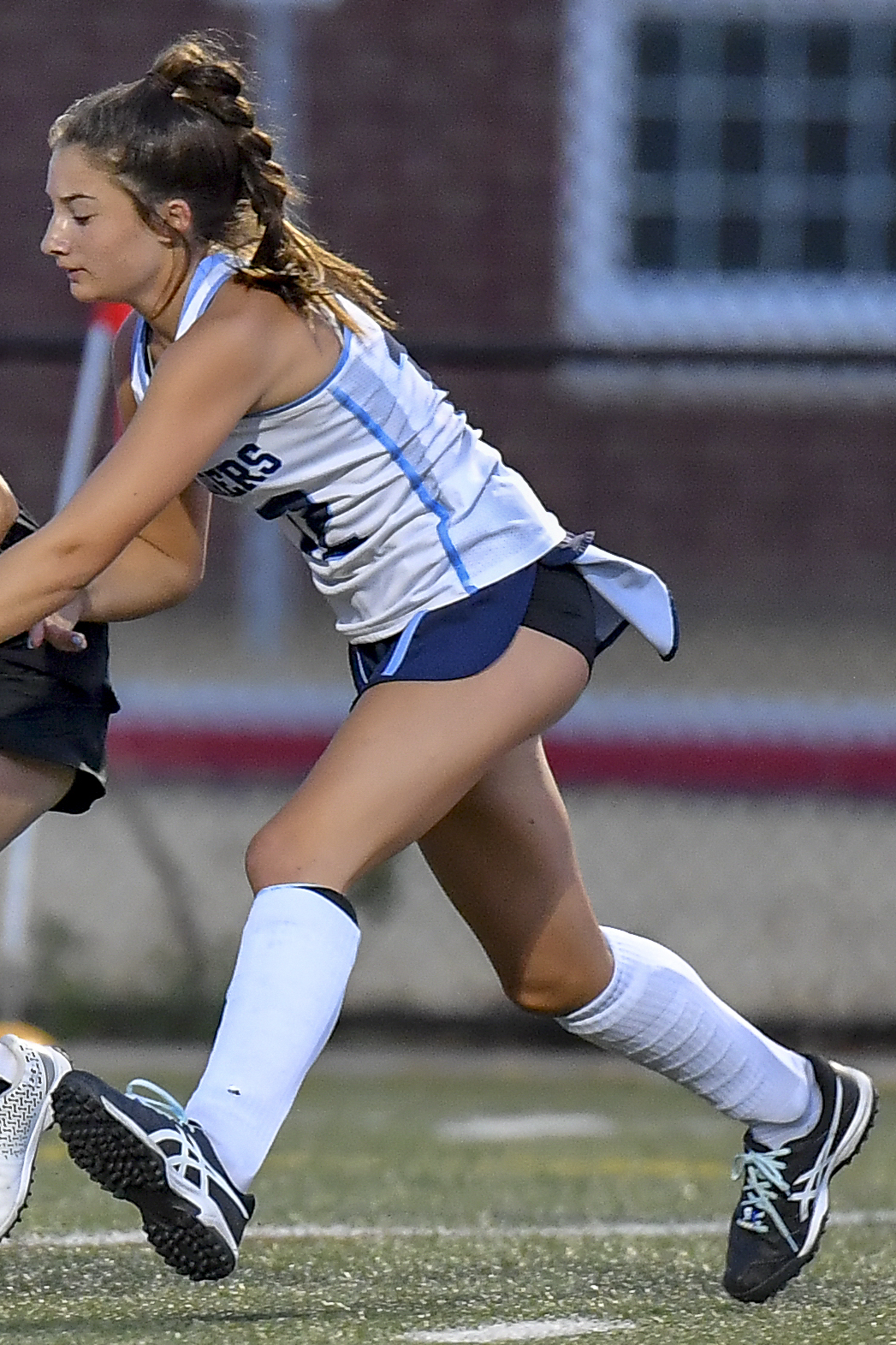
- A field hockey player wearing a pair of skorts as part of her uniform
- Type: Pair of shorts that look like a skirt, or shorts with a skirt-like panel in front and back
- Material: fabric

A skort, skorts, or pair of skorts (a blend of skirt and shorts) is a pair of shorts with an overlapping fabric panel made to resemble a skirt covering the front, or a skirt with a pair of integral shorts hidden underneath.

Initially called "trouser skirts", skorts were developed to provide more freedom to do activities (such as sports, gardening, cleaning, or bike riding), and give the appearance of a skirt. At first, skorts were not deemed appropriate to be worn during any non-athletic activity.

Montgomery Ward claimed in their 1959 Spring/Summer catalog to have invented the garment they called a skort. It was a short knife or accordion pleated skirt with an attached bloomer underneath. Years later, the term was applied to a pair of shorts with a flap of fabric across the front (and often the back) making the garment appear to be a skirt. In recent years, the term skort has been given to any skirt with an attached pair of shorts.

== Predecessors ==
The origins of skorts may be related back to earlier garments such as bloomers and jupe-culottes which grew in popularity in the late 19th century and early 20th century, despite common public disapproval for women wearing pants. In 1911, Paul Poiret produced several designs that were a combination of skirts and trousers, and they became known as jupe-culottes or as harem pants. Similar to skorts, culottes involve various styles that may appear as a hybrid between pants and skirts. Skorts are distinguished by their construction as a pair of shorts with material over it to make it appear as a skirt.

== Women's sports ==
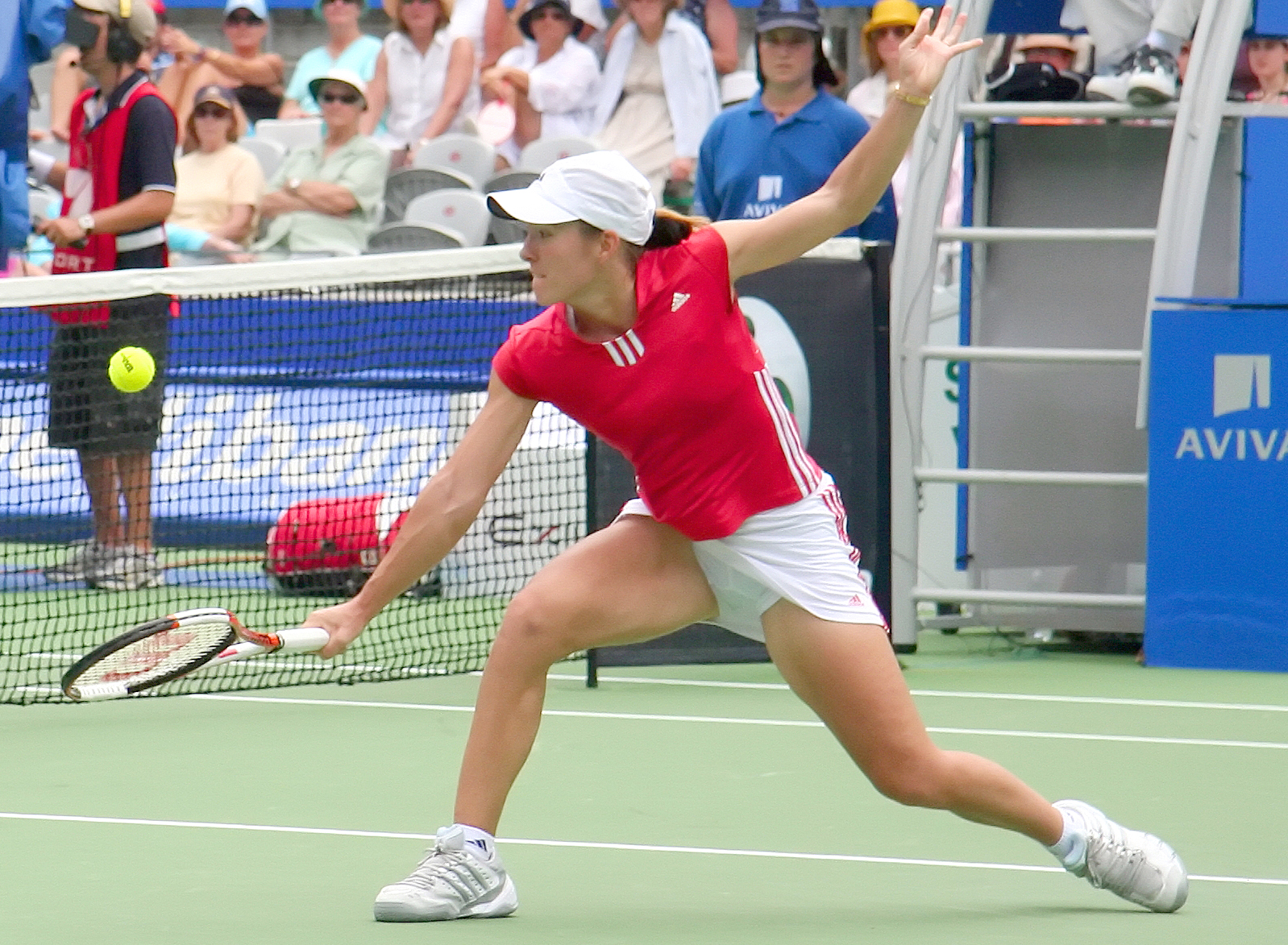
Justine Henin wearing a skort

The first noted skort-like clothing to be worn as tennis attire was done so by the Spanish player, Lilí Álvarez, who wore a pair of culottes which had been shaped to resemble a skirt during her Wimbledon match in 1931. Skorts have become common in sports such as field hockey, tennis, golf, ten-pin bowling and camogie.

Skorts have also gained popularity in casual and athletic wear due to brands such as Lululemon. High-waisted skorts, skorts with ruffles or asymmetrical hems, and skorts made with patterned or textured fabrics have all become popular options.

=== Camogie ===
In camogie, the requirement for skirt-like clothing is viewed by some as archaic. A request for shorts to be permitted was rejected by governing body the Camogie Association in April 2024. Skorts are criticised by a majority of players as being uncomfortable, and giving rise to concerns about exposure in media content. All players on both sides in a 2025 Leinster Senior Camogie Championship game protested by wearing shorts, but all were required to change to skorts, otherwise the game would be abandoned.

== See also ==
- Women and trousers
