= Casual wear =

Western dress code suited for everyday use

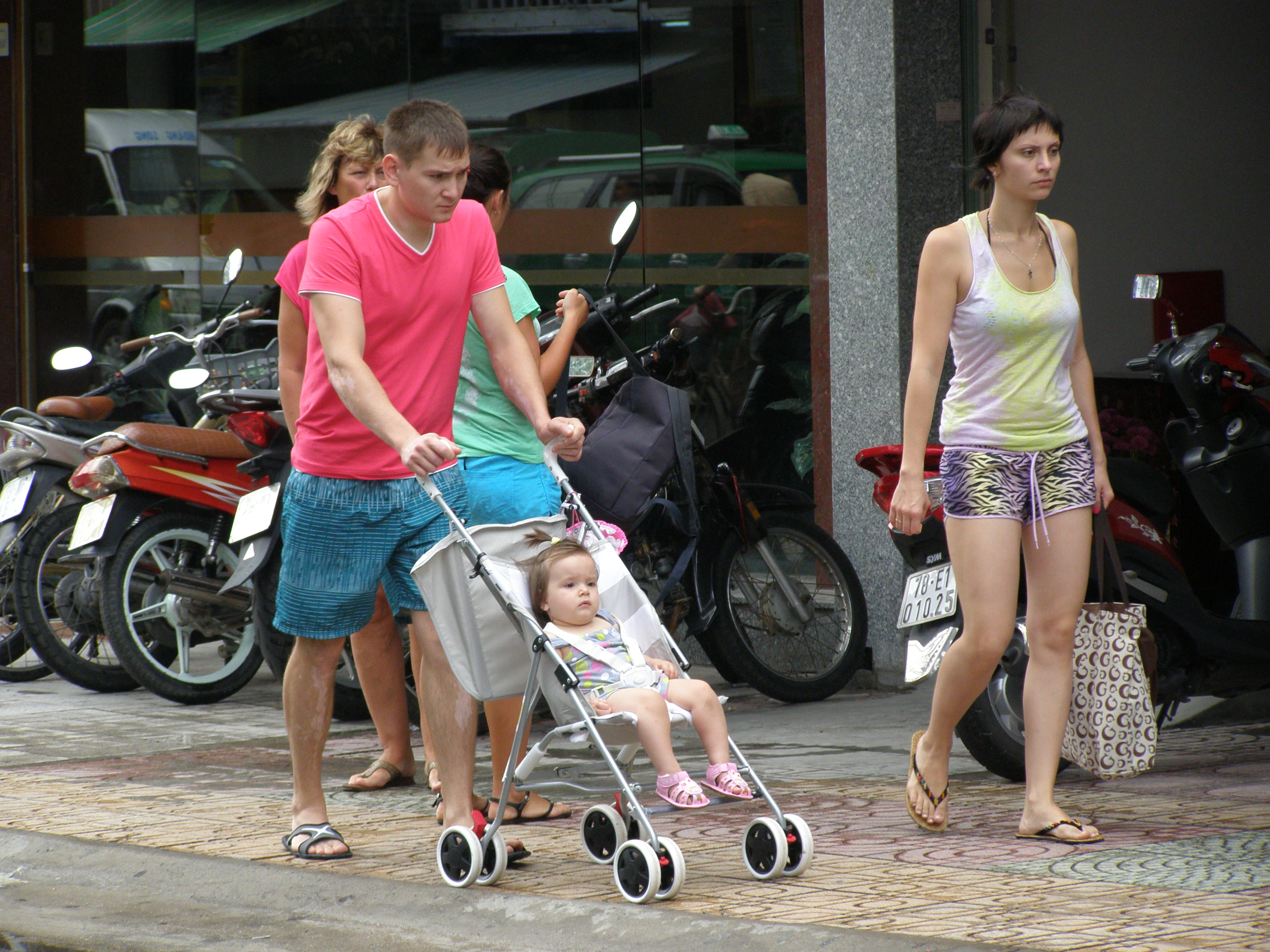
Parents in casual wear with their child, 2013

Casual wear (or casual attire or clothing) is a Western dress code that is relaxed, occasional, spontaneous and suited for everyday use. Casual wear became popular in the Western world following the counterculture of the 1960s. Leisurewear or loungewear is also emphasized for casual wear.

While casual is "informal" in the sense of "not formal", informal wear traditionally refers to a Western dress code associated with suits—a step below semi-formal wear—thus being more formal than casual attire.

== Overview ==
=== History ===
Modern casual fashion can be traced to fashion sportswear from the 1920s, including tweed blazers, oxford shoes, and golf skirts. An increase in the popularity of bicycling brought about a need for culottes, a forerunner for casual shorts. As the century progressed, "casual" came to encompass more styles, including denim workwear and elements from military uniforms. With the popularity of spectator sports in the late 20th century, a good deal of athletic gear has influenced casual wear, such as jogging suits, running shoes, and track clothing. Basic materials used for casual wear include denim, cotton, jersey, flannel, and fleece. Materials such as velvet, chiffon, and brocade are often associated with more formal clothes.

While casual dress evokes utilitarian costume, there is a wide range for expression, including punk fashion and fashion inspired by earlier decades, such as the 1970s and 1980s. Madonna popularized lace, jewelry, and cosmetics into casual wear during the 1980s. In the 1990s, hip hop fashion played up elaborate jewelry and luxurious materials worn in conjunction with athletic gear and the clothing of manual labor.

== Gender expression ==
Casual wear introduced a "unisexing" of fashion. By the 1960s, women adopted T-shirts, jeans, and collared shirts, and for the first time in nearly 200 years, it was fashionable for men to have long hair. Casual wear is typically the dress code in which forms of gender expression are experimented with. An example is masculine jewelry, which was once considered shocking or titillating even in casual circles, and is now hardly noteworthy in semi-formal situations. Amelia Bloomer introduced trousers of a sort for women as a casual alternative to formal hoops and skirts. The trend toward female exposure in the 20th century tended to push the necklines of formal ball gowns lower and the skirts of cocktail dresses higher.

Jeans, dress shirt (casually turn down collared), and a T-shirt or sleeveless shirt are typically considered casual wear for men in modern times. For men, the exposure of shoulders, thighs, and backs is still limited to casual wear.

== Gallery ==
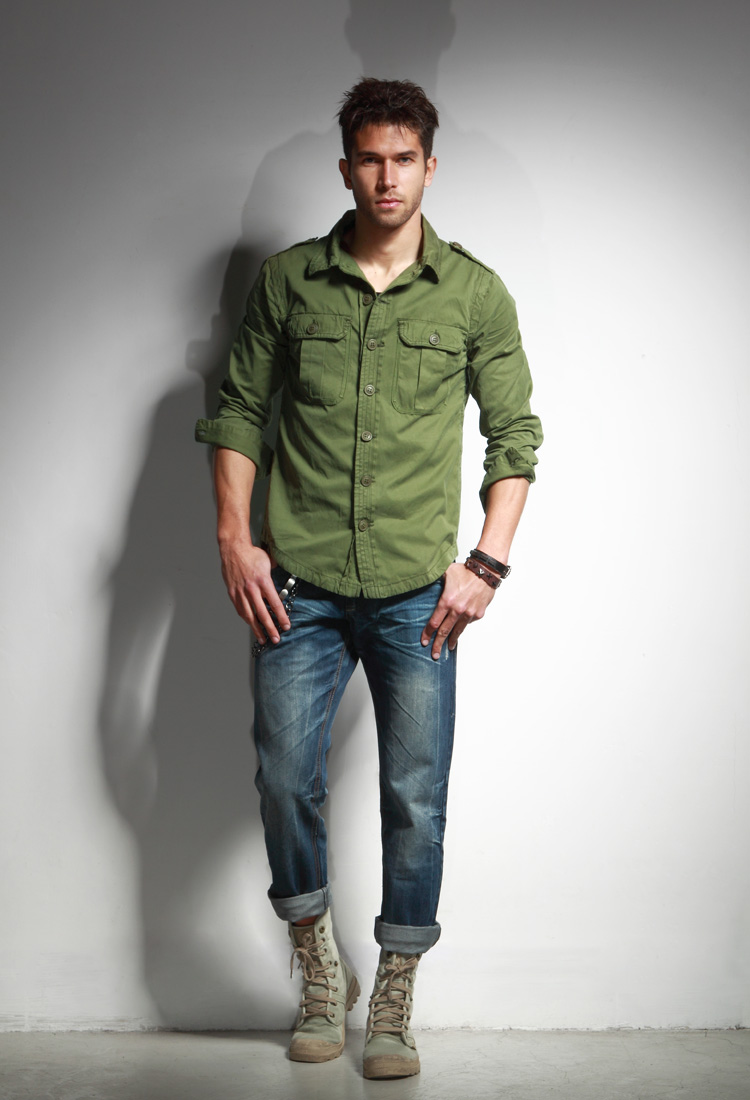
Model in jeans and a military-style shirt.

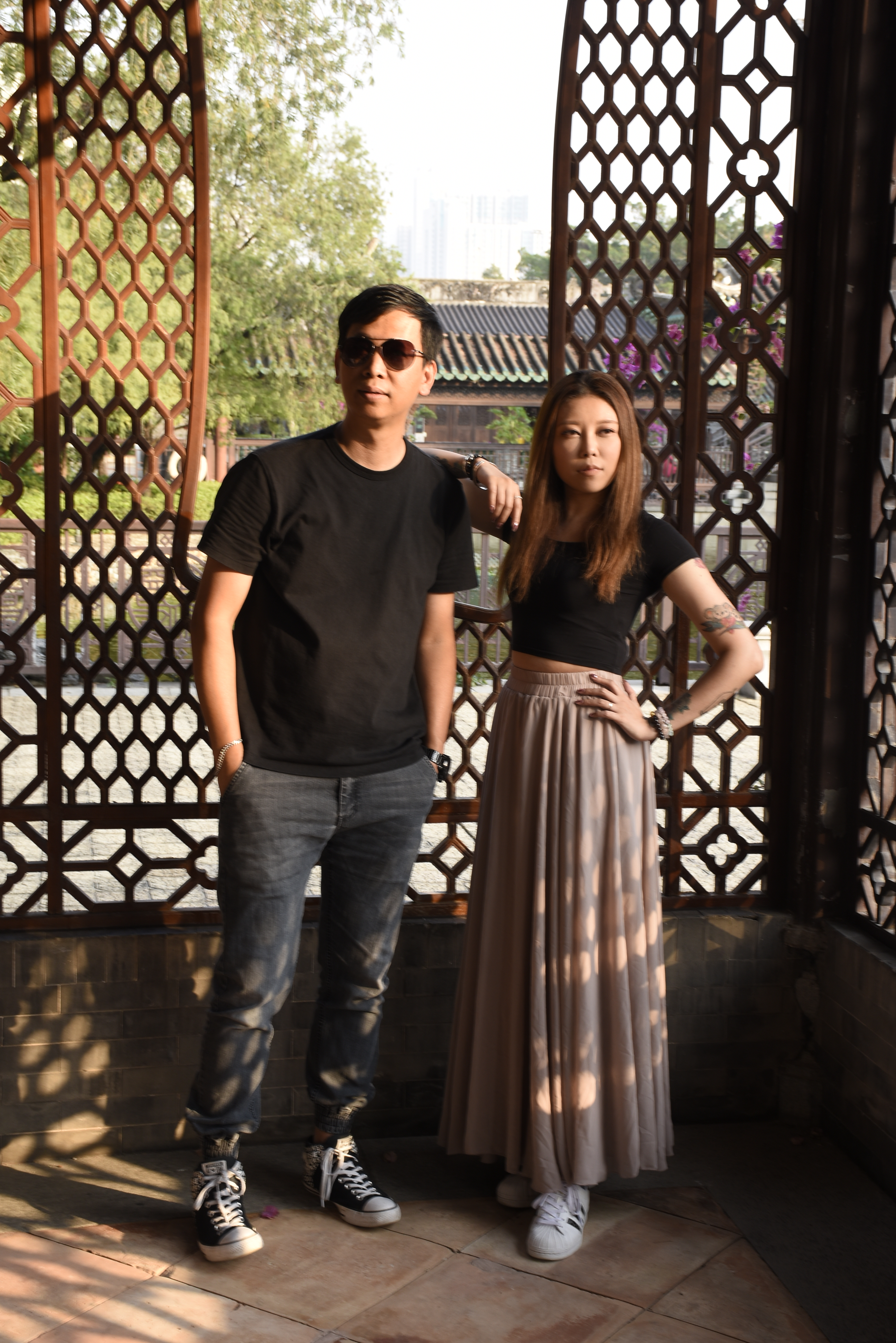
A man wearing a T-shirt and jeans and a woman wearing black T-shirt and white long skirt

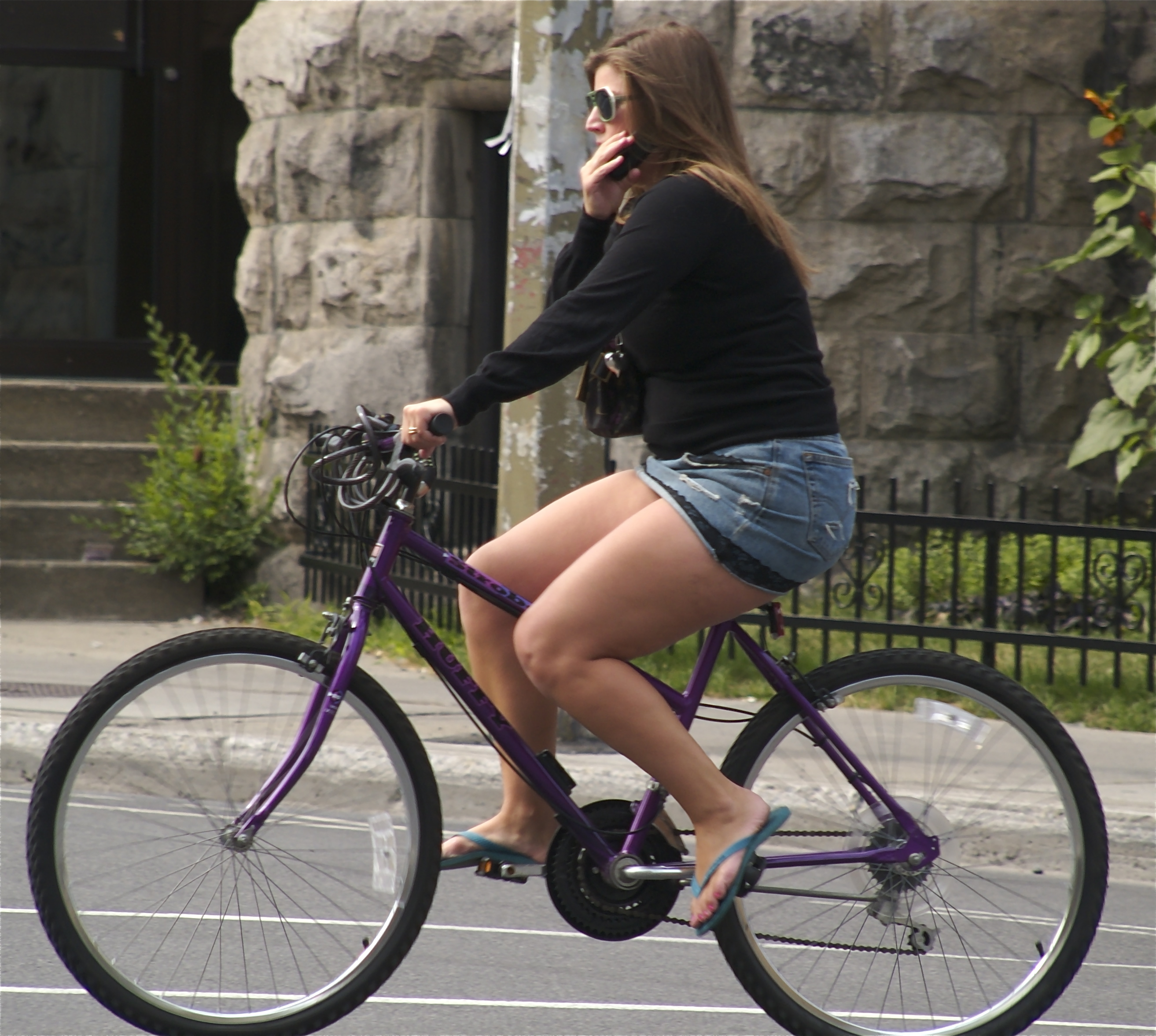
A woman cycling while wearing a sweater and miniskirt in Canada.

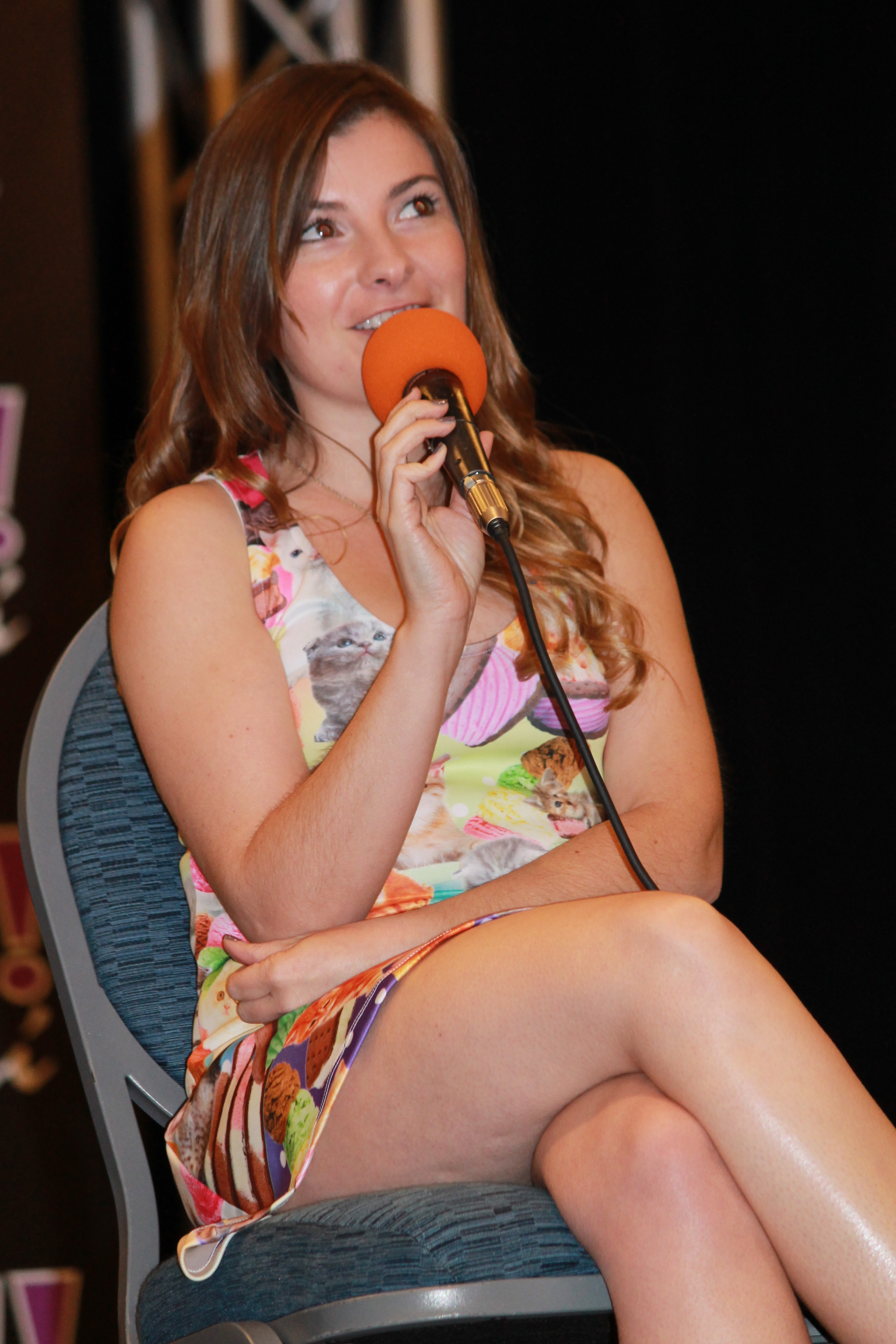
Voice actress Cassandra Morris wearing a casual minidress during a public interaction.

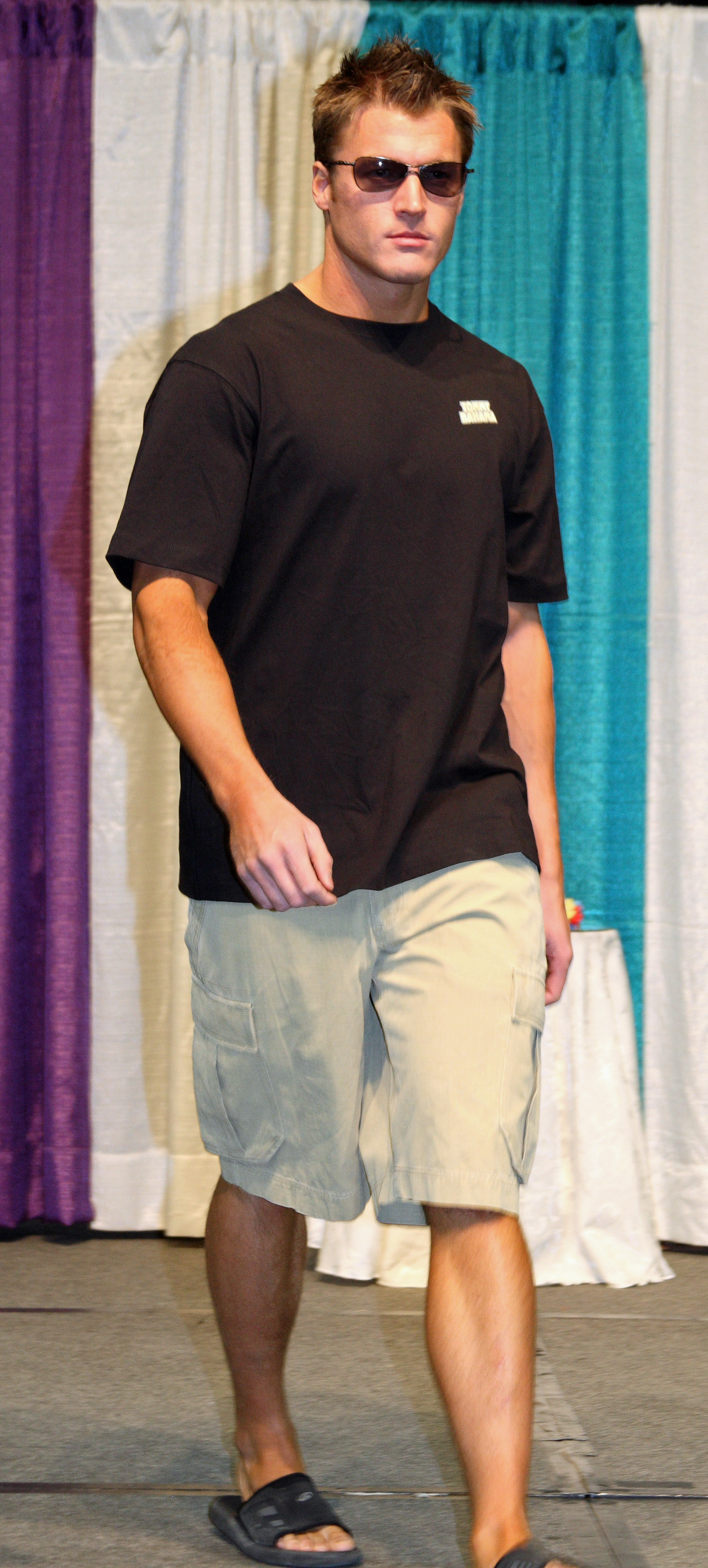
A model in T-shirt and cargo shorts.

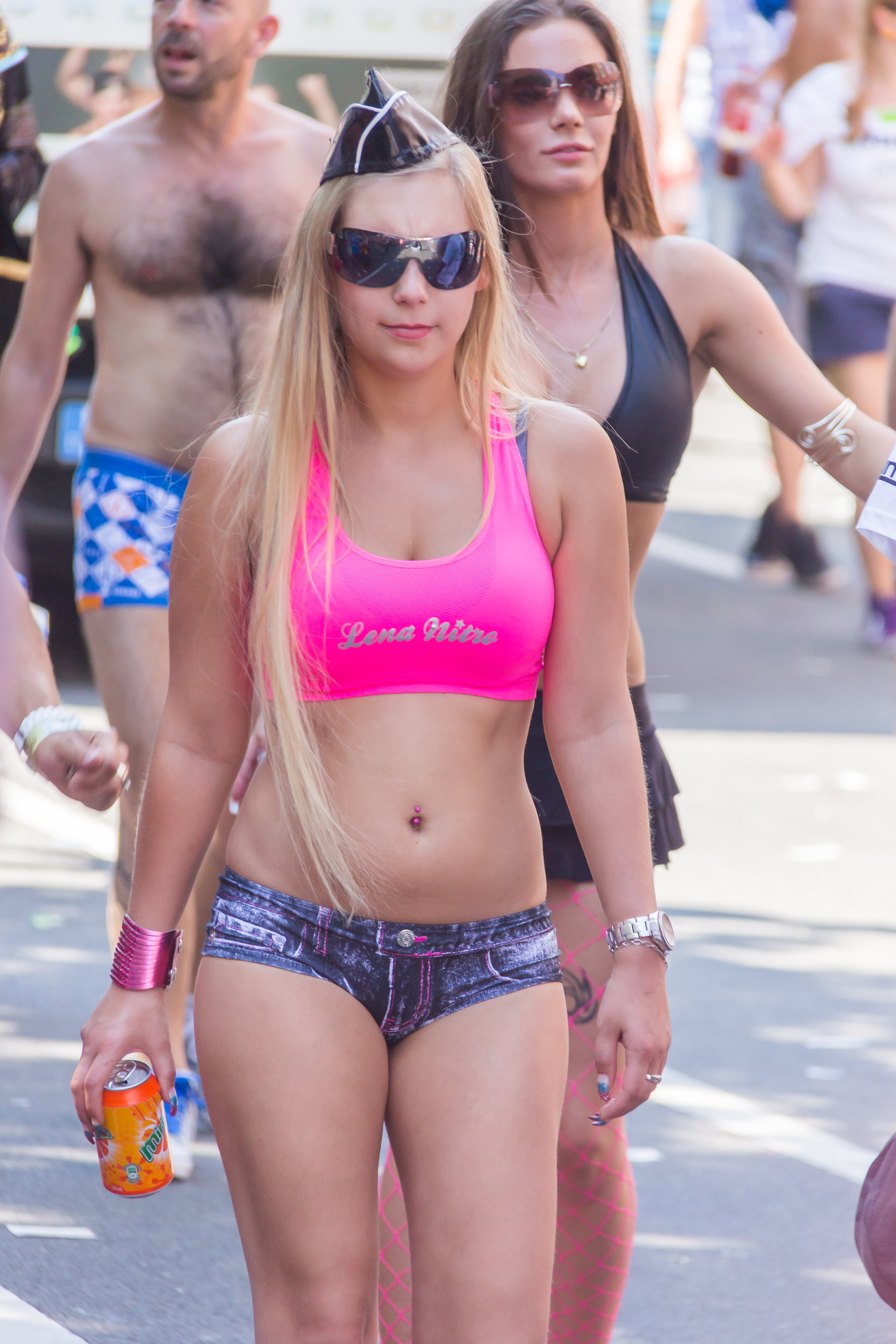
A woman in bra-shaped top and mini-shorts in Germany

== See also ==
- 2020s in fashion
- Athleisure
- Ready-to-wear
- Western dress codes
