= Internet activism =

Use of the internet to facilitate activism

Internet activism (Note: Also known as web activism, online activism, social media activism, digital campaigning, digital activism, online organizing, electronic advocacy, e-campaigning, and e-activism.) involves the use of electronic-communication technologies such as social media, e-mail, and podcasts for various forms of activism to enable faster and more effective communication by citizen movements, the delivery of particular information to large and specific audiences, as well as coordination. Internet technologies are used by activists for cause-related fundraising, community building, lobbying, and organizing. A digital-activism campaign is "an organized public effort, making collective claims on a target authority, in which civic initiators or supporters use digital media." Research has started to address specifically how activist/advocacy groups in the U.S. and in Canada use social media to achieve digital-activism objectives.

== Types ==
Within online activism Sandor Vegh distinguished three principal categories: active/reactive, organization/mobilization, and awareness/advocacy based. Active/reactive refers to either being proactive in efforts to bring about change or reacting to issues after they happen. Organization/mobilization refers to gathering people and information together for online or offline activism. Awareness/advocacy refers to sharing information to make others aware of an issue or advocating for issues and campaigns. There are other ways of classifying Internet activism, such as by the degree of reliance on the Internet versus offline mobilization. Thus, Internet sleuthing or hacking could be viewed as purely online forms of activism, whereas the Occupy Wall Street movement was mainly conducted offline, and only partially online.

== Development processes ==
Exploring the dynamics of online activism for expressing resistance to a powerful organization, a study developed a critical mass approach to online activism. The results were integrated in a four-year longitudinal process model that explains how online activism started, generated societal outcomes, and changed over time. The model suggests that online activism helped organize collective actions and amplify the conditions for revolutionary movements to form. Yet, it provoked elites' reactions such as Internet filtering and surveillance, which do not only promote self-censorship and generate digital divide, but contribute to the ultimate decline of activism over time. The process model suggests a complex interplay among stakeholders' interests, opportunities for activism, costs, and outcomes that are neither foreseen nor entirely predictable. The authors challenge universal access to the Internet as a convenient and cost-free forum for practicing social activism by organizational stakeholders (customers, employees, outside parties). In fact, the technology enablers of social activism also enable its filtering and repression, and thus, more extreme states of information asymmetry may result in which powerful elites preserve their status and impose a greater digital divide.

In one study, a discussion of a developmental model of political mobilization is discussed. By citizens joining groups and creating discussion, they are beginning their first stage of involvement. Progressively, it is hoped that they will begin signing petitions online and graduating to offline contact as long as the organization provides the citizen with escalating steps of involvement (Vitak et al., 2011).

The issue of the mass media's centrality has been highly contested, with some people arguing that it promoted the voices of marginalized groups while others believe it sends forth the messages of the majority alone, leaving minority groups to have their voices robbed.

== Examples of early activism ==
One early instance of online activism was opposition to the release of Lotus Marketplace. On April 10, 1990, Lotus announced a direct-mail marketing database product that was to contain name, address, demographic, and spending habit information on 120 million individual U.S. citizens. While much of the same data was already available elsewhere, privacy advocates worried about the availability of this data collected within one easily searchable database. Furthermore, the data would be distributed on CD-ROM and could not be changed until a new edition was released.

In response, a mass e-mail and E-bulletin-board campaign was started, which included information on contacting Lotus and form letters. Larry Seiler, a New England–based computer professional, posted a message that was widely reposted on newsgroups and via e-mail: "It will contain a LOT of personal information about YOU, which anyone in the country can access by just buying the discs. It seems to me (and to a lot of other people, too) that this will be a little too much like big brother, and it seems like a good idea to get out while there is still time." Over 30,000 people contacted Lotus and asked for their names to be removed from the database. On January 23, 1991, Lotus announced that it had cancelled MarketPlace.

In 1998 Dr. Daniel Mengara, a Gabonese scholar and activist living New Jersey, created a website called Bongo Doit Partir (Bongo Must Go) to encourage a revolution against the regime of Omar Bongo in Gabon. In July 2003, Amnesty International reported the arrest of five Gabonese known to be members of Bongo Doit Partir. The members were detained for three months.

Another well-known example of early Internet activism took place in 1998, when the Mexican rebel group EZLN used decentralized communications, such as cell phones, to network with developed world activists and help create the anti-globalization group Peoples Global Action (PGA) to protest the World Trade Organization (WTO) in Geneva. The PGA continued to call for "global days of action" and rally support of other anti-globalization groups in this way.

Later, a worldwide network of Internet activist sites, under the umbrella name of Indymedia, was created to provide coverage of the 1999 Seattle WTO protests. Dorothy Kidd quotes Sheri Herndon in a July 2001 telephone interview about the role of the Internet in the anti-WTO protests: "The timing was right, there was a space, the platform was created, the Internet was being used, we could bypass the corporate media, we were using open publishing, we were using multimedia platforms. So those hadn't been available, and then there was the beginning of the anti-globalization movement in the United States."

Kony 2012, a short film released on March 5, 2012, was intended to promote the charity's "Stop Kony" movement to Ugandan militant Joseph Kony globally known the hopes of having him arrested by the campaign's scheduled expiration at the end of 2012 The film spread virally. A poll suggested that more than half of young adult Americans heard about Kony 2012 in the days following the video's release. It was included among the top international events of 2012 by PBS and called the most viral video ever by Time.

== Uses ==
Internet activism has had the effect of causing increased collective action among people, as found by Postmes and Brunsting (2002), who discovered a tendency among internet users to rely on internalized group memberships and social identities in order to achieve social involvement online. The Internet is "tailor-made for a populist, insurgent movement," says Joe Trippi, who managed the Howard Dean campaign. In his campaign memoir, The Revolution Will Not Be Televised, Trippi notes that:

[The Internet's] roots in the open-source ARPAnet, its hacker culture, and its decentralized, scattered architecture make it difficult for big, establishment candidates, companies and media to gain control of it. And the establishment loathes what it can't control. This independence is by design, and the Internet community values above almost anything the distance it has from the slow, homogeneous stream of American commerce and culture. Progressive candidates and companies with forward-looking vision have an advantage on the Internet, too. Television is, by its nature, a nostalgic medium. Look at Ronald Reagan's campaign ads in the 1980s – they were masterpieces of nostalgia promising a return to America's past glory and prosperity. The Internet, on the other hand, is a forward-thinking and forward-moving medium, embracing change and pushing the envelope of technology and communication.

=== Spreading information ===
The Internet is a key resource for independent activists, particularly those whose message may run counter to the mainstream. Listservs like Freedom News Group or BurmaNet assist in spreading news that would otherwise be inaccessible in these countries. Internet activists also organize petitions to be sent to the government as well as interest groups and organizations to protest or argue for change. Many non-profits and charities use these methods, emailing petitions to those on their email list and asking people to pass them on. The Internet also enables organizations such as NGOs to communicate with individuals in an inexpensive and timely manner. Indeed, many non-profit and advocacy organizations rely on the internet to launch campaigns with socially conscious messages to maintain a constant stream of revenue.

== Social media ==
TikTok has become an increasingly important platform for internet-based activism, particularly among younger users. Unlike earlier platforms centered on text or static images, TikTok relies on short-form video to disseminate activist messages through performance, storytelling, and audiovisual communication.

Research suggests that TikTok supports grassroots activism by lowering barriers to participation and enabling users to engage with political issues through everyday cultural practices such as humor, remixing, and trend participation. These affordances have positioned TikTok as a notable platform in contemporary internet activism, while also raising questions about algorithmic visibility and moderation. Younger users use short-form video to share information, mobilize communities, and amplify social justice movements. The app's algorithm-driven "For You Page" allows activist content to spread rapidly, enabling users with small followings to reach large audiences. Research shows that TikTok supports forms of "everyday activism," where users combine personal storytelling with political messaging through humor, trends, and participatory media practices.

TikTok has been used to organize and document several major activist movements, including Black Lives Matter, climate justice campaigns, and awareness initiatives related to Missing and Murdered Indigenous Women (MMIW). Activists use the platform to explain social issues, share lived experiences, document protests, counter misinformation, and preserve cultural and political narratives within marginalized communities. Because TikTok enables multimodal expression—such as music, text overlays, reenactments, and visual symbolism—it has become a site where cultural memory and activist knowledge are created and circulated in real time.

Scholars and activists have also raised concerns about censorship, content moderation, and algorithmic visibility on the platform. Some creators report experiencing reduced reach or "shadowbanning" on content related to racial justice or LGBTQ+ activism. Despite these limitations, TikTok remains an influential platform for youth-led digital activism, shaping public discourse both online and offline.

=== Hashtag activism ===
Hashtag activism is the use of hashtags for fighting or supporting a cause through the usage of social media outlets. The term "hashtag activism" first started circulating within journalism in 2011. Since then, its use has been associated with movements such as #MeToo, #BlackLivesMatter, #SayHerName, and many more.

One example of the rise of hashtag activism can be seen in the black feminist movement's use of hashtags to convey their cause. The hashtag "#IamJada" was an internet backlash to the mocking "#Jadapose" that went viral after sixteen-year-old girl Jada Smith was photographed following her gang rape. In this instance, a hashtag was employed to convey an anti-rape message.

Another instance of where this type of activism was utilized for the matter of feminism and women's right, occurred in China in relation to the outbreak of COVID-19. While the rule of the country put efforts into trying to hide and downplay the start of what would develop into the pandemic, pressured hospitals were in need of supplies in form of menstrual protection and related products. Supplies which they, despite the fact that the vast majority of the medical workers is made up of females, were not given access to. Amongst others, hashtags such as #RefusePeriodShame, circulated in protest to the ongoing situation and the Wuhan hospital authorities, who were considered responsible for it. Soon to follow on the same thread, one of the VTubers of the Chinese Communist Youth Party League (CYL), known as Jiangshanjiao, an avatar displayed as a youthful female, gave rise to No. JiangshanjiaoDoYouGetYourPeriod. The hashtag initially sparked from a post on Weibo where a user sarcastically wrote that exact question, to point out the absurdness in the societal denial of women's biological functions and needs. #JiangshanjiaoDoYouGetYourPeriod, while, like the previous hashtag mentioned, being censored and taken down by the government, had time to spread and catch a lot more attention than what #RefusePeriodShame did, and up until 15 March 2020, it accumulated over 89,200,000 views.

Other notable instances in which marginalized groups have used hashtags as organizing tools for social justice include responses to racial violence and police profiling, as in the case of #BlackLivesMatter and #JusticeForTrayvon, along with misogyny and gendered violence, such as #MeToo and #YesAllWomen.

The use of Hashtags has also been used as a way to spread awareness of different sicknesses and diseases, most notably the #IceBucketChallenge. In 2014, Anthony Senerchia and Pat Quinn, both living with Amyotrophic lateral sclerosis (ALS), started the challenge, which was initially a dare between friends. The challenge involved pouring ice-cold water, often with ice, over your head, something unique and engaging for their online followers. After completing the challenge, users would nominate 1-3 of their friends to do the same. Pete Frates, a former Boston College baseball player living with ALS joined Quinn and Senerchia and spearheaded the social media campaign that would explode in the weeks and months ahead. Many notable participants of the #IceBucketChallenge included Lady Gaga, Selena Gomez, and Justin Bieber. These celebrities set a precedent for their almost 45 million total followers they had at the time. Since the initial popularity in 2014, the #IceBucketChallenge has been shared in over 17 million posts and generated over 70 billion views on Facebook alone. This massive popularity created awareness of the rare disease as well as contributing to over $115 million raised worldwide for the ALS Association. The ALS Association used most of the money raised online to fund ALS-specific research. In 2016, the funding led scientists to be able to identify a new ALS-linked gene (NEK1). This gene helps scientists better understand the biological pathways that contribute to the development of ALS over time.

==== Black Lives Matter ====
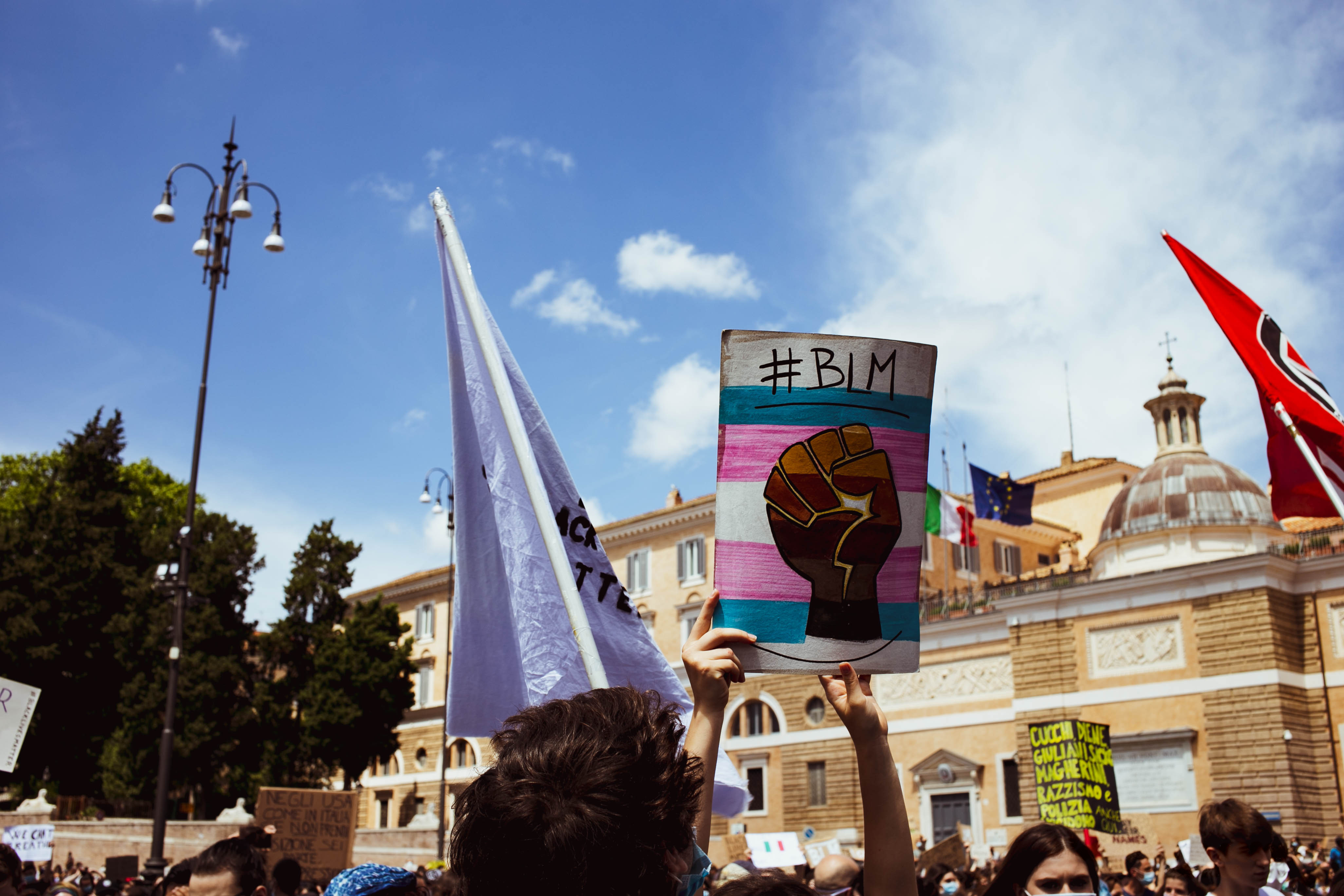

One of the most prominent uses of hashtag activism is #BlackLivesMatter, a social justice movement that first began after George Zimmerman was acquitted for the shooting and killing of Trayvon Martin, an African American teenage boy. The movement started as a hashtag and now it has been at the forefront of the fight against police brutality and racial profiling across the world.

After the killing of Martin on February 26, 2012, several people wanted justice. The hashtag started to grow in popularity, with a Change.org petition calling for an investigation and prosecution of George Zimmerman. Social media users, including many celebrities retweeted, shared, and created new petitions, eventually raising over 2.1 million signatures combined by March 26, 2012. By April 11, 2012, Zimmerman was charged with the second-degree murder of Trayvon Martin.

After George Zimmerman was acquitted on July 13, 2013, a "letter to Black folks" was posted to Facebook by Alicia Garza. Garza ended her letter with the statement "Black lives matter", which her friend turned into a hashtag below. From here, #BlackLivesMatter or simply "BLM" became the movement against police brutality and killings of unarmed African Americans, as well as hate crimes and racially motivated crimes.

#BlackLivesMatter's impact does not end online. The formation of Black Lives Matter allowed for activists across the United States to organize in-person protests and rallies together, no matter where they may be located. U.S. politicians—such as Ilhan Omar and Alexandria Ocasio-Cortez—have endorsed Black Lives Matter, aligning themselves with a push for racial justice.

The most recent display of how the Black Lives Matter movement has been used as a platform for offline activism is the 2020 BLM protests that occurred after 17-year old Darnella Frazier live-streamed on Facebook the murder of George Floyd by then-police officer Derek Chauvin. Protests took place in all 50 states, as well as in many countries around the world.

==== March For Our Lives ====
After the Parkland high school shooting on February 14, 2018, #MarchForOurLives was born. Students came together to create this hashtag to fight for gun control in the U.S. This hashtag turned into an entire movement of over 800 protests across the United States with the main protest taking place in Washington, D.C. There was an estimated 200,000 people in attendance at the Washington, D.C. protest, alone.

=== TikTok ===
TikTok's platform has been increasingly used for raising up social issues through short videos, especially after an allegedly make-up tutorial turned into a call to action on China's treatment of Muslim Uighurs. The tutorial was banned for 50 minutes on November 26, 2019. Eric Han, the heads of TikTok's US content-moderation team, claimed the banning was due to a "human moderation error". The Chinese owners declared the app does not remove content based on sensitivities to China.TikTok also partnered up with UN Women in a campaign fighting women violence in India which kicked off on November 25, 2019. The campaign can be found under the hashtag #KaunsiBadiBaatHai and features short videos with positive and negative examples of men interacting with women.

In July 2020, the TikTok platform played a major role in the #FreeBritney movement surrounding Britney Spears and her conservatorship dispute. Though such activism led to a significant increase in public awareness of the case, it was criticized for spreading misinformation regarding the conservatorship alongside a number of conspiracy theories of varying accuracy.

TikTok has also become an important tool for digital activism in global protest movements. During the 2022 demonstrations in Iran following the death of Mahsa Amini, users shared protest footage, symbolic imagery, and messages of solidarity that circulated widely despite government attempts to restrict internet access.

By 2025, U.S. users' trust in the platform had decreased, and fears of censorship and shadow bans have emerged. However, TikTok continues to be used for online activism and building an alternative system of informing about social and political processes. For example, since January 2025, the phrase "Cute winter boots." was used in various forms to refer to videos in which users warned of ICE raids and expressed concerns about the state's immigration policies. However, many people without meaningful messages joined the action, and according to experts and many users, the trend ceases to serve its original purpose (informing people and motivating them to real actions) and essentially turned into posting for the sake of posting.

=== Use in political campaigns ===
==== 2004 Presidential Campaign ====
When discussing the 2004 U.S. presidential election candidates, Carol Darr, director of the Institute for Politics, Democracy & the Internet at George Washington University in Washington, D.C., said of the candidates which benefited from use of the Internet to attract supporters: "They are all charismatic, outspoken mavericks and insurgents. Given that the Internet is interactive and requires an affirmative action on the part of the users, as opposed to a passive response from TV users, it is not surprising that the candidate has to be someone people want to touch and interact with."

A more decentralized approach to campaigning arose, in contrast to a top-down, message-focused approach usually conducted in the mainstream. "The mantra has always been, 'Keep your message consistent. Keep your message consistent,'" said John Hlinko, who has participated in Internet campaigns for MoveOn.org and the electoral primary campaign of Wesley Clark. "That was all well and good in the past. Now it's a recipe for disaster. You can choose to have a Stalinist structure that's really doctrinaire and that's really opposed to grassroots. Or you can say, 'Go forth. Do what you're going to do.' As long as we're running in the same direction, it's much better to give some freedom."

==== 2008 Presidential Campaign ====
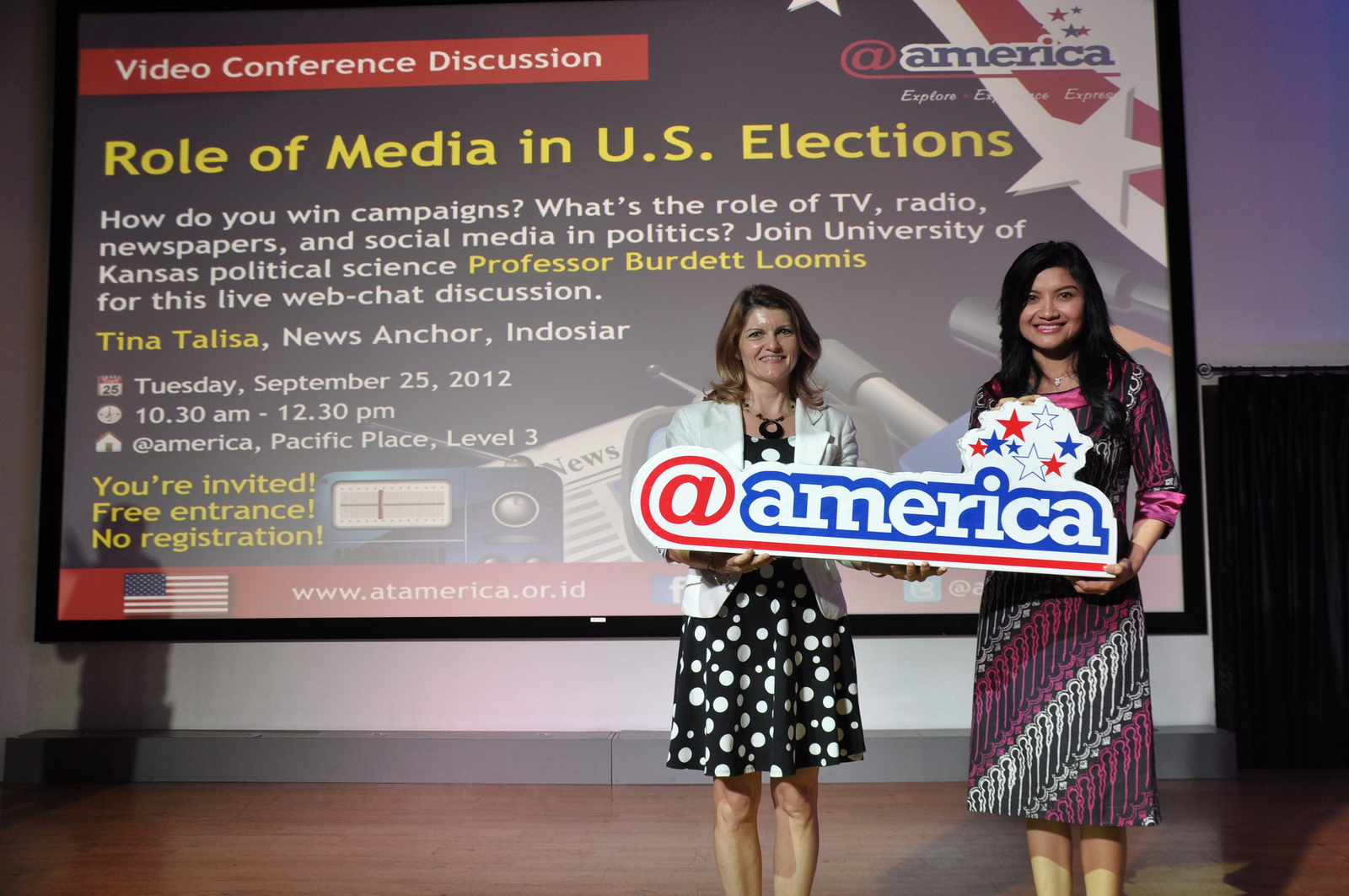
Professor Burdett Loomis from the University of Kansas spoke at @America via DVC on Tuesday, September 25, in front of a crowd of university students majoring in communications and connected to five American Corners via Webchat. Professor Loomis traced the evolution of the use of media as a political tool during elections and questioned the actual influence of media on voters.

Two-thirds of Internet users under the age of 30 have an SNS, and during the 2008 election, half of them used an SNS site for candidate information (Hirzalla, 2010). MoveOn.org endorsed then-Senator Barack Obama in 2008, and used this endorsement as an opportunity to encourage grassroots advertising. MoveOn hosted a competition that requested submissions from ordinary citizens with the criteria the digital ads were positive towards Obama. The contest drew 1,000 entries of 30-second ads for Obama that streamed on YouTube. This endorsement by a grassroots organization, and the ensuing contest, is an example of agenda setting that scholars have been studying ever since social media and digital content began influencing presidential politics.

Studies delving into the 2008 presidential campaign examined inequality online of various ideologies deriving from various socioeconomic and cultural backgrounds. Scholars concluded the 2008 race, and the influence of online politicking, did not see an empowerment of new voices. The idea that digital literacy become a concept taught in school, with educators incorporating blogging, commenting, and creating content as part of their curriculum, has been bandied about among social and political scientists in an effort to turn online enthusiasm from young people into demonstrable results at the ballot box.

==== 2016 Presidential Campaign ====
The 2016 presidential election changed the digital landscape again. Digital media scholars note that the hopes of developing digital literacy post 2008 turned into a fomenting distrust of traditional news media. People of all ages and political inclinations gravitated towards social media sources that acted as echo chambers, and online personalities and organizations were held in higher esteem than traditional news sources.

== Digital activism ==
=== Non-traditional activism ===
The Internet has become the catalyst for protests such as Occupy Wall Street and the Arab Spring as those involved have increasingly relied on social media to organize and stay connected. In Myanmar, online news paper Freedom News Group has leaked some government corruption and fuel to protests.

In 2017, the Sleeping Giants cyberactivist group, among others, launched a boycott campaign against controversial, conservative webpage Breitbart News, getting more than 2,000 organizations to remove it from ad buys.

=== Corporate activism ===
Corporations are also using Internet activist techniques to increase support for their causes. According to Christopher Palmeri with BusinessWeek Online, companies launch sites with the intent to positively influence their own public image, to provide negative pressure on competitors, to influence opinion within select groups, and to push for policy changes.

The clothing manufacturer, American Apparel is an example: The company hosts a website called Legalize LA that advocates immigration reform via blog, online advertising, links to news stories and educational materials. Protest groups have responded by posting YouTube videos and establishing a boycott website.

Corporate methods of information dissemination is labelled "astroturfing", as opposed to "grassroots activism", due to the funding for such movements being largely private. More recent examples include the right-wing FreedomWorks.org which organized the "Taxpayer March on Washington" on September 12, 2009, and the Coalition to Protect Patients' Rights, which opposes universal health care in the U.S.

=== Religious activism ===
Cybersectarianism is a new organizational form which involves: "highly dispersed small groups of practitioners that may remain largely anonymous within the larger social context and operate in relative secrecy, while still linked remotely to a larger network of believers who share a set of practices and texts, and often a common devotion to a particular leader. Overseas supporters provide funding and support; domestic practitioners distribute tracts, participate in acts of resistance, and share information on the internal situation with outsiders. Collectively, members and practitioners of such sects construct viable virtual communities of faith, exchanging personal testimonies and engaging in collective study via email, on-line chat rooms and web-based message boards."

=== Political activism ===
==== Online extremism ====
The Internet is widely accessible by everyone. Thus, it has, since its beginning, increasingly become a place where various opinions are expressed, and not seldom are those opinions ones from some very far end of the spectrum. Extremists of different sorts have come to heavily rely on the Internet to the point where it is no longer just a means amongst others to achieve a certain objective, but more often than not, it is where the main part of a movement takes place. Activities such as the conveyance of perceivably extreme, bureaucratic ideas, or even the outlining of strategic acts of violence or destruction, are ones nowadays likely to occur online. In other words, this type of "online extremism" could, though difficult to precisely define, be described as the subcategory of Internet activism that is brought forward by, or connected with, individuals or groups that possess what are generally viewed to be extreme opinions.

==== White Nationalism ====
In 1998, former KKK Grand Wizard David Duke wrote on his website, "I believe that the internet will begin a chain reaction of racial enlightenment that will shake the world by the speed of its intellectual conquest." White nationalists quickly saw the potential of the Internet as a platform to effectively disseminate their message to a mass audience.

This exploitation of technological innovations is not a novel concept for this group. In the early 20th century, with the emergence of film technology, the KKK created their own film companies and produced films like The Toll of Justice (1923) to spread their message. Then, a century later, with the rise of digital technologies, the KKK adapted to the changing media landscape to become a digital movement. They not only adapted to the digital age, but also found vulnerabilities through which they could most quickly and efficiently insert their ideologies. Examples of this included strategic domain names and hidden propaganda content.

Today, white nationalists' efforts to push their principles on the Web combined with tech companies' belief in the Internet as "raceless" motivate white nationalists to continue to exploit algorithms and influence digital spaces such as Twitter. As algorithms work in a self-reinforcing manner, they worsen the psychological effects of confirmation bias. They provide search results that confirm one's beliefs and biases and, further, connect one to communities of like-minded people. This works in favor of white nationalists; for example, search engines' autocomplete features suggest racist notions, and make White supremacist sites readily accessible to users.

=== Environmental activism ===
One of the earliest books on activism was Don Rittner's Ecolinking: Everyone's Guide to Online Environmental Information, published by Peachpit Press in 1992. Rittner, an environmental activist from upstate New York, spent more than 20 years researching and saving the Albany Pine Barrens. He was a beta tester for America Online and ran their Environmental Forum for the company from 1988 to when it launched in 1990. He took his early environmental knowledge and computer savvy and wrote what was called the bible of the online environmental community. It showed new Net users how to get online, find environmental information, connect to environmentalists around the world, and how to use those resources to save the planet.

In August 2018, a movement of environmental activism was initiated in Sweden, by now widely known climate activist Greta Thunberg. It all started with Greta, 15 years of age at the time and influenced by the creation of #MarchForOurLives, giving her opinion on the ongoing climate change, by displaying a large sign in front of the Swedish Riksdag (parliament) in protest. This act would start the "School Strike for Climate" (SSC) (Swedish: Skolstrejk för klimatet), a movement that would eventually spread, largely through attention in media, across the globe and develop into something that came to be internationally named "Fridays for Future" (FFF). Through having children miss classes on Fridays to participate in the strike, it has from the moment it started until today, reached and affected leading governments of the world by raising environmental awareness.

In 2020 in England, Wales and Northern Ireland, the National Trust began the #BlossomWatch campaign, which encouraged people to share the first signs of Spring with one another, in particular images of blossom.

=== Sexual assault activism ===
Activism against sexual assault is often led on the internet, where individuals may feel comfortable talking about uncomfortable topics. One such movements is the #NotGuilty movement. This movement began in April 2015 when Ione Wells, an Oxford University student shared a "letter to her attacker" in her college paper. The letter described how she was sexually assaulted and how she chose to respond and build from that point in her life. At the end of the letter she urged readers to send a letter back describing their own sexual assault experience with the hashtag #notguilty. She received so many letters from locals that she decided to create a website called "notGuiltyCampaign.co.uk". This caused global attention and inspired many to share their stories.

The Me Too movement is a similar movement that started in Hollywood. Initially, the activist Tarana Burke created the phrase back in 2006 to "empower women through empathy", but first over a decade later, the actress Alyssa Milano gave birth to the usage of the saying that would lead to the eventual spread of it, after using it in a post on Twitter, in which she acknowledged several accusations of sexual assault against film producer Harvey Weinstein. It would from there on not be long until it stretched and attached on various online platforms, and in no more than a day after Milano's tweet, the #MeToo hashtag had been reused over 500,000 times on that same media, as well as 4.7 million times on Facebook. The phrase was first used to demonstrate the amount of sexual assault that happens to young actresses and actors in Hollywood, and it was largely due to the early involvement of several well known individuals from the entertainment industry, who used the hashtag in their own posts, that the movement achieved the spread that it did. It soon expanded to apply to all forms of sexual assault, especially in the work place, and with time it also came to move from concerning mainly white heterosexual women, to eventually being used by both men and women with different sexualities and ethnicity.

These movements were intended to create an outlet for men and women to share their experiences with those with similar views without blame or guilt. They brought widespread attention to sexual assault and caused much controversy about changes that should be made accordingly. Criticism around movements such as these centers on concerns about whether or not participants are being dishonest for their own gain or are misinterpreting acts of kindness. However, the same Me Too movement, which also reached Egypt showed the adverse side of the activism where witness detention in one of the high-profile rape cases highlighted the prioritisation of traditional social morality by the government over women's rights in the country.

In Samoa, the non-profit organisation Brown Girl Woke began as a campaign on social media in 2014, which transitioned to offline community building and campaigning.

=== Hacktivism ===
Denial-of-Service attacks, the taking over and vandalizing of a website, uploading Trojan horses, and sending out e-mail bombs (mass e-mailings) are also examples of Internet activism. While the concept is difficult to exactly pinpoint, the phrase "hacktivism" summarizes the act of somehow utilizing hacking capabilities as a means to achieve some type of political goal, and the expression is occasionally also referred to as a variation of "cyberterrorism". The varieties of different routes groups of hacktivists choose to approach the organization, website or forum that they are taking on, can be categorized into different tactics. Some examples of those tactics or strategies are "DDoS attacks", "Doxing", and "Webdefacement", all of which are slightly different ways of reaching an often similar end goal. For additional understanding and explanation, as well as for more specific examples of these types of subversive actions, see hacktivism.

=== Relay activism ===
Relay activism is a kind of relay race in which netizens try to keep an online discussion alive and coherent. Netizens collectively and spontaneously use methods to avoid censorship, like a cat-and-mouse game. A story can "relay" for years.

== Impact on everyday political discussions ==
According to some observers, the Internet may have considerable potential to reach and engage opinion leaders who influence the thinking and behavior of others. According to the Institute for Politics, Democracy & the Internet, what they call "Online Political Citizens" (OPCs) are "seven times more likely than average citizens to serve as opinion leaders among their friends, relatives and colleagues… Normally, 10% of Americans qualify as Influentials. Our study found that 69% of Online Political Citizens are Influentials."

== Information communication technologies ==
Information communication technologies (ICTs) make communication and information readily available and efficient. There are millions of Facebook accounts, Twitter users and websites, and one can educate oneself on nearly any subject. While this is for the most part a positive thing, it can also be dangerous. For example, people can read up on the latest news events relatively easily and quickly; however, there is danger in the fact that apathy or fatigue can quickly arise when people are inundated with so many messages, or that the loudest voice on a subject can often be the most extreme one, distorting public perception on the issue.

These social networks which occupy ICTs are simply modern forms of political instruments which pre-date the technological era. People can now go to online forums or Twitter instead of town hall meetings. People can essentially mobilize worldwide through the Internet. Women can create transnational alliances and lobby for rights within their respective countries; they can give each other tips and share up-to-date information. This information becomes "hyper textual", available in downloadable formats with easy access for all. The UN organizations also use "hyper textual" formats. They can post information about upcoming summits, they can post newsletters on what occurred at these meetings, and links to videos can be shared; all of this information can be downloaded at the click of a button. The UN and many other actors are presenting this information in an attempt to get a certain message out in the cyber sphere and consequently steer public perception on an issue.

With information readily available, there is a rising trend of "slacktivism" or "clicktivism". While information is distributed so quickly and efficiently people often take this information for granted, or quickly forget about it once they have seen it flash across their screens. Viral campaigns, great for sparking interest and conversation, are not as effective in the long term—people begin to think that clicking "like" on something is enough of a contribution, or that posting information about a current hot topic means that they have made a difference.

== Fundraising capability ==
The Internet has also made it easier for small donors to play a meaningful role in financing political campaigns. Previously, small-donor fundraising was prohibitively expensive, as costs of printing and postage ate up most of the money raised. Groups like MoveOn, however, have found that they can raise large amounts of money from small donors at minimal cost, with credit card transaction fees constituting their biggest expense. "For the first time, you have a door into the political process that isn't marked 'big money,' " says Darr. "That changes everything."

The Internet also allows ordinary people to contribute materially to Humanitarian relief projects designed to intervene in situations of global disaster or tragedy, as in the case of the "Hope for Haiti Now" telethon event, which was launched three days after the 2010 Haiti Earthquake. The telethon and its broadcast became an effective vehicle to present a plea for support and to collect contributions quickly, facilitating a relationship between entertainment and humanitarian fundraising that has developed in response to historical and economic market conditions.

== Ethics ==
With internet technology vastly changing existing and introducing new mechanisms by which to attain, share and employ information, internet activism raises ethical issues for consideration. Proponents contend internet activism serves as an outlet for social progress but only if personal and professional ethics are employed. Supporters of online activism claim new information and communications technologies help increase the political power of activist groups that would otherwise have less resources. Proponents along this line of thinking claim the most effective use of online activism is its use in conjunction with more traditional or historical activism activities. Conversely, critics worry about facts and beliefs becoming indistinct in online campaigns and about "sectors of online activism [being] more self-interested than socially interested." These critics warn against the manipulation commonplace to online activism for private or personal interests such as exploiting charities for monetary gain, influencing voters in the political arena and inflating self-importance or effectiveness. In this sense, the ethical implication is that activism becomes descriptive rather than transformative of society. One of these reviewers suggests seven pitfalls to beware of in internet activism: "self-promotion at the expense of the movement... unsolicited bulk email... Hacktivism... violating copyright... nagging... violating privacy... and being scary."

== Criticism ==
=== Demographic issues ===
Critics argue that Internet activism faces the same challenges as other aspects of the digital divide, particularly the global digital divide. Some say it gives disproportionate representation to those with greater access or technological ability. Groups that may be disadvantaged by the move to activist activity online are those that have limited access to technologies, or lack the technological literacy to engage meaningfully online; these include ethnic and racial minorities, those of lower socioeconomic status, those with lower levels of education, and the elderly. Issues like racism and sexism are issues that internet activists reportedly deal with.

A study looked at the impact of Social Networking Sites (SNS) on various demographics and their political activity. College students used SNS for political activity the most, followed by a more unlikely group, those that had not graduated high school. The probability for non-white citizens to consume political information was shown to be higher than that of whites. Despite these findings, older generations, men and white people showed the highest levels of political mobilization. Acts of political mobilization, such as fundraising, volunteering, protesting require the most continued interest, resources and knowledge (Nam, 2010).

=== Polarization ===
One concern raised by University of California, Santa Cruz professor Barbara Epstein, is that the Internet "allows people who agree with each other to talk to each other and gives them the impression of being part of a much larger network than is necessarily the case." She warns that the impersonal nature of communication by computer may actually undermine the human contact that always has been crucial to social movements.

On the other hand, Scott Duke Harris of the San Jose Mercury News noted that "the Internet connects [all sides of issues, not just] an ideologically broad anti-war constituency, from the leftists of ANSWER to the pressed-for-time 'soccer moms' who might prefer MoveOn, and conservative activists as well."

=== Slacktivism ===
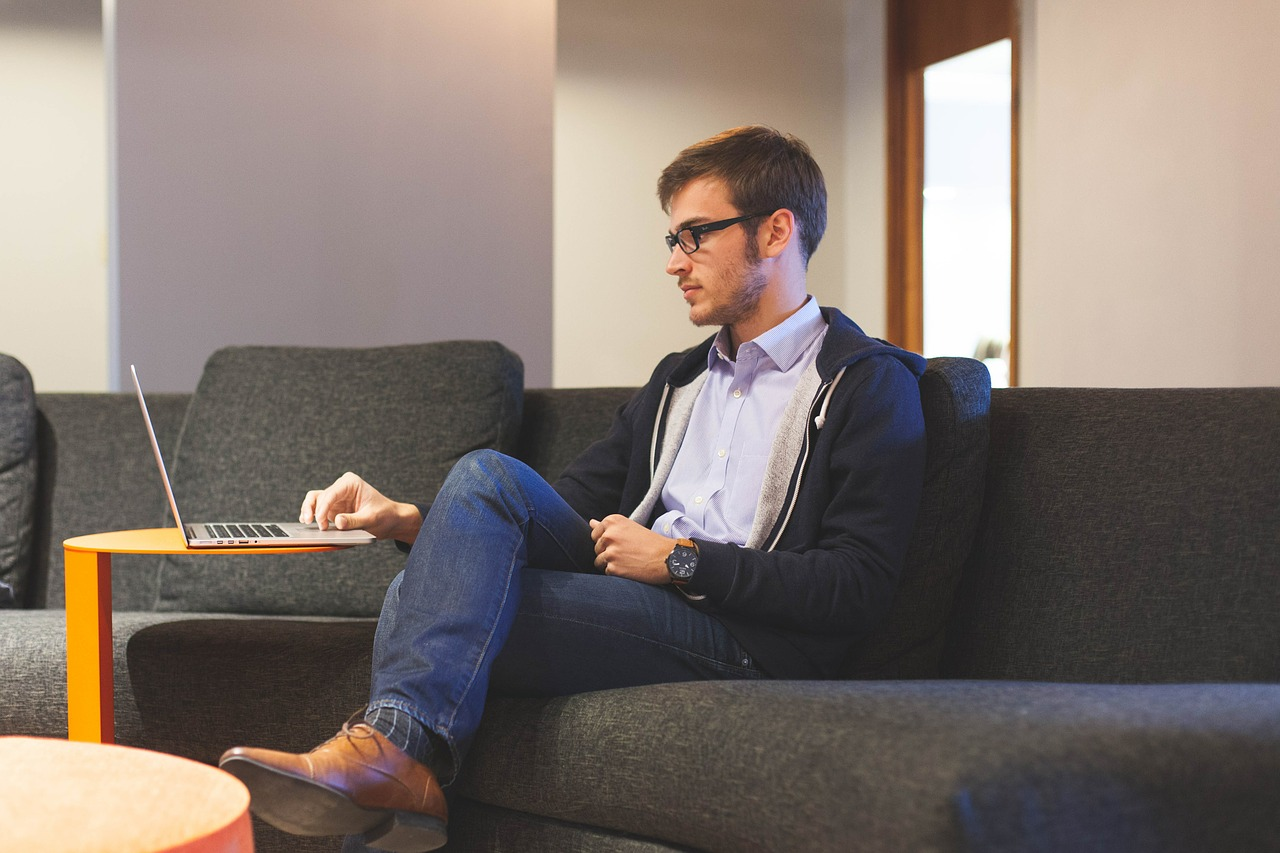

Activist Ralph Nader has stated that "the Internet doesn't do a very good job of motivating action", citing that the United States Congress, corporations and the Pentagon do not necessarily "fear the civic use of the Internet." Ethan Zuckerman talks about slacktivism, claiming that the Internet has devalued certain currencies of activism. Citizens may "like" an activist group on Facebook, visit a website, or comment on a blog, but fail to engage in political activism beyond the Internet, such as volunteering or canvassing. This critique has been criticized as Western-centric, however, because it discounts the impact this can have in authoritarian or repressive contexts. Journalist Courtney C. Radsch argued that even this low level of engagement was an important form of activism for Arab youth because it is a form of free speech, and can spark mainstream media coverage. University of North Carolina professor Zeynep Tufekci has argued that the need to put in significant organizing time in the pre-Internet era is what gave street protests their strength. Max Halupka, of the Canberra School of Politics, Economics and Society, likens slacktivism to "an impulsive and non-committal online political response."

Scholars are divided about whether the Internet will increase or decrease political participation, including slacktivism. Those who suggest political participation will increase believe the Internet can be used to recruit and communicate with more users, and offers lower-costs modes of participation for those who lack the time or motivation to engage otherwise. Those concerned that the Internet will decrease activism argue that the Internet occupies free time that can no longer be spent getting involved in activist groups, or that Internet activism will replace more substantial, effortful forms of in-person activism. The Pew Research Center has found that most Americans believe that while social media is at least a somewhat effective tool for building movements, but that it can make people think they are making a difference when they aren't. The Pew Research Center has also found that about 79% of adults believe that "slacktivism" distracts consumers from issues that are truly important and that the majority of adults found that social media resulted in some of form of negative result.

Canadian journalist and writer Malcolm Gladwell argues that activism through social media and the internet cannot be successful because they promote a 'lazy' way of activism that doesn't require people to put in meaningful effort. For example, 'liking' a protest related post on social media, people feel like they have contributed to a cause, which makes them less likely to take more costly, and some would argue more effective, action like joining a protest.

With cases such as the Black Lives Matter and #MeToo movements, it shows how internet activism can become more than slacktivism. Scholars have found that internet activist communities and offline activist communities work closely together, rather than being two separate entities. With internet activism, activists can organize without the constraints of physical location. The Pew Research Center has found that eight-in-ten Americans have been proven effecting in spreading information and awareness for varying public issues.

Whether this is due to physical, mental, or financial constraints, internet activism may be the most accessible and comfortable for disabled people. If able to attend a physical protest, the inaccessibility of public spaces is often too large of a roadblock to participation.

==== Performative activism ====
Similar to slacktivism, performative activism refers to the action of acting as if one is an advocate or activist – often on social media – for personal gain. This term is used as a negative term towards those who seem to be untruthful or exaggerating their activism work. Performative activism became frequently used after the 2020 BLM protests, this term started to become widely used as many took to social media to participate in the Black Lives Matter movement. The intentions of a lot of new activists and allies were questioned. On June 2, 2021, the social media platform, Instagram, was flooded with millions of the same image. These images were black squares under the hashtag, #BlackoutTuesday. The purpose of this online protest was to amplify Black voices on social media. However, many criticized this protest, arguing that the protest had the opposite effect as the squares flooded the important #BlackLivesMatter hashtag. People started to accuse those who participated in Blackout Tuesday, but did not do anything else in regards to the Black Lives Matter movement, of being performative activists.

=== State repression ===
In Net Delusion, author Evgeny Morozov argues against cyberutopianism. He describes how the Internet is successfully used against activists and for the sake of state repression. China presents a good example of this. Internet censorship in China has often been used as a way to achieve political stability of the Chinese Communist Party. The most well known example of internet censorship in China is the COVID-19 virus when China suppressed any information regarding the virus. Information was able to get out though because of Dr. Li Wenliang, but was considered to be falsified.

== See also ==
- Internet vigilantism – Vigilante activities carried out through the Internet
- openPetition – Free and non-profit online petition platform
- Online social movement – Type of activism
- User revolt – Type of website-based social conflict
- 4 AM club – Conspiracy theory regarding 2024 U.S. presidential election
