= 4 AM =

4 AM may refer to:

- a time in the 12-hour clock

== Music ==
- 4 AM (band), a Dutch boy band
- "4 AM" (2 Chainz song), 2017
- "4 AM" (Cherry Ghost song), 2007
- "4 AM" (Melanie Fiona song), 2011
- "4am" (Our Lady Peace song), 1997
- "4 AM" (Scooter song), 2012
- "4 AM", a song by Levellers from the 1995 album Zeitgeist
- "4 AM", a 2008 single by Kaskade
- "4 AM", a song by Suggs from the 1995 album The Lone Ranger
- "4 AM", a song by Madness from the 1999 album Wonderful
- "4 AM", a 2014 single by Antemasque
- "4 AM", a song by Herbie Hancock from the 1980 album Mr. Hands
- "4 AM", a song by Goapele from the 2005 album Change It All
- "4 Am", a song by Hail Mary Mallon from the 2014 album Bestiary
- "4AM", a song by Bastille from the 2019 album Doom Days
- "4am", a 2018 song by Girl in Red
- "4am", a song by Sault from the 2022 album Aiir
- "4Æm", a song by Grimes from the 2020 album Miss Anthropocene
- "4am And I Can't Sleep (Until I Hear The Music)", a song by Tim Scott from the 2003 album Bald on the Inside

== Other uses ==
- 4 a.m. (novel), by Nina de la Mer, 2011
- 4AM (AM), a radio station in Mareeba, Queensland, Australia

== See also ==
- "4:AM Forever", a 2007 song by Lostprophets
- "4 in the Morning", a 2006 song by Gwen Stefani
- 4 O'Clock, a 2008 EP by Emilie Autumn
- "It's Four in the Morning", song by Faron Young
- 4 AM club, activist movement
