= David Shama =

Swiss photographer and director (born 1977)

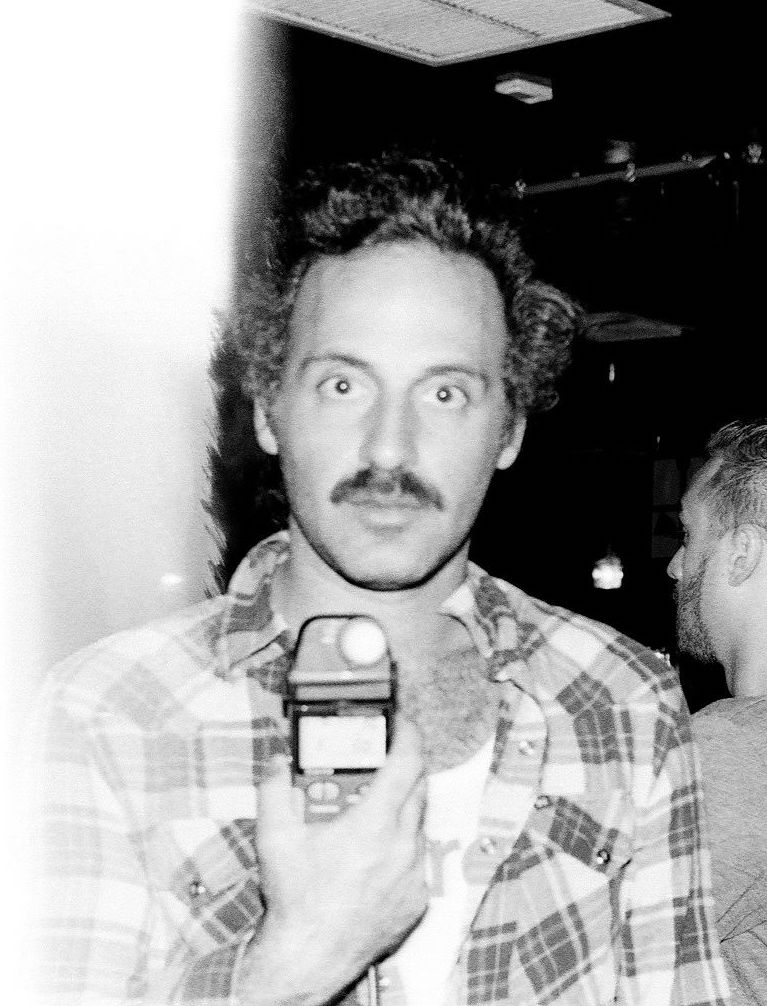
- Born: February 3, 1977 (age 49); Lausanne, Switzerland
- Occupations: Photographer, director
- Agent: Nobile Milan
- Style: Fashion, editorial, portraiture, documentary
- Website: davidshama.com

David Shama (born February 3, 1977) is a Swiss photographer and director based in New York City. He works across fashion, beauty, editorial, and portrait photography, and has been described as combining documentary approaches with narrative portraiture and cinematic style.

Shama is the author of the photobook Do Not Feed Alligators (Damiani, 2018), a long-form project developed through travel and portrait photography in the United States.

In 2022, he founded Do Not Feed Alligators, a coffee shop and bookstore concept in New York City's West Village.

The photobook and its publication have been covered by outlets including Office Magazine, L'Oeil de la Photographie, and AnOther. The coffee shop has been reviewed and profiled by New York publications and has hosted brand pop-ups and collaborations, including events with DKNY and Cynthia Rowley.

== Early life ==
Shama was born and raised in Lausanne, Switzerland. He attended L’École Nouvelle in Lausanne and later studied at the University of Lausanne.

== Career ==
Shama began taking photographs in 2005 and moved to Buenos Aires the same year, where he pursued photography while working and taking classes. He later worked as a photography assistant in Argentina before relocating to Paris in 2008 and establishing his career in fashion and editorial photography.

His editorial work has been credited in magazines including, Vogue, Dazed, Tank, Nylon, Wonderland, Intersection, Glamour (Germany), S Magazine, The Travel Almanac, Mirage and Flaunt among others.

In advertising and brand commissions, Shama has photographed campaigns for American Apparel, Les Copains, and Loops Beauty, among other beauty, fashion and sportswear clients.

Shama has also been credited for directing the Kobe 9 campaign for Nike featuring Kobe Bryant in 2013.

Shama has presented and signed his book Do Not Feed Alligators at events including Paris Photo, AIPAD in New York and at Photo Élysée (formerly Musée de l'Élysée).

== Style ==
Shama’s work has been described as situated between fashion photography and photojournalism, with an emphasis on naturalistic scenes, narrative sequencing, and portraiture.

Profiles of his practice have highlighted natural light, graphic composition, and an approach that combines candid observation with directed performance, particularly in fashion and beauty contexts.

His work alternates between spontaneous snapshots and carefully planned situations that retain the appearance of everyday realism, with recurring use of travel narratives and episodic storytelling.

== Portraiture ==
Alongside fashion assignments, Shama is known for editorial portraiture, particularly in magazine features that emphasize candid staging and character-driven storytelling. His portrait work has included musicians and actors such as Lil Wayne, Kurt Vile, and Miles Teller, as well as Margaret Qualley, Adrian Grenier, and Omar Sy.

== Books ==
- Do Not Feed Alligators (Damiani, 2018)

== Publications ==
Selected credited publications:

- Style Magazine (Corriere della Sera), March 2022, “Mimetizzarsi a Soho” (produced by Luca Roscini)
- Intersection (France), June 2018, “Real Kidz”
- Intersection Germany, August 2017, “L.A. Confidential”
- Wonderland, February 2017, “L.E.S GIRL”
- Dazed Digital, 2016, “Follow a young ménage à trois on a Cali road trip”
- The Travel Almanac, Spring/Summer 2016, “Moments with Hayden Dunham & Alice Cohen”
- Glamour Germany, October 2015, “Le Geek c’est Chic”
- Vogue, July 2015, “The Catsuit Makes a Comeback: How to Wear the Unitard”
- L'Officiel (Suisse) - Cover Story - "Printemps Étincelant"
- Nylon Guys, 2015, “Big Fish with Nev Schulman and Max Joseph”
- Relapse Magazine, 2014, “Reina”
- S Magazine, Spring/Summer 2014, “Duo Ex Machina”
- Mirage Magazine, 2012, “Eyes of Star”
- The Wild, 2014, “Kenzo”
- Nylon, September 2014, “The New Classic”
- Nylon, December 2013, “Top of the Class” (Miles Teller)
- Nylon, November 2013, “Wayne’s World” (Lil Wayne)
- Flaunt, Spring 2013, “Milk Shake, White Socks and Blue Ribbon Beer”
- Vandals Magazine, 2013, “David Shama”
- Wonderland, Spring 2013, “Kurt Vile”
- Wonderland, September 2012, “Bump the Night”
- Dazed, 2012, profile/interview
- Tank, credited editorial work (example feature on Shama’s site)

== Commissioned work ==
Selected commissioned work:

- Penti, “Inspired by flora” campaign (2025)
- Les Copains, Fall 2023 campaign (photographer)
- Loops Beauty (Loops), 2019 campaign (photographer/director)
- Los Angeles Apparel, collaboration (ongoing)
- American Apparel, Fall 2014 campaign (photographer)
- American Apparel, Fall 2013 campaign (photographer)
- Nike, “Kobe 9 Shoes”, 2013 (campaign credits list Shama as photographer/director)
- Faustine Paris, Fall/Winter 2013 campaign (photographer)
- Atelier Bartavelle, campaign (photographer)
- Automat Watches, campaign (2016)

== Personal projects ==
Selected personal projects include:

- Do Not Feed Alligators (2012–2017), project published as a monograph in 2018
- Anastasiia (2014), cross-country project from California to New York
- Avery (2013), Big Sur project
- Anastasiia (2013), Texas-to-California project published in S Magazine
- Athena (2013), “Swiss Alps,” published by Hiking on the Moon
- Mathilde (2013), “Les Valseuses”
- Lola (2011), road trip project shown at Fotofest, Paris

== Exhibitions ==
Shama’s work has been included in solo and group exhibitions in the United States and Europe, including presentations at brand and gallery spaces and photography events.

- David Shama, Group Show, Photo München 17, Munich, November 2017
- David Shama, Solo Show, 72andSunny, Los Angeles, April 2017
- Supernatural, Group Show, Con Artist, New York, January 2017
- Kill or be killed, Group Show, Con Artist, New York, November 2016
- Poesis, exhibition collaboration with Anthony Bannwart, Club 44, La Chaux-de-Fonds, October–November 2016
- Poesis, exhibition collaboration with Anthony Bannwart, Galerie des Éditions du Griffon, Neuchâtel, June 2016
- Poesis, exhibition collaboration with Anthony Bannwart, Laurent Marthaler Contemporary, Montreux, February 2016
- Helmut Newton, Group Show, Annenberg Space for Photography, Los Angeles, 2013

== Other ventures ==
In 2022, Shama opened Do Not Feed Alligators in Manhattan’s West Village, described as a coffee bar with book and art retail elements and a design identity connected to his photography project of the same name. The space has hosted brand pop-ups and collaborations, including events with DKNY and Cynthia Rowley.

== Coverage ==
Shama's work has received coverage in fashion, photography, and culture media. His photobook Do Not Feed Alligators has been featured in publications including Office Magazine, L'Oeil de la Photographie, and AnOther.

His coffee shop and bookstore concept Do Not Feed Alligators has been reviewed and included in New York guides by outlets such as The Infatuation and Eater, while its visual identity has been discussed in design-focused publications including Fonts In Use and Interior Design (NYCxDESIGN Awards coverage).

Eater New York included Do Not Feed Alligators in its curated “The Best Coffee Shops in New York City” list (page updated November 15, 2023; archived snapshot dated November 17, 2023).

In 2025, Fashionista published a Hamptons travel guide by Cynthia Rowley that highlighted Do Not Feed Alligators at her Montauk store.
