= Henrik Purienne =

South African photographer and film director

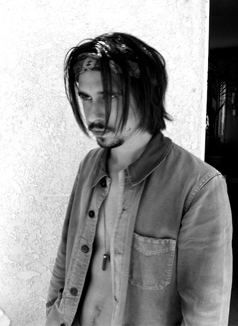
- Born: South Africa
- Occupations: Photographer, film director
- Years active: 2003–present
- Website: www.purienne.com

Henrik Purienne is a South African photographer, film director. He is based in Cape Town.

== Early life ==
Purienne was born in Worcester, South Africa.

== Work ==
Purienne began his career making documentary films.

He has created advertising campaigns and editorials for the brands Louis Vuitton, Maison Kitsuné, American Apparel, Maison Margiela, Interview Magazine, Playboy, Vogue, Lui, and Purple often featuring contemporary 'it girls' such as Sky Ferreira, Emily Ratajkowski, Camille Rowe, and Aymeline Valade.

In 2009 he launched the fashion and culture publication Mirage.

== Bibliography ==
- Purienne, Henrik (2019). Jeux de Peux. Idea Books.
- Purienne, Henrik (2021). Tasjaki. Idea Books.

== Awards ==
- 2012: D&AD Yellow Pencil, Professional Awards category, for commercial film / campaign directed by Purienne, titled 'MK is...', for South African music television channel MK
