= Imp Kerr =

Swedish-French artist

Imp Kerr (born June 6, 1980, Uppsala, Sweden) is a Swedish-French artist living in New York City, mostly known for her fake American Apparel advertisement campaign. She was The New Inquiry's creative director, and ran the blog The New Shelton Wet/Dry from 2006 until 2025.

== Early life and education ==
Kerr spent her childhood and teenage years in Paris, France. She moved to New York in 1999, where she graduated from NYU with a degree in magazine journalism and a minor in philosophy. Kerr has a sister, Rosa, who is three years older than she is.

Some bits of Kerr's life were documented on her blog "stereohell", but most of the content was taken off at the end of 2009. The same content was then reposted, in a fragmented and augmented version, on "shines like gold," an experimental blog she ran for The New Inquiry from 2012 until 2021.

== Fake American Apparel ads ==
In 2007, Kerr started a fake American Apparel ad campaign in New York, which was covered on several blogs:

"For the uninitiated, over the past few months, a NYC prankster has created several bawdy two-color parodies of AA ads complete with real ad headlines."

"The artist behind the parody American Apparel advertisements continues to operate in downtown Manhattan, where they are now modifying commercial billboards."

On September 9, 2008, a video posted on Stereohell.com revealed that the fake ads allegedly plastered throughout the city were actually Photoshop mockups, something nobody had suspected for one year.

In a final twist, American Apparel ran a tribute ad on the back cover of Vice (November, 2008), showing a compilation of the fake ads.

== Wall Street Casinos ==
In December 2008, Imp Kerr created a set of architectural drawings portraying investment banks as Las Vegas casinos.

Imp Kerr's vision was confirmed by The New York Times, in an editorial titled "Wall Street Casino," published on April 28, 2010: "Banks like Goldman turned the financial system into a casino. Like gambling, the transactions mostly just shifted money around."

The drawings were shown in the group exhibition Spacer:One at the Tribeca Grand in New York (2010) and featured in n+1 Occupy #4, April 2012.

== Media Critique ==
In the essay New Lows (2012), Kerr articulates an early critique of information saturation and accelerated communication, arguing that the overproduction and rapid circulation of knowledge tend toward banality, falsehood, and a systemic form of ignorance. The text develops these ideas through philosophical propositions, fictionalized research narratives, and reflections on media, anticipating later debates on the epistemic effects of mass media, social networks, and digital platforms. The text treats ignorance not as a lack of information but as the necessary outcome of accelerated communication, saturation, and mediation—a structural result rather than a moral failure. It is sharp in insisting that knowledge degrades not through error alone but through banality, repetition, and loss of thresholds, where speed overtakes comprehension and ordinariness overwhelms significance. Unlike earlier media theorists such as Jean Baudrillard or Guy Debord, who approached epistemic degradation primarily through cultural and critical analysis, Kerr frames the process in quasi-formal terms, presenting ignorance as the necessary outcome of the basic structure of informational growth. The essay is characterized by a cold, almost axiomatic tone that refuses critique or nostalgia and instead stages a fatalistic proof, as if epistemic collapse were a law of physics.

== DNA-based prediction of Nietzsche's voice ==
In 2015, Imp Kerr conceptualized a protocol designed to predict the voice of a deceased person (philosopher Friedrich Nietzsche in the case study) based on genotype data. To generate the voice, a vocal tract and larynx were 3D-printed. In 2020, researchers used a similar procedure to recreate the voice of a 3,000-year-old Egyptian mummy—by 3D-printing a replica of his vocal tract.

Imp Kerr study was covered and presented as real on the Canadian public radio CBC during the show As It Happens on March 20, 2015, and commented as a "piece of performance art" elsewhere. "Impressed with the scientific imaginativeness and attention to detail — the artist knows the relevant science (and has a terrific ear for the conventions of scientific communication)," wrote Jason Eisner, Professor at Johns Hopkins University.

In 2016, Kerr followed up on the Nietzsche voice project with Nietzsche’s Shadow, an artwork involving the purported collection of shadow fragments associated with Nietzsche in Èze, France, on a path (locally called “Chemin de Nietzsche”) where the philosopher regularly hiked in the 1880s. Kerr and a team of scientists allegedly gathered residue described as “electromagnetic radiation, nitrogen, and xenon,” dated to 1884–1888, which was subsequently condensed into a so-called “photonic fluid” and bottled in flasks by Imp Kerr Laboratories in Manhattan.

== Crypto Casinos ==
In 2021, Kerr revisited the “Wall Street Casinos“ concept with “Crypto Casinos,” a series of drawings depicting cryptocurrencies like Bitcoin, Ethereum, and Dogecoin as casinos in downtown Las Vegas, using the same signature red-on-white lines and tongue-in-cheek humor. The work playfully references decentralized finance, corporate sponsorships, and crypto culture in the style of her earlier Wall Street series.
