= American Apparel =

American apparel manufacturer

American Apparel, Inc.
- Type: Private
- Industry: Retail; Manufacturing
- Founded: 1989; 37 years ago
- Founder: Dov Charney
- Area served: Worldwide
- Key people: Paula Schneider (CEO)
- Products: Clothing
- Owner: Gildan
- Website: www.americanapparel.com

American Apparel Inc. is a Los Angeles-based clothing retailer founded by Canadian businessman Dov Charney in spring 1989. Previously known as a "Made in USA" vertically integrated company, following its bankruptcy and sale to Gildan, the company markets itself as "Ethically Made—Sweatshop Free," and most of its apparel is made in Honduras and Nicaragua. After its sale, Dov Charney started Los Angeles Apparel in 2016—utilizing many of the same methods as American Apparel.

== History ==
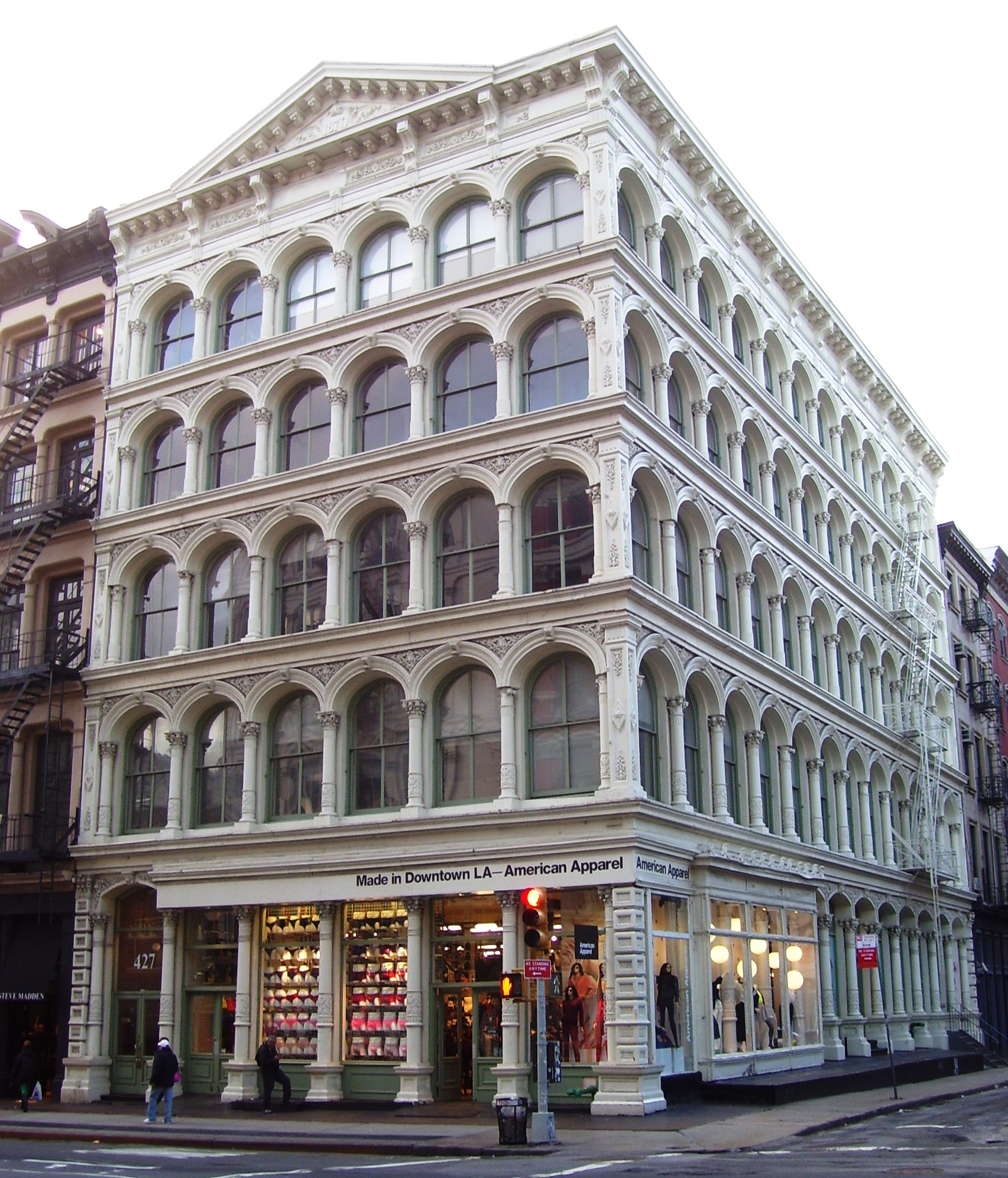
Former American Apparel store in SoHo, New York City

American Apparel was founded in 1989 by Canadian Dov Charney. For some time, clothes were made in South Carolina.

In 1997, the company moved to Los Angeles. Charney sub-contracted sewing to Sam Lim's 50-worker shop under the Interstate 10 freeway in East LA. Months later, the two became partners. In 2000, American Apparel moved into the historic Alameda Square complex in downtown Los Angeles, where it continued to grow primarily as a wholesale business, selling blank T-shirts to screenprinters, uniform companies and fashion brands. Later, the company moved into the retail market.

In 2005, the company was ranked No. 308 in Inc.'s list of the fastest-growing U.S. companies in the United States, with a three-year growth of 440% and 2005 revenues of over US$211 million.

In late 2006, American Apparel went through a reverse merger and became listed on the American Stock Exchange.

It was also one of the few clothing companies exporting "Made in the USA" goods; in 2007, the company sold about $125 million (~$187 million in 2025) of domestically manufactured clothing outside of America.

In 2010, American Apparel's auditors, Deloitte & Touche, resigned after informing the company that its financial statements for 2009 may not have been reliable. The resignation led to investigations by U.S. Securities and Exchange Commission and the United States attorney's office for the Southern District of New York.

In April 2011, American Apparel confirmed that it had secured $14.9 million (~$21 million in 2025) by selling some 15.8 million shares of common stock at 90 cents a share to a group of Canadian investors led by Michael Serruya and Delavaco Capital. The investors also received warrants to buy as much as 27.4 million additional shares. In April 2013, American Apparel issued a private offering of $206 million (~$280 million in 2025) in senior secured notes. The proceeds were used to repay a long-standing, high-interest credit facility from Lion Capital and Crystal Financial.

American Apparel was criticized in October 2013 for a "culturally insensitive display" in one of its New York stores. The display used imagery associated with Traditional African religion and Afro-American religion. This sparked outrage among some practitioners of these various religions, that include Haitian Vodou, Louisiana Voodoo, West African Vodun, Cuban Santería, and others.

In June 2014, the company's board of directors ousted American Apparel founder, chairman and CEO, Dov Charney, after allegations of misconduct and inappropriate behaviour towards employees. As interim chief executive during the search for a permanent CEO, the company's CFO John Luttrell was appointed. As co-chairmen, the company appointed Allan Mayer and David Danziger. Charney, through his lawyers, claimed his ousting was illegal and demanded reinstatement. Soon after, Lion Capital, a key lender to American Apparel, demanded the repayment of a $10 million loan four years early. A failure to repay the loan would trigger a default on a $50 million credit line with Capital One Financial.

In December 2014, American Apparel replaced CEO Dov Charney with fashion executive Paula Schneider.

=== Bankruptcy ===
By September 2015, American Apparel struggled to avoid bankruptcy, as the company needed to repay a debt of $15.4 million (~$20.4 million in 2025) due the following month. It struggled to find funds and prepared to report lighter financial results in the coming weeks.

The clothes retailer warned investors in August 2015 that it would not have enough cash to "sustain operations for the next twelve months" which raised "substantial doubt that we may be able to continue as a going concern". The firm filed for Chapter 11 bankruptcy on October 5, 2015. In January 2016, the company rejected a $300 million (~$394 million in 2025) takeover bid from Hagan Capital Group and Silver Creek, two investment firms aligned with Dov Charney.

In January 2017, American Apparel was acquired for $88 million (~$114 million in 2025) by the Canadian sportswear manufacturer Gildan Activewear.

== Branding and advertising ==
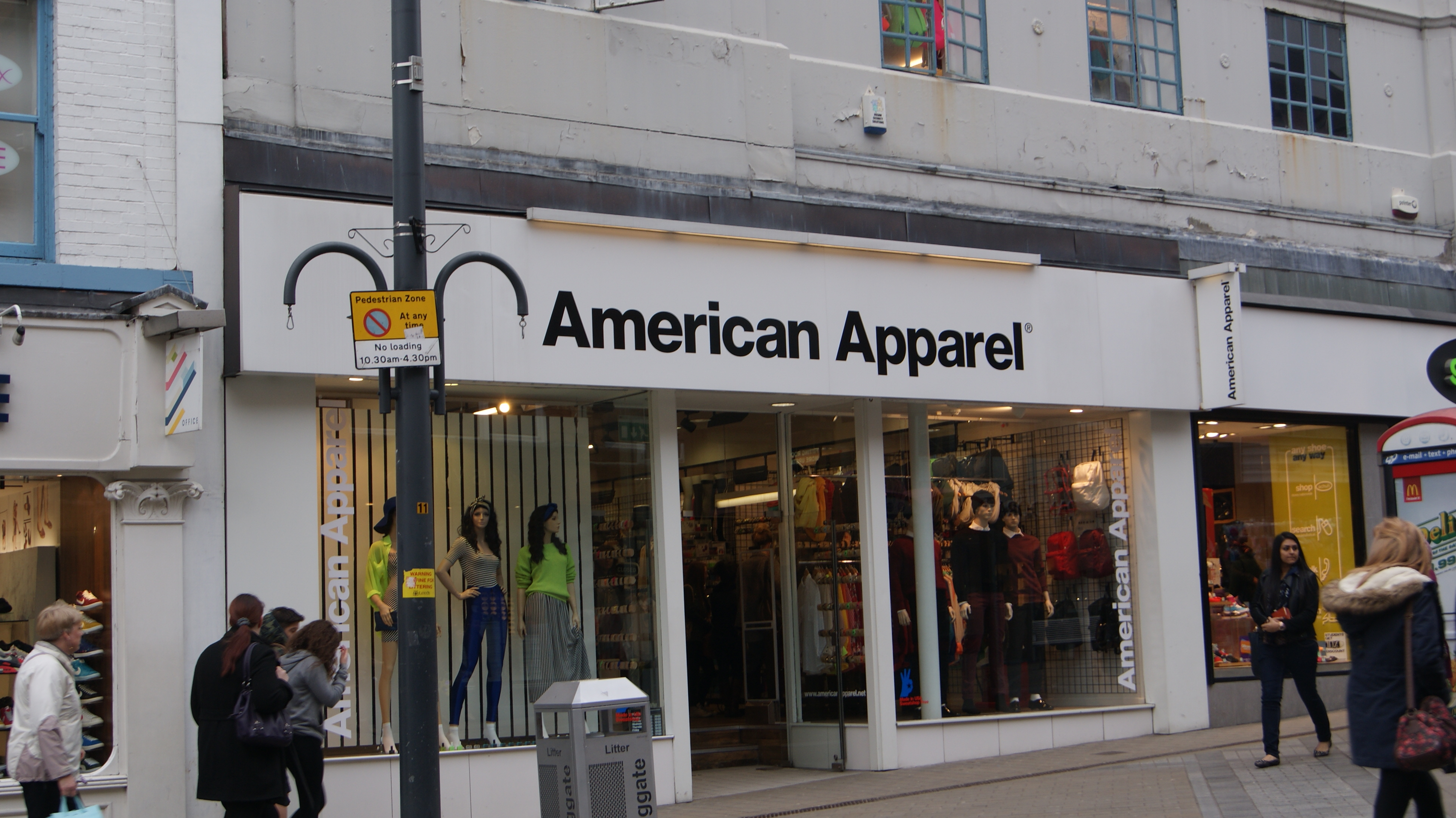
American Apparel branch on Briggate in Leeds.

American Apparel designs, creates and prints its own advertisements. The company is known for its provocative and controversial advertising campaigns, which is largely the inspiration of the company CEO Dov Charney. According to Ad Age, American Apparel's advertising "telegraphs the brand" from person to person. The sexually charged advertising has been criticized, but has also been lauded for honesty and lack of airbrushing.

According to CEO Dov Charney, the vision for the brand is that of a "heritage brand. It's like liberty, property, pursuit of happiness for every man worldwide. That's my America." In regards to the company's image overseas, advisor Harry Parnass stated that the brand is about aspiration and that they are "selling the American dream."

American Apparel images often display subjects with their blemishes, imperfections and asymmetrical features highlighted and attached with brief, personal descriptions. Many of the models in American Apparel's advertising are recruited by Charney and his colleagues on the street, or company stores; others are selected after sending their photos directly to the company website.

The company has also used pornographic actors and glamour models in some of its ads including Lauren Phoenix, Charlotte Stokely, Sasha Grey, Euguenia Diyordiychuk and Faye Reagan. Adult entertainment trade magazine Adult Video News cited the American Apparel website as "one of the finer softcore websites going". Some of the company's other ads, which feature nudity or sexual themes, have been banned by various advertising authorities. In 2009, an American Apparel ad which appeared in VICE Magazine was banned in the UK, because the image "could be seen to sexualise a model who appears to be a child". American Apparel complied with this ruling. American Apparel also came under fire for a 2014 ad for mini-skirts, which featured a model bending over so that her underwear was prominently exposed; the ad was subsequently banned and the company reprimanded for their "potential to normalise predatory sexual behaviour". In 2013, the company released an ad in which the model lay on a bed with her feet up in the air without wearing pants. The company also released an ad in which a model posed in a series of photos focused on her crotch, in which her face was not seen. The UK Advertising Standards Authority criticized the ad for being "voyeuristic" and "vulnerable".

For a time, Charney used a branding strategy that spotlighted his treatment of workers, promoting American Apparel's goods as "sweatshop free". In 2014, the company released a controversial ad with a topless model, and the words "Made in Bangladesh" across her chest, in an effort to draw attention to the company's fair labor practices. In 2008, the company took out a series of political ads featuring the corporate logo that called current immigration laws an "apartheid system".

In 2005, the company was named "Marketer of the Year" at the first LA Fashion Awards. Women's Wear Daily published a survey in April 2007 from Outlaw Consulting, a creative research firm tracking the habits of 21- to 27-year-olds, which ranked American Apparel as the 8th most trusted brand, ahead of such clothing brands as H&M and Levi's.

In 2007, Imp Kerr created a fake American Apparel ad campaign in New York. The stunt lasted almost a year, until it was revealed that the fake ads were actually Photoshop mockups. American Apparel ran a tribute ad on the back cover of Vice magazine showing a compilation of the fake ads.

In January 2008, the Intelligence Group, a trend and market research firm, listed American Apparel as their number two Top Trendsetting Brand, behind only Nike. In 2008, The Guardian named American Apparel "Label of the Year".

From 2009 until 2014, photographers such as Henrik Purienne and David Shama worked on a number of ad campaigns for American Apparel that defined the identity of the brand.

=== Lerappa ===
Lerappa ("Apparel" spelled backwards) is a virtual private island that was commissioned by American Apparel in Second Life to emulate the company's real-world stores. The store was designed by virtual content designer Aimee Weber and was completed and opened in Second Life on June 17 of 2006. The 6,000-square-foot (560 m^{2}) two-story company store was modeled after American Apparel's Tokyo showroom, and included some of the controversial advertising campaigns on the walls around the store. The building was constructed in mostly glass and featured lighting that change when the virtual world reaches night time. Outside the store was a stage where live virtual bands can perform.

Official American Apparel clothing, along with planned new lines the company was test marketing, was purchased in virtual form for less than 266 Linden (approximately US$1) and included a discount code usable at the company's real-life online store. 20 of American Apparel's styles were offered initially, Customers could also purchase real clothing from the company website via the virtual store. Lerappa was intended as an advertising experiment more than a vehicle for electronic commerce. In its first ten days of operation it generated approximately as much revenue as a typical retail location's daily sales.

Second Life protesters (aka. Second Life Liberation Army) held a protest opposing the company's real world use of sexually suggestive imagery in advertising campaigns. In February 2007 the virtual location was attacked by "virtual terrorists" via "white balls" which purposely placed in the store to temporarily obstruct areas of the screen.

American Apparel pulled out of Second Life's virtual arena and closed virtual shop in the fourth quarter of 2007.

=== Woody Allen billboard and lawsuit ===
In 2007, American Apparel put up two billboards, one in New York and one in Los Angeles, featuring an image of Woody Allen's character dressed as a Rabbi from the movie Annie Hall and Yiddish text, for a period of one week. According to Charney, the billboards were a satire and allegory alluding to both the scene in the movie and the similar controversy experienced by both individuals. Allen strongly objected to this use of his image and sued the company for $10 million. Allen testified at a December 2008 deposition that he considered the company's advertising to be "sleazy" and "infantile".

Although the company said as early as May 2008 that the billboards were meant "strictly as social parody", there was much debate over whether American Apparel's lawyers would use Allen's personal life, namely his affair with Soon-Yi Previn as their defense at the trial. Charney claimed that these rumors were outright false and that his speech was protected by the First Amendment. In May 2009, the case was settled by American Apparel's insurance carrier for $5 million (~$7.28 million in 2025), with the insurance company paying the bulk of the settlement. The settlement was for half of Allen's initial demand. Dov Charney said that if it had been up to him, he would have continued the case and taken it to trial.

=== Legalize LA, Legalize Gay, and Pride ===
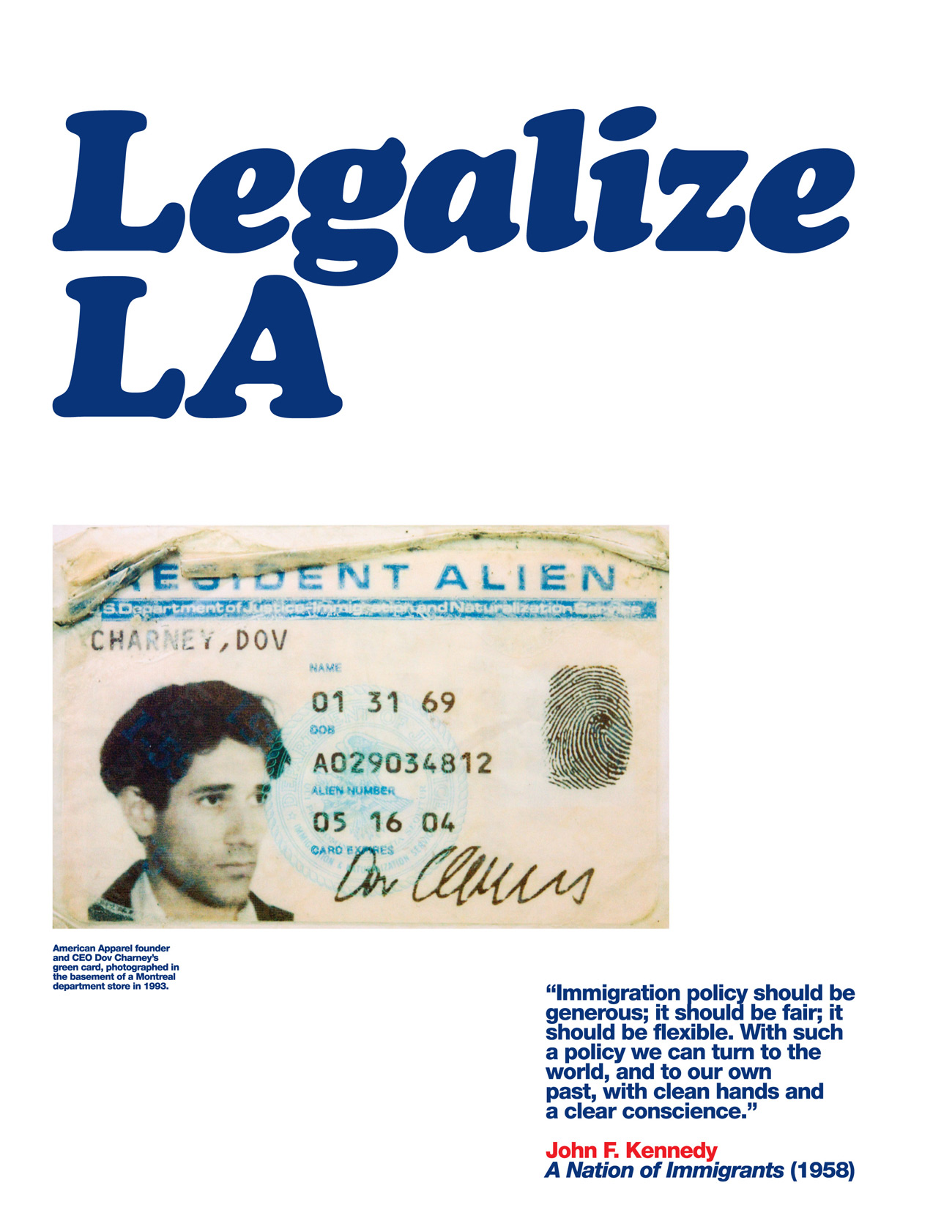
Legalize LA featuring CEO Dov Charney

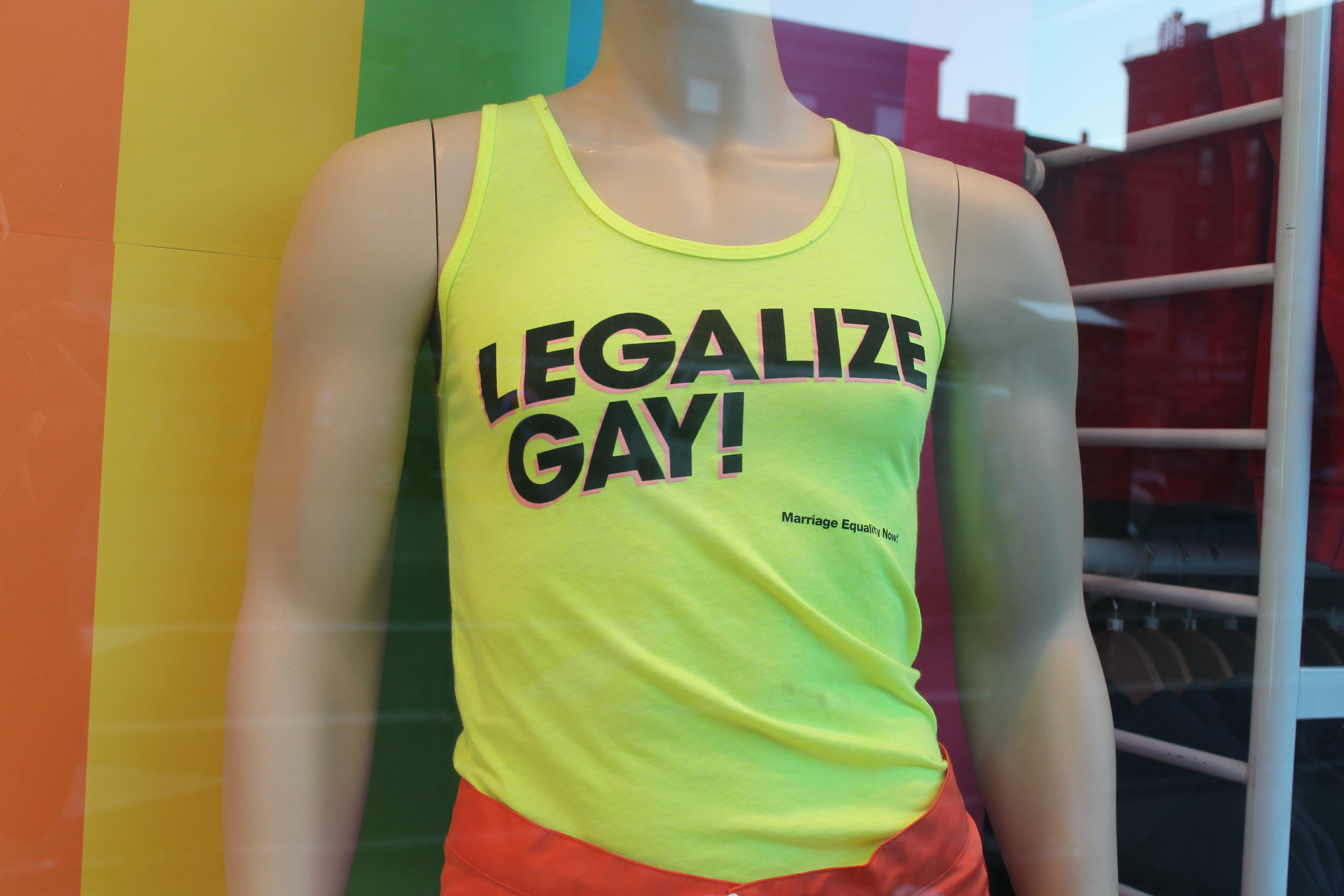
"Legalize Gay" shirt in an American Apparel window display.

In addition to participating in a variety of immigration protests, the company launched an advertising and advocacy campaign called "Legalize LA". The campaign featured advertisements in national papers like The New York Times as well as billboards, T-shirts, bus ads and posters. The company also maintains a Legalize LA portion of their website that features news articles relating to immigration reform, the brand and information on the history of the issue.

After the passing of Prop 8 (which defines marriage in the state as one man and one woman) in California in November 2008, American Apparel launched the Legalize Gay campaign. It is similar to the Legalize LA campaign, and shirts with "Legalize Gay" and "Repeal Prop 8" printed on them in the same style as the shirts of Legalize LA are sold by the company.

In June 2012, American Apparel partnered with the Gay and Lesbian Alliance Against Defamation in releasing a new line of T-shirts to celebrate LGBT Pride Month. Fifteen percent of the net sales of the shirts were donated to GLAAD. Isis King modeled for this line, becoming American Apparel's first openly transgender model. In the summer of 2013, American Apparel announced their desire for more "transexy" models.

In 2013, American Apparel was named one of TheStreet.com's "8 Pro-Gay Companies".

=== Canada ===
In a November 2010 ad running in Canadian alternative weeklies, the company describes itself as "a majority-owned Canadian company, founded and operated by Dov Charney, a Montrealer". The ad goes on to say, "In the end, one of the important things that makes American Apparel special is its Canadian heritage."

=== In pop culture ===
In 2010, Kanye West released his album My Beautiful Dark Twisted Fantasy. On this album, the song "Gorgeous" (featuring Kid Cudi and Raekwon) contained the following lyrics: "I need more drinks and less lights, and that American Apparel girl in just tights."

The 2013 Capital Cities song "Farrah Fawcett Hair", features a verse in which André 3000 lists a number of things he appreciates, ending with "getting tucked in every night for a month by the American Apparel ad girls". This song became the source for a parody by Willam Belli, Courtney Act, and Alaska Thunderfuck 5000 titled "American Apparel Ad Girls".

In February 2014, the band 5 Seconds of Summer released their hit single "She Looks So Perfect", which included the following lyrics: "You look so perfect standing there in my American Apparel underwear."

== Corporate culture and employment ==
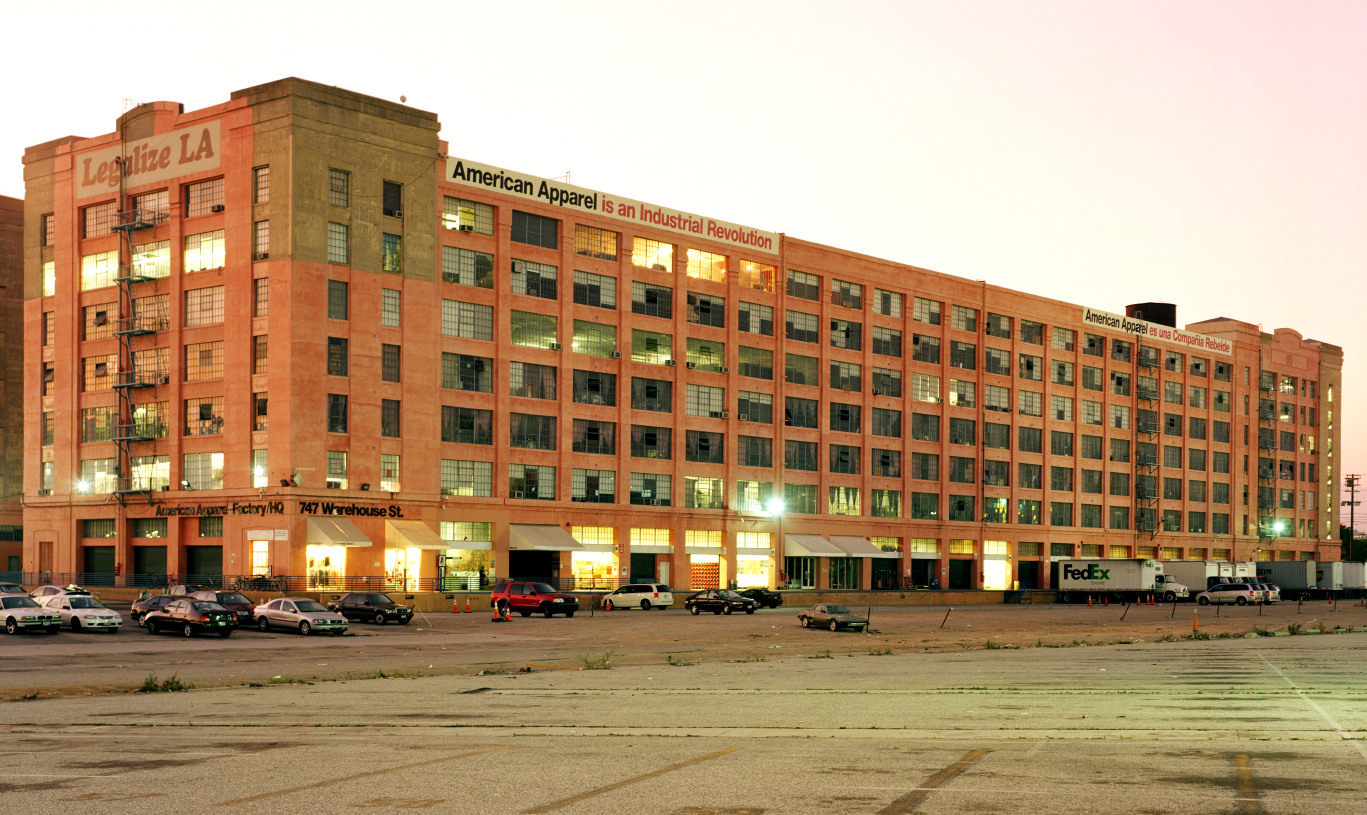
Outside shot of the American Apparel LA factory.

The production system of American Apparel centralizes most of its employees in a single location. By not outsourcing, founder and former CEO Dov Charney believed that he knew his workers better and that it tied them directly to the brand. A banner on top of the downtown factory states "American Apparel is an Industrial Revolution."

Charney had also previously stated that American Apparel hired its creatives by their sense of culture and fashion, not their resume. Conversely, the company has also been accused of focusing on personal style and outward appearance in its hiring practices for retail positions. According to Charney, the unconventional corporate culture at American Apparel was responsible for the company's creativity and rapid growth. Charney also stated that the company was open about sexuality and its culture because "young people like honesty".

The company has been criticized for its unconventional corporate culture. Charney claimed to have slept with employees, and reportedly masturbated numerous times and had oral sex performed on him by an employee during a series of interviews with a writer for the magazine Jane.

=== Production ===
American Apparel believes in making clothing through controlling almost every step in their supply chain through the process of vertical integration. Meaning that they own and operate the factories that produce the majority of their products which are sold. The company has direct control from raw materials to the finished product which allows them to ensure responsible and sustainable practices. This control over their supply chain gives American Apparel the ability to minimize their impact on the environment, offer fair wages and fair benefits.

On the occasion where American Apparel does not have the correct equipment or enough capacity, they then use contractors and suppliers for certain tasks or products. When outsourcing, they apply a comprehensive selection process to assess the contractor's ability to comply with their quality standards, labor and environmental standards, and with their Code of Conduct. The contractors must also comply with international laws such as the Worldwide Responsible Accredited Production (WRAP) and the Fair Labor Association (FLA).

=== Sexual harassment lawsuits ===
As of 2012, American Apparel has been sued in seven public sexual harassment lawsuits; all were dismissed, "thrown out", remanded to arbitration, or in one case, settled but with "no monetary liability to the company". Many cases were remanded to arbitration because the company required employees to sign away their right to any legal claim against Charney or American Apparel. In one prominent case, the company was sued by four ex-models for sexual harassment—including one separately named plaintiff who sued the company for $250 million—in a lawsuit which involved mutual nude photographs, sexual text messages and requests for money. The company was accused of being responsible for these leaks in a later lawsuit. However, the case was dismissed by a New York City judge in 2012. In another case, American Apparel was reprimanded in an opinion by the Second Appellate District for a settlement in which the plaintiff, Ms. Nelson, would agree that she had not been subjected to sexual harassment. American Apparel attempted to issue a press release which mentioned an arbitration hearing that had, in fact, never taken place due to Ms. Nelson's lawyer Keith Fink not showing up for arbitration. Keith Fink would instead later go on to represent Dov Charney in future cases, including defending against allegations of sexual harassment and assault. As of 2013, only one case, a "class action [lawsuit] on behalf of all female employees" which contains no "specific allegations against Charney," remains active. In response to the lawsuits, American Apparel has claimed that the lawsuits were extortionary attempts to "shake the company down", and has run advertisements saying so. Charney has maintained his innocence in all the lawsuits, telling CNBC that "allegations that I acted improperly at any time are completely a fiction." The board of directors voted to strip him of his position of chairman in June 2014 and fire him as CEO. Charney responded with several SLAPP lawsuits claiming defamation, which were thrown out in court.

In December 2014, Dov Charney was terminated as the company's Chief Executive Officer after months of suspension. He was replaced by Paula Schneider, president of ESP Group Ltd, company of brands like English Laundry, on January 5, 2015.

On July 1, 2025, Netflix released documentary Trainwreck: The Cult of American Apparel, revealing the working conditions at American Apparel, interviewing several past employees about the ups and downs of the company. It highlighted various aspects of working with and around Charney, including working shifts as long as 36 hours. It also shed light on the sexual harassments allegations and controversies regarding Charney and women, including minors.

=== Labor ===
As of 2008, the company employed more than 10,000 people and operated more than 200 retail locations in 20 countries. The company paid its manufacturing employees an average of $12 per hour. According to the San Francisco Chronicle the average factory worker at the company makes $80–120 per day, or roughly $500 per week compared to the $30–40 made daily at most other Los Angeles-based garment factories. Employees also receive benefits such as paid time off, health care, company-subsidized lunches, bus passes, free English as an additional language classes, on-site massage therapists, free bicycles and on-site bike mechanics, free parking in addition to the proper lighting and ventilation. Every floor of the factory includes free telephones where workers can make and receive long-distance phone calls. The company's employees in foreign countries do not receive the same hourly wages as their Los Angeles counterparts. However, employees in China will earn US Federal minimum wage. After going public, the company offered employees as much as $40 million in stock shares. The plan grants employees roughly 1 share of stock for every workday they'd spent at the company. Approximately 4,000 of the company's employees are eligible for the program. In previous years the waiting list for employment at American Apparel has had over 2,000 names on it. In 2010 the company was actively looking for staff following an investigation by US immigration found that 1,500 of its workers lacked the legal immigration documents and were subsequently dismissed.

New York Times reporter Rob Walker wrote about the controversy in his book Buying In and revealed that since the unionization drive, the company Sweat X, which was held up as the example for what American Apparel should be, had since gone out of business. He quotes Charney saying more explicitly that "[Sweat X] ... fucking failed."

The differences between American Apparel and Sweat X were the subject of the 2010 documentary No Sweat.

In 2015, the company hired the union-busting firm Cruz & Associates. The firm was paid a total of $462,343.

=== Immigration issues ===
As early as 2001, American Apparel has been a vocal advocate for reform of U.S. immigration laws. On May 1, 2002, American Apparel shut down its factory to allow the company's workers, many of whom are immigrants, to participate in a pro-immigration rally in downtown Los Angeles. Dov Charney, a Canadian, also marched alongside the workers. American Apparel participates annually in the May 1st Immigration March and Rally in downtown Los Angeles. In 2008, they added a route from their factory that eventually connected with other supporters near the city hall. The company's politics were eventually spun off into the Legalize LA advertising campaign.

In 2009, an ICE audit of American Apparel's employment records uncovered discrepancies in the documentation of about 25% of the company's workers, implying mainly that they were undocumented immigrants. American Apparel terminated the employment of about 1,500 employees that September as a result. American Apparel responded with questions of the effectiveness of such an action and said "[the firings] will not help the economy, will not make us safer. No matter how we choose to define or label them [undocumented immigrants] are hard-working, taxpaying workers." The ICE audit highlighted a new strategy from President Obama which announced they were shifting away from high-profile raids. According to CEO Dov Charney, American Apparel promised its workers who were fired for improper immigration documentation that they would be given "priority treatment, in terms of being interviewed for future positions with the company", if and when they "got [their] immigration papers in order." Commenting on the loss of 1,500 workers due to concerns over illegal immigration Charney said "It broke our efficiencies and generated a situation where we were late delivering garments. It lost us an enormous amount of money. It cost us agility."

=== Environmental policies ===
The company depends on environmentally friendly practices and is known for its innovations in sustainability due to vertical integration. American Apparel manufacturing system is designed around the concept of "Creative Reuse"—which converts excess fabric from one garment template into several additional garments such as bathing suit tops, belts, headbands, bows, bras, underwear and children's clothing. This otherwise wasted material reduces the amount of fabric the company needs to produce in addition to expanding its product line and saves approximately 30,000 pounds of cotton per week.

American Apparel maintains a bicycle lending program for its employees and according to People for the Ethical Treatment of Animals it is a vegan-friendly clothing company. As of 2007 the company planned to increase its use of organic cotton within the next four years from over 20% to 80%. American Apparel also sells a line of shirts under the "Sustainable" label that are 100% USDA organic cotton. In 2008, American Apparel purchased over 30,000 pounds of organic cotton known as B.A.S.I.C cotton.

In 2006, American Apparel installed a 146-kilowatt solar electric system on its factory roof, designed to reduce power costs by at least 20%. These panels power as much as 30% of the factory.

Apparel Group LLC, the parent company of American Apparel, has publicly reported total 2023 emissions of approximately 22.6 million kg CO₂e (Scope 1), 702,000 kg CO₂e (Scope 2), and 319.2 million kg CO₂e (Scope 3). The company has committed to achieving net-zero emissions by 2050, aligning its goals with science-based climate targets.

=== Philanthropy ===
In 2005, the company hosted a bikini car wash benefit with the American Red Cross to raise money for the victims of Hurricane Katrina. In addition, they packaged and delivered 80,000 shirts to the relief effort in New Orleans and the Gulf Coast. As an underwriter of Farm Aid, American Apparel donates the blank shirts that the organization prints and sells as merchandise. In 2007, right before Christmas, American Apparel donated more than 300,000 articles of clothing, with the giveaway specifically targeting the homeless population of large cities. In 2009, the company had a "Justice for Immigrants" factory sale in Los Angeles—the proceeds of which benefitted organizations such as the Casa Libre Immigrant Children's Homeless Youth Shelter, the Center for Human Rights and Constitutional Law, the Coalition for Humane Immigration Reform of Los Angeles, Hermandad Mexicana Latinoamericana, and the National Day Laborers Organizing Network.

American Apparel also donated more than $400,000 worth of garments to the victims of the 2010 Haiti earthquake through Fashion Delivers as well as over 5,000 pairs of socks to the shoe charity Soles4Souls.
