= Frank Rocholl =

German graphic designer

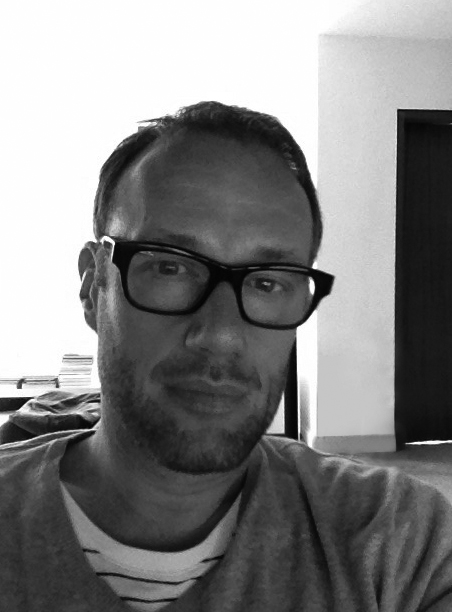
- Occupations: Art director, editor-in-chief, typographer
- Agent: Schierke Artists
- Website: www.rocholl.cc

Frank Rocholl is a German graphic designer, art director and typeface designer. He is also creative director and co-editor of the international fashion publication Mirage Magazine.

== Biography ==
Rocholl started his career as a designer in the early 1990s, when he established the design agency Landscape in Düsseldorf. From 1996 to 1997 he worked as a creative director for the design agency Meiré und Meiré.

Rocholls work has been featured in international publications about typography, logo design and graphic design.

In 2003, he presented his first font family, called Nuri, which is distributed by FontShop International.

In 2008, Rocholl and Henrik Purienne, a fashion photographer and film director from Cape Town, South Africa, established Mirage – a fashion magazine inspired by the photographic aesthetic and hedonistic culture of the 1960s and 1970s. The design language of Mirage Magazine developed by Rocholl has been presented in various print and online publications.

In 2010, Rocholl was commissioned executive Art Director for the German car culture magazine Ramp and Gapz, a travel culture magazine from the same publishing group.

In June 2013, Rocholl was responsible for the 1960s influenced Graphic Design of the Glam Rock exhibition at the Schirn Kunsthalle.

From 2013 to 2015, Rocholl has been represented by Schierke Artists.

In February 2014, Rocholl spoke at the Quo Vadis Editorial Design Conference Munich, along with Harry Peccinotti, Mario Lombardo, Mirko Borsche, Wilhelm Vosskuhl and Rolf Müller.

In 2018, Rocholl teamed up with the Greinert Family Office, major stakeholders of Duravit, to found the Maison Mirage GmbH. Business case is the licensing of retro-inspired products as an embodiment of Mirage Magazines subject matter. First product was a collection of make-up products in collaboration with Cosnova, German marketleader in decorative cosmetics, in 2020.

In 2023, Rocholl curated La Isla, a book in collaboration with British Photographer Kate Bellm, presenting Bellms underwater photography and atmospheric interpretation of her home, the balearic island Mallorca.

In 2024, Rocholl redesigned and repositioned Design Miami.

== Awards ==
- 2026 – German Design Award in Gold for Floyd - The first five years
- 2024 – Berliner Type Special Mention for Mirage No.6 Univers Parallèle
- 2023 – German Photobook Award in Silver for Mirage No.6 Univers Parallèle
- 2011 – Mercury Editorial Design Award. Category: Gold Award for Gapz Magazine
- 2006 – If Award. Category: Communication Design for the German State of Hessen
- 2002 – IdN (International Design Network Magazine) Decade Design Award. Best Graphic Design for client I-TV-T AG

== Publications ==
=== Book contributions ===
- Turning Pages, Editorial Design for printed Media (Robert Klanten, Sven Ehmann, Kitty Bolhöfer, Floyd Schulze) Die Gestalten, Berlin, 2010, ISBN 978-3-89955-314-7 Editorial Design for Mirage Magazine
- Los Logos 4 (Robert Klanten, Hendrik Heilige, Adeline Mollard, Hans Baltzer), Die Gestalten, Berlin, 2008, ISBN 978-3-89955-222-5 Logos contributed by Rocholl
- Tres Logos (Robert Klanten, Nicolas Bourquin, Thorsten Geiger), Die Gestalten, Berlin, 2006, ISBN 978-3-89955-158-7 Logos contributed by Rocholl
- Layout Workbook (Kristin Cullen), Rockport Publishers, Gloucester, 2005, ISBN 978-1-59253-158-5 Case Studies about Möller Design Folder, Area Fashion Magazine, KearneyRocholl Folder and Nuri Promotional Poster.
- 1000 Type Treatments (WilsonHarvey/Loewy), Rockport Publishers, Gloucester, 2005, ISBN 978-1-59253-159-2 Logos contributed by Rocholl
- The complete Typographer (Will Hill), New Media Typography, Quarto Publishing London 2005, ISBN 0-13-134445-5 Case study about Rocholl Website as an example for new media typography.
- Type One (Robert Klanten, Micha Mischler, Silja Bilz, Nik Thoenen), Type Essay, Die Gestalten, Berlin, 2004, ISBN 978-3-89955-056-6. 2-page essay about Font Design by Rocholl, Case Study about the Nuri Font.
- Typograph Workbook (Timothy Samara), Rockport Publishers, Gloucester, 2004 ISBN 1-59253-081-8 Case Studies about Rocholl website and Packard brand relaunch
- Idn Decade Design Awards.01.02: Kaleidoscopic Age(Systems Design Ltd), 2002 ISBN 9789628617760 Award presentation I-Tv-T Folder

=== Magazine contributions ===
- KearneyRocholl, Novum, the world of graphic design, New Media Magazine Publishing, Munich, 06/2005, 5-page case study about Rocholl Type and Logo Design by Herbert Lechner
- Remixed compilations, PAGE, Magazine for digital design and mediaproduction, Macup Publishing, Hamburg, 04/2005, 3-page essay by Rocholl about the artist Tom Sachs
- Leihgaben, PAGE, Magazine for digital design and mediaproduction, Macup Publishing, Hamburg, 12/2004, 1-page case study about KearneyRocholl Broschure Design
- Nu kid in town, PAGE, Magazine for digital design and mediaproduction, Macup Publishing, Hamburg, 09/2003, 4-page Case Study about the Nuri Typeface by Antje Dohmann
- Helvetica returns, PAGE, Magazine for digital design and mediaproduction, Macup Publishing, Hamburg, 11/2001, 1-page essay by Rocholl for the Type Directors Club
- Identity work, Novum, the world of graphic design, New Media Magazine Publishing, Munich, 01/2001, 6-page case study about Rocholl Logo and Broschure Design by Herbert Lechner.
