= Legalize LA =

Activist campaign promoting amnesty for illegal immigrants

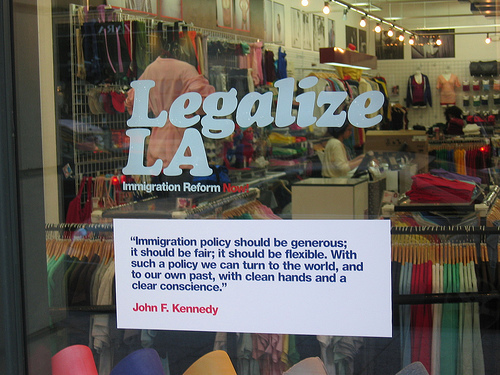

Legalize LA was an activist campaign promoting amnesty for illegal immigrants, propagated through billboards, protests, clothing, advertisements, educational pamphlets, and grass roots support, underwritten by American Apparel. Originating locally in Downtown Los Angeles, the company took the campaign national in early 2008.

== Campaign ==
Legalize LA was billed as an education and media advertising campaign. According to Dov Charney, Legalize LA was an open alternative to private lobbying. Charney also stated that the cause is part of the core of the company. Choosing to advertise social causes not directly related to the fashion company's product has drawn comparisons to campaigns done by advertisers like United Colors of Benetton and Nike.

American Apparel released a line of T-shirts featuring the words "Legalize LA" that were sold in its retail locations. The company donates the proceeds of the shirts to Los Angeles-based immigration rights groups. Legalize LA participated in the May Day protests in 2008. American Apparel employees were given the day off work to participate.

The company also maintained a Legalize LA portion of their website that featured news articles relating to immigration reform, the brand and information on the history of the issue.

=== Ads ===
Legalize LA ran advertisements that pushed for the legalization of the country's illegal alien workers in the New York Times and Los Angeles Times. The ads appeared in both Spanish and English.

One ad featured a quote from President George W. Bush expressing the need for immigration reform and asked why nothing had been done. It ended with the words "It's time to Legalize LA and the USA." Ads have also implied that the current laws constitute an "apartheid." Another campaign used an excerpt from John F. Kennedy's essay, A Nation of Immigrants.

The company also put up billboards, bus stop ads and posters throughout Los Angeles. They also placed two large banners across their downtown factory that read "Legalize LA" and "Immigration Reform Now!"

== Reception ==
The company's message was later endorsed by California Assembly Speaker Fabian Nuñez, according to the Los Angeles Times. He gave a speech denouncing ICE's raids on "nonexploitive" companies underneath the Legalize LA banner at the downtown Los Angeles factory alongside company executives.

One group responded by picketing the company's store in Pasadena, California with signs that said "Legalize LA: Deport Immigrants". A group called Save Our State uploaded a series of protest videos on YouTube renaming "Legalize LA" as "Amnesty for Illegal Aliens." The videos feature the group picketing outside of the company's Hollywood store. American Apparel also received hate mail regarding the campaign which they subsequently posted online. Angered by the company's politics, a group launched a website called BoycottAmericanApparel.com that gave away stickers to participants.

The campaign also inspired Vice Magazine to release a video documentary called Illegal LA - Immigration, Deportation, and the Right to Work that featured Dov Charney and other immigration figures.

== Legalize Gay ==
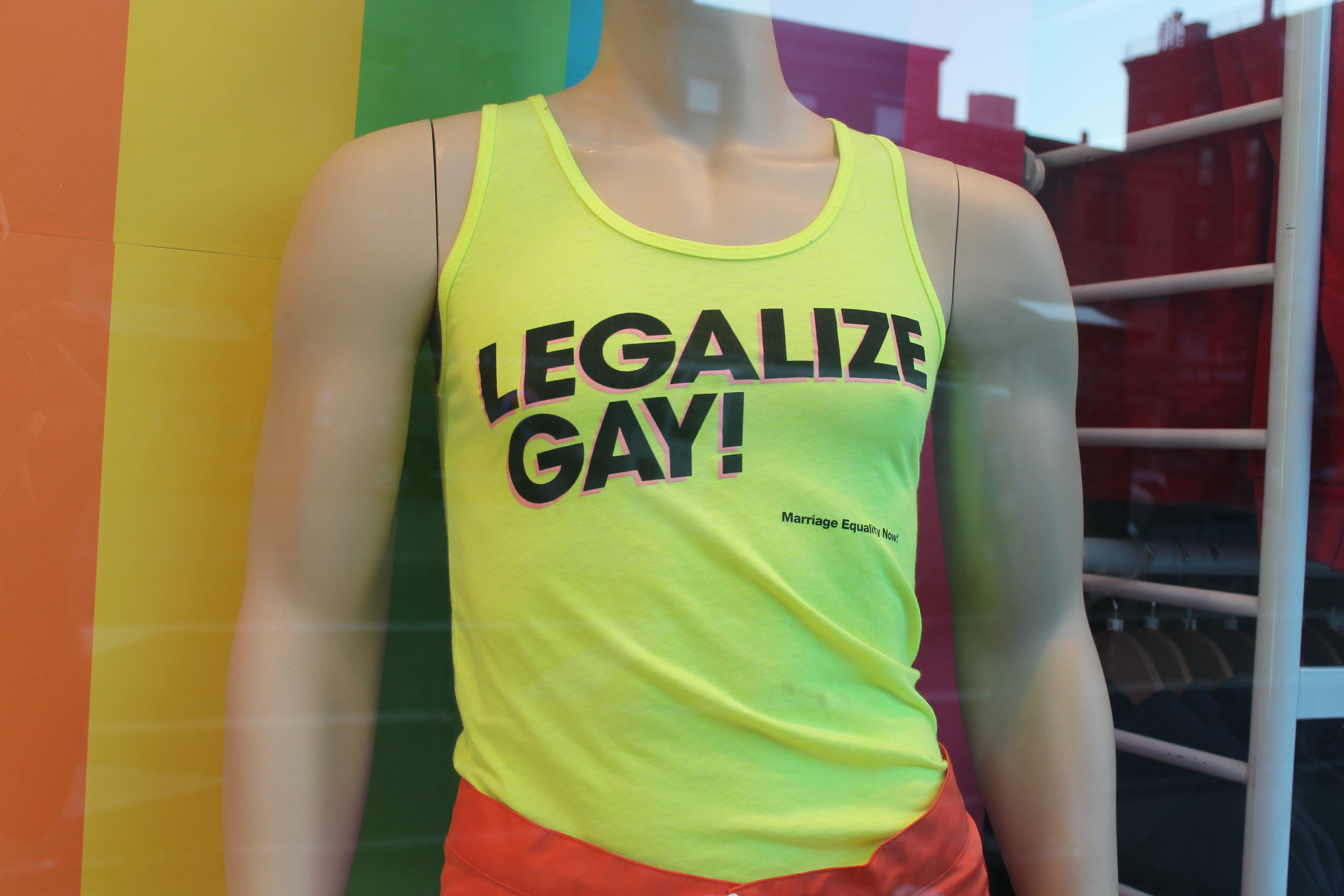
American Apparel window display

In November 2008, after the passing of Proposition 8, which banned same-sex marriages in California, American Apparel created "Legalize Gay" (a play on Legalize LA) T-shirts to hand out to protesters at rallies. The reaction was so strong, American Apparel began selling the same shirts at stores and online. On July 20, 2009, the window of an American Apparel store was broken by vandalism in response to the campaign. In the next two days, employees at the Silver Spring location as well as the Georgetown store received threatening phone calls, with the perpetrators demanding the T-shirts be taken down. American Apparel asserted the company would not take the T-shirts down and instead, insisted every store in the Washington DC area display a "Legalize Gay" shirt. The company also offered to give the shirts to any gay rights group in DC who wanted one.

The company has also been criticized for carrying Butt Magazine, a gay culture publication, though American Apparel refuses to discontinue carrying it citing it as an "important gay culture publication" and freedom of expression.

== See also ==
- Illegal Immigration to the United States
- Illegal immigration
- Immigration
- Media activism
