= Mirage (magazine) =

French fashion magazine

Mirage Magazine
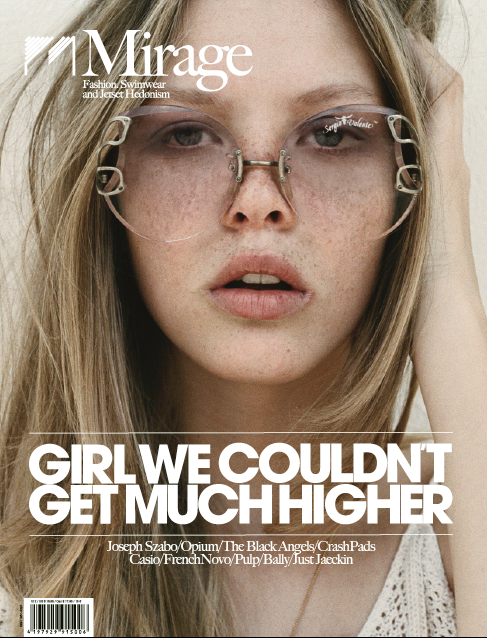
- Cover of Mirage No.2
- Editor: Henrik Purienne and Frank Rocholl
- Categories: Fashion, Art, Design, Architecture, Culture
- Frequency: Annual
- Founded: 2009
- Country: France
- Based in: Paris
- Language: English
- Website: http://www.miragemag.com
- ISSN: 1867-402X

Mirage Magazine is an international fashion and culture magazine headquartered in Paris, France. It was founded in 2009.

== Background ==
Mirage, founded in 2009 by Henrik Purienne and Frank Rocholl, is an annual 400-page fashion and culture magazine inspired by the photographic aesthetic and hedonistic culture of the 1960s and 1970s. The magazine intends to revive and reflect upon the spirit of artists such as The Velvet Underground, The Doors, and Nick Drake. It draws and reflects upon architects like John Lautner and Paolo Soleri; designers such as Massimo Vignelli and Marcello Gandini; and fashion icons such as Lauren Hutton, Anita Pallenberg, and Betty Catroux.

== Content ==
Mirage Magazine focuses on aesthetics in architectural, automotive, and product design, combined with features about utopia like Robert Evans and Peter Saville. Its fashion stories often reflect the relationship between photographers and models, with key themes including summer, sun, youth, freedom, and rebellion. The magazine's contributor list includes Jason Lee Parry, Jonathan Leder, Matteo Montanari, Andrew Kuykendall, Ana Kras, Akila Berjaoui, and Quentin de Briey.

Mirage launched in 2009 in Colette, Paris. It then distributed globally and expanded to the US, Canada, Australia, and Great Britain markets. In June 2011, Mirage was nominated for the German Design Award, and it won a Print Star in Gold in 2013 for high printing quality.

== Awards ==
- 2024 Berlin Type Award Special Mention
- 2023 German Photobook Award in Silver
- 2013 Print Star Gold Award. Award of the German Printing Industry. Category: Best Printed Fashion Magazine
- 2011 German Design Award. Nominated by the Ministry of Economics of the German state of Hessen
- 2010 Design Award. Category: Communication Design for Mirage Magazine
