= Keith Fink =

American attorney, author, and academic

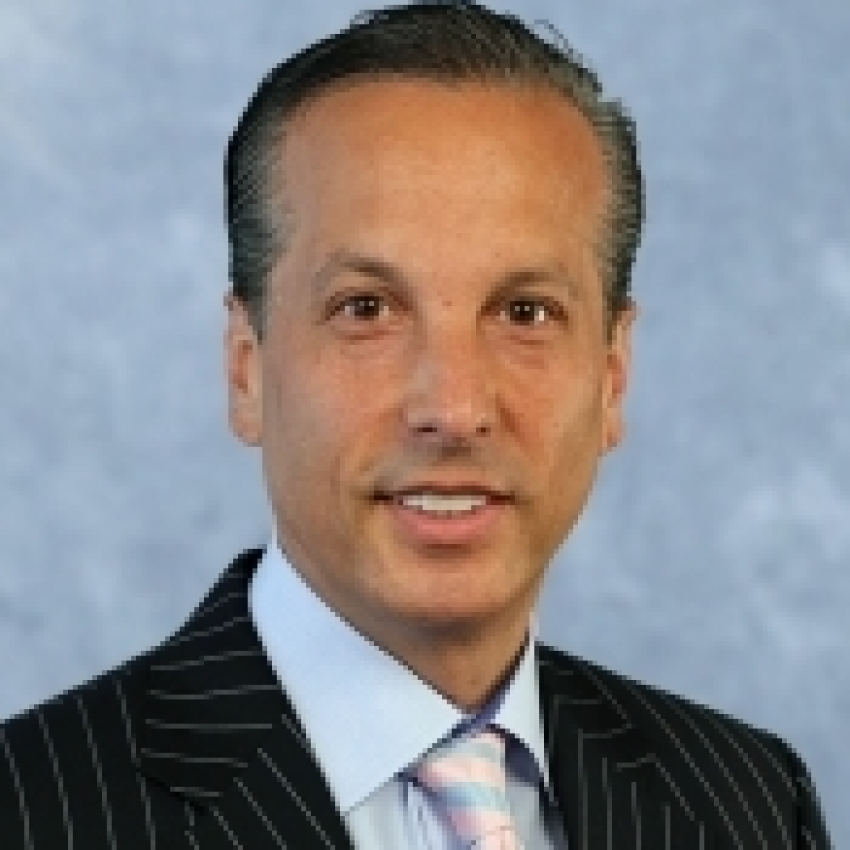
- Born: Santa Monica, California, U.S.
- Education: University of California, Los Angeles (BA); Southwestern Law School (JD)
- Occupations: Attorney, author, academic
- Website: www.finklawfirm.com

Keith Fink is an American attorney, author, and academic. He represented clients in a contract dispute with Ellen DeGeneres dubbed by the media as "Iggygate".

In 2017, Fink became embroiled in a dispute with the University of California at Los Angeles regarding the non-renewal of his contract.

Fink is the author of two books: Free Speech in the Workplace and Sex, Politics, and Race: Free Speech on Campus.

== Biography ==
Keith Fink was born in Santa Monica, California and grew up in Bel Air, California. He attended University High School and then went to college at the University of California, Los Angeles. Fink has won many debate tournaments. As juniors, Fink and his debate partner Lisa Allred set the single season college debate record for most tournament wins in a year.

After college, Fink taught debate at the Harvard-Westlake School while also editing a college debate handbook called Fink's Files, which provided analysis and arguments on the yearly college debate topic. Fink also taught Speech at Stephen S. Wise Temple.

Fink subsequently earned a Juris Doctor degree from Southwestern Law School and was admitted to the State Bar of California.

== Legal career ==
Fink began his legal career as an associate attorney at Cotkin, Collins & Franscell. He subsequently joined Kindel & Anderson. Fink later joined Baker & Hostetler. During Fink's early years as an attorney, he successfully prosecuted numerous 42 U.S.C. § 1983 cases, leading to one that was heard by the Supreme Court of California in which Fink's client prevailed.

Fink's focus has gradually expanded to labor, employment, business, and commercial litigation. In March 1997, Fink founded Keith A. Fink & Associates, a boutique litigation firm that primarily handles employment discrimination law, labor, business, civil rights, and entertainment law matters.

== Teaching ==
Fink began teaching as an adjunct professor at Southwestern Law School in 1993. He taught Civil Rights & Civil Liberties, Labor Law, Employment Discrimination, and Pretrial Civil Practice.

In the 2007-2008 academic year, Fink stopped teaching at Southwestern Law School and began teaching at UCLA, his alma mater. For the next decade, Fink's teaching focused on the First Amendment, freedom of speech, employment law, entertainment law, and debate. Fink designed and taught four courses: Race, Sex & Politics: Free Speech on Campus; Free Speech in the Workplace; Entertainment Law; and Abortion, Gun Control, and the Death Penalty: Arguing Contemporary Social Issues.

Throughout the first half of 2017, Fink was engaged in an academic freedom dispute with UCLA administrators, leading to Laura E. Gómez (the former Dean of Social Sciences) opting not to promote him to Continuing Lecturer, effectively ending his employment with the Department of Communication Studies on June 30, 2017.
