= 4 AM club =

Conspiracy theory regarding 2024 U.S. presidential election

Kamala Harris, the subject of the conspiracy, in a 2021 official portrait

In the United States, the 4 AM club is a feminist mystical online movement, described as a conspiracy theory by certain right and center journalists. It began in the immediate aftermath of the 2024 United States presidential election. Referred to by media outlets as a left-wing version of QAnon, one of the theories proposes that Kamala Harris, the 49th Vice President of the United States, won the 2024 election and is currently serving as the 47th President of the United States in a parallel universe. In fact, the wide variety of online creators who identify as either 4AM club members or Dreaming women do not all share the same views.

Some members of the 4AM Club believe that at 4:00 AM on November 6, 2024, the universe split into two alternate realities. They believe that Kamala Harris won the 2024 United States presidential election in the "correct" universe, and that humanity needs to realize its "mistake" to "jump back" to the correct reality. The conspiracy theory is spread on social media such as TikTok and YouTube, with many proponents being self-described spiritual healers, witches, and psychics that claim to be aware of the split in reality.

== See also ==
- Attempts to overturn the 2020 United States presidential election
- Big Lie
- Conspiracy theories in the United States
- Mandela effect
- Pizzagate
