= Windbreaker =

Thin coat designed to resist wind chill and light rain

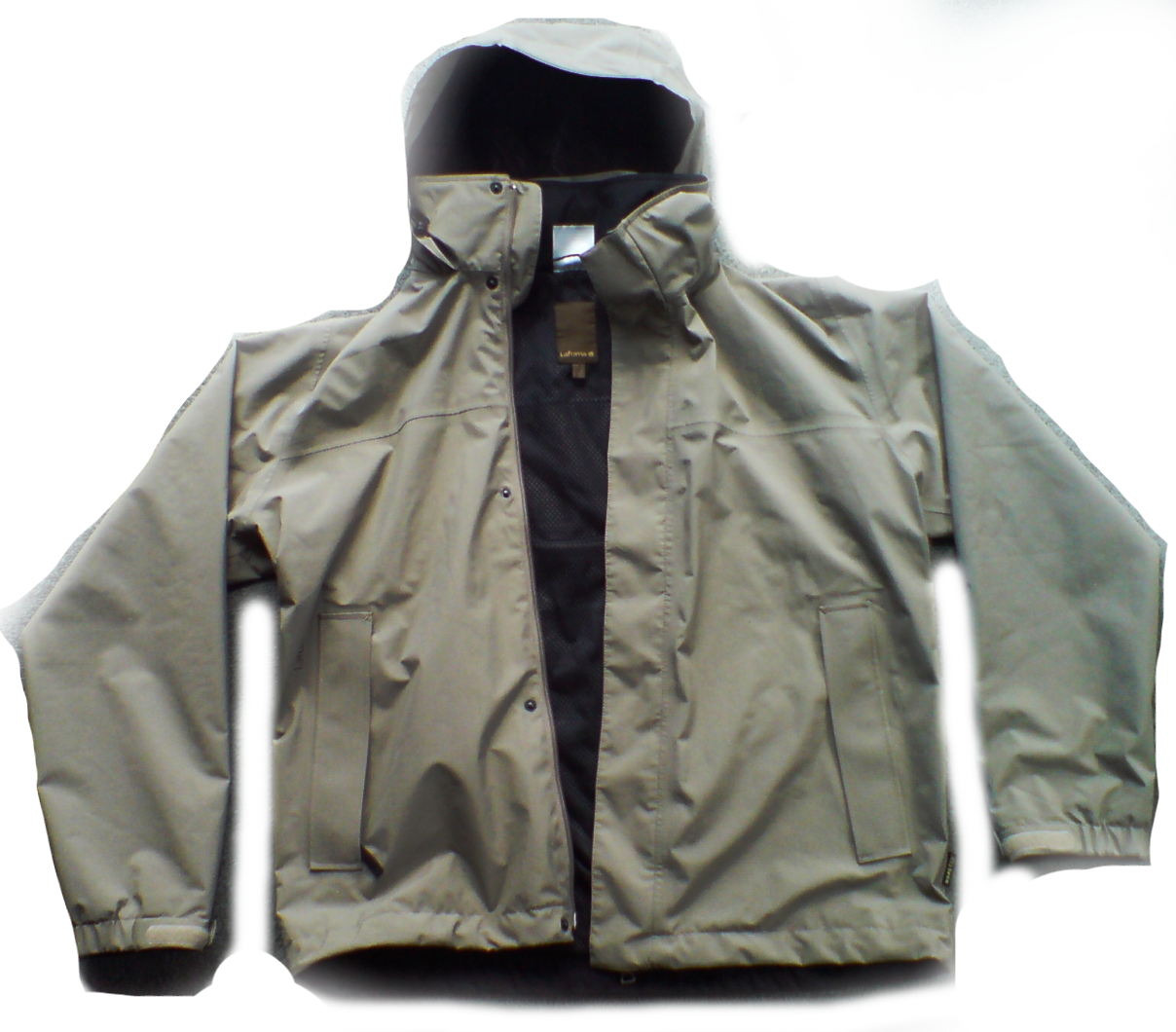
A windbreaker with its "stowable" hood unstowed

A windbreaker, or a windcheater, is a thin fabric jacket designed to resist wind chill and light rain, making it a lighter version of the jacket. It is usually lightweight in construction and characteristically made of synthetic material. A windbreaker often incorporates an elastic waistband, elastic armbands and a zipper to allow adjustment for weather conditions.

Ordinary jackets or coats may include a type of windbreaker as an interlining that can be removed when desired. Windbreakers sometimes include a hood that may be removable and/or stowable. Many windbreakers may also include large pockets on the inside or the outside which allow belongings to be protected from the weather. Windbreakers may offer light to moderate insulating protection, more so than a sweater, but less than an overcoat.

Windbreakers are primarily worn during the warmer seasons when wind or light rain are expected, or as part of a layering strategy during colder seasons. Brightly colored windbreakers may also be worn by runners as protection from the weather, and as a reflective garment used for safety. A 2012 study demonstrated that adding windbreaker pants and jackets is a lightweight but effective means of delaying hypothermia if the user is outside walking and encounters unexpected low temperatures.

== Windbreaker ==
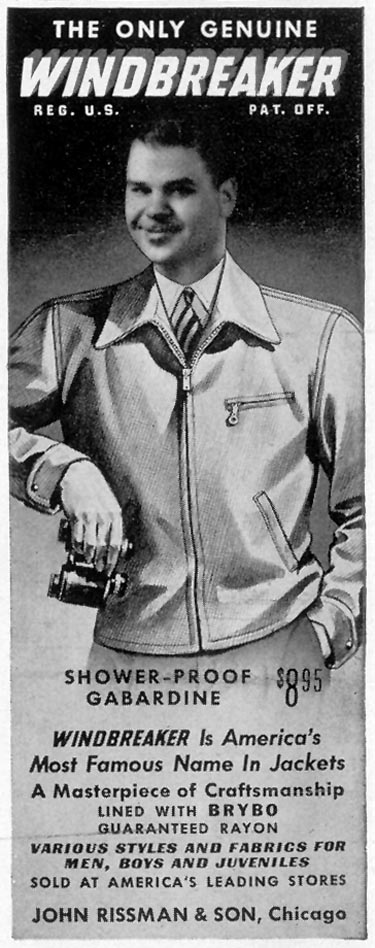
A Rissman company ad for windbreaker jackets (1942)

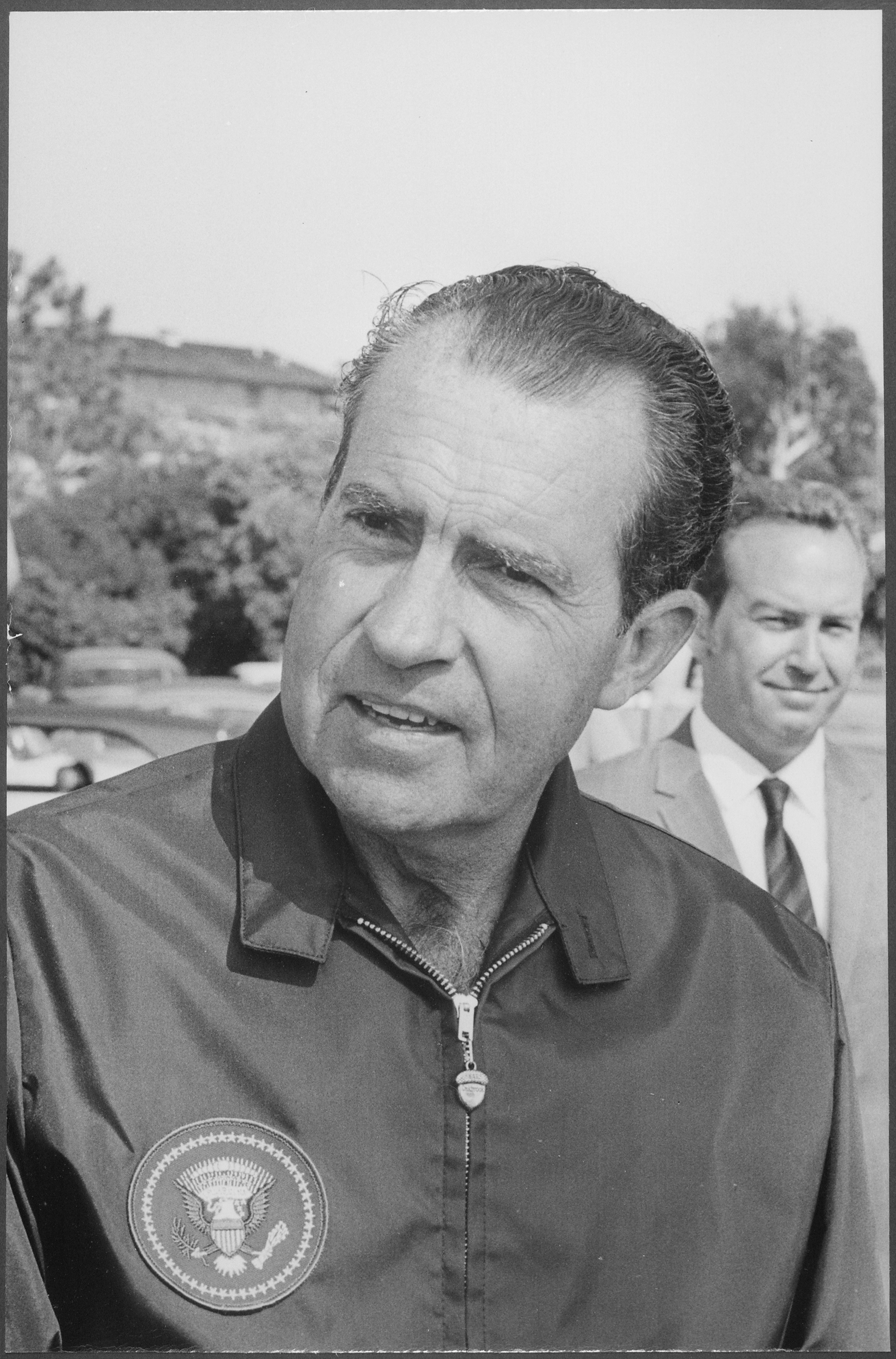
United States President Richard Nixon wearing a windbreaker on September 6, 1969.

The term was first used and trademarked by the John Rissman company of Chicago for its gabardine jackets.

Windcheater is used in the United Kingdom and certain Commonwealth countries, including Australia and India. It can also refer to any glossy synthetic material used to make clothing. Windcheater tops are also commonly known as cagoules or windbreakers in the United Kingdom.

== Windcheater ==
Windbreakers can also be called “windcheaters”. The term predates the term windbreaker and was originally used to describe a sort of garment that was more akin to a pullover anorak than a modern zippered windbreaker.

Windcheater is also used to describe a retail item used on the beach and camping to prevent wind from disturbing social enjoyment. Normally made from cotton, nylon, canvas and recycled sails, these windbreaks tend to have three or more panels held in place with poles that slide into pockets sewn into the panel (like many tents).The poles are then hammered into the ground and a windbreak is formed.

== See also ==
- Raincoat
- Hoodie
- Parka or anorak
- Cagoule
- Poncho or rain poncho
- Eisenhower jacket
- Windpants
