= Cagoule =

Lightweight, weatherproof raincoat or anorak with a hood

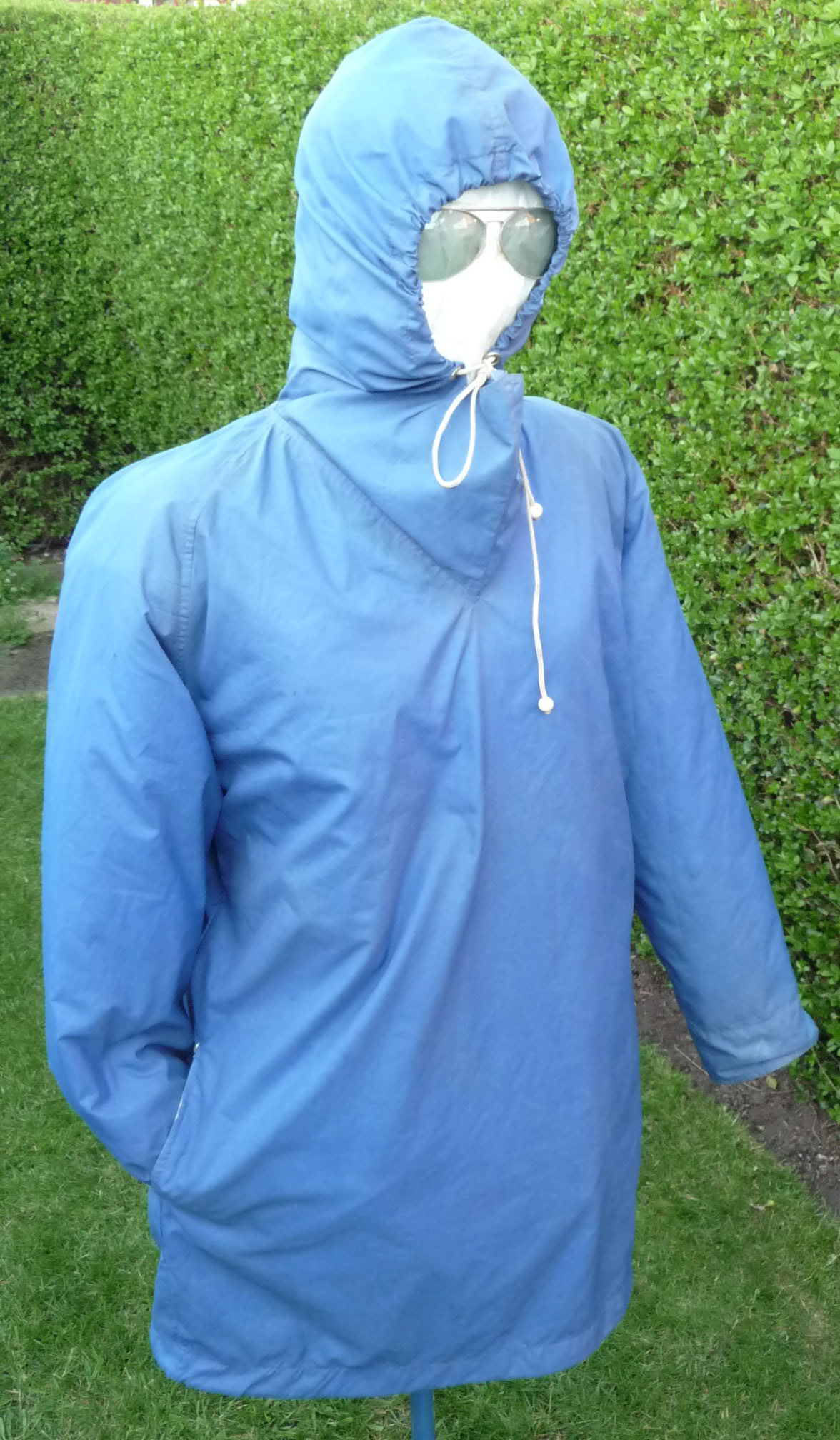
Vintage Peter Storm cagoule with zipped side-slit hand access to undergarments and extra-long sleeves with elasticated storm cuffs, modelled on a mannequin

A cagoule (French: [kaɡul], also spelled cagoul, kagoule or kagool), is the British English term for a lightweight weatherproof raincoat or anorak with a hood (usually without lining), which often comes in knee-length form. The North American English equivalent is windbreaker. The word cagoule is borrowed from the French for balaclava or hood.

In some versions, when rolled up, the hood or cross-chest front pocket doubles as a bag into which the shell can be packed.

== History and styles ==
"Anorak hails from Greenland, parka from northern Russia and cagoule, evidement (sic), is French."

A cagoule which could be rolled up into a very compact package and carried in a bag or pocket was patented by former Royal Marine Noel Bibby and launched in the UK under the brand name Peter Storm in the early 1960s.

In 1965, the French cagoule brand K-Way was introduced.

Original versions were lightweight and packable with generally an integral hood, elastic or drawstring cuffs, and a fastening at the neck. Usually, the cagoule could not open fully at the front and was pulled on over the head, to lower exposure to wind and rain.

As a functional outdoor rain-garment, the original roomy styling and proportions allowed the protection of the wearers' small personal items, such rucksack, waist bag and/or camera bag.

Later copied and marketed as a close-fitting cheap fashion accessory, the style became very popular in the United Kingdom during the 1970s.

== Gallery ==
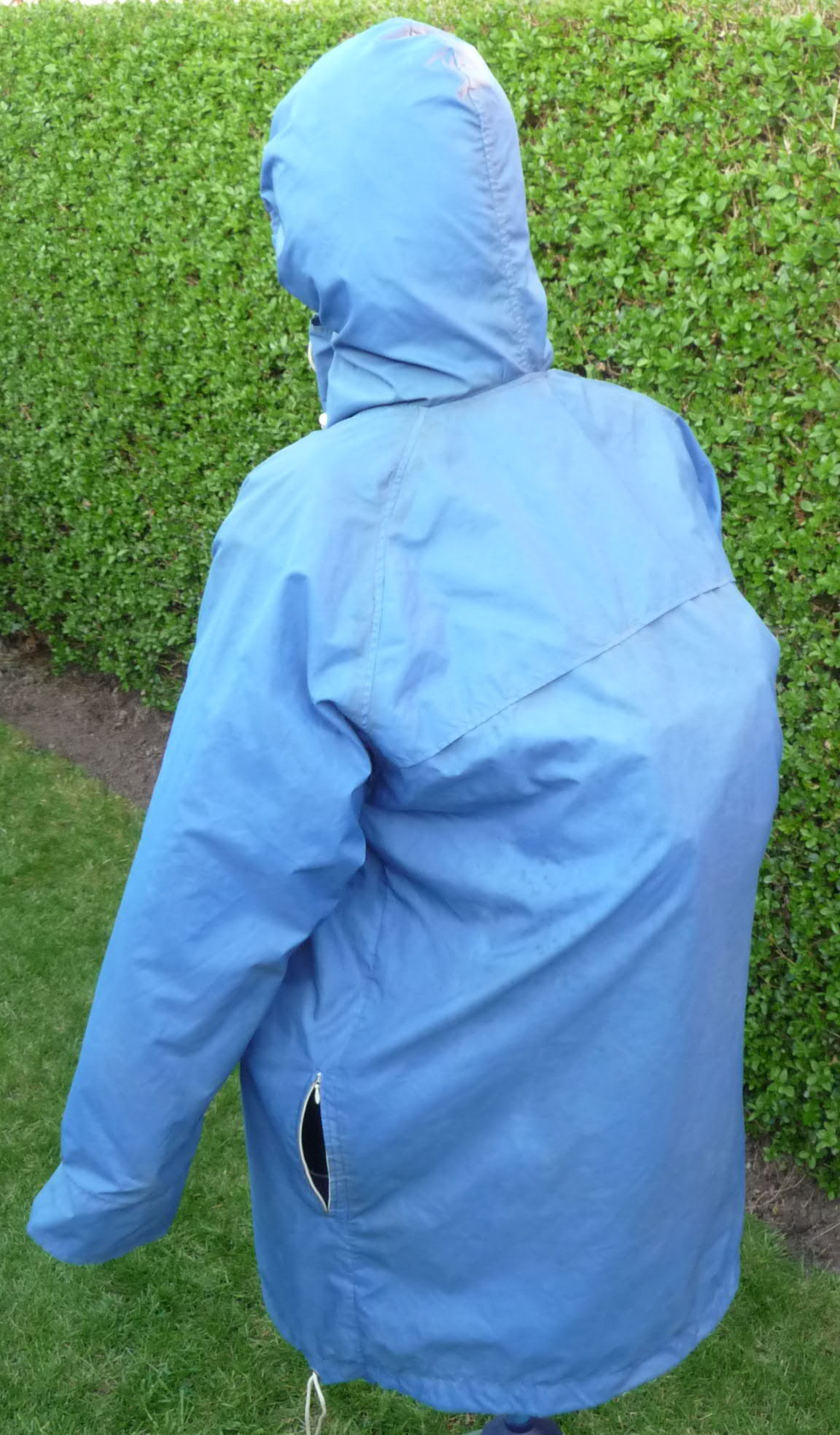
Peter Storm vintage cagoule

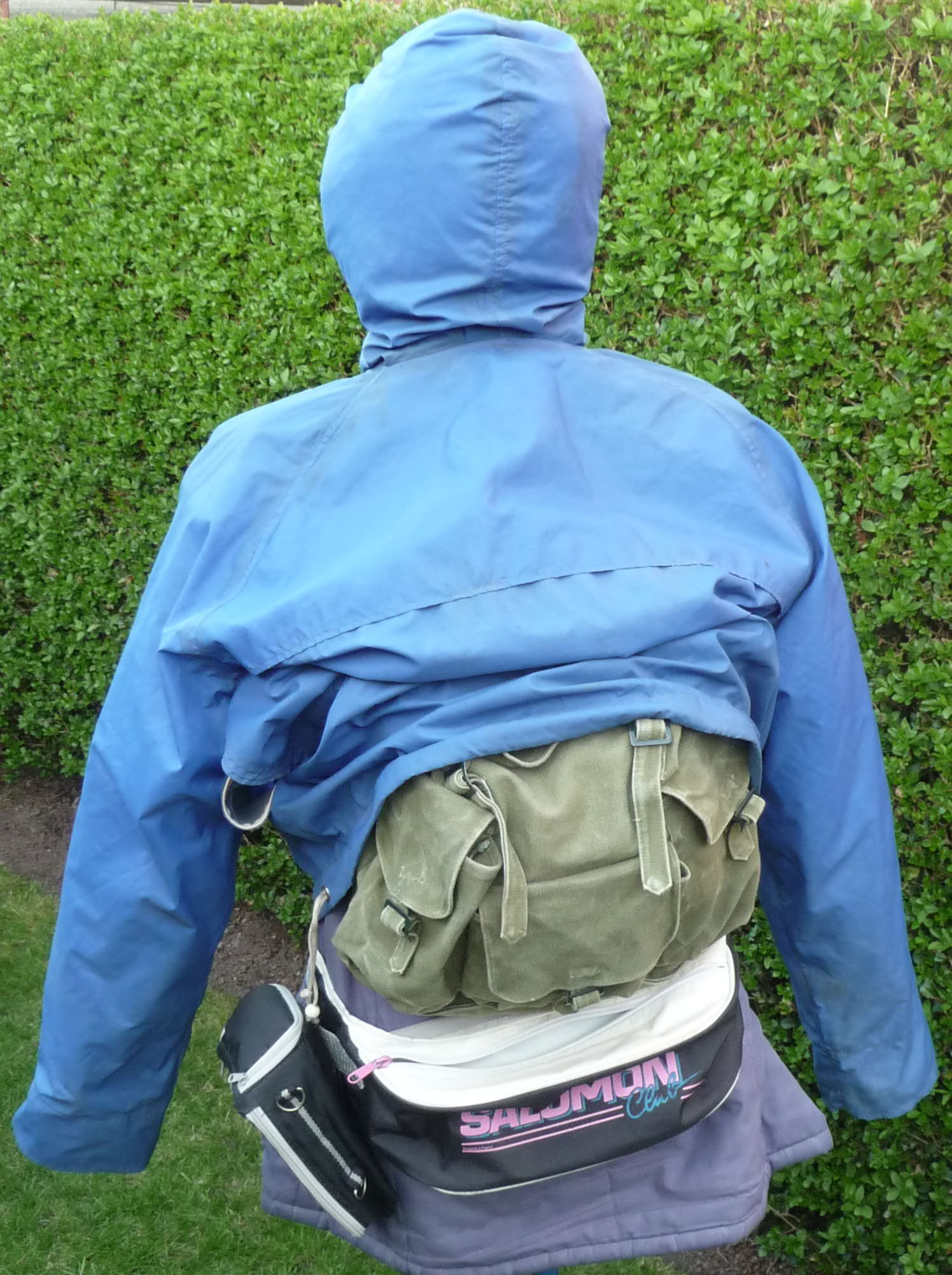
Weather protection of lightweight items of personal luggage is possible

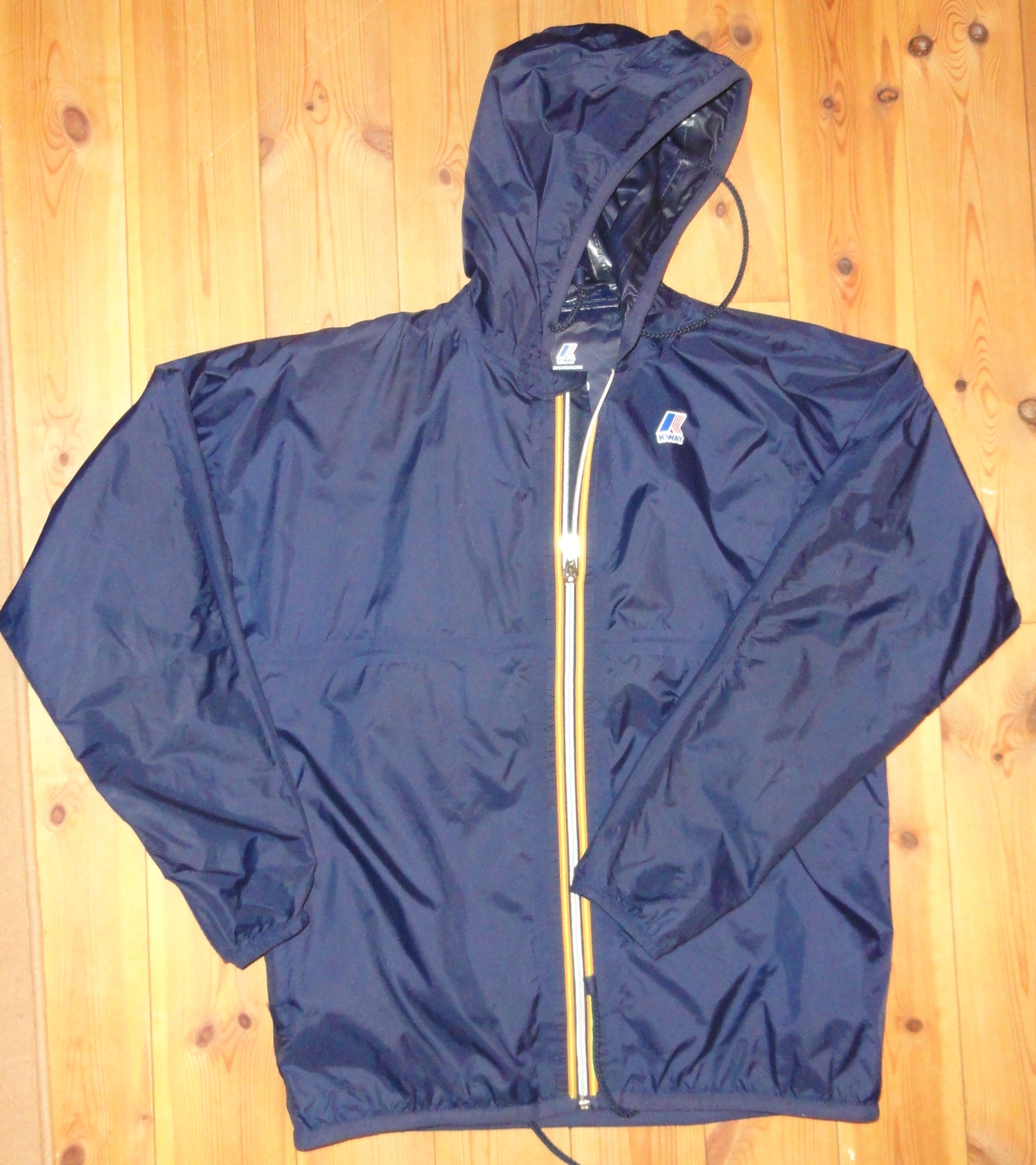
French brand "K-Way" cagoule

== See also ==
- Raincoat
- Mackintosh
- Parka or anorak
- Windbreaker or windcheater
- Gabardine
- Rain poncho
