= Anorak (slang) =

Slang term for someone with an interest in niche subjects

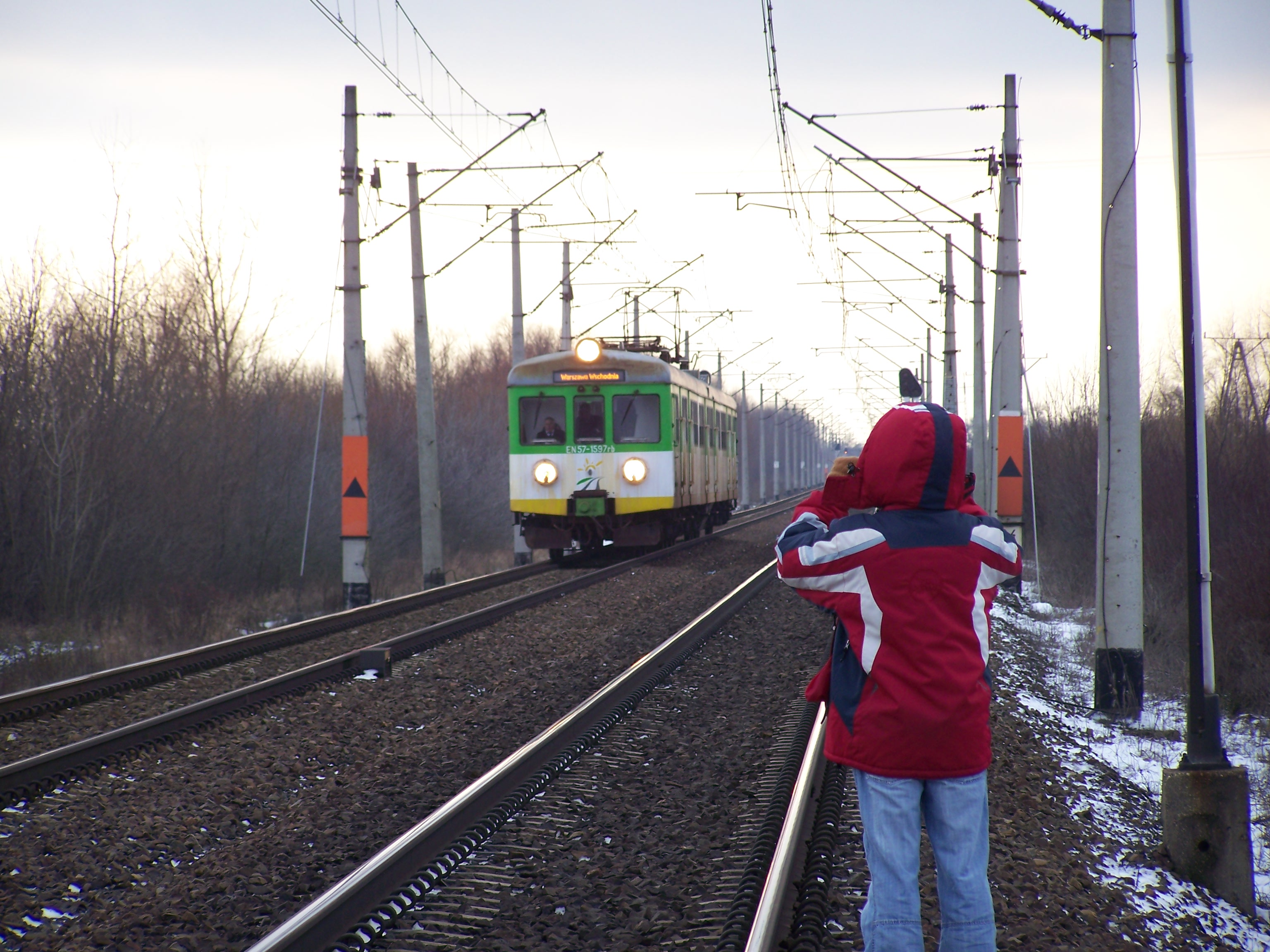
A trainspotter spotting a Masovian Railways PKP class EN57 in Poland

"Anorak" /ˈænəræk/ is a British slang term that refers to a person who has a very strong interest, perhaps obsessive, in niche subjects. This interest may be unacknowledged or not understood by the general public. The term is sometimes used synonymously with "geek" or "nerd", or the Japanese term "otaku", albeit referring to different niches.

== Etymology ==
The first use of the term to describe an obsessive fan has been credited to the radio presenter Andy Archer, who used the term in the early 1970s for fans of offshore radio, who would charter boats to come out to sea to visit the radio ships.

In 1983, the first edition of the Anoraks UK Weekly Report was published, featuring news of pirate radio broadcasts. In 1984 the Observer newspaper used the term as a metonym for the prototype group interested in detailed trivia, the trainspotters, as members of this group often wore unfashionable but warm cagoules or parkas called "anoraks" when standing for hours on station platforms or along railway tracks, noting down details of passing trains.

In the mid-1980's, the term was used to describe participants of the early British indie pop scene, brought on by the release of the NME compilation album C86. The term "anorak pop" was used as a synonym to refer to the genre.

== See also ==
- Otaku
- Railfan
