= Peter Storm =

Peter Storm may refer to:

- Peter Storm, the birth name of Swedish actor Peter Stormare
- Peter Storm (clothing), a brand of outdoor clothing
- Peter Storms, Master Commandant of the USS Peacock (1813)
