= K-Way =

French waterproof clothing brand

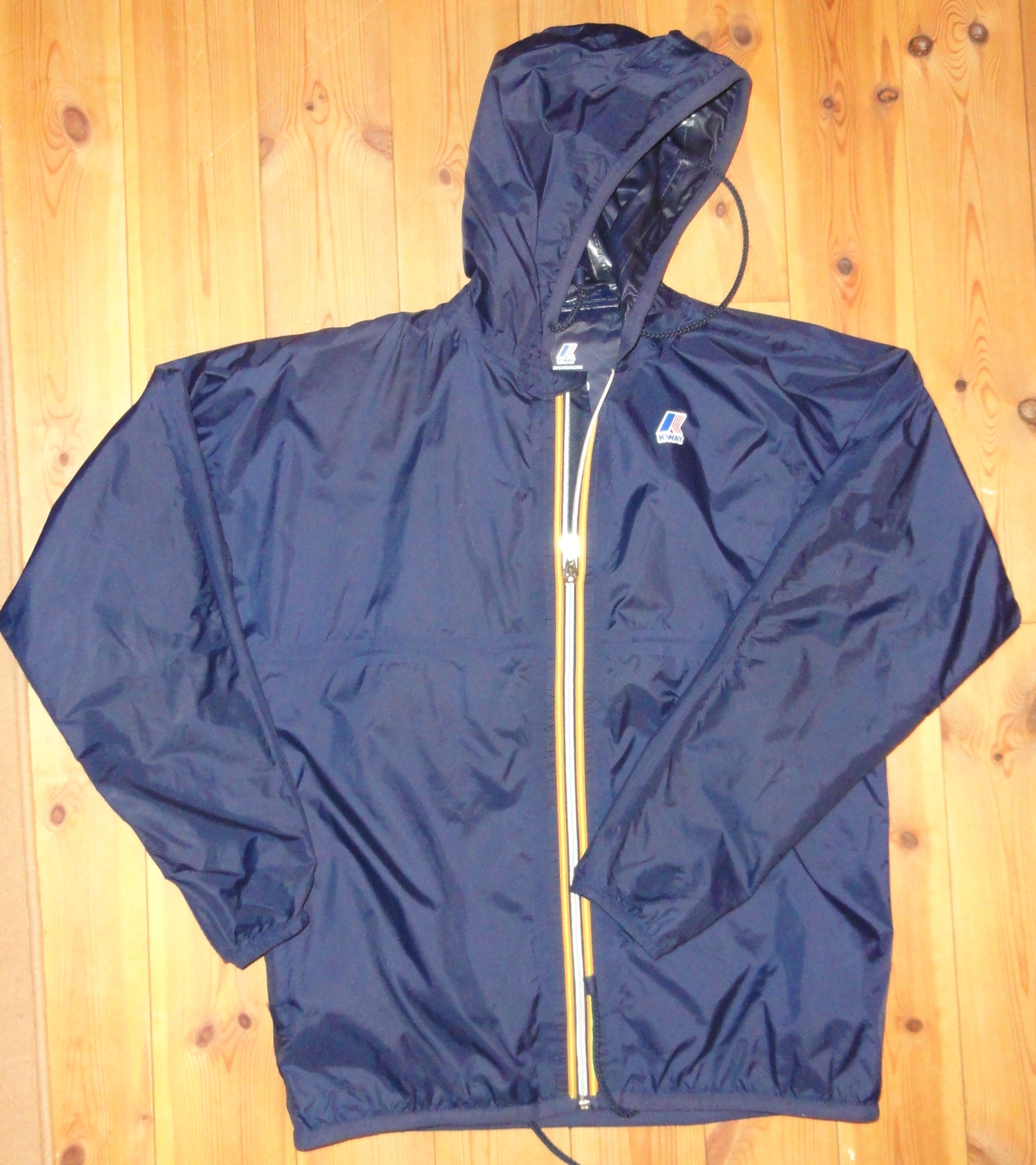
- Industry: Textile industry
- Founded: 1965
- Headquarters: Turin, Italy
- Key people: Léon-Claude Duhamel, Founder
- Products: Rain coats
- Website: www.k-way.com

K-Way is a French-Italian brand of waterproof clothing including a nylon windbreaker jacket that fits into a fanny pack, invented in 1965 in the North of France by Léon-Claude Duhamel. After declining, the brand was bought by an Italian company in 2004, then relaunched as a fashionable product, with an increase in the range of items sold. The K-Way word has become an antonomasia, a common name which started to broadly define such type of garments.

== History ==
K-Way was created in 1965 by Léon-Claude Duhamel, son of a trouser manufacturer in Harnes in the Pas-de-Calais. One rainy day, while he was at the Café de la Paix in Paris, he had the idea of a small, light and compact protection. The same year, the company Sofinal, a fabric manufacturer in Belgium, proposed a new product to his father, Léon Duhamel, coated nylon. Léon Duhamel suggested to his son Léon-Claude that they think about an idea for a practical application of this new product on clothing. Léon-Claude's idea was to free children from their heavy and uncomfortable rain gear and to be able to fold this kind of coated nylon windbreaker into a fanny pack, all with a choice of bright colours and a colourful zip. When it was launched, he called his nylon windbreaker "En-cas" (for rain) and the pouch was separate from the garment.

The following year, Léon-Claude Duhamel renamed his "en-K" to "K-Way" after months of debate, under the impetus of the Havas agency, headed by Mr. Castaing (the term "way" was more fashionable, evoking the American way of life), which gave it an international dimension. The advertisements spoke of a light and colourful product, and implied an American origin. 250.000 were sold in 1966; in the following years, sales increased and the product evolved.

In 1968, following the sudden death of Léon Duhamel, his son Léon-Claude, his daughter Jacotte and his son-in-law Yves Moinet continued the business and made it prosper. From the 1970s onwards, the K-way was a commercial success: more than two million units were sold each year. The brand partnered with the French Alpine ski team and developed a range of winter sports clothing. The brand reached its peak at the dawn of the 1980s when Sophie Marceau wore a K-Way in the movie La Boum.

In the 1980s, the brand was to be sold to the Blue Bell group, then owner of Wrangler; but the French government blocked the sale. In 1985, due to strategic differences, Yves and Jacotte Moinet left the company's management committee and left the reins of the business to Léon-Claude. The brand then tried to establish itself on the other side of the Atlantic but it was a fiasco. From 1988, sales fell, profitability was no longer there, competition and copies had been flooding the market for several years.

In 1991, the Pirelli brand bought the K-Way company, which was then close to bankruptcy. In 1992, K-Way was a partner of the French ski team for the Winter Olympics in Albertville. That year, a fire broke out in the Pas-de-Calais factory. The production of the K-way was permanently relocated to Portugal and the countries of North Africa.

Around 1995, the brand became a generic name and fell inexorably; thus the company went from a turnover of 500 million francs in 1992 to 100 million in 1996, the main cause being Asian competition. However, since its foundation, 45 million copies have been sold. Subsequently, in order to react to these cheap Asian products, the company tried to sell more elaborate clothing but, due to the tough competition, sales stagnated. In 1996, an Italian bank, Sopaf, took possession of the K-way brand.

The brand was taken over in 2004 by the BasicNet SpA group, an Italian company based in Turin and also owner of the Kappa, Robe di Kappa and Superga brands. The relaunch was first carried out in Italy before the end of the 2010s and then a few years later in France.

== Popular culture ==
In the film La Boum released in 1980, the heroine played by Sophie Marceau wears a navy blue K-way and thus influences teenagers.

Citroen AX K-way

In 1993, comedian Dany Boon wrote and performed Waïka, a successful sketch about the K-way in which he had this line: "It's waterproof but inside you're soaked through".

== Special vehicle ==
In 1988, a special run of Citroen AX designated AX K-way was introduced, incorporating the K-way logo and colour-co-ordinated upholstery.

== See also ==
- Jacket – garment
- Parka – Fur-lined cold weather overgarment
- Capote (garment) – Traditional North American garment
- Goggle jacket – Hooded windproof type jacket
- Hoodie – Sweatshirt with a hood
- Mackintosh (raincoat) – British name for a raincoat made of rubberised fabric
