= Kangaroo pocket =

Type of pocket

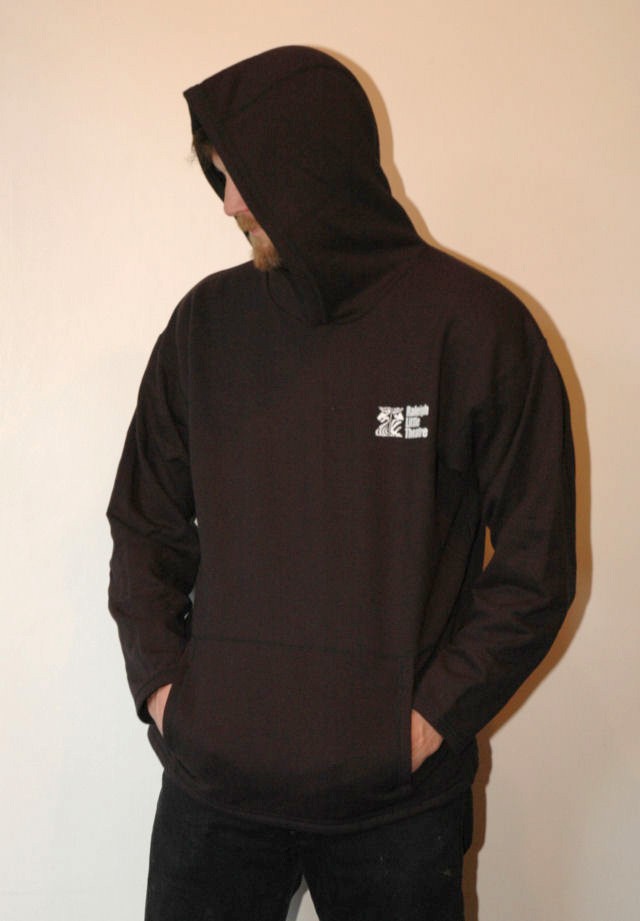
Kangaroo pocket

A kangaroo pocket is a type of pocket, usually featured on hoodies and sweatshirts, that is large enough to fit both hands into. The pocket has an opening on either side of the garment, with no divider between the two sides. Other names for it include muff pocket and hoodie pocket.

The pocket sits on the lower front section of the shirt. It is usually large enough to contain some personal belongings. The kangaroo pocket is most associated with casual clothing such as the hoodie or sweatshirt. Although the kangaroo pocket is often considered a stylish feature, it also has practical uses. It can serve as an insulated space for the wearer to warm their hands. Its spaciousness allows for carrying personal items like wallets or other belongings typically kept in rear pockets or purses. However, users should exercise caution because the pocket usually has wide openings on both sides, which could result in items falling out.

== Origin ==
Kangaroo pockets were introduced in the 1930s as hand warmers on sweatshirts. Their functionality expanded as people used them to hold phones, wallets, and other personal belongings. That caused them to become very popular with skateboarders and college students as they easily forget where they place their things.
