= Emilie Rissman =

American biologist

Emilie Rissman is an American professor in the Biological Sciences department at North Carolina State University.

Her research focuses on estrogens modulate sex differences in behavior. Her research also looks at the effect of parental exposure to Bisphenol A on offspring behavior in mice.

== Early life and education ==
Rissman was born in Chicago and went to middle school in Chicago through seventh grade at the Laboratory School. Her family moved after seventh grade to the north of San Francisco in Bolinas. Rissman obtained her Bachelor's Degree in Psychology from University of California, Berkeley. During her time there, she worked with Irving Zucker who studied circadian rhythms. She obtained a PhD in Biology and Psychology from Cornell University. Rissman was a professor of biochemistry and molecular genetics at the University of Virginia School of Medicine before she moved to North Carolina. In 1995, Rissman developed the Society for Behavioral Endocrinology, which was renamed to the Society for Behavioral Neuroendocrinology to better reflect the neural, cellular, and molecular direction of the field.
