= Hoodie =

Sweatshirt with a hood

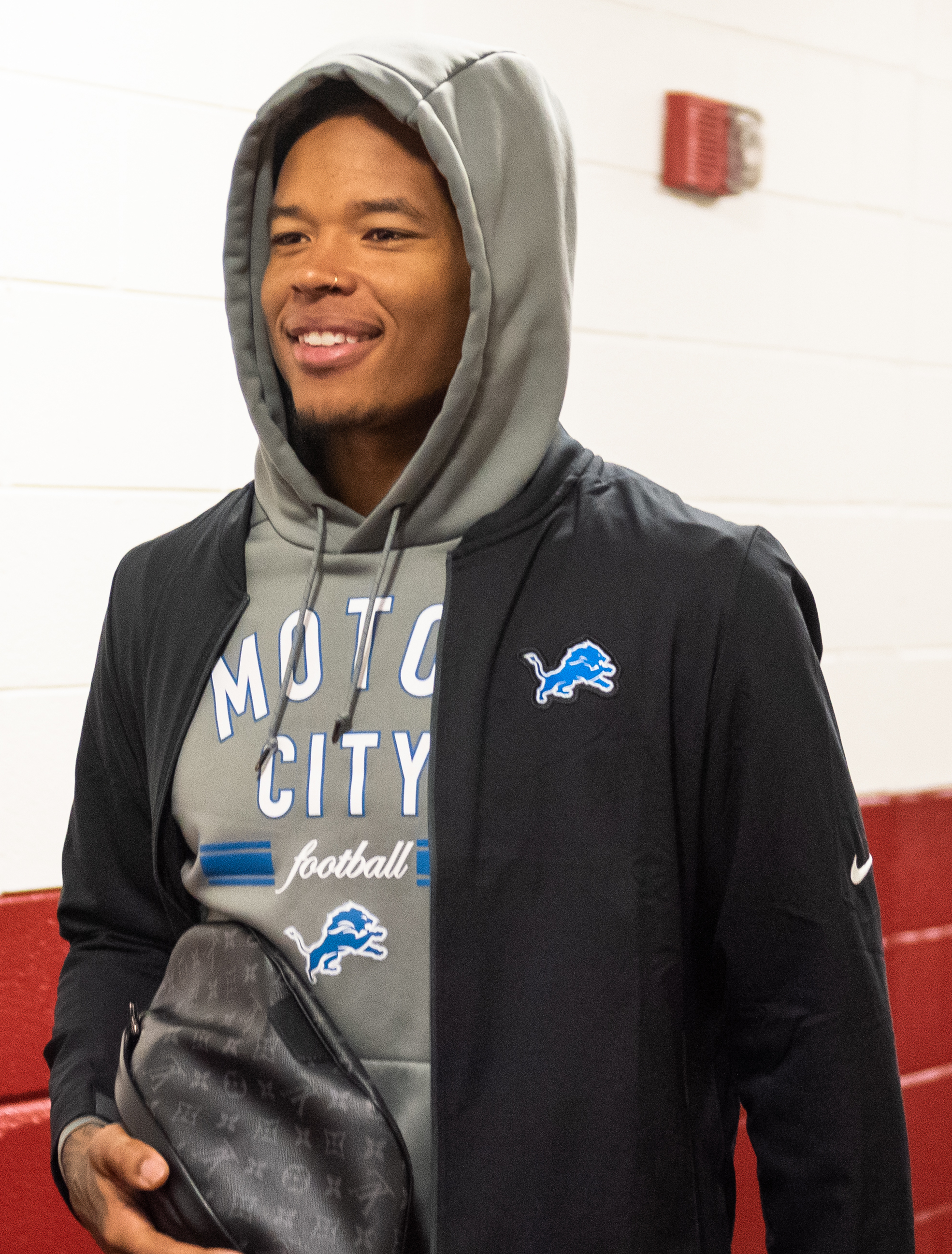
American football player Marvin Jones wearing a hoodie underneath a jacket

A hoodie is a type of jacket or sweatshirt with a hood that, when worn up, covers most of the head and neck, and sometimes the face.

Pullover-style hoodies often include a single large kangaroo pocket or muff on the lower front, while hoodies with zippers usually include two pockets, one on either side of the zipper, in the same location. Both styles typically include a drawstring to adjust the hood opening. Hoodies may be worn for aesthetic purposes, or protection against the weather, such as cold, wind, and rain.

== Terminology ==
The word hood derives from the Anglo-Saxon word hōd, ultimately of the same root as an English hat.

Hoodie, sometimes spelled hoody, is an abbreviation of hooded sweatshirt. The name 'hoodie' entered popular usage in the 1990s.

According to the Oxford English Dictionary, the term is also colloquially used in British and Irish English to describe a hooligan or thug.

A study done in 2023 and published in a journal called The English Languages: History, Diaspora, Culture found that Canadian respondents preferred the term "hoodie" by a wide margin. However, those with ties to Saskatchewan may prefer the regional term "bunnyhug", while those with ties to Western Canada, especially older individuals, may use "kangaroo jacket". They found no relation between gender and term use; they found that younger people were more likely to give a variety of terms and hypothesized that they may have been trying to fit in.

== History ==
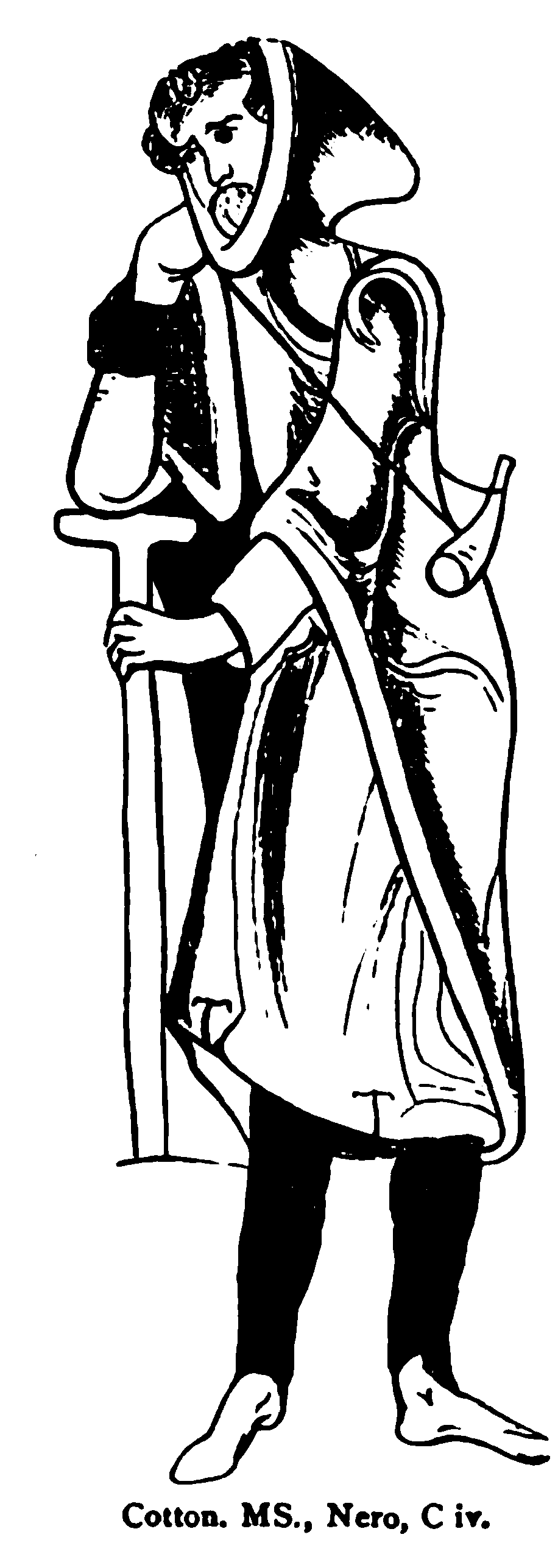
This 19th-century book illustration copies a 12th-century English image of a man wearing a hooded tunic.

The garment's style and form can be traced back to Medieval Europe when the preferred clothing for Catholic monks included a hood called a cowl attached to a tunic or robes, and a chaperon or hooded cape was very commonly worn by any outdoors worker. Its appearance was known in England as early as the 12th century, possibly an import with the Norman conquest of England, as the capa was "a short hooded cloak which was common in Normandy."

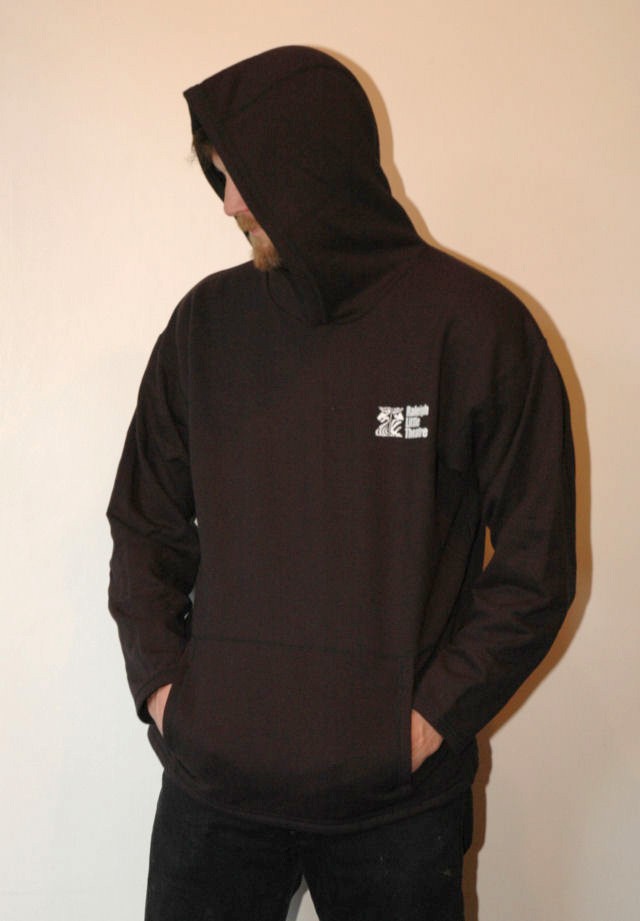
A person wearing a pullover hoodie

The hooded pullover is a utilitarian garment that originated in the 1930s in the US for workers in cold New York warehouses. The earliest clothing style was first produced by Champion in the 1930s in Rochester and marketed to laborers working in freezing temperatures in upstate New York.

The hoodie became popular in the 1970s, with several factors contributing to its success. Hip hop culture developed in New York City around this time and high fashion also took off during this era, as Norma Kamali and other high-profile designers embraced and glamorized the new clothing. The hoodie also gained in popularity through athletic culture, especially following its prominent appearance in the 1976 film Rocky.

By the 1990s, the hoodie had evolved into a symbol of isolation. The association with ravers in the UK developed around this time, as their popularity rose with that specific demographic. Young men, often skateboarders or surfers, sported the hoodie and spread the trend across the western part of the United States, most significantly in California. Tommy Hilfiger, Giorgio Armani, and Ralph Lauren, for example, used the hoodie as the primary component for many of their collections in the 1990s.

== Subcultures ==
=== Hackers ===
In the early 21st century, the image of hackers became associated with hoodies. Elliot Alderson, the protagonist of Mr. Robot, is a vigilante hacker who constantly wears a black hoodie.

== By country ==
=== Australia ===
In June 2011, police in Wynnum, Brisbane, Australia launched a "Hoodie Free Zone" initiative, with shopkeepers encouraged to ask hoodie-wearers to leave. The zone was part of an initiative to educate businesses on how to avoid armed robberies, in which the hoodie type of clothing was reportedly often worn.

=== Canada ===
Across Canada, hoodies are a popular clothing item. They are sometimes worn under a coat or jacket to provide an extra layer of clothing during the winter. In Saskatchewan, only the zipperless, pullover version of the garment is referred to as the noun "Bunny Hug."

=== New Zealand ===
The "Hoodies on Parliament—politicians challenge youth stereotypes" campaign was launched in May 2008 in New Zealand (NZ) as part of the annual national Youth Week event, a pro-youth initiative organized to challenge youth stereotypes. To launch the campaign, NZ politicians, including National MP Nicky Wagner, Green Party MPs Sue Bradford, Nandor Tanczos and Metiria Turei, and Maori party MP Hone Harawira, wore hoodies while standing on the steps of the country's parliament. Archbishop David Moxon, Archbishop of the Anglican Dioceses, and Brian Turner President of the Methodist Church of NZ also participated in the campaign.

Support and criticism were raised by politicians, who were divided over the 2008 event. One strong response was drawn from a local government council member, Dale Evans, who donned a Ku Klux Klan outfit in protest, citing the hoodie as "not an appropriate article of clothing to celebrate."

"Goodie in a Hoodie" day was then run in 2009 by New Zealand Aotearoa Adolescent Health & Development (NZAAHD) in partnership with Age Concern—the organisations used the campaign to highlight the stereotypes that both young people and the elderly face in New Zealand. Liz Baxendine, president of Age Concern at the time, said to the media:

Older people and young people have a lot in common. We both face stereotypes based on our age rather than our real achievements and outlook on life ... we've got to destigmatise the hoodie and see it for what it is. Everyone wears them. We need to take the hoodie back!

=== United Kingdom ===
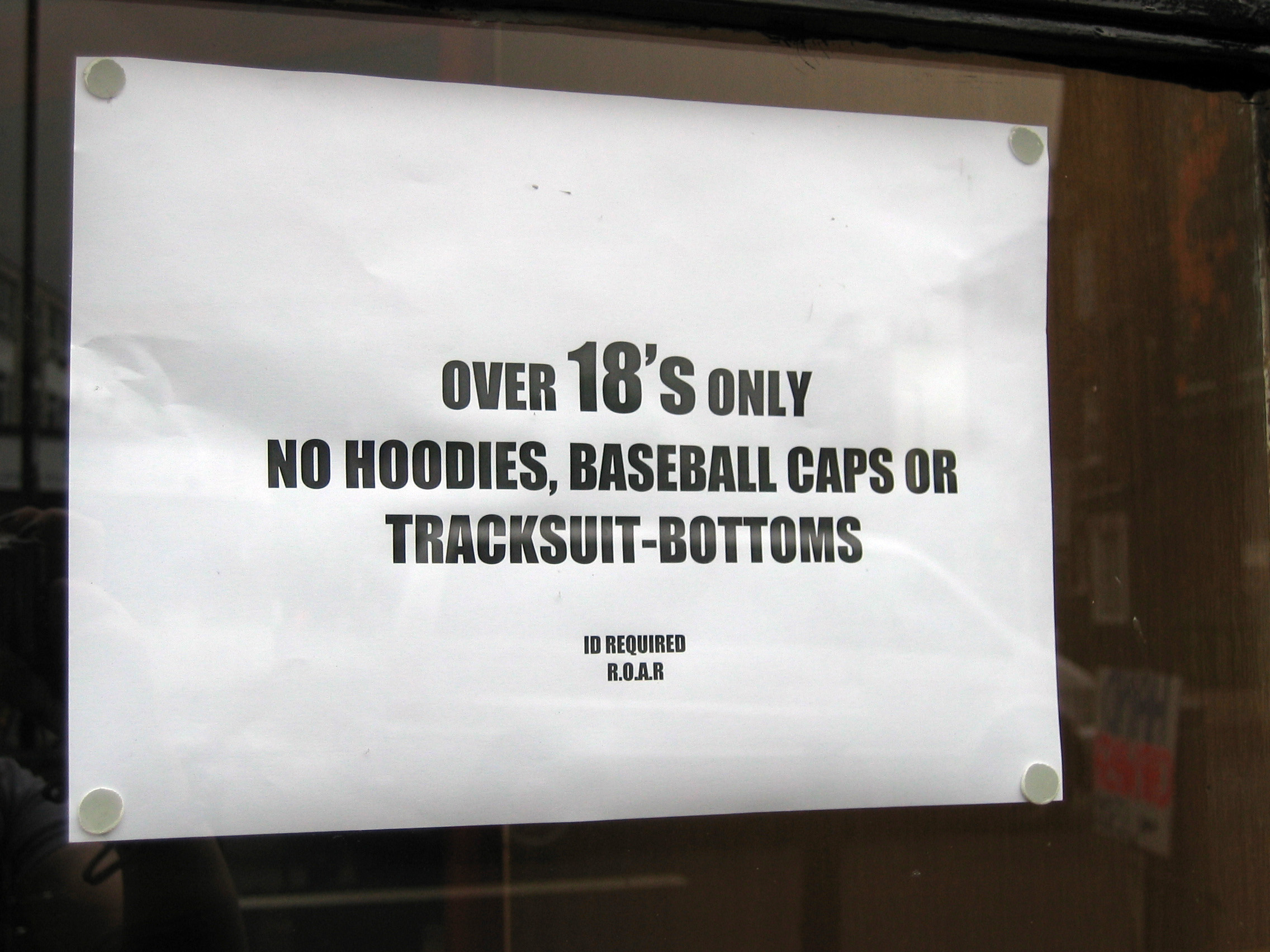
"No hoodies" sign outside a pub in South London, 2006

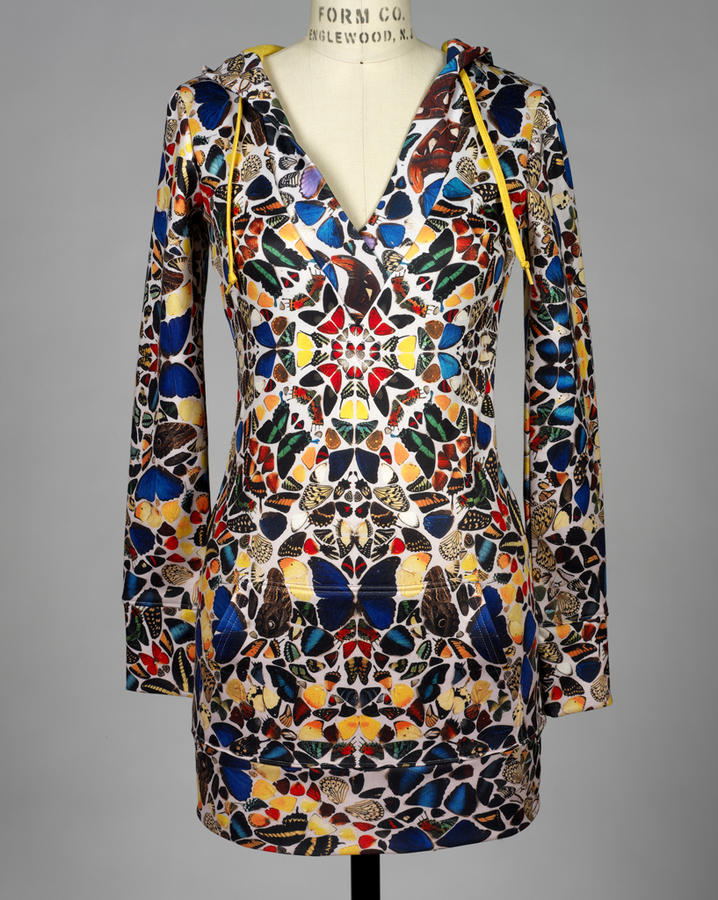
Butterfly Hoodie by Damien Hirst for Adrian Nyman (2008)

In the UK, hoodies have been the subject of much criticism; some shoplifters have used the hood to conceal their identities from CCTV cameras in shopping centres. The hoodie became a popular clothing item by the 1990s. By the 21st century, it had gained a negative image, being associated with anti-social behaviour. It became one of the later items associated with "chavs", or Neds.

Angela McRobbie, professor of communications at Goldsmiths College in the UK, says the appeal of the hoodie is its promise of anonymity, mystery and anxiety. "The point of origin is obviously black American hip-hop culture, now thoroughly mainstream and a key part of the global economy. Leisure and sportswear adopted for everyday wear suggests a distance from the world of office suit or school uniform. Rap culture celebrates defiance, as it narrates the experience of social exclusion. Musically and stylistically, it projects menace and danger as well as anger and rage. The hooded top is one in a long line of garments chosen by young people, usually boys, to which are ascribed meanings suggesting that they are 'up to no good'. In the past, such appropriation was usually restricted to membership of specific youth cultures—leather jackets, bondage trousers—but nowadays it is the norm among young people to flag up their music and cultural preferences in this way, hence the adoption of the hoodie by boys across the boundaries of age, ethnicity and class."

In May 2005, Bluewater shopping centre in Kent caused outrage by launching a code of conduct which bans its shoppers from sporting hoodies or baseball caps, although the garments remain on sale. John Prescott welcomed the move, stating that he was threatened by the presence of teenagers wearing hoodies at a motorway service station. Then–Prime Minister Tony Blair openly supported this stance and vowed to clamp down on the anti-social behaviour with which hoodie-wearers are sometimes associated. London-based rapper Lady Sovereign published a single titled "Hoodie" in protest as part of a "Save the Hoodie" campaign.

In 2005, Coombeshead College in the south-west of England allowed the hoodie to become part of the boys' school uniform, but the hood could be put up only when it rained. The principal, Richard Haigh, stated that the move would help to calm some of what he called the "hysteria" surrounding the garment.

In February 2006, a 58-year-old teacher who was wearing a hooded top was asked to remove it when entering a Tesco store in Swindon. According to the teacher, she was wearing the hood because "my hair's a mess". The store did not have a hoodie policy. The shop apologized and said it was taking action to "make sure this doesn't happen again."

In July 2006, David Cameron, leader of the Conservative Party, made a speech suggesting that the hoodie was worn more for defensive than offensive purposes. The speech was referred to as "hug a hoodie" by the Labour Party.

In 2019, the British fashion label Burberry had to apologize for an inappropriate hoodie. In its runway show, the fashion label featured a piece of cloth with a "noose" around the neck, which caused a backlash on social media.

A March 2020 article in the Belfast Telegraph argued that hoodies were not as associated with the working class as in previous years, noting that Catherine, Duchess of Cambridge had appeared in a hoodie.

=== United States ===
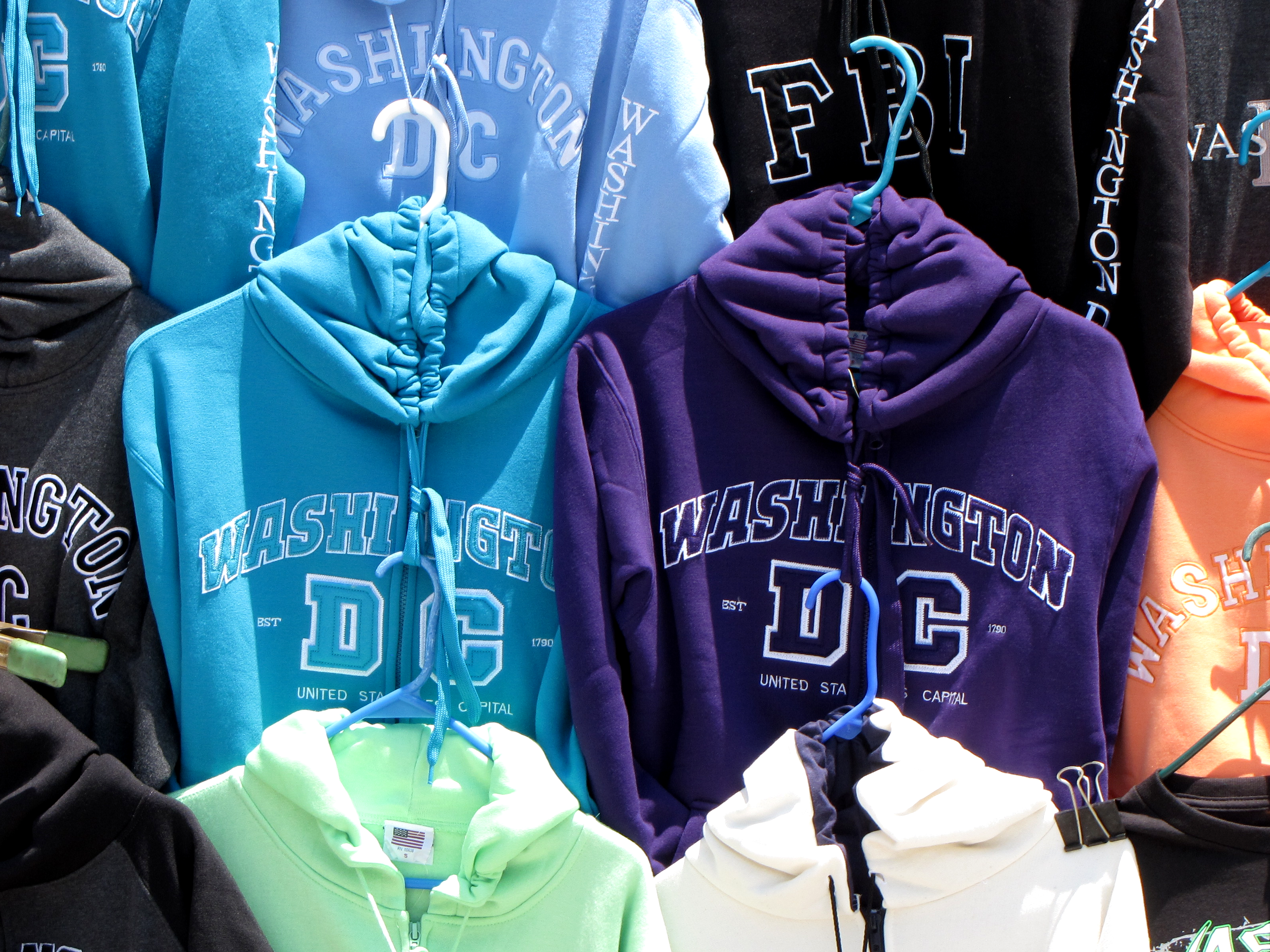
Souvenir Hoodies in Washington, D.C.

Hoodies have become a mainstream fashion in the U.S., transcending the clothing item's original utilitarian purpose, similar to jeans. This clothing item has found its way into a variety of styles, even so far as to be worn under a suit jacket. Hoodies with zippers are generally referred to as zip-up hoodies, while a hoodie without a zipper may be described as a pullover hoodie. Throughout the U.S., it is common for teenagers and young adults to wear sweatshirts—with or without hoods—that display their respective school names or mascots across the chest, either as part of a uniform or personal preference.

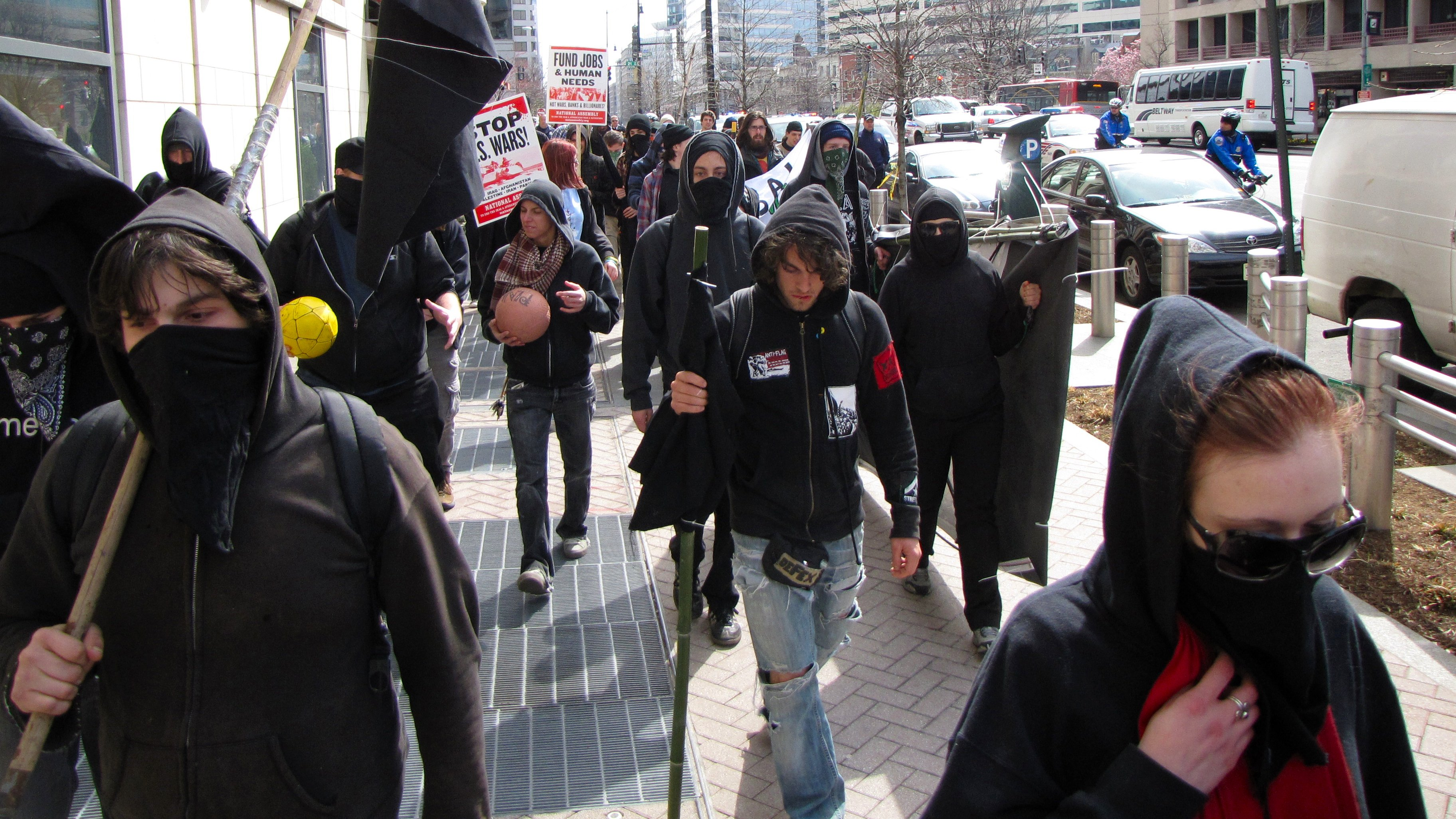
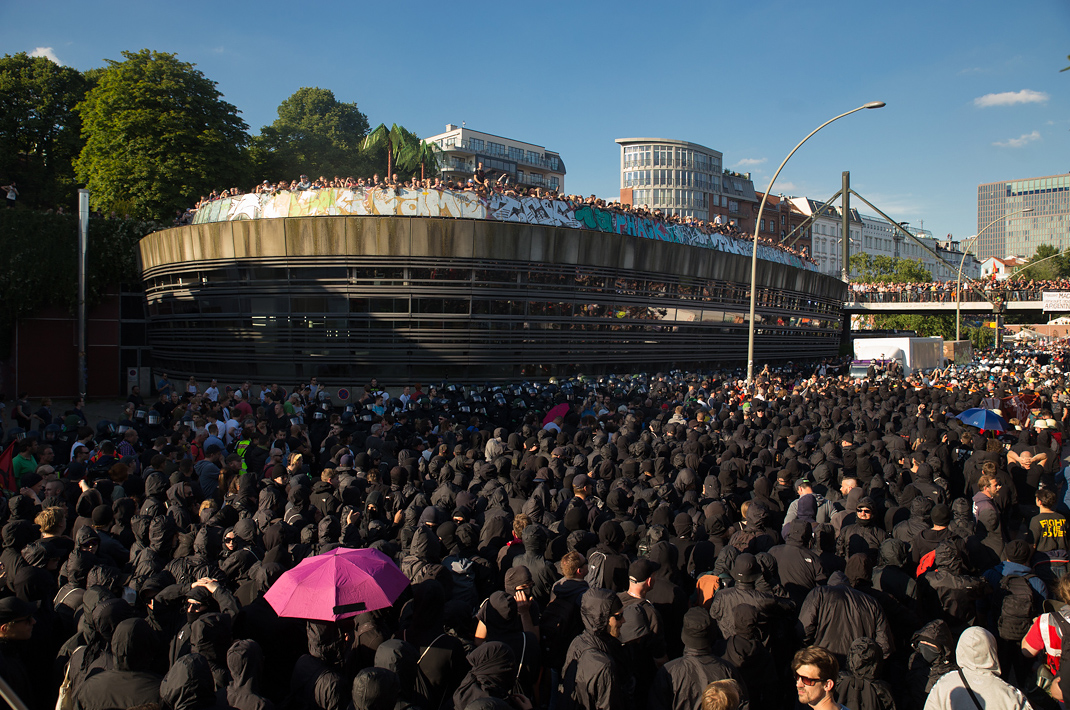
Black bloc in the US and Germany using hoodies

The hooded sweatshirt is a utilitarian garment that originated in the 1930s for workers in cold New York warehouses and thus have been around for over 90 years. In the 1970s and 1980s, hoodies were adopted by hip hop culture as a symbol of what one reporter termed "cool anonymity and vague menace". When the garment was depicted in FBI composite drawings of Unabomber Ted Kaczynski, the hoodie became linked to "seedy threatening criminality", thereby further asserting its non-mainstream symbolism.

In 2012, Trayvon Martin was shot by George Zimmerman while wearing a hoodie. Protests over the shooting death involved hoodies. Fox News host Geraldo Rivera encouraged young black people to stop wearing hoodies though he later apologized for his comments. Zimmerman's defense team offered what was called "the hoodie defense". They argued that it was reasonable for Zimmerman to regard Martin's hoodie as a threat. According to Carolyn Fluehr-Lobban, author of Race and Racism, the garment became emblematic of the Black Lives Matter movement following Zimmerman's trial. Dress Codes author, law Professor Richard Thompson Ford, said that "As the hoodie became associated with 'Black hoodlums' in the media, some Black people avoided them and others embraced them: the public image of the hoodie made it into a statement of racial pride and defiance, solidarity with a community, an emblem of belonging, and all of that reinforced the negative associations for those who were inclined to be afraid of assertive Black people."

Meta CEO Mark Zuckerberg often wears a plain grey zip-up hoodie rather than a business suit, drawing comments during his company's 2012 initial public offering.

In 2015, Oklahoma state representative Don Barrington proposed a bill to criminalize wearing a "robe, mask or other disguise" in public that would "intentionally conceal the wearer's identity", a bill which was criticized as an attempt to criminalize the wearing of the hoodie.

== In art ==
“Hoodie Bust” sculpture by Mark Jenkins

In about 1994 the American artist Dan Witz wheat-pasted a series of silkscreened hooded figures, which he called Hoodys, around downtown Manhattan, at a time when the area was troubled by drugs, crime and HIV. Witz described the hooded figure as "a danger sign, an archetype (for me) of disenfranchisement and loss." The British street artist Banksy appears in the 2010 documentary Exit Through the Gift Shop with "his head hooded, his face in deep shadow, his voice electronically altered."

The hooded silhouette is a recurring feature of the street sculptures of the American artist Mark Jenkins, whose life-size figures have no faces. Some wear the hood drawn tight, which Jenkins calls "moles because they can't really see"; others wear an open hood with no head inside.

== See also ==
- Baja jacket
- Cardigan (sweater)
- Goggle jacket
- Parka
- K-Way
