= Peter Storm (clothing) =

British outdoor clothing brand

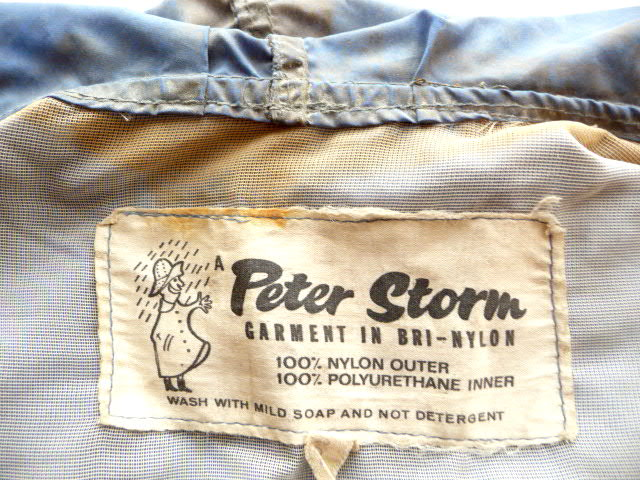
Vintage Peter Storm cagoule label showing garment fabric as polyurethane-coated nylon (the brown staining is from aged glue used to treat the sewing needle-holes that penetrate the PU coating in an effort to restore the fabric's water-repellent properties)

Peter Storm is an outdoor clothing brand developed in the United Kingdom. It was originally created in 1954 by former Royal Marine Noel Bibby as a company supplying waterproof nylon rainwear.

In 1964.Bibby was credited with inventing the cagoule.

After Bibby's death in 1989, the British rights to the name were bought by Blacks Leisure Group, subsequently acquired by JD Sports after administration in 2012, and Peter Storm branded clothes are now sold mainly through its chains of Blacks, Millets, Tiso and GO Outdoors shops. A different line of clothing is sold internationally under the Peter Storm name by Outdoor Equipment.
