= Parka =

Fur-lined cold weather overgarment

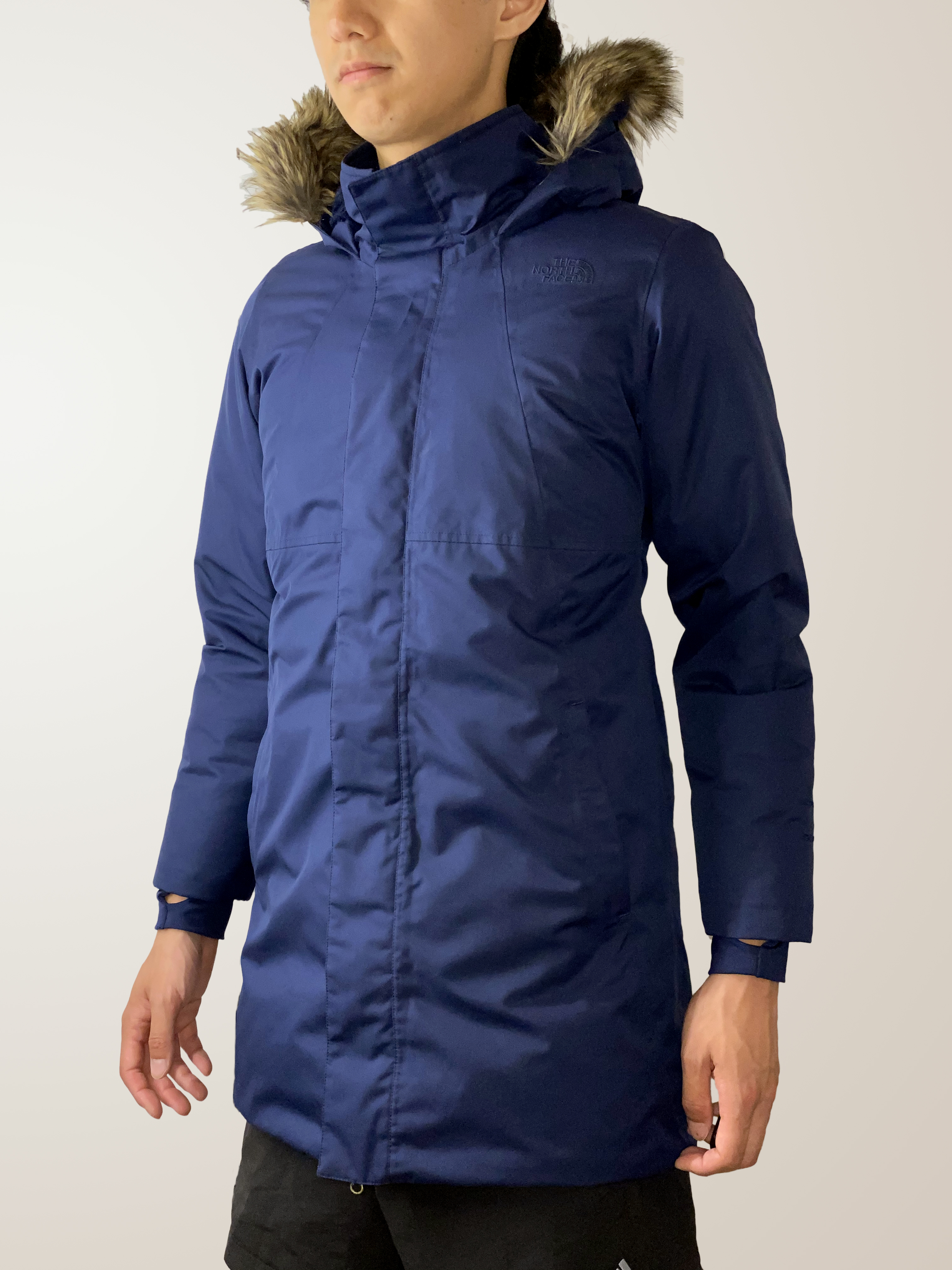
A modern down parka with faux-fur trim on the hood

A parka, along with the related anorak, is a type of coat with a hood, that may be lined with fur or fake fur. Parkas and anoraks are staples of Inuit clothing, traditionally made from caribou or seal skin, for hunting and kayaking in the frigid Arctic. Some Inuit anoraks require regular coating with fish oil to retain their water resistance. Parkas are typically longer, often extending to the thighs or knees. Anoraks are usually shorter than parkas, often hip-length, and are traditionally a pull-over jacket.

The words anorak and parka have been used interchangeably, but they are somewhat different garments. Strictly speaking, an anorak is a waterproof, hooded, pull-over jacket without a front opening, and sometimes drawstrings at the waist and cuffs, and a parka is a hip-length cold-weather coat, typically stuffed with down or very warm synthetic fiber, and with a fur-lined hood.

== Etymology ==
The word anorak comes from the Greenlandic (Kalaallisut) word annoraaq. It did not appear in English until 1924; an early definition is "a beaded item worn by Greenland women or brides in the 1930s". In the early 1950s it was made from nylon, but changed to poplin by 1959, when it was featured in Vogue magazine as a fashion item. In 1984, The Observer used the term to refer to the type of people who wore it and subsequently, in the United Kingdom, it is sometimes used as a mildly derogatory term.

The word parka is derived from the Nenets language. In the Aleutian Islands the word simply means "animal skin". It first entered the English written record in a 1625 work by Samuel Purchas.

The Inuit who speak Inuktitut use parkas and have various terms related to them as follows:

Inuktitut terminology
English	Inuktitut syllabics	Roman Inuktitut	IPA
woman's parka	ᐊᕐᓇᐅᑎ	irnauti	[iʁ.na.u.ˈti]
parka tail	ᓂᖏᒻᓇᖅᑐᖅ	ningimnaqtuq	[ni.ŋim.naq.ˈtuq]
parka hood	ᐊᒪᐅᑦ	amaut	[a.ma.ˈut]
parka decoration	ᑰᑦᓯᓂᕈᑎ	kuutsinaruti	[kuːt.si.na.ʁu.ˈti]
parka material	ᐊᑎᒋᑦᓴᖅ	atigitsaq	[a.ti.ɣit.ˈsaq]
parka button	ᓇᑦᑐᕋᖅ	naturaq	[nat.tu.ˈʁaq]
parka belt	ᑕᑦᓯ	tatsi	[tat.ˈsi]

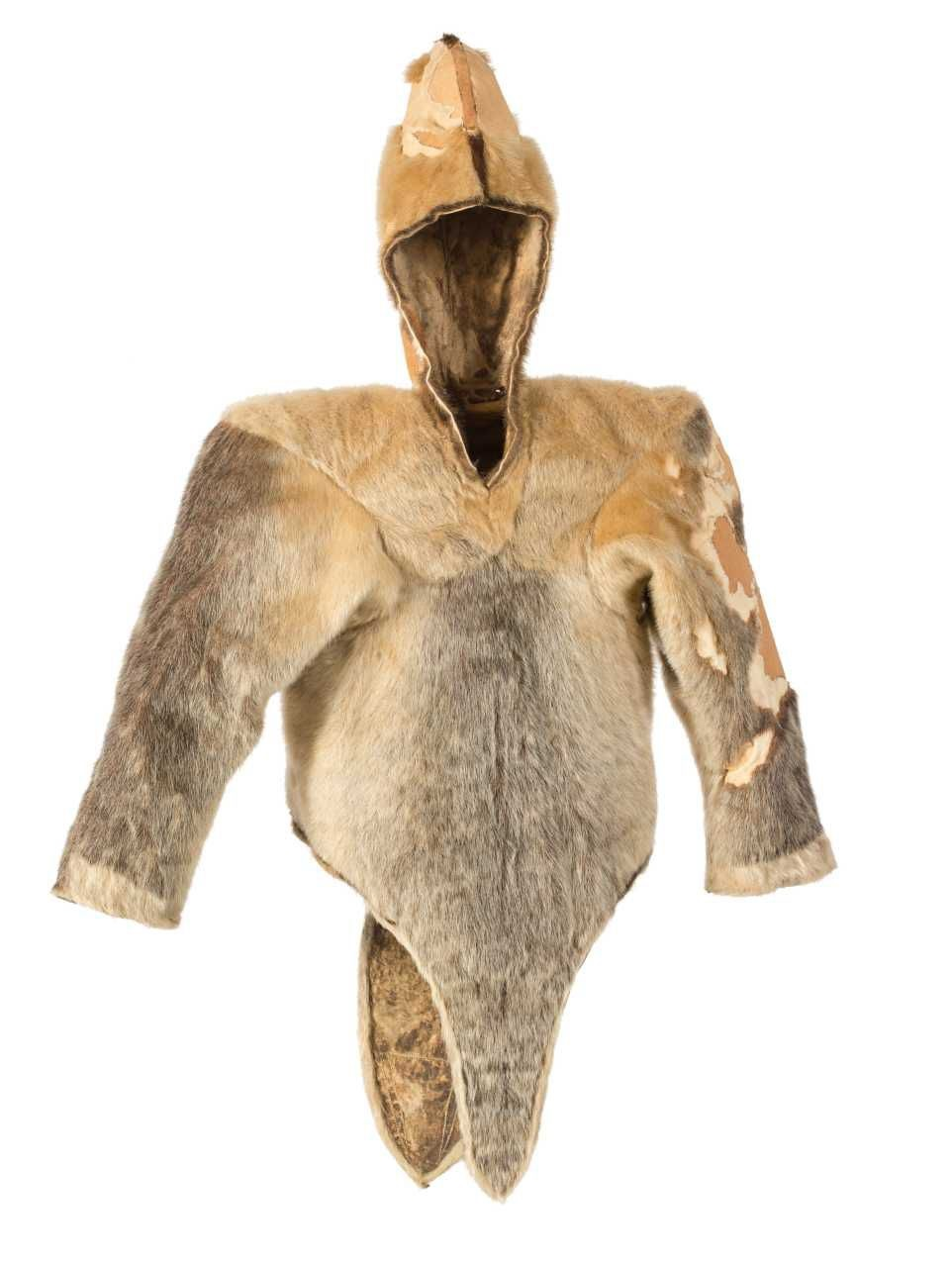
Sealskin woman's parka discovered at Qilakitsoq in 1972, dated to c. 1475

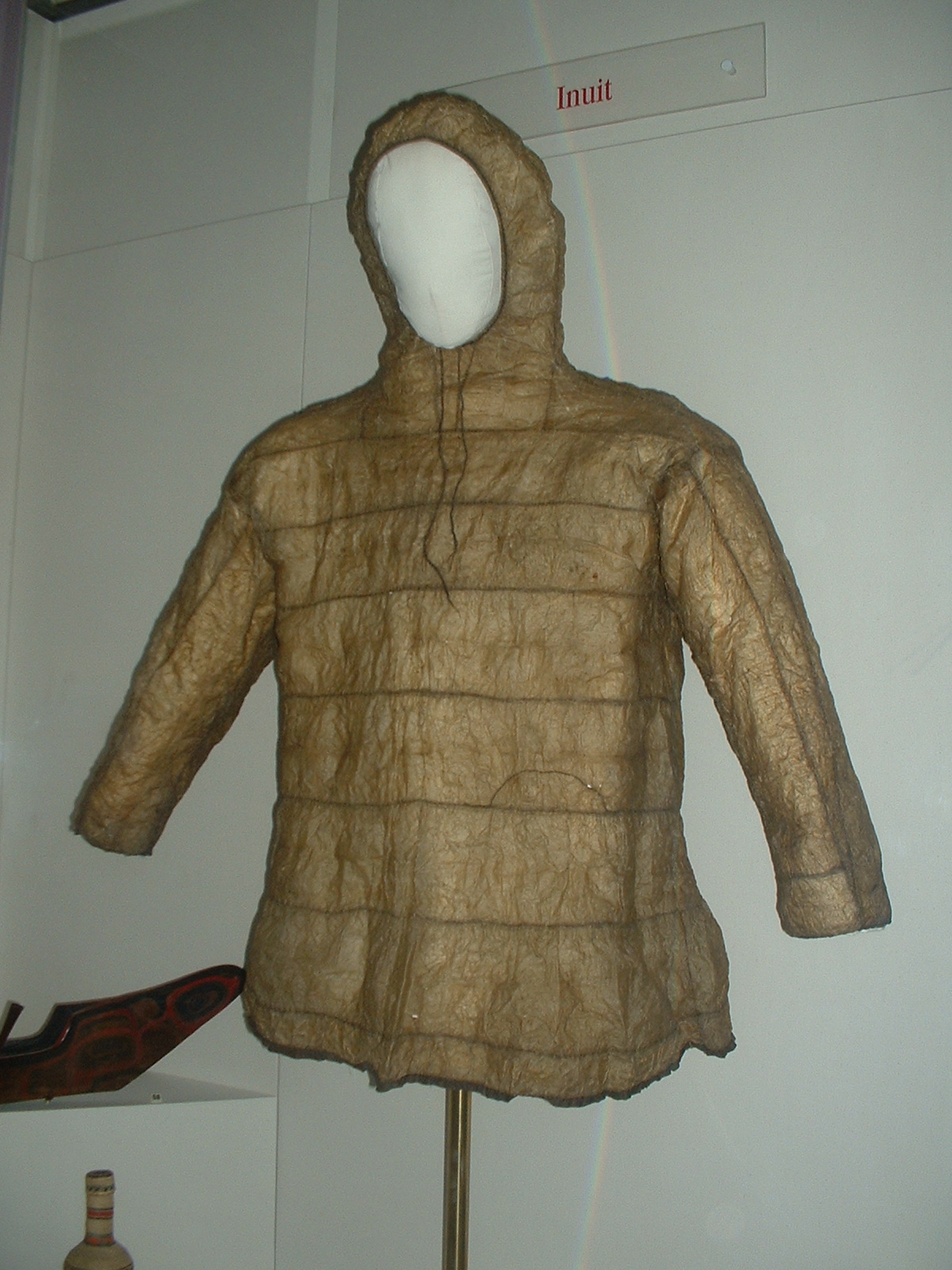
A traditional Inuit anorak made of gutskin

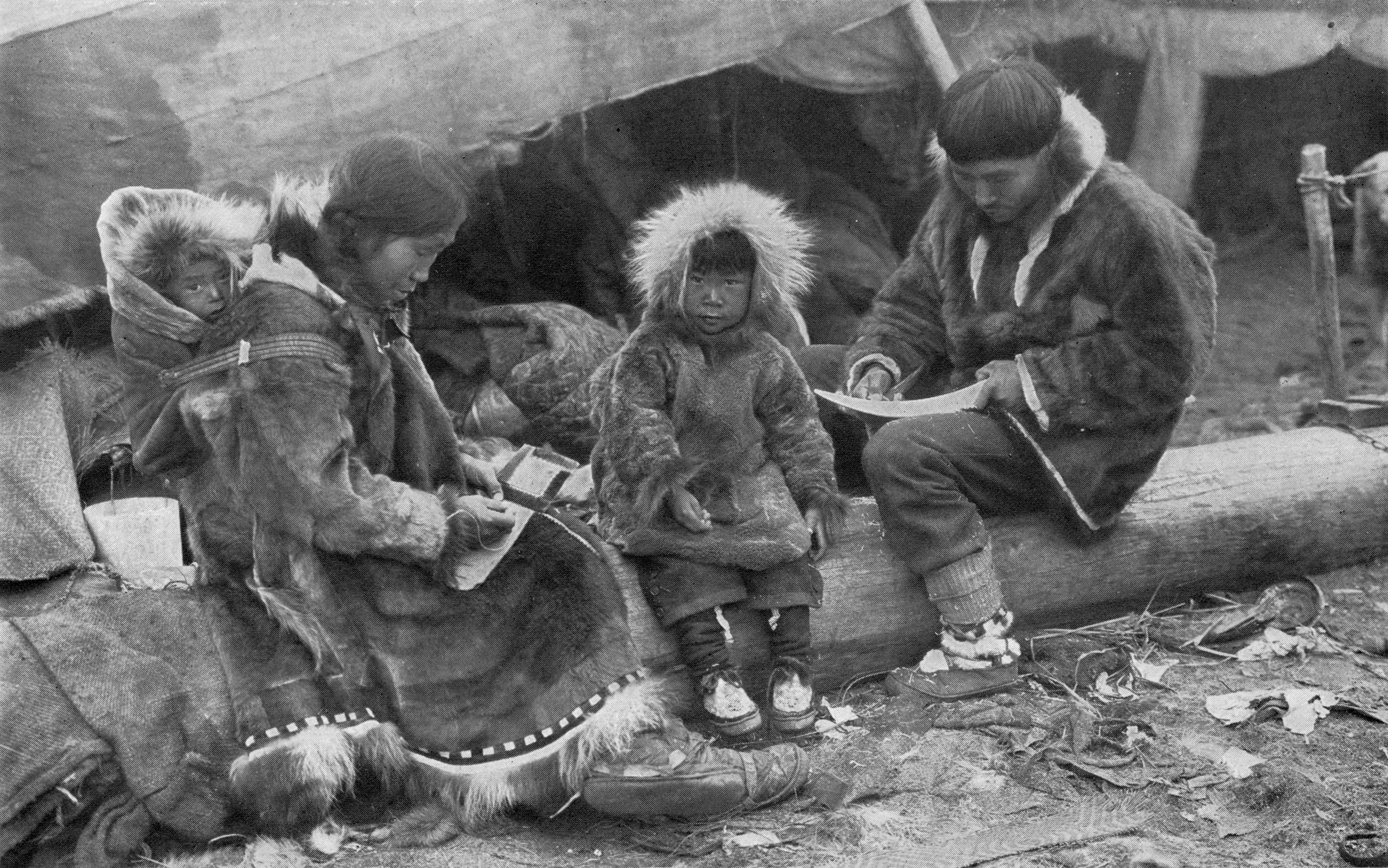
An Inuit family wearing traditional caribou parkas

== Amauti ==
An amauti (also amaut or amautik, plural amautiit) is a parka worn by Inuit women of the eastern area of Northern Canada. Up until about two years of age, the child nestles against the mother's back in the amaut, the built-in baby pouch just below the hood. The pouch is large and comfortable for the baby. The mother can bring the child from back to front for breastfeeding or for eliminatory functions without exposure to the elements. This traditional eastern Arctic Inuit parka, designed to keep the child warm and safe from frostbite, wind and cold, also helps to develop bonding between mother and child.

== N-3B ("scrub snorkel" or "snorkel") parka ==
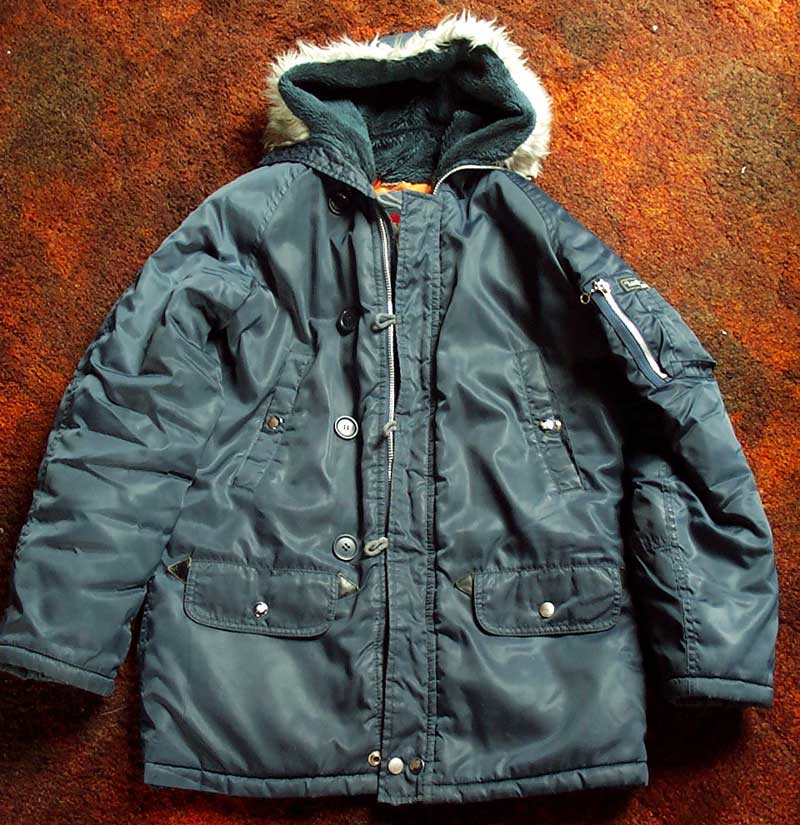
A civilian snorkel parka manufactured in the 1980s by Lord Anthony

The original snorkel parka (USAF N-3B parka, which is 3/4 length and has a full, attached hood; the similar N-2B parka is waist-length and has an attached split hood) was developed in the United States during the early 1950s for military use, mainly for flight crews stationed in extremely cold areas. It was designed for use in areas with temperatures as low as −60 °F (−51 °C). Originally made with a sage green DuPont flight silk nylon outer and lining it was padded with a wool blanket type material until the mid-1970s when the padding was changed to polyester wadding making the jacket both lighter and warmer. The outer shell material also was changed to a sage green cotton-nylon blend, with respective percentages 80–20, 65–35, and 50–50 being used at various times.

It gained the common name of "snorkel parka" because the hood can be zipped right up leaving only a small tunnel (or snorkel) for the wearer to look out of. This is particularly effective in very cold, windy weather although it has the added liabilities of seriously limiting the field of vision and hearing. Earlier Vietnam-era hoods had genuine fur ruffs; later versions used synthetic furs.

The basic N-3B parka design was copied and sold to the civilian market by many manufacturers with varying degrees of quality and fidelity to the original government specifications. Surplus military parkas are often available for relatively low prices online and in surplus stores; they compare quite favorably with civilian extreme-cold parkas of all types due to their robust construction, designed for combat conditions, and warmth.

The 1970s–1980s civilian version of the parka was made in many colors, including navy blue, green, brown, black, maroon, grey, royal blue, sky blue and bright orange. Most had an orange diamond quilted nylon lining.

== Fishtail parka ==
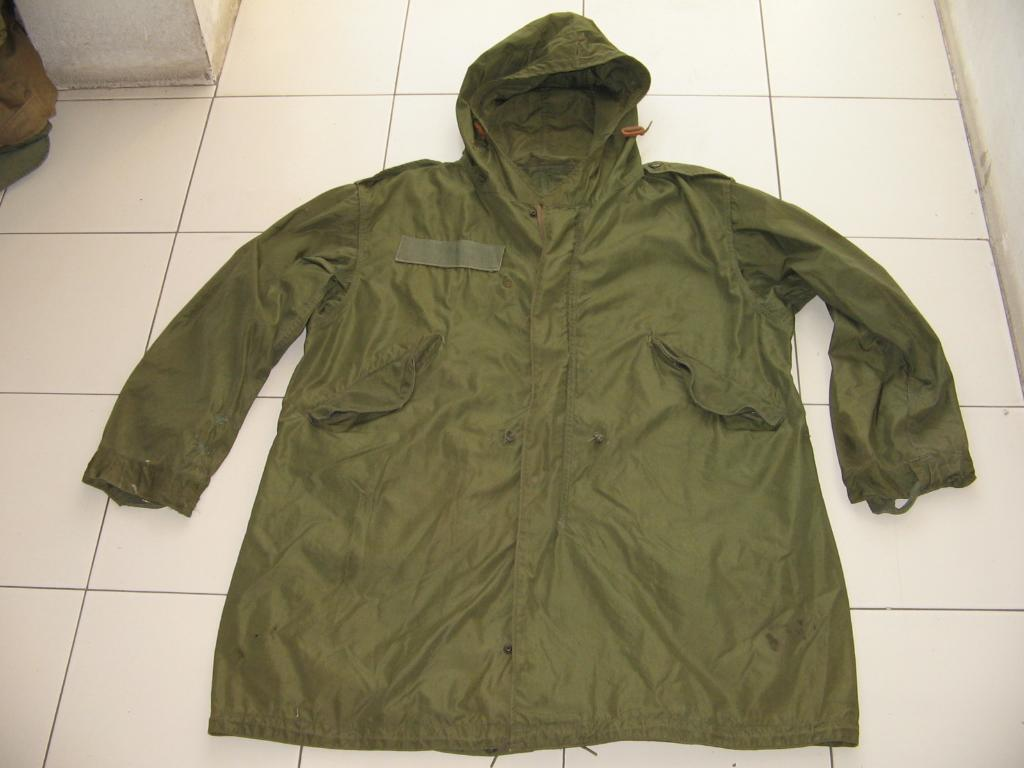
The M-51 fishtail parka was a favorite among the mod subculture.

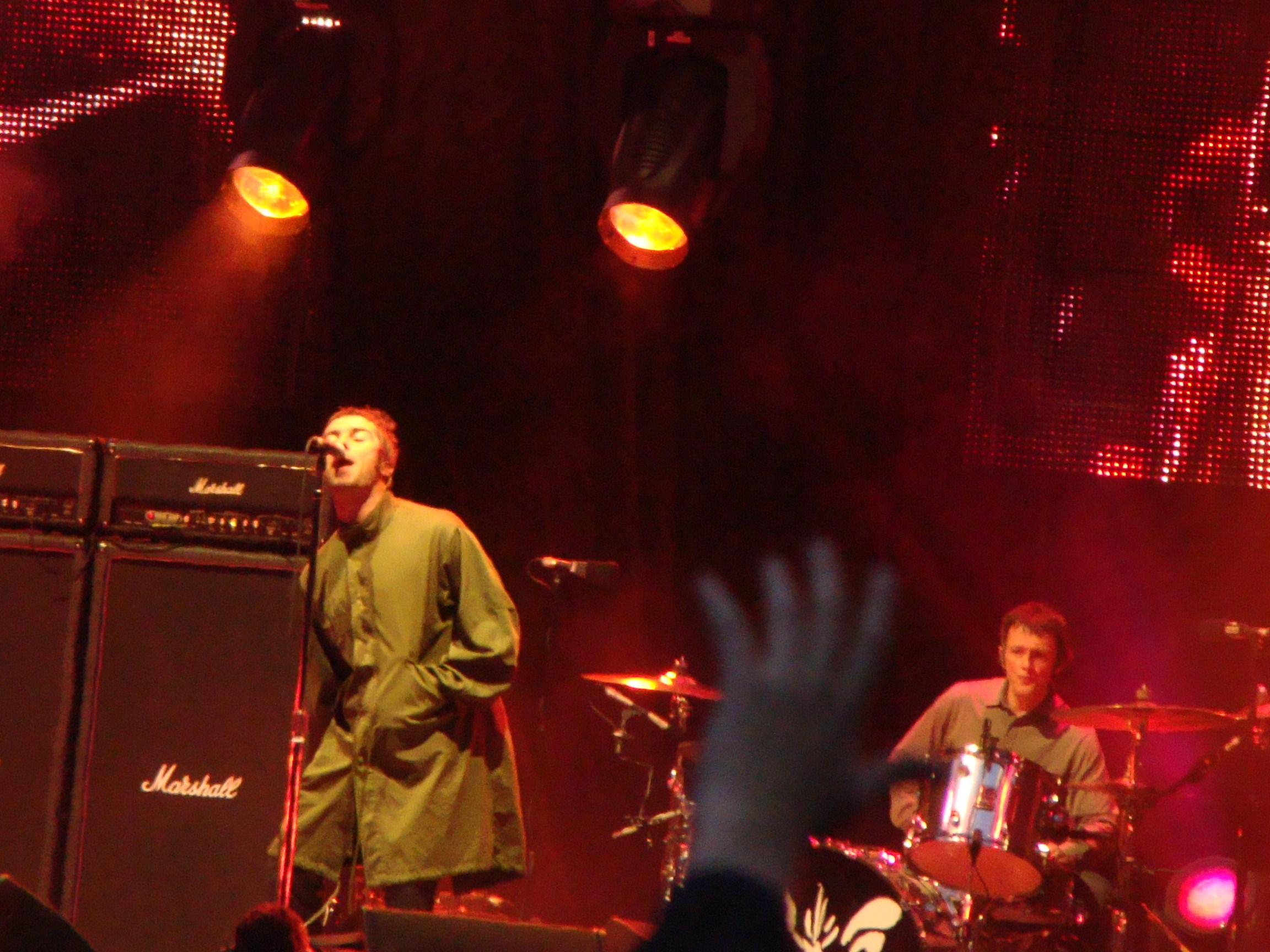
Liam Gallagher (left) of Britpop band Oasis wearing a fishtail parka at a concert in 2009

The fishtail parka was first used by the United States Army in 1950 during the Korean War. Following the end of the Second World War the US army recognized the need for a new cold weather combat system, resulting in four main styles of fishtail parka: the EX-48, M-48, M-51 and the M-65. The M stands for model, and the number is the year it was standardized. The EX-48 model was the first prototype or "experimental" precursor to all of them. The M-48 then being the first actual production model fishtail parka after the pattern being standardized on December 24, 1948. The name fishtail comes from the fish tail extension at the back that could be folded up between the legs, much like a Knochensack, and fixed using snap connectors to add wind-proofing. The fishtail was fixed at the front for warmth or folded away at the back to improve freedom of movement when needed. The EX-48 parka is distinctive as it has a left sleeve pocket and is made of thin poplin, only the later production M-48 parkas are made of the heavier sateen canvas type cotton. The EX-48 also has a thin fibre glass based liner that is very light and warm, the M-48 has a thicker wool pile liner with an integral hood liner made of wool. Both are distinguishable from any other type of parka by having the sleeve pocket. This was dropped for the M-51 onward. The fur ruff on the hood is also fixed to the shell of an EX-48/M-48 and is of wolf, coyote or often wolverine. The M-48 parka was costly to produce and therefore only in production for around one year. The pockets were wool lined both inside and out. The cuffs had two buttons for securing tightly around a wearer's wrist. The later more mass-produced M-51 parka had just the one cuff button. The liner had a built in chest pocket which again was unique to the M-48 parka.

The next revision was the M-51, made because the M48 was too expensive to mass-produce.

The outer hood of the M-51 Fishtail Parka is integral to the parka shell, an added hood liner as well as a button in main liner make the M-51 a versatile 3 piece parka. The idea behind this 3 part system was to enable a more customisable parka that allowed for easier cleaning of the shell as the hood fur was on the detachable hood liner, not fixed to the shell as in the M-48. It also allowed for both liners to be buttoned in or out depending on the temperature and hence warmth required. It was also cheaper than the M-48 to mass-produce The early M-51 was made of heavy sateen cotton, the same material as the M-48. Later revisions of the M-51 were poplin based. The later liners were also revised from the "heavy when wet" wool pile to a lighter woolen loop or frieze wool design that dried easier and were far lighter. The frieze liners were constructed of mohair and were designed using a double loop system.

The M-65 fishtail parka has a detachable hood and was the last revision. It features a removable quilted liner made of light nylon / polyester batting which are modern synthetic materials. The M-65 fishtail parka first came into production in 1968. These parkas featured synthetic fur on the hoods after an outcry from the fur lobby. As a result, only hoods for these parkas made in 1972 and for one year later have real fur.

Designed primarily for combat arms forces such as infantry, they are to be worn over other layers of clothing; alone, the fishtail parka is insufficient to protect against "dry cold" conditions (i.e. below about -10 °C). As such all fishtail parkas are big as they were designed to be worn over battle dress and other layers.

In the 1960s UK, the fishtail parka became a symbol of the mod subculture. Because of their practicality, cheapness and availability from military surplus shops, the parka was seen as the ideal garment for fending off the elements and protecting smarter clothes underneath from grease and dirt when on the mod's vehicle of choice, the scooter. Its place in popular culture was assured by newspaper pictures of parka-clad mods during the Bank Holiday riots of the 1960s.

However, it is claimed by some that fishtail parks were not seen as fashionable by mods, and they caught on more with the "uncool" general public in the 1970s. Photos of mods wearing the fishtail parkas, so it's claimed, always involved a "weekend at the seaside" and were not within cities.

== Cagoule ==
A cagoule is the British English term for a lightweight, weatherproof anorak or parka, usually unlined and sometimes knee-length. A cagoule could be rolled up into a very compact package and carried in a bag or pocket. It was invented by Noel Bibby of Peter Storm Ltd. in the early 1960s. It may have a full-zippered front opening, or pull over the head like an original anorak and close with snaps or a short zipper, has an integral hood, and elasticated or drawstring cuffs. In some versions, when rolled up, the hood doubles as a bag into which the rest of the coat is pushed. It became very popular in the United Kingdom during the 1970s.

== See also ==
- The Anorak – a play about the Montreal Massacre written and performed by Adam Kelly
- Anorak (slang) – Slang term for someone with an interest in niche subjects
- Capote (garment) – Traditional North American garment
- Goggle jacket – Hooded windproof type jacket
- Hoodie – Sweatshirt with a hood
- Mackintosh (raincoat) – British name for a raincoat made of rubberised fabric
- Yup'ik clothing – Traditional clothing worn by the Yup'ik people of Alaska
