= Yeezy =

Yeezy may refer to:

- Kanye West, whose nickname is Yeezy
  - Yeezy (company), a company owned by West
  - Adidas Yeezy, a former fashion collaboration between Adidas and West
  - Nike Air Yeezy, a former fashion collaboration between Nike and West
  - Yeezy Gap, a former fashion collaboration between Gap and West
- "Yeezy" (song), by Anuel AA, 2016
