= YZY =

YZY may refer to:

- Yeezy (company), a multimedia company and fashion brand
  - Yeezy Gap, a former fashion collaboration between Gap and Yeezy
  - Adidas Yeezy, a former fashion collaboration between Adidas and Yeezy
- YZY (record label), a hip-hop record label
- Zhangye Ganzhou Airport, IATA airport code
