= Garbutt House =

Historic house in California, United States

- U.S. National Register of Historic Places
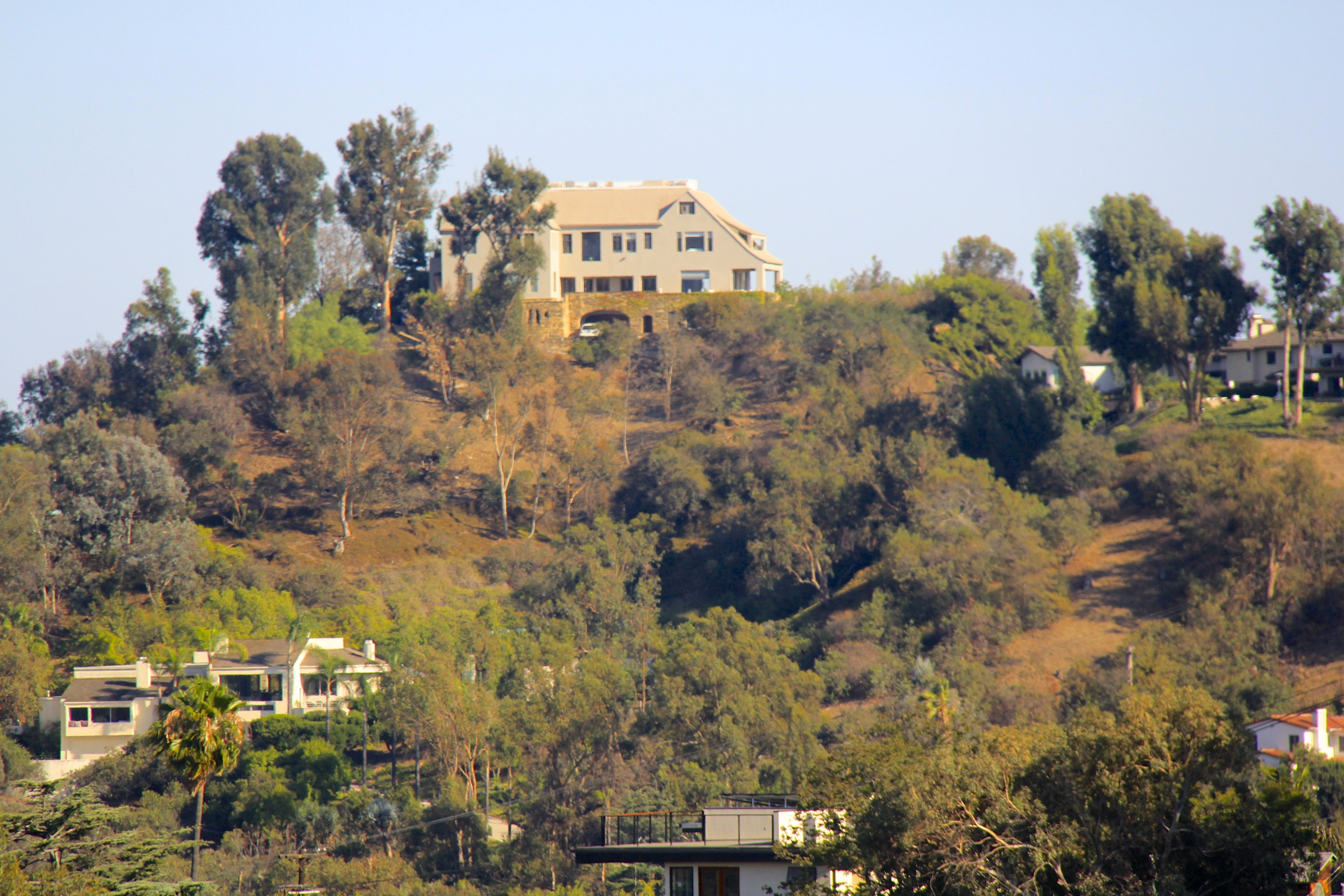
- The house, atop the hill, as viewed from a distance

- Location within the Los Angeles metropolitan area Location within California Location within the United States
- Location: 1809 Apex Ave., Los Angeles, California
- Coordinates: 34°5′23″N 118°15′45″W
- Built: 1926
- NRHP reference No.: 87001174
- Added to NRHP: July 22, 1987

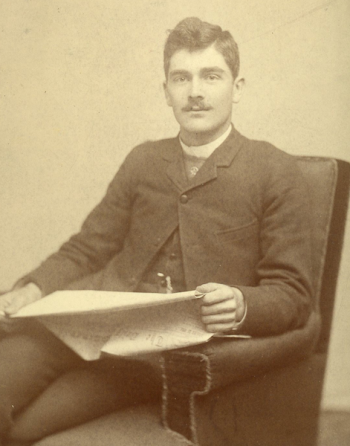
Frank A. Garbutt

Garbutt House is a 20-room mansion in the Silver Lake section of Los Angeles built from 1926 to 1928 as the residence of Frank A. Garbutt. It was listed in the National Register of Historic Places in 1987.

== Frank A. Garbutt ==
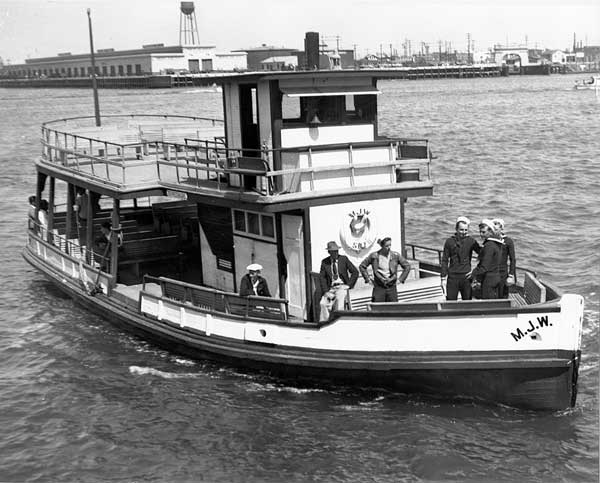
Garbutt's 53-foot ferry M.J.W., which ferried from LA harbor to San Pedro and the west end of Terminal Island in 1918

Frank A. Garbutt, an inventor, industrialist and movie pioneer, was one of the most prominent citizens of Los Angeles in the late 19th and early 20th Century. He invented and secured patents on certain oil drilling tools in the late 1880s that were the initial source of his wealth. Garbutt became involved in other businesses. He owned oil wells and was one of the original investors in aviation pioneer Glenn Martin's aircraft business, later to become Martin Marietta.

He owned interests in a boatbuilding business, Garbutt-Walsh Inc., and a business operating ferries from San Pedro to Terminal Island. He played a role in the founding of Famous Players–Lasky, later Paramount Studios, Union Oil Company and the Automobile Club of Southern California.

== Garbutt House and the Garbutt-Hathaway Estate ==
In 1923, Garbutt acquired a 37-acre (150,000 m^{2}) hilltop site overlooking the Silver Lake reservoir with views of the Pacific Ocean, the Santa Monica and Verdugo Mountains and the downtown skyline. Garbutt and his family built three houses on the site, which came to be known as the Garbutt-Hathaway Estate. Garbutt lived in the 20-room mansion built between 1926 and 1928 that came to be known as Garbutt House. The house has nearly 15,000 square feet (1,400 m^{2}) of space, rises 228 feet (69 m) to its crest and was built like a citadel out of concrete to survive earthquakes and floods, but mostly due to Garbutt's fear of fire.

His daughter Melodile later recalled that the entire first floor was poured in one pouring, that took two days and one night of steady pouring with three shifts of workers. Due to an intense fear of fire, Garbutt even had the roof and walls built of concrete, installed steel-reinforced doors and allowed no fireplaces in the home. A subsequent owner noted that the concrete construction was "comparable to any of the finest bunkers." The house had bronze window frames, hand carved teak and marble floors. The first floor was entirely travertine, and Garbutt hired an artist who spent several months painting the beams in the living room.

Garbutt worked at his inventions at the Silver Lake mansion, building race cars, inventing a soapless detergent, and trying to invent a superior chewing gum.

== Preservation battles and residential development ==
Garbutt died in 1947, but his son and two daughters continued to live at the estate after his death. One of his daughters never married and lived at Garbutt House until 1960, when the estate was sold. Daughter Melodile recalled that they sold the estate after her brother and husband had died, and her sister did not want to live by herself in the big house.

The houses sat dormant for several years as owners battled with the city and preservationists over plans to raze the three houses and build condominiums or a large housing development on the site. In 1975, Los Angeles Times architecture critic, John Pastier, noted that the estate's "arcadian acreage" was 99% undeveloped and "looks like a park." Pastier wrote a lengthy column criticizing a plan to cover the estate with 530 condominium units requiring removal of 60% of the property's trees. He argued for a scaled-back development that would preserve the three houses as a "tesimony to the area's history and to a vanished way of life."

In 1978, two of the houses were torn down to make room for a 100-home development, but the Garbutt House was spared. In 1982, nearly 100 homes were built on the property and were compared to "a village at the foot of the castle." Garbutt House was listed in the National Register of Historic Places in 1987.

== Filming location ==
The Garbutt-Hathaway Estate has long been a popular filming location, dating back to the silent film era. In 1981, a low-budget Carolco horror film called Superstition, about a haunted house on the site where a woman was put to death as a witch 300 years earlier, was shot at Garbutt House. The shooting of Superstition was reportedly subject to incidents of alleged "haunting". A security guard who was required to spend the night in the house quit, after reporting he had seen a "ghost". Another security guard saw the helmet on a Knight's armor display float off the shoulders of the armor and disappear into the kitchen area. In another incident, the film's director was locked in a room when the doorknob fell off and had to be pried free with crowbars.

== Current ownership ==
The mansion is currently owned by American Apparel and Los Angeles Apparel founder Dov Charney, who purchased it in 2006 for US$4.1 million. It was used as temporary lodging for visitors to the company while Charney was chairman. He reportedly added a sculpture of a giant raised middle finger outside the front door. Due to borrowing at least US$20 million in a failed bid to retake American Apparel in 2016, he filed for bankruptcy in 2022, and the estate is one way to pay off the debt. Charney's lawyers have said that the property has 17 liens against it, and selling it wouldn't be even enough to pay for them. Charney told the government-appointed trustee of the estate that there are multiple guests: two of whom are associates of Kanye West (one being Milo Yiannopoulos) and another two being former employees of American Apparel.

== See also ==
- List of Registered Historic Places in Los Angeles
