= Mats Rombaut =

Belgian footwear designer

Mats Rombaut (born 1987) is a Belgian fashion designer and founder of the Paris-based footwear label Rombaut. He is known for using plant-based and recycled materials in his designs.

== Early life and education ==
Rombaut was born in Ghent, Belgium. He initially studied business before relocating to Paris in 2006. He worked at the fashion PR agency Totem and later joined the accessories department at Lanvin. He also worked under designer Damir Doma, focusing on product development and production.

== Career ==
=== Rombaut ===
In 2013, Rombaut launched his namesake footwear brand, Rombaut. The label uses materials including Piñatex (a textile made from pineapple leaves), biodegradable plastics, and recycled fabrics. The brand's products have featured unconventional shapes and silhouettes.

The 2020 collection “Dysmorphia” included sneaker-heel hybrids and was presented alongside a performance on climate change during Paris Fashion Week. In 2021, Rombaut collaborated with Brazilian footwear brand Melissa to reinterpret jelly sandals using bio-based and recycled materials.

=== Puma collaboration ===
In 2025, Rombaut collaborated with sportswear company PUMA on a capsule collection titled "Levitation." The line included footwear designs featuring aerodynamic forms and materials with reduced environmental impact.

=== Yeezy ===
In 2024, Rombaut joined the fashion brand Yeezy as head of footwear. He contributed to the design of new models such as the SL-01 clog, SL-02 low-top sneaker, and SL-03 rubber boot. The products were designed and released on an accelerated timeline and priced to be accessible to a wide audience. Rombaut also worked on supply chain and production processes in China before departing the company in early 2025.

=== Virón ===
In 2020, Rombaut co-founded Virón, a footwear brand focused on circular production methods. The brand has used materials such as recycled canvas, apple leather, and reused rubber. It also introduced a take-back program for used shoes.

== Design approach ==
Rombaut has stated that his veganism informs his material choices and product development. His work has been noted for addressing themes such as sustainability, gender expression, and alternative materials.

== Media coverage ==
Rombaut and his brands have been featured in fashion media including Vogue, Highsnobiety, and Teen Vogue. His footwear has been worn by celebrities including Bella Hadid, Nicki Minaj, and Miley Cyrus.

== Personal life ==
Rombaut lives in Paris, France.

== See also ==
- Sustainable fashion
- Circular economy
