= Hugh Holland (photographer) =

Californian skateboard photographer

Hugh Holland (September 19, 1942 – February 1, 2025) was an American photographer who received acclaim late in life for his skateboard photography featured in major exhibitions and in three published collections : Locals Only (2012), Silver. Skate. Seventies. (2019), and Last Days of Summer (2024). Critics regarded his work as important for capturing skateboarding culture in Southern California in the early 1970s.

For most of his life, Holland pursued photography as a hobby with no plans for publication. His work didn't gain notoriety for more than 30 years until a small exhibit of his photos was noticed by American Apparel founder Dov Charney. Charney approached Holland to include some of his skateboard photography in promotional displays in American Apparel stores. For Holland it was the first time he realized that his work might have an appeal to a large audience.

In subsequent years, his work would be published in several collections and was included in the first major U.S. museum survey of graffiti and street art in a group exhibition entitled "Art in the Streets" at the Museum of Contemporary Art (MOCA) in Los Angeles in 2011.

He died in February 2025 in Torrance, California at the age of 82.

== Early life ==
Born in Hazel Green, Kentucky, Holland was the son of missionaries for the Disciples of Christ, a mainline evangelical church in the United States and Canada. During his childhood, Holland and his three brothers—David, James, and Ray—moved frequently as a result of their parents' missionary duties. Tulsa, Oklahoma, was one of the family's last stops before Holland left in 1966 to live in Los Angeles. In interviews he said he packed up a red Chevy Bel Air and followed Route 66 to Southern California. He recalled that many youth in Tulsa, inspired by songs like The Mamas & the Papas' hit 1965 single "California Dreamin,' " had a strong interest in moving to the West Coast.

Of that interest, Holland said, "There was a lot of movement going on, a lot of people were leaving. Boy, I didn't know any young people my age or younger in Tulsa who didn't want to go out to California. Everyone wanted to go."

Holland's move to Southern California was the beginning of his travels. During the 1960s, Holland also spent a year in Spain and then in Mexico. A lower cost of living, especially in Puerto Vallarta and Guadalajara, enabled him to live inexpensively, and his interest in photography grew while he was there. This period resulted in an early series of Holland's photographs of Mexican life that were never collected in a book or for a gallery show.

== Self-study and influences ==
Holland settled in Southern California in the late 1960s and took a job as a decorative furniture finisher in Hollywood (he would later own his own shop). He said that he considered his work as an antique finisher as a form of creative expression, but he was eager to find a more creative outlet as a photographer. He converted a room in his apartment into a darkroom and started taking photos with a friend's 35mm SRL East German Praktica.

Holland had no formal photography training. Except for some time spent working in a college photo lab, he practiced on his own and studied the work of Henri Cartier-Bresson. In interviews he said that he aspired to imitate Cartier-Bresson, who pioneered the genre of street photography. Cartier-Bresson was known for his candid photography and was an early user of 35 mm film. Cartier-Bresson explained that the purpose of photography was to capture what he called "a decisive moment." That approach appealed to Holland. Of Cartier-Bresson's photography, he said, "I've always admired his street photography and the other street photographers of the '30s and '40s. They weren't stuck in a studio. They were out on the streets, looking for special moments. That's what I wanted to do."

== Skateboard photography ==
Holland started out with posed photos of friends. In the summer of 1975, Holland was driving in the Hollywood Hills on Laurel Canyon Boulevard above Sunset Boulevard when he noticed movements along the side of the road. As he told interviewer Nick Owchar in an interview in Last Days of Summer, Holland saw human heads moving between the bushes on the roadside and realized they were skaters riding in a drainage basin that ran along the road at a lower level, which is why he could only see their heads.

The state was experiencing heavy droughts in the mid-1970s, and these basins were dry and empty—which provided ideal spots for skateboarders. The drought also coincided with the development of urethane wheels which revolutionized skateboarding. The wheels were more durable than clay wheels and allowed skateboarders to climb up the side of a basin or an empty swimming pool the way a surfer climbs a wave.

In interviews Holland said he admired the grace and spontaneity of skateboarding and realized that this would become the subject of his street photography. He spent the next three years (1975–1978) driving around the Southland, recording everything about skate culture—he photographed skaters in empty swimming pools, drainage ditches, and schoolyards—and often served as a taxi for the ones who weren't old enough to drive.

His photography features several people who would go on to future success in skateboarding and other sports, including Danny Kwock, Stacy Peralta, Jay Adams, and second generation Z-boy Solo Scott.

== Equipment and method ==
Holland's photography in For Locals Only, Silver. Skate. Seventies, and Last Days of Summer uses both color and black-and-white film. On the practical side, Holland said that black-and-white film was cheaper than color; in some situations he believed that black-and-white film served his compositions better.

Holland's use of black-and-white film included Kodak Tri-X, which was a faster speed film that enabled him to catch action in low-light situations. He would push up the speed from 400 to 800 (or much higher) to create a graininess that added to the scene's composition. He also shot with Plus-X, which was slower and best for moments when the skaters weren't moving fast. For color, Holland preferred to use repackaged color movie film as well as Kodachrome or Ektachrome. Holland's lenses included a 17 mm Canon for wide-angle shots; an 85 mm, which was a longer lens; and a Mamiya twin-lens reflex 2 ¼ that was better for taking portraits than capturing action. The day he saw the skateboarders in Laurel Canyon, he was using a Pentax 35 mm. He soon switched to a Canon EF. All of his skateboard photos were taken with Canon cameras.

Of his strategy for capturing skateboarders in exciting poses, Holland said, "There was always a climactic moment, a little pause, when they'd skate up and reach the lip of a pool or a ditch, and that was the moment to take the picture. I learned to watch for that moment, but it took time. I was learning, I was testing myself, and what moves me about my work is that the images are a record of my development as a photographer. No one else might see it this way, but I can. I can tell you which images were taken when I was just starting out and the ones taken later when I felt more assured, when I finally knew what I was doing."

== Exhibitions and publications ==
Holland's work has been noted for filling in a gap in what amateur skateboarding culture in Southern California looked like in the mid-1970s. Skateboarding was already undergoing a significant shift into something more professional and commercial in the years Holland was taking his pictures. Notable for chronicling this change was Craig Stecyk III in the pages of SkateBoarder magazine. But Holland navigated around this to focus on the ordinary kids and the ordinary moments of skateboarding before everything took off.

One of the first to recognize the appeal of Holland's photography was American Apparel founder Dov Charney, who saw Holland's photos in a small Bay Area exhibit in the early 2000s. Charney asked Holland to let him use some of the photos in his stores. Holland said Charney's interest made him realize that his work might appeal to a large audience. Holland's photos started to appear in American Apparel stores in 2005.

Around the same time, hotelier Benjamin Trigano, owner of the M+B Gallery in West Hollywood, asked Holland to host a one-man show of his work: "I grew up in France and there was this whole fascination with California's street culture. Hugh's photos embody all of that. There's this innocence and this sense that you're glimpsing a moment of perfection."

That exhibition, titled Angels, was first shown at M+B in early 2006. Following the success of the show, his work was shown internationally in London, Paris, and New York, among other places. In 2010, Holland's first book, Locals Only, was published by AMMO Books in conjunction with his second exhibition at M+B. In 2011, the Geffen Contemporary at the Museum of Contemporary Art (MOCA) in Los Angeles included Holland's work in "Art in the Streets," a group exhibition of graffiti and street art. The exhibition featured sixty artists and was curated by Jeffrey Deitch, Roger Gastman, and Aaron Rose. Among the many mini exhibitions was an entire wall devoted entirely to Holland's photography.

== Critical response ==
Holland's work has been featured in The Wall Street Journal, The Guardian, NPR, and the Los Angeles Times. His work has been praised for its authenticity and nostalgic appeal. The Los Angeles Times called Locals Only a "celebration of youth," while Men's Journal praised it for capturing "the short shorts, big hair, and sick tricks that defined Southern California's '70s skateboard culture."

Of Silver. Skate. Seventies, The Golden Rays said Holland's photos "offer a rare and beautiful snapshot of Southern California kids kick starting a cultural phenomenon that would go on to permeate every aspect of youth culture." Similarly, Last Days of Summer was reviewed favorably for showcasing iconic skateboard images "while also uncovering unseen gems."

Of Holland's photography, former skateboarding champion and artist Ed Templeton has said, "There have been a lot of people photographing the skate world, but most of that fades over time. The ones who captured a certain period of time in skating and have had their work shown in the art world is smaller. You can probably count them on one hand. Hugh's one of them."

== Later years ==
By the late 1970s, as skateboarding grew more commercialized, Holland lost interest in documenting it. What had fired his enthusiasm was something primal that he felt was getting lost in the surging popularity and promotions around skateboarding: "And that's not what my photos were about. They were about capturing all those long-haired, shirtless, shoeless, wild kids ravaging through the streets. That had been wonderful, and I think I just came away at some point and realized I'd done enough."

In the 1980s and 1990s, he continued to work as a furniture finisher and shared his photography with friends and acquaintances who urged him to share it with the public. In his retirement, the attention he received in exhibitions and from publishers surprised Holland: "I'm not an overnight success, that's for sure. I never imagined anything like this. I never expected success of any kind at all. To be perfectly honest, I had no plan, no ambition when I was taking these photos. I was doing it just for the fun of it, for the adventure. To see what's happened now with my photos just amazes me. It really does."
