= Nike Air Yeezy =

Footwear collaboration project by Nike and Kanye West

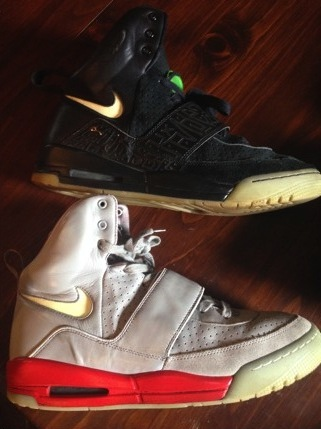
- Air Yeezy samples
- Type: Sneakers
- Inventor: Nike, Inc. and Kanye West
- Inception: 2008; 18 years ago
- Manufacturer: Nike
- Available: No
- Last production year: February 9, 2014
- Models: Air Yeezy, Air Yeezy II

The Nike Air Yeezy is an official sneakers collaboration project between Nike and Kanye West, launched in 2009. Notable as the shoe brand's first non-athlete full collaboration, the project has released two editions: the "Air Yeezy" (2009) and the "Air Yeezy II" (2012 and 2014).

== Models ==
=== Air Yeezy ===
The Nike Air Yeezy was developed from 2007 to 2009 by rapper Kanye West, Nike Creative Director Mark Smith and later Nathan Van Hook. Kanye has spoken very highly of Smith as both a collaborator and designer. Smith has said the same of Kanye, stating that he is "a truly creative talent" and a "natural designer."

The design process for the Nike Air Yeezy was long and features dozens of sample colorways and silhouettes. Inspiration behind the line notably include the Air Tech Challenge II, Jordan III and IV. The early prototype of the Air Yeezy had many features that greatly differ from the release version of the shoe. For instance, the midsole and outsole featured what the shoe's creators referred to as "Death Star" tooling, named for the large spherical shape on the back half of the midsole. The outsole also featured the "Y-print" that was used on the toe box of the three release versions. Also, on the very early prototypes, the shoe used LED lights implanted in the outsole, but after issues with low battery life and cost evaluation, production staff at Nike came to the conclusion that phosphorescent rubber would be used in place of the LED lights.

While several color and wear test samples of the Nike Air Yeezy were made, some are more widely known and discussed than others. West wore an all black suede pair during his 2008 Grammy Awards performance of "Stronger" and "Hey Mama." Up until after his performance, the public was unaware that a collaboration between Nike and Kanye West was in the works. This sample was later sold via an online charity auction to benefit the patients of the Doernbecher Children's Hospital alongside an unreleased prototype of the Nike Air Yeezy featuring the tooling used on the popular Air Jordan VI. Mark Smith stated that Kanye wanted to use Jordan tooling on the Air Yeezy, but that Nike would not allow it, and therefore, before the date of the auction, Kanye was unaware that the "Jordan VI" Nike Air Yeezy sample existed. The other sample that was met with much discussion among fans of the shoe was the "Fire Red" Nike Air Yeezy, which was named for the bright red color on the midsole. This colorway was first worn by Kanye during his "Glow in the Dark" Tour and has been worn by the rapper several times since. According to industry rumors, this colorway was strongly considered for release alongside the other 3 release colorways, but was scrapped at the last minute.

After the long sampling process, three colorways of the Nike Air Yeezy were chosen for public release; a "Zen Grey" colorway that released on April 4, 2009, and was the colorway that was created after almost equal input from Smith and West, a "Black/Pink" colorway (sometimes referred to as the "Blink" colorway) which was more the brainchild of Mark Smith and released on May 4, 2009, and finally a "Net" colorway that reflected more of Kanye West's design tastes and released on June 1, 2009. Each colorway had a suggested retail price of $215 and sold out almost immediately.

In early 2020 while speaking to GQ, West stated that he was open to the idea of a retro release of the Air Yeezy line.

=== Air Yeezy II ===
Anticipation around the release of the Nike Air Yeezy 2 started after a Complex Magazine interview with Mark Smith and Kanye West about designing the Nike Air Yeezy, wherein Kanye stated that there were several designs left over from the Air Yeezy design process that could eventually become the Nike Air Yeezy 2. Despite this statement, none of these designs were used for the Air Yeezy 2, and instead, Nathan VanHook sat down with Kanye to design the Yeezy 2. The shoe features much more of an animalistic design inspiration than the original Air Yeezy, sporting a ridged, reptile inspired heel counter and a snake skin inspired design on the quarters. The shoe, like the original Air Yeezy, borrows tooling from other Nike models. The Air Yeezy 2 borrows its sole unit from the popular Nike Air Tech Challenge II tennis model. The shoe also features several references to Egyptian culture, featuring depictions of the god Horus on the tongue and insole, and using Egyptian hieroglyphics that spell out "YZY" under the strap.

There were also several design decisions during the making of the Nike Air Yeezy 2 that were a direct response to some of Kanye's issues with the initial Nike Air Yeezy. Firstly, unnecessary padding along the upper was eliminated, and the shoe was made shorter for greater mobility. Also, the shoe was purposely slimmed down, to create a thinner look on feet and better fit Kanye West's foot.

As with the original Nike Air Yeezy, several sample colorways were created, the most famous of which was the "Kobe" or "Cheetah" Nike Air Yeezy 2 sample which was based on a popular Christmas colorway of the Nike Kobe VII. Aside from the rumored three pairs in existence and the pictures of the aforementioned sample that spread through various sneaker media sources, very little is known about the sample.

Following a series of high-profile teases of the shoe (including rapper Jay Z exclaiming "Shoutout to my Yeezys, Yeezy 2s" during a March 2012 SXSW performance), Nike announced the Air Yeezy II sneaker on May 29, 2012. The shoe was released on June 9, 2012. While it had a retail price of $245, preorder bids on eBay reached as high as $90,000. The Air Yeezy II was available in two colors, platinum and black, and was later released in an all-red colorway known as "Red October", which were released on February 9, 2014.

== Record sale ==
In April 2021, the Nike Air Yeezy 1 prototypes, worn by West during his 2008 Grammys performance, sold for a record $1.8 million. The Air Yeezy 1 prototypes beat the previous sneaker sale record which was held by a pair of Nike Air Jordan 1s that auctioned for $615,000. Additionally, the Air Yeezy 1 prototypes became the first pair of sneakers to top $1 million in a sale. Brahm Wachter, head of streetwear and collectibles at Sotheby's, stated the price "speaks volumes of Kanye's legacy as one of the most influential clothing and sneaker designers of our time, and of the Yeezy franchise he has built which has become an industry titan."

== See also ==
- Adidas Yeezy
- Yeezy Gap
