= Yeezy (company) =

Multimedia company founded by Kanye West

Yeezy LLC
- Type: Private
- Industry: Clothing; footwear; news
- Founded: April 27, 2016; 10 years ago in California, U.S.
- Founder: Kanye West
- Number of employees: 34 (2020)
- Website: yeezy.com

Yeezy LLC (often stylized as YZY) is a multimedia (Note: Yews, Yeezy's news site, has not been active since March 27, 2025.) and fashion company founded by rapper, designer, and entrepreneur Kanye West. The company was registered in Delaware on April 27, 2016.

Most notable for its brand, Yeezy has collaborated with several fashion companies, including Adidas, which produced the Adidas Yeezy sneaker line, and Gap. After these collaborations were terminated due to West's antisemitic comments in 2022, he continued to develop Yeezy as an independent company, focusing on minimalist design with clothing and footwear products.

== Brand ==
The brand's globe logo since 2013.

Yeezy is an American fashion brand founded by West on August 6, 2013. Most famous for its associated clothing line, it first began producing clothing in 2015 during and for its Yeezy Season 2 runway show. The brand was incorporated into the company in 2016 after its registration.

Yeezy has collaborated with many other large brands, including Gap and Adidas. Yeezy's partnership with Adidas ended prematurely in October 2022 after Adidas terminated the contract, following West's antisemitic remarks on Twitter. Yeezy's partnership with Gap ended after West terminated the contract following a month-long disagreement. Since then, the brand has been selling its clothes independently on its website, yeezy.com.

=== Yeezy Season ===
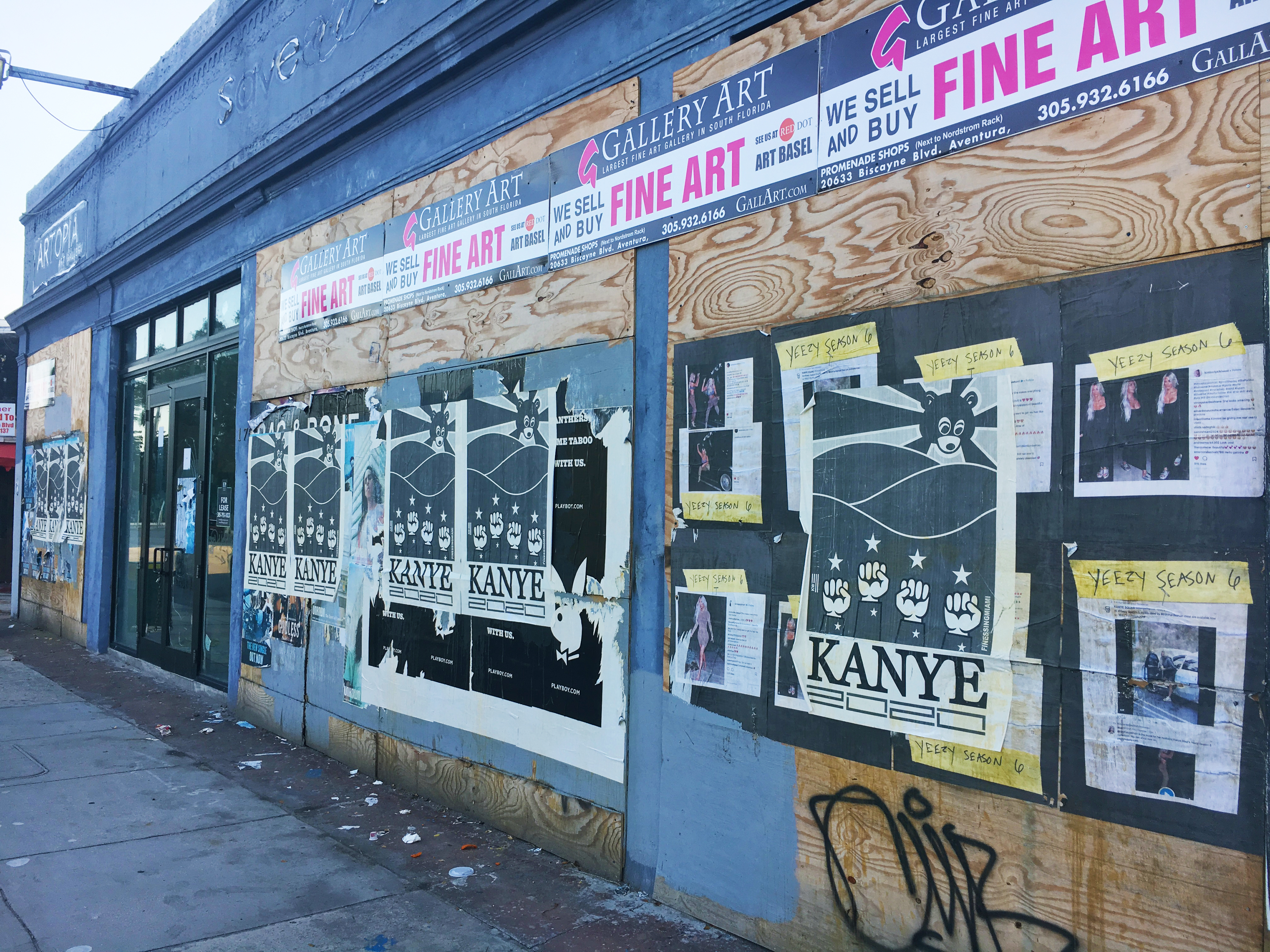
Promotional posters for Yeezy Season 6 in 2018.

Yeezy Season (stylized as YZY SZN) is a runway fashion line created by Yeezy.

Yeezy Season 1 debuted at New York Fashion Week on February 12, 2015. It was a collaboration with Adidas, however, all garments were produced independently, mostly of which by Los Angeles Apparel, with only shoes being produced by Adidas.

Yeezy Season 2 also debuted at New York Fashion Week on September 15, 2015. Influenced by Japanese workwear, the collection was praised for strong silhouettes and diverse casting.

Yeezy Season 3 debuted in Madison Square Garden on February 12, 2016. The collection debuted with West's The Life of Pablo album and was host to many viral moments, including having fellow rappers Lil Yachty and Young Thug being some of the models.

Yeezy Season 4 debuted at the Franklin D. Roosevelt Four Freedoms Park in New York City, and was predominantly a womenswear collection with appearances from Sofia Richie, Teyana Taylor and Chanel Iman.

Yeezy Season 5 debuted at Pier 59 in New York City during New York Fashion Week. The collection introduced new graphical references and sportswear attires, a departure from the oversized silhouettes and post-apocalyptic influences of previous ranges. The much anticipated Calabasas-branded items were debuted, along with a new pair of retro-inspired chunky runners. The three stripes logo was featured on several pieces.

Yeezy Season 6, unlike other seasons, opted out of a runaway show for its debut. Instead, Kim Kardashian unveiled the collection on December 5, 2017, through a series of photos on social media. The collection featured jackets, hoodies, shorts, sweats, trench coats, and more.

Yeezy Season 7 also had Kardashian as the main model, sporting a neon color palette.

Yeezy Season 8 debuted in 2020 at Paris Fashion Week. The show featured raw, textured garments with a neutral color palette, and materials such as wool from West's Wyoming ranch were used.

Yeezy Season 9 debuted at Paris Fashion Week on October 3, 2022, and was streamed on YouTube. The collection featured oversized ponchos, 3D printed boots and a controversial shirt with Pope John Paul II on the front and a White Lives Matter print on the back, worn by multiple models including Selah Marley. Naomi Campbell walked on the runway at the fashion show, soundtracked by unreleased song by West and English musician James Blake titled "What I Would Have Said At Virgil's Funeral" in reference to the deceased Virgil Abloh. West stated: "There's just people. From the same planet. And sometimes, in high school, it feels like we don't fit in. And in a situation like this, we have the opportunity to come together to express who we are."

Yeezy Season X debuted at 10 p.m. on May 1, 2023 in Los Angeles at 8025 Melrose Avenue, at a private event called "YZY Free." The Yeezy Season was executive produced by Pur3 Branding and both its founders. Pur3 Branding–which is a subsidiary of Pur3 Inc, a Los Angeles-based clothing company–was in charge of developing and manufacturing.

The show hosted many male and female models with shaved heads wearing skin-tight white T-shirts and black stockings. Part of the show involved the models standing at attention and placing candles on a center table. The T-shirts were later given out to the public. West was notably absent, leaving after the initial setup of the event, and wearing a retro Manchester United jersey.

Some samples of pieces from Yeezy Season 10 have surfaced online via collectors, and was confirmed on Twitter on April 3, 2025, when West replied to a fan stating "YEEZY SEASON 10 with [sic] SHAYNE OLIVER." On May 13, West posted a photo of a black deodorant stick with the caption "YZYSZNX MRCH3125 DRDRNT".

On May 21, West released the single "Alive" featuring YoungBoy Never Broke Again. West first released the song on Instagram, with the caption "ALIVE YE X NBA YoungBoy YZY SZN 10," likely implying the song was going to be a part of Yeezy Season 10. On May 23, West posted a photo on Twitter of him dressed up in all black clothes with the caption "THIS THAT NEW SEASON 10." During his July 12 concert in Shanghai, West was seen wearing a shirt with the text "SZN X." Several items from the YZY Free event were later put up for sale on the official Yeezy website. The website was shut down on February 11, 2025 and was reinstated on August 9, 2025.

On November 4, 2026, West debuted the next installment with Yeezy Season 01 at the brand's new brick-and-mortar flagship store Droam 1 in Los Angeles. The spectators at Yeezy Season 01's runway show included 2 Chainz, Kid Cudi, Big Sean, Natalie Nunn, N3on, and West's children. Among the runway models was Nettspend. The show included various unreleased songs by West, including "Out of My Mind" and an untitled track with the line "I went through your phone."

=== Adidas Yeezy ===
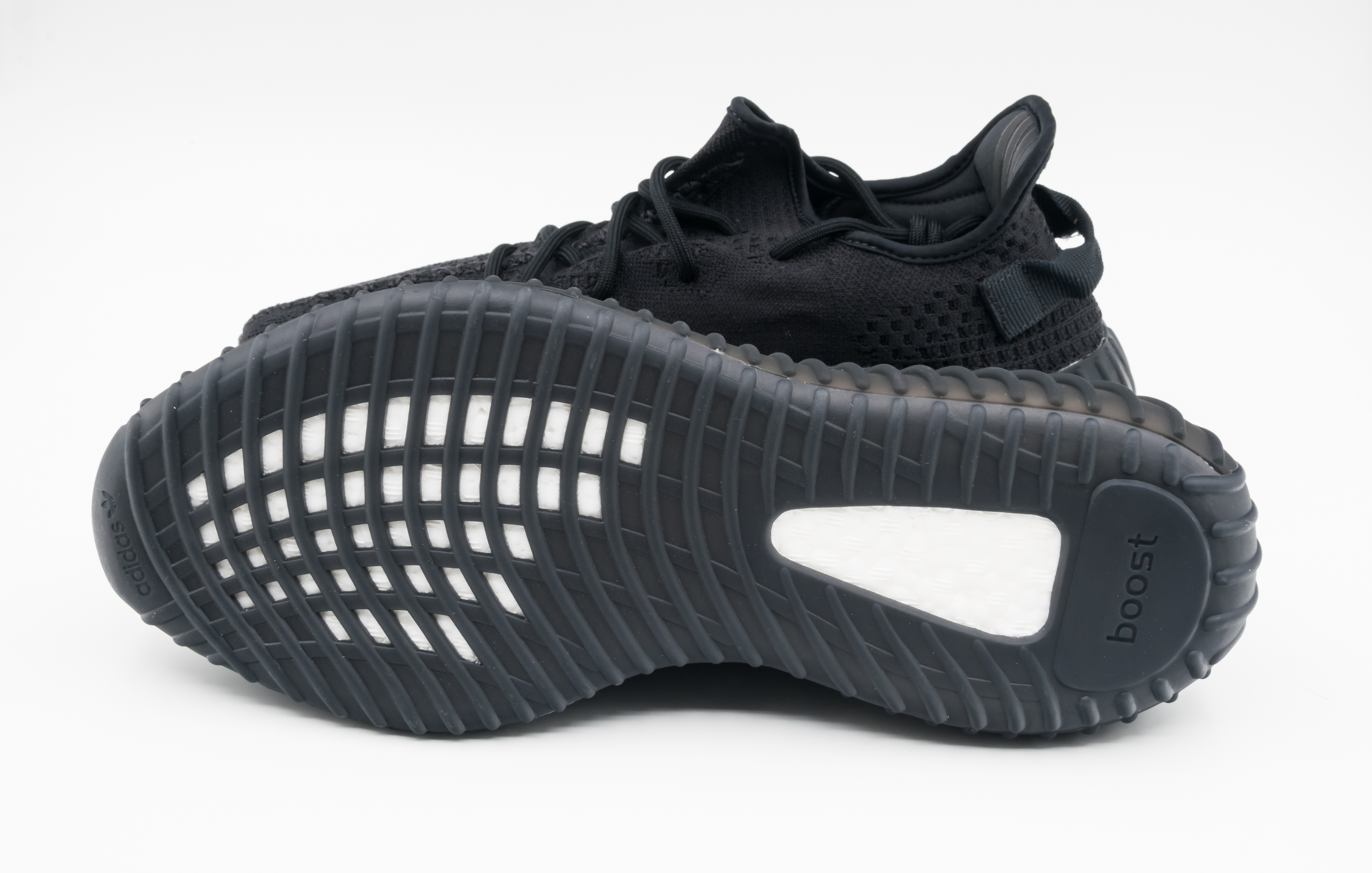
Yeezy Boost 350 V2 shoes

Adidas Yeezy (or just Yeezy) was a fashion collaboration between Yeezy and the German sportswear company Adidas. Announced in February 2015, its first wave of clothing releasing that same year.

Adidas Yeezy included sneakers, shirts, jackets, track pants, socks, slides, lingerie and slippers. It was described as being the "most influential sneakers" by GQ in 2016 and its popular rise as being "one of the great retail stories of the century" by Forbes in 2020.

Adidas Yeezy was terminated in October 2022 immediately after West had made antisemitic remarks through various media outlets. Adidas announced an immediate end to the line on the 25th, saying West's "recent comments and actions have been unacceptable, hateful and dangerous, and they violate the company's values of diversity and inclusion, mutual respect and fairness."

=== Yeezy Gap ===
Yeezy Gap logo

Yeezy Gap (stylized as YEEZY GAP or YZY GAP) was a fashion collaboration between Yeezy and the American clothing company Gap announced in June 2020, with its first wave of clothing releasing a year later in June 2021. In January 2022, the brand announced its collaboration with luxury fashion house Balenciaga, with the first collection from that line releasing the following month.

Yeezy Gap was characterized by minimalist and utilitarian design, echoing previous Yeezy collections designed by West. It consisted of "elevated" basic clothing, including hoodies, tracksuits, and jackets. The line was met with generally positive critical and commercial reception, although some criticized the manner in which it was released.

Yeezy Gap was terminated two years after its announcement in September 2022 after a series of disagreements between West and Gap executives. On February 22, 2024, West released several items from the collaboration on yeezy.com in Europe and Asia, seemingly without permission from Gap.

== Website ==
Following West's antisemitic remarks in late 2022, Yeezy's brand's Gap and Adidas collaborations were terminated. During this time, West went on multiple podcasts doing interviews, blaming Gap and Adidas for not reaching the affordable price points he wanted. On December 13, 2023, he named Gosha Rubchinskiy as Head of Design at Yeezy via X. On December 15, 2023, the Yeezy Pods, a sock-shoe hybrid, and a small selection of other items were available on West's website varying prices, with the Yeezy Pods retailing for US$200. Then, on February 11, 2024, the price of Yeezy Pods were lowered to US$20, with refunds of US$180 being issued to people who bought them for the original price. Later that day, West posted a text message from collaborator and political commentator Milo Yiannopoulos on Instagram, stating that West sold 260,000 pairs of Pods.

Following this, on February 22, 2024, West released several items from his terminated Yeezy Gap collaboration on the yeezy.com website exclusively in Europe and Asia, seemingly without permission from Gap. The items were sold for US$20, lower than typical Yeezy Gap prices. On the same day, he premiered a Super Bowl advertisement for the website, which was a low budget phone recording of West speaking in his car.

Several items available for purchase from February 7 to 9, 2025, including a swastika t-shirt (HH-01), several collaborations with Sean John (FP-01), and shirts reading "White Lives Matter" (WLM-01 and WLM-02)

On February 7, 2025, following West sharing a controversial string of posts on Twitter, many of which were deemed as homophobic, ableist, and misogynistic. Multiple new clothing items were released onto the website, including a T-shirt collaboration with the brand Sean John, owned by Sean "Diddy" Combs, an infamous music mogul who was recently charged with sex trafficking, and a T-shirt with the text "White Lives Matter," similar to the one showcased during Yeezy Season 9. The HD-01 series of hoodies shares a design with artwork used for West's unreleased 2015 album So Help Me God. However, it is more likely a reference to a leaked video in which Combs assaulted his then-girlfriend Cassie Ventura who was wearing a hoodie with the same design.

On February 10, 2025, all items were removed from the Yeezy website, and a $20 white shirt featuring a Nazi swastika—which West had previously showcased on social media—was put up for sale as the only available product. This came directly after another ad for Yeezy featuring West recording himself speaking aired during Super Bowl LIX on four local Fox stations (network-owned KTTV in Los Angeles, WTXF-TV in Philadelphia and WAGA-TV in Atlanta, as well as KTVI in St. Louis affiliate), leading millions of viewers to visit the website and be witness to it. The shirt was titled "HH-01," presumably intended as an antisemitic dog whistle for the phrase "Heil Hitler." On February 11, the website went offline. Shopify, the e-commerce company that was used by yeezy.com, told CBS MoneyWatch, "this merchant did not engage in authentic commerce practices and violated our terms, so we removed them from Shopify." According to West, the actions taken by Shopify did not negatively impact his sales, as he claims to have made US$40 million between all his businesses after uploading the "HH-01" shirt. Yeezy.com was brought back online on February 13, with the only content being a scribbled message reading "YEEZY STORES COMING SOON" followed by a drawing of a heart.

On July 10, a Chinese version of the website's Yeezy Supply section was made available to customers who purchased tickets to West's July 12 concert in Shanghai. The site was fully brought back online on August 9, 2025.

=== Clothing ===
Clothing on the website is designed by either West himself, Gosha Rubchinskiy, or Mowalola Ogunlesi. The clothing items are produced by Los Angeles Apparel, whose founder Dov Charney was reportedly tapped to run Yeezy's operations. Items include t-shirts, hoodies, windbreakers, trench coats, shorts, joggers, footwear, and socks. All items are named with an abbreviation denoting the item type followed by a number denoting the variant, such as hoodies being HD-01 and HD-02, and T-shirts being TS-01 and TS-02.

A variety of shoes are sold on the Yeezy site, with notable footwear including the SL-01s, EVA foam shoes resembling slippers; the SL-03s, a pair of boots; the YS-01s, a pair of EVA foam slides previously sold under the Adidas Yeezy partnership as the Yeezy Slides; and the HL-03 high-heeled shoe.

== Yews ==
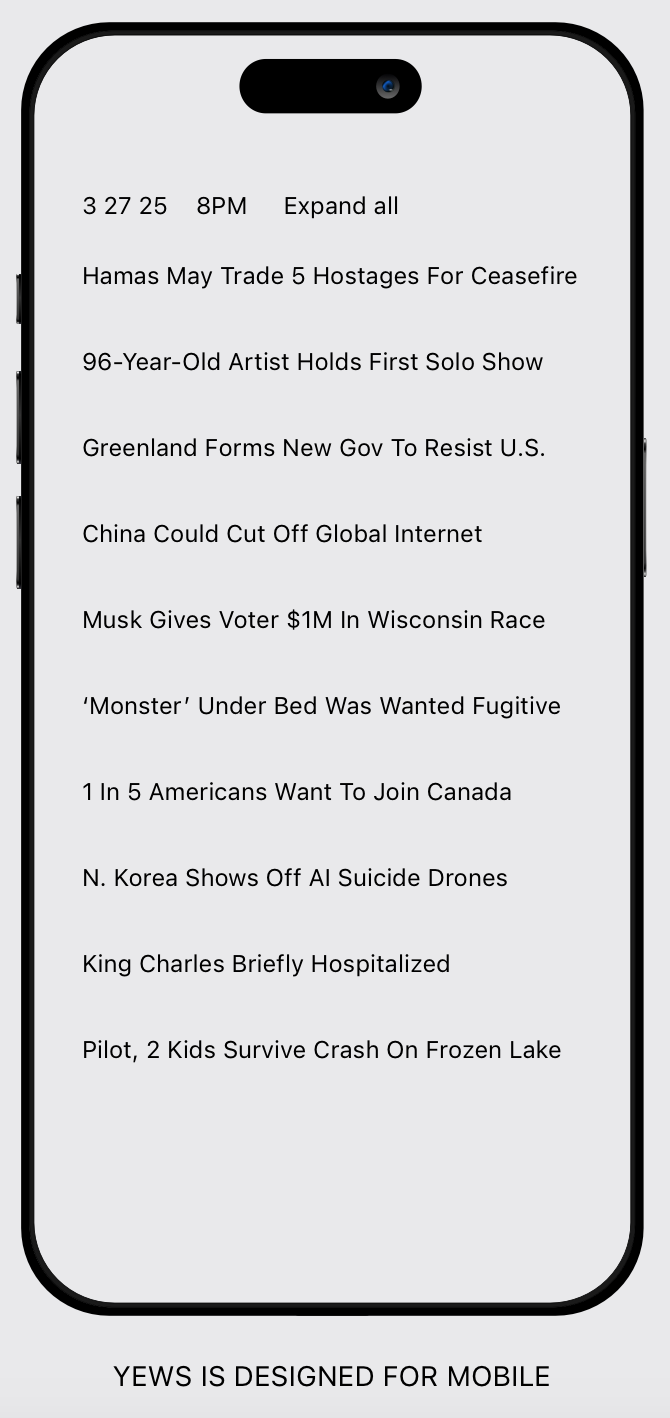
Screenshot of the Yews website in May 2025

Yews (stylized in all caps) was a news website created by Yeezy, which launched on December 13, 2023, with the domain yews.news. West had previously trademarked the name "Yews" for several products and services in October 2023, including clothing, music, beauty products, and general entertainment. The site first launched as a mobile exclusive application on December 13, with two menus, dividing news coverage into "10PM" and "3PM" sections; an "8PM" section was added later on. Topics covered by Yews included sports, politics, fashion, pop culture, and West himself. Each story was accompanied by an illustration, usually religious in nature.

On May 16, 2024, following Chief of Staff Milo Yiannopoulos's termination from Yeezy, Yews was shut down. However, following his return, Yews was reinstated in February 2025 with the new domain yews.live, which was later changed back to yews.news. The website has been inactive since March 27, 2025.

== YZY Money ==
YZY Money (also stylized as YZY MNY) is a cryptocurrency founded by West and built on the Solana blockchain. It was announced via X on August 20, 2025, with a video of West stating "The official Yeezy token just dropped." YZY Money was released alongside a cryptocurrency payment processor, "Ye Pay", and the YZY Card for spending YZY and USDC, a stablecoin which is pegged to the United States dollar. YZY briefly hit a US$3 billion market cap the day it released, before crashing to US$140 million in the following hours. In February 2025, West stated on X that he was offered US$2 million to promote what he described as a fake cryptocurrency, stating that he "said no and stopped working with their [sic] person who proposed it", leading to media outlets raising concern that YZY Money could be a scam. The website has been inactive since August 8, 2026, and official Yeezy products have stopped receiving payments in YZY.

== Unfinished projects ==
=== YZY app ===
In April 2024, after rumors spread that West wanted to create a Yeezy mobile application incorporating music, clothing, and news, Yeezy acquired two startups, YZYVSN (Yeezy Vision) and YZY App, both of which were apps developed by fans competing for West's attention. Both campaigns were conducted on social media. YZYVSN was a team of over 30 people from around the world, including 16 designers, 8 developers, and 10 marketers, some of whom were minors. After purchasing both companies for an undisclosed sum, West planned to merge them into an official YZY application for mobile devices.

On May 1, 2024, the development team presented a finished version of the app to West and Yeezy's Chief of Staff Milo Yiannopoulos. Despite completing the project, the employees were reportedly not compensated for their work, prompting YZYVSN developer Shemar DaCosta, along with seven other individuals, including minors, to file a lawsuit. The lawsuit sought damages for unpaid wages, overtime pay, and emotional distress. West's wife Bianca Censori allegedly sent an employee a file-sharing link containing explicit sexual content that was accessible to minors working on the app, exposing them to inappropriate content during their development on the project. Yiannopoulos stated on behalf of Censori that the allegations were false and misleading. Following this, there have been no announcements regarding the future of the project. On June 20, West's collaborator Ty Dolla Sign announced that their next album, Vultures 2, would be exclusively released on the app during a livestream on Kick. The album was ultimately available on multiple streaming services upon release on August 3.

=== Yeezy Porn ===
Yeezy Porn (stylized as YZY PRN or YZYPRN) was a pornography venture announced by West on April 24, 2024, with a video depicting a blank white screen with the text "YEEZY PORN IS CUMMING 4 24 24." This announcement garnered mostly negative reactions from West's fanbase and was thought to be canceled. In February 2025, West replied to a tweet inquiring about the venture with the statement "it's still cumming". In April 2025, West posted a piece by pornography artist Devin Dickie with the statement "Who is the artist that made this I want to work with them at YZYPRN".

== See also ==
- Donda (company)
- YZY (record label)
- GOOD Music
