= Garbutt-Walsh Inc. =

Shipyard in San Pedro, California, United States

Coordinates: 33.748122°N 118.252902°W

- Founded: 1907
- Founder: Matt J. Walsh (1866 - 1960) and Frank Garbutt (financier)
- Headquarters: San Pedro, California

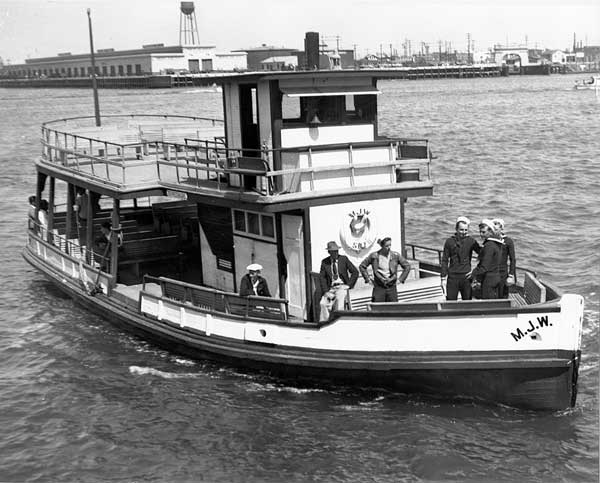
Built in 1918, the 53-foot ferry M.J.W., which ferried from LA harbor to San Pedro and the west end of Terminal Island

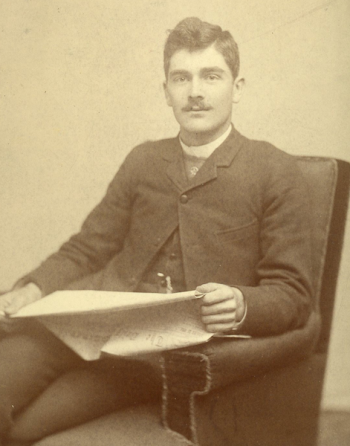
Frank Alderman Garbutt

Garbutt-Walsh Inc. was started in 1907 by Matt J. Walsh (1866 - 1960) and Frank Garbutt (financier) as a boatyard in San Pedro, California on Terminal Island at Berth No. 221. Garbutt-Walsh Inc. built and repaired boats and yachts for pleasure and commercial. President of Garbutt-Walsh Inc. was Matt J. Walsh and Vice President was David J. Walsh. For World War 2 Garbutt-Walsh Inc built powered and non-powered covered and open barges, a Type B ship. The open badge, YGN-44, with a length of 65 feet and a beam of 20 feet, and 300 hp was lost in the war in 1944. The site is now YTI Terminal's Intermodal container port.

Matthew Joseph Walsh was born in Guysborough County, Nova Scotia, Canada in 1866. He came to California in 1899. His first job in California was working for the Los Angeles Railway Company, In 1906 was hired by Frank A. Garbutt as crewmen of his schooner Skidbladnir. One of Walsh first boat building projects was Harry Pidgeon's Inlander, which sailed around the world. Other noted boats: 53-ffor cutter Otter in 1914, 45-ffot sloop Thorobred in 1928, 43-foot sloop Margaret, 27-foot Common Sense in 1933 (built 6 of this 27-footer) and his own 55-foot cruiser Mardo in 1930 for himself, 53-foot ferry M.J.W. for Matthew J. Walsh in 1918, which ferried from LA harbor to dan Pedro and the west end of Terminal Island. Th M.J.W. sank in 1946. Common Sense III 25-foot sailboat built by Garbutt-Walsh Inc. was the smallest bat to sail the Los Angeles to Honolulu, Transpacific Yacht Race. Common Sense III sail in the 1934 race with a Hawaii crew. Halfway in the race her mast was damaged, but she still finished the race. After the race rules were changed and 30-foot min. limit was placed on the boats. Walsh raced his own boats. Walsh's had two big wins: The San Francisco Perpetual Challenge Cup in 1923 with the R-boat California. and the Universal rule R-Class National Championship with Pirate in 1929 during the Larchmont Race Week. Walsh Walsh in 1960 at age 94 in his home at near the Point Fermin Lighthouse.

Frank Alderman Garbutt (1869–1947) was born in Illinois, he is known for being a race-car driver, an entrepreneur, writing short stories and being an athlete. His business was a variety of activities in printing, oil drilling tools, California real estate, building and movie making. He was one of the founders of Union Oil Company. Worked in Hollywood and was Vice President of Famous Players Film Company, which he sold to Paramount Pictures. He was an investor in many new started-ups, having made his money in oil. He was an investor in Glenn Martin's aircraft business that later became Martin Marietta). He also help start the Automobile Club of Southern California Garbutt was a member of both the Los Angeles Athletic Club and the California Yacht Club in 1922). His passion for yachts connected him with Walsh. Garbutt owned the Skidbladnir a large yacht. Garbutt died of a heart attack at age 78.

== Built for World War 2 ==
Built for the US Navy for World War 2 in 1943 covered Lighter, also called covered barges, at 138 tons each and a length of 110 feet.

Hull Type	Hull #	Notes
YFN	402	Later renamed YRB 17
YFN	403	To MARAD in 1947
YFN	404	To MARAD in 1947
YFN	405	To MARAD in 1947
YFN	406	
YFN	407	To MARAD in 1947
YFN	408	
YFN	409	Later renamed YRB 18
YFN	506	To MARAD in 1947
YFN	507	To MARAD in 1947
YFN	508	Later renamed YC 1355
YFN	509	To MARAD in 1947
YFN	510	To MARAD in 1947
YFN	511	Later renamed YRB 13
YFN	512	Sold 1948
YFN	513	To MARAD in 1947
YFN	514	To MARAD in 1947
YFN	515	To MARAD in 1947
YFN	550	To MARAD in 1947
YFN	551	To MARAD in 1947
YFN	552	To MARAD in 1947
YFN	553	To MARAD in 1947
YFN	554	To MARAD in 1947
YFN	555	To MARAD in 1947
YFN	556	To MARAD in 1947
YFN	557	To MARAD in 1947
YFN	558	To MARAD in 1947
YFN	559	Transferred 1947
YFN	560	To MARAD in 1947
YFN	561	
YFN	562	
YFN	563	
YFN	564	To MARAD in 1947
YFN	565	To MARAD in 1947
YFN	566	To MARAD in 1947
YFN	567	To MARAD in 1947
YGN	44	45 tons and 66-foot, Lost in 1944

== See also ==
- California during World War II
- Maritime history of California
