= Mowalola Ogunlesi =

Nigerian-born fashion designer

- Born: 25 March 1994 (age 32); Lagos, Nigeria
- Education: Central Saint Martins
- Occupations: Fashion designer; singer
- Years active: 2017–present
- Notable work: Designed uniforms for Nigeria's World Cup team for Nike; Outfits creator and designer for Skepta's "Pure Water" & JT's "Okay" music videos
- Style: Genderless clothing
- Title: Design director at Mowalola & Yeezy Gap
- Relatives: Adegboyega "Adey" Owunlesi (brother)
- Website: www.mowalola.com

Mowalola Ogunlesi (born 25 March 1994) is a Nigerian fashion designer and singer working and living in London. She is known for working with a wide variety of textiles such as leather and PVC to produce non-traditional silhouettes inspired by Nigerian and London youth culture.

== Early life ==
Ogunlesi was born in Lagos, Nigeria to parents of Yoruba origin. Both of her parents are fashion designers with her mother, Adenike Ogunlesi founding the Nigerian clothing brand Ruff 'n' Tumble, while her father works in traditional Nigerian menswear. At the age of 12, Ogunlesi moved from Nigeria to attend boarding school in the Surrey countryside. Ogunlesi earned her Bachelor of Arts in Fashion at Central Saint Martins - University of the Arts London, debuting a collection at the Graduation Press Show in 2017. She enrolled in the Master of Arts programme at Central Saint Martins that year but dropped out in 2018 to have more creative freedom in her work.

== Career and recognition ==
While enrolled at Central Saint Martins, Ogunlesi received an email that Ye (Kanye West) wished to speak with her; he later reached out to her directly for a lengthy conversation and invited her to his Calabasas studio. She declined to collaborate at the time, preferring to develop her own creative identity, and declined a further approach months later. After leaving Central Saint Martins, Ogunlesi applied to the Fashion East mentorship and support programme. Her 2019 London Fashion Week debut took place on Fashion East's stage.

Ogunlesi came under scrutiny in September 2019 when Naomi Campbell was spotted wearing a Mowalola gown with a bullet wound design. The dress was interpreted as a statement on gun violence, but on Instagram Ogunlesi clarified the garment was meant to convey a sense of being a walking target.

In October 2020, Ogunlesi was named by Elle as one of "10 Trailblazing Women Changing The Future You Need To Know", the others being: Tobi Kyeremateng, Ngozi Onwurah, Simi Lindgren, Balanda Atis, Magdalene Abraha, Koffee, Holly Fischer, Celeste and Margaret Busby.

=== Collaborations ===
In 2019, she created outfits for Skepta's "Pure Water" music video and was one of six designers approached by British Vogue to style Barbie dolls for the brand's 60th anniversary.

On 26 June 2020 the Yeezy Gap 10-year partnership was officially announced, with Ogunlesi appointed by Ye as design director. Ogunlesi’s collaboration with Ye had been hinted at several months before it was officially revealed. The connection first drew public attention when Ye’s ex-wife, Kim Kardashian, shared a now viral Father’s Day photograph featuring the entire family dressed in clothing designed by Mowalola. Ogunlesi was offered the Yeezy Gap position after working on a project focused on North West’s birthday. Mowalola’s appointment was particularly notable as it marked the first time Ye had selected another designer to take the lead on one of his own creative projects. However, Yeezy Gap was short-lived and folded in September 2022 due to disagreements between Ye and Gap, though the two have continued to collaborate on various projects since the end of the deal.

In 2022, she joined with MGA Entertainment as a designer for a line of their Bratz dolls featuring two of the doll franchise's characters: Jade and Felicia. The collaboration line was released on 1 December.

In 2023, Mowalola collaborated with Beats , releasing a pair of Solo3 wireless headphones complete with a campaign featuring JT.

In 2025, she collaborated with Crocs, releasing reimagined pairs of the Bae Clog and Flip Days in Camo and Graffiti prints, as well as a matching bomber jacket

In September 2026, Ogunlesi collaborated with Jordan Brand on a full collection, bringing her own perspective to the Air Jordan 14, introducing the first-ever Air Jordan 14 Mule, and other apparel pieces. The collaboration was presented as the beginning of a long term relationship between Mowalola and the brand. It was accompanied by the campaign “Something’s Off,” photographed by Norbert Schoerner and featuring high end models and artists including Alek Wek.

=== Music ===
Ogunlesi releases music also under the name Mowalola. In 2021, she released two singles, "Truck" and "Wawa". She was later featured on Namasenda's single "Banana Clip" (2021).

In 2024, she directed the visual for JT's single "Okay" and starred in FKA Twigs' music video for "Perfect Stranger".
