= Ruff 'n' Tumble (clothing) =

Nigerian clothing company

- Type: Private company
- Industry: Apparel
- Founded: 1996
- Founder: Adenike Ogunlesi
- Headquarters: Ikeja, Lagos State, Nigeria
- Number of locations: 15 Stores
- Area served: Nigeria
- Key people: Adenike Ogunlesi
- Products: Children's Clothing
- Number of employees: 150+
- Parent: Gatimo Limited
- Website: http://www.ruffntumblekids.com/

Ruff 'n' Tumble is a Nigerian clothing brand that specialises in children's apparel

== History ==
Ruff 'n' Tumble was founded in 1996 when Adenike Ogunlesi needed pyjamas for her kids. Already making clothes for women, she decided to make the clothes with assistance from her mother, a dressmaker. She initially used local materials including Ankara and Adire. Production started and services were later expanded to other Nigerian families with kids. The clothing production (for children from the ages of 0 to 16), gradually progressed from her house (selling from the boot of her car) to a location in Victoria Island, Lagos. Ruff 'n' Tumble operates a ware house, factory, distribution and has more than 50 employees. It has also extended branches to Surulere in Lagos, and Ikeja, as well as, other Nigerian cities, including, Ibadan, Kano and Port Harcourt. The Company has about 15 branch locations across the country. Ruff 'n' Tumble also owns the brands "Trendsetters" and "NaijaBoysz"(a clothing range for young boys aged 8–16). Ruff 'n' Tumble partnered with Nigerian Employers Consultative Association (NECA) and Industrial Training Fund (ITF) to help reduce unemployment in the country.
