= Adidas Yeezy =

Fashion collaboration

Yeezy
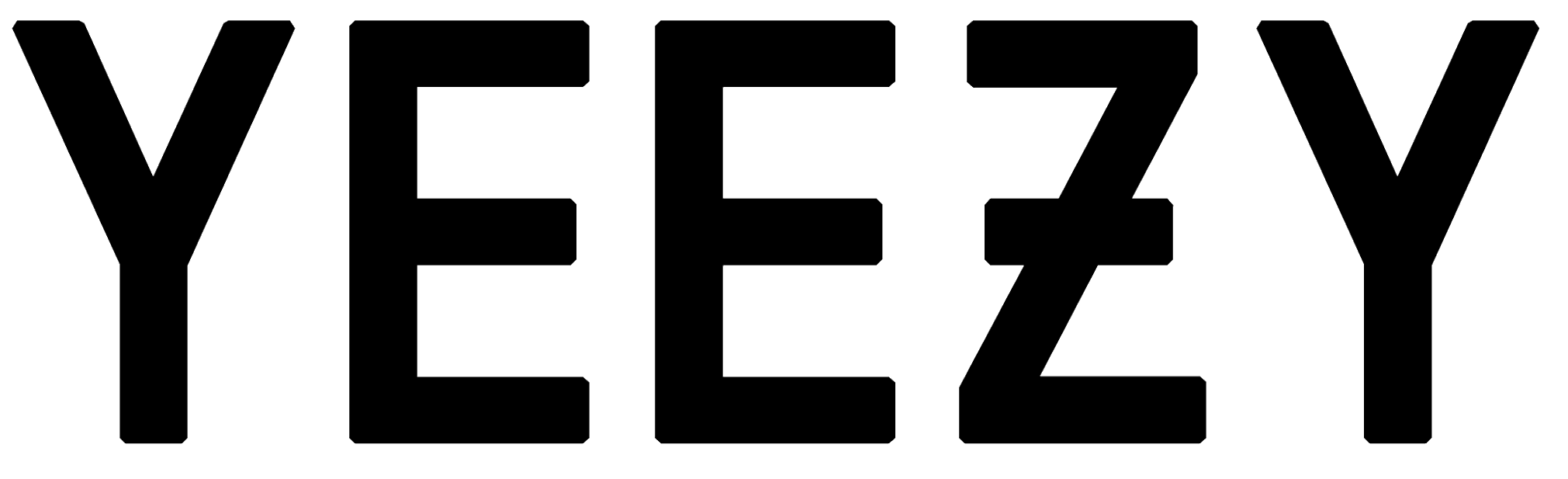

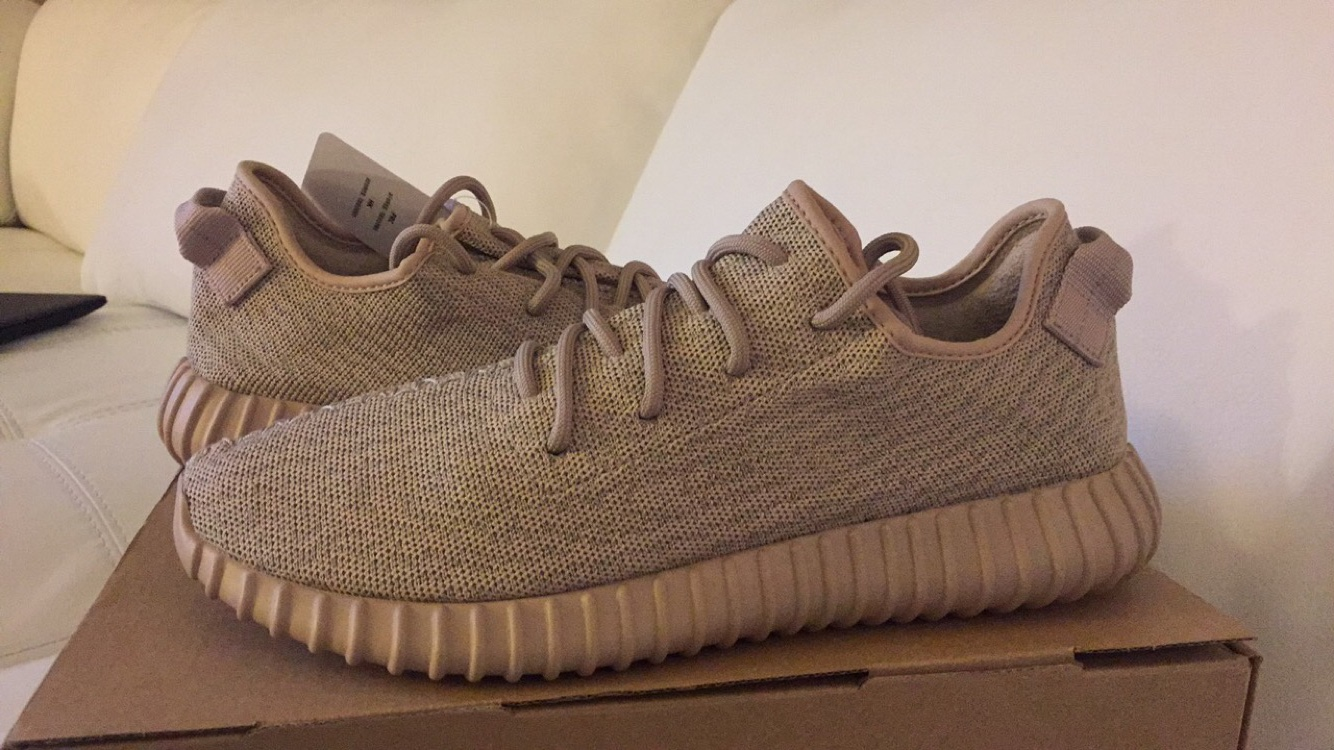
- Type: Clothing, sneakers
- Inventor: Kanye West and Adidas
- Inception: February 2015
- Manufacturer: Adidas
- Available: No
- Last production year: October 2022
- Website: https://www.adidas.com/us/yeezy

Adidas Yeezy (or just Yeezy, stylized as YEEƵY) was a fashion collaboration between American rapper, designer, and entrepreneur Kanye West's (Note: In October 2021, Kanye West changed his legal name to "Ye".) Yeezy and German sportswear company Adidas. It offered sneakers in limited edition colorways, as well as shirts, jackets, track pants, socks, slides, lingerie and slippers. The first shoe model ("Boost 750") was released in February 2015. In 2020, Forbes described Yeezy's rise as "one of the great retail stories of the century". Yeezy influenced and inspired a multitude of other fashion brands. Outside of the former Adidas collaboration, Yeezy is the name of West's company Yeezy LLC and is not connected to Adidas.

In October 2022, Adidas announced that it terminated its collaboration with West, with immediate effect after he insinuated that Adidas could not drop him on an episode of the Drink Champs podcast. The comment was part of a tirade of antisemitic remarks that West made, where he argued that his celebrity status and the popularity of the Yeezy brand made him untouchable by the company.

== History ==
=== Proposed "Pastelle" line and 2006 meeting ===
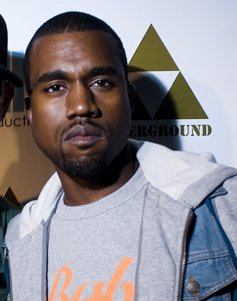
American rapper Kanye West had collaborated with Nike before his partnership with Adidas.

In 2008, it was rumored that Kanye West, as he was then known, was releasing his first brand, Mascotte by K West, to be funded by Roc-A-Wear. He began speaking with Adidas about a collaborative effort in 2006, when Gary Aspden met with him in a recording studio, alongside his manager. West proposed a clothing line called "Pastelle", designed its logos, and discussed the possibility of designing a custom version of the Rod Laver Vintage shoe for Adidas. West designed a shoe for Adidas that year, but talks with the company fell through, and the line was never released.

=== Departure from Nike and deal with Adidas ===
In 2013, after the release of the "Red October" Air Yeezy 2s, West officially left Nike. Although he described this break as "heartbreaking", he claimed that Nike would not pay him royalties for his shoe designs, instead offering to donate some of the proceeds to a charity of his choice. Ultimately, West successfully reached out to Adidas for a deal. Adidas agreed to give him royalties, and West described the CEO of Adidas as "someone who allowed me to build something". Under the partnership with Adidas, West retains 100% ownership of his brand while having full creative control over the products released.

In February 2015, the Adidas and West collaboration officially debuted. "Yeezy Season 1" was highly anticipated and celebrities such as Rihanna, Diddy, and West's then-wife Kim Kardashian were at the introductory fashion show. The line featured heavy inspiration from military designs, which West had stated was driven by 2011 England riots. Bomber jackets, sweatpants, and stylized military jackets were heavily featured in the Yeezy Season 1 collection. While the fashion show started late, many deemed it as a success.

In September 2015, West held a fashion show for a new set of apparel in the Yeezy line, called Yeezy Season 2. Several hundred people were in attendance at the showcase for the line, which critics noted was not particularly dissimilar from the Season 1 line. The line was marked by light pink, tan, army green and olive tones, and featured pieces such as weatherproof boots, sweatpants, cargo jackets, and crew-neck sweatshirts. He later revealed that he began planning the Yeezy Season 2 line the day Yeezy Season 1 launched, and had begun planning his next set of apparel, Yeezy Season 3, not long after the September 2015 showcase. While the line's accompanying shoes were manufactured by Adidas, West opted to manufacture the clothes through other means and have them custom-dyed.

"Yeezy Season 3" also saw notable amounts of success upon their releases. In June 2016, West and Adidas announced an extension of the deal and the launch of a new Yeezy category. West claimed that Yeezy was selling out surprise 40,000-pair drops within minutes.

In 2019, Forbes compared Yeezy to Air Jordan in terms of cultural clout and commercial prowess. In 2020, Forbes described Yeezy's ability to rival Air Jordan for "sneaker world supremacy" within just a short period of time as "one of the great retail stories of the century". West was receiving an 11% royalty cut. That year, sales for the sneakers reached nearly $1.7 billion in annual revenue, netting Yeezy $191 million in royalties alone.

In June 2022, West criticized Adidas CEO Kasper Rørsted, accusing the brand of copying his designs and promoting a "Yeezy Day" sales event without his permission. In August, West continued his criticisms, stating that Adidas failed to open Yeezy retail stores as promised. In September, West stated that he would not renew his contract with Adidas once their partnership expires in 2026.

=== Termination of Adidas partnership ===
On October 7, 2022, Adidas placed its partnership with West under review after he made several antisemitic remarks and wore a "White Lives Matter" T-shirt at a Paris Fashion Week show days earlier. A social media campaign demanding that Adidas cut ties with West began. West continued to make antisemitic remarks through Instagram, Twitter, interviews, and podcasts, stating "I can say antisemitic shit and Adidas cannot drop me". In response to this behavior, Balenciaga, Vogue, Creative Artists Agency and MRC cut ties with West. Pressure on Adidas grew after the Goyim Defense League, an antisemitic hate group, endorsed West. In an investigative report in The New York Times, Megan Twohey obtained hundreds of previously undisclosed internal records and traveled to Portland and Los Angeles to interview current and former employees of Adidas and West. Her investigation uncovered misconduct from the artist dating to 2013.

On October 25, Adidas announced an immediate end to the line, writing: "Ye's recent comments and actions have been unacceptable, hateful and dangerous, and they violate the company's values of diversity and inclusion, mutual respect and fairness." The production of Yeezy-branded products and payments to West ended upon announcement. Yeezy generated $2 billion in annual sales for Adidas, making up around 10% of the brand's total revenue. Adidas said the termination was expected to "have a short-term negative impact of up to $250 million", and warned it could lose $1.3 billion in revenue in 2023. According to Forbes, West's net worth dropped from $2 billion to $400 million because of the deal's end.

In February 2023, Adidas and West reached a deal to sell the remaining $500 million of Yeezy sneakers in 2023. The remodeled contract focused solely on selling the existing inventory of West's shoe line and did not include his clothing line or new designs.

On April 30, 2023, West and Adidas faced a $1 million class-action lawsuit filed by customers alleging they were misled by the limited availability of the Yeezy Boost 350 V2 "Mono Cinder" sneakers. The lawsuit claims that the defendants engaged in deceptive marketing practices by falsely asserting that the sneakers were limited edition, causing consumers to purchase them at inflated prices. The plaintiffs argue that this led to financial damages for consumers when the sneakers became widely available at lower prices later.

In May 2023, Adidas revealed that the termination of its partnership with Kanye West resulted in a loss of €400m (£350m) for the first quarter of 2023. The sales decline was particularly noticeable in North America at 20%. Adidas revealed that they were going to sell the remaining stock of the shoes, with a significant share of profits being donated to charities including the Philonise & Keeta Floyd Institute for Social Change. Since re-releasing the remaining stock of sneakers, there have been three separate sales periods with the latest taking place at the end of May 2024 and throughout the first half of June 2024.

== Clothing ==
"Yeezy Season 1" was released on October 29, 2015, and was the first apparel collection to release from this collaboration. The presentation was designed in collaboration with performance artist Vanessa Beecroft, who has previously worked with West on music videos and set designs. This collection was noted for its stripped-down, ready-to-wear style, which drew on military clothing and flesh-toned colors. The prices ranged from $600 for sweatpants to $3,000 for jackets. Although the footwear sold out quickly, the apparel collection did not. West revealed in a 2018 interview that he was in talks with Louis Vuitton for a $30 million apparel deal. The deal was not approved by the LVMH board and West was left with no clothing partners. After the "Yeezy Season 1" show, Adidas announced it would no longer be a part of Yeezy apparel, instead focusing on the footwear collection with West. Yeezy Season runways and clothing continued to be released independently by West with his brand Yeezy, Although Adidas were involved in producing footwear for Yeezy Season 5 & 6.

== Footwear ==
Adidas Yeezy sneakers were popularized by celebrities including Justin Bieber, Brooklyn Beckham, and Karim Benzema. Most of the shoes utilized Adidas's Boost material.

=== Yeezy Boost 750 ===
On December 3, 2013, Adidas confirmed a new shoe collaboration deal with West. The initial release of the Adidas Yeezy Boost 750 "Light Brown" was limited to only 9000 pairs and sold out within 10 minutes. Between February 21 and 28, the Yeezy Boost 750 "Light Brown" was available through a wider range of retailers and boutiques. "After Kanye West left Nike to partner with Adidas in 2015, he claimed his stake in the sneaker game with his first signature shoe: the Yeezy Boost 750."

=== Yeezy Boost 350 ===
Adidas Yeezy Boost 350 in the "Pirate Black" colorway

On June 27, 2015, the second shoe from the collaboration, the Yeezy Boost 350 was made available through a worldwide release. The Yeezy Boost 350 marked an entry into "primeknit" technology, utilizing flat knitting machinery amalgamated with synthetic yarns. A preliminary version was made of a combination of petroleum-based ethylene-vinyl acetate (EVA) and foam generated from algae. In October 2015, Footwear News recognized the Yeezy Boost 350 with its Shoe of the Year award. In August 2016, GQ recognized Yeezy Boost 350 as the most influential shoe of the year.

On September 24, 2016, a second version of the shoe, known as Yeezy Boost 350 V2, debuted in a colorway called "Beluga".

=== Yeezy 950 ===
The Yeezy 950 was first released on October 29, 2015, at select retail stores and online. It was part of the Yeezy Season 1 collection and came in four different colorways: Peyote, Moonrock, Chocolate, and Pirate black. Each shoe was retailed at $399. The Adidas Yeezy 950 extended the partnership outside of the sneaker space with its military-inspired design.

=== Yeezy 350 Cleat ===
The Adidas Yeezy 350 Football Boost cleat was for football and it had made its first appearance in a 2016 NFL kickoff game. Texans wide receiver DeAndre Hopkins was fined $6,000 for wearing the cleats because they broke the NFL uniform policy by not having a solid base color.

=== Yeezy Powerphase Calabasas ===
The Adidas Powerphase Calabasas was released on March 28, 2017. "The retro sneakers are an update of an Adidas trainer from the '80s. They feature a premium white leather upper with perforated stripes, green Adidas branding, and a red Trefoil logo." A tonal grey colorway released globally on December 9, 2017, for a retail price of $120; a "Core Black" colorway released shortly after on March 17, 2018. After the initial three colorways of the Yeezy Powerphase Calabasas, Adidas continued releasing several Powerphase models without the Yeezy Calabasas branding. Adidas then brought back the 1980s Adidas Trainer model that is "Yeezy-inspired".

=== Yeezy 700 Series ===
The Adidas Yeezy Boost 700 debuted in the "Wave Runner" colorway during the Yeezy Season 5 fashion show in 2017. It featured reflective details, such as the three stripes of Adidas under a mesh overlay, reflective lace holders, and circles in the middle of the shoe and in the back. Different materials used in the shoe include boost for cushioning of the midsole, mesh, herringbone traction on the outsole, and suede. The shoe was released on August 12, 2017, for $300, exclusively via Yeezy Supply. At the time, two colorways of white/gum and black were also expected to release in 2018. The sequel to the Yeezy Boost 700 debuted in the "Static" colorway, an all-white colorway with a black outsole. Also retailing for $300, the upper features a different design, while the midsole and outsole remain the same. The 700 V2 debuted on December 29, 2018.

On March 23, 2019, the 700 V2 "Geode" colorway was released synchronously with a nationwide lemonade stand charity campaign raising money for the National Alliance on Mental Illness. On December 23, 2019, a third version of the 700 series, known as Yeezy 700 V3, debuted in a colorway called "Azael" featuring a glow-in-the-dark cage. Instead of featuring boost like other 700s, the V3s use EVA. They come with reflective 3M Scotchlite detailing around the toe and retail for $200.

A new variation of the 700 series, the Yeezy Boost 700 MNVN (minivan), had a limited release in a colorway known as "Triple Black" on February 8, 2020. The shoe differs by displaying the "700" branding on the upper using compact and reflective materials and comes in more vibrant colors than other 700s, including the "Metallic" colorway.

=== Yeezy 500 ===
The Adidas Yeezy 500 was released in December 2017, as a pre-order with delivery slated for March 2018. The debut colorway was known as "Desert Rat".

A high-top variation of the model, known as the Yeezy 500 High, was released in December 2019. The debut colorway was known as "Slate". The following releases including "Blush", "Enflame" and "Clay".

=== Yeezy Boost 380 ===
The first Adidas Yeezy Boost 380 was released in December 2019, as a surprise release on West's clothing launch site Yeezy Supply. The debut colorway was known as "Alien."

=== Yeezy Slide ===
Adidas Yeezy Slides are lightweight EVA slippers released in December 2019. The silhouette was re-released independently by Yeezy on August 9, 2025, as the YS-01.

=== Yeezy Qntm Bsktbl ===
The Yeezy Qntm Bsktbl was released in the spring of 2020 and serves as a performance version of the Yeezy Qntm (Lifestyle Model) geared for the hardwood.

=== Yeezy Foam Runner ===
The Yeezy Foam Runners were the first Adidas Yeezy shoes made in the United States and first released exclusively through Yeezy Supply on June 26, 2020. The shoes retailed for $75 and was partially made of foam generated from algae. The debut colorway was known as "Ararat Sand".

=== Yeezy 450 ===
The Adidas Yeezy 450 debuted on March 6, 2021, with a debut colorway called "Cloud White", which was later followed by "Dark Slate".

=== Yeezy Knit Runner ===
The Adidas Yeezy Knit Runner (stylized as Knit Rnr) debuted on September 23, 2021, with a debut colorway called "Sulfur." The shoe retailed at US$200. The Knit Runner takes inspiration from the Yeezy Foam Runner silhouette while being predominantly made of knitted material.

=== Yeezy Nsltd Boot ===
The Adidas Yeezy Nsltd Bt (meaning Insulated Boot) debuted on November 5, 2021, with a "khaki" colorway. These boots retailed at US$340.

=== Yeezy Bsktbl Knit ===
The Yeezy Bsktbl Knit released on December 18, 2021, with the 'Slate Blue' colourway and serves as an 'updated' version of the previous Yeezy Qntm basketball shoe. It has a distinctive padded, sock-like upper (not too dissimilar to the 'CMPCT' variant of the Yeezy 350 V2), with a sole reminiscent of the Yeezy Qntm.

=== Yeezy 1050 ===
The Adidas Yeezy 1050 was first shown on July 22, 2021, at the Atlanta Mercedes-Benz Stadium during the first listening party for West's 10th studio album, Donda. It was worn along with his other Yeezy apparel. The first colorway is called "Hi-Res" as an orange high-top with boot characteristics. The release date for this item was unknown but was speculated to retail for US$400. Following the termination of the collaboration, this item is no longer likely to release.
