= Dov Charney =

Canadian entrepreneur (born 1969)

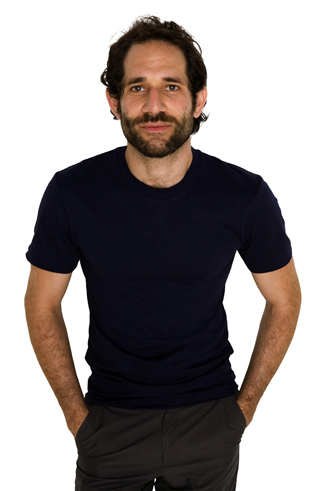
- Dov Charney in 2008
- Born: January 31, 1969 (age 57); Montreal, Quebec, Canada
- Occupation: Businessman
- Relatives: Moshe Safdie (uncle); Oren Safdie (cousin); Benny Safdie (first cousin once removed); Josh Safdie (first cousin once removed)

Dov Charney (born January 31, 1969) is a Canadian entrepreneur and clothing manufacturer. He is the founder of American Apparel, which was one of the largest garment manufacturers in the United States until its bankruptcy in 2015. Charney was fired from American Apparel in 2014 due to allegations of sexual harassment and assault. He subsequently founded Los Angeles Apparel which produces Kanye West's line Yeezy.

Charney is a nephew of architect Moshe Safdie and a cousin once removed from the Safdie brothers.

== Early life ==
Charney was born to a Jewish family in Montreal, Quebec, on January 31, 1969. His father, Morris, an architect, and his mother, Sylvia, an artist of Syrian-Jewish descent, divorced when he was young. Charney is a nephew of architect Moshe Safdie. Charney is dyslexic and was diagnosed with ADD in kindergarten.

He attended Choate Rosemary Hall, a private boarding school in Connecticut and St. George's School of Montreal. According to Charney, he was heavily influenced by both Montreal culture and his own Jewish heritage.

While attending high school in the United States, Charney began importing Hanes and Fruit of the Loom t-shirts from the U.S. to his friends in Canada. In an interview with Vice, he described smuggling the shirts on Amtrak trains from New York to Montreal.

== American Apparel ==
Charney began selling t-shirts under the American Apparel name in 1989. In 1990, he dropped out of Tufts University, borrowed $10,000 from his parents and established American Apparel in South Carolina. Over the next several years, he spent time learning about manufacturing and wholesale before moving to Los Angeles in the mid-'90s. By 1997, Charney had moved all manufacturing into a factory located in downtown Los Angeles. American Apparel products were marketed towards "young metropolitan adults."

The company had about $12 million in sales by 2001. In 2003, Charney opened the first store in L.A.'s Echo Park neighborhood, followed by one each in New York and Montreal. Within two years, the company had expanded to Europe and opened 65 new stores. By 2006, there were 140 total stores.

In 2009, it expanded to 281 total retail locations, making it "the fastest retail roll-out in American history." In 2014, the company reported record sales of $634 million.

=== Ad campaigns ===
American Apparel under Charney's leadership was known for its simple and provocative ads, which rarely used professional models and whom were often chosen personally by Charney from local hangouts and stores. He shot many of the advertisements himself and was criticized for featuring models in sexually provocative poses. The campaigns were also lauded for honesty and lack of airbrushing.

In 2012, the company made headlines with an ad campaign featuring 62-year-old model Jacky O'Shaughnessy.

American Apparel again stirred controversy in 2014 when their Lower East Side store displayed mannequins with pubic hair in the window. The company told Elle Magazine:

American Apparel is a company that celebrates natural beauty, and the Lower East Side Valentine's Day window continues that celebration. We created it to invite passerbys to explore the idea of what is 'sexy' and consider their comfort with the natural female form. This is the same idea behind our advertisements, which avoid many of the photoshopped and airbrushed standards of the fashion industry. So far we have received positive feedback from those that have commented, and we're looking forward to hearing more points of view.

=== Activism ===
==== Legalize LA ====
Legalize LA was an immigration reform campaign conceived by Charney and promoted by American Apparel beginning in 2004. The campaign featured billboards and full-page ads, as well as t-shirts with the words "Legalize LA." Proceeds from the sale of the shirts were donated to immigration reform advocacy groups. The campaign called for the overhaul of immigration laws so as to create a legal path for undocumented workers to gain citizenship in the United States.

==== Legalize Gay ====
In November 2008, after the passing of Proposition 8, which banned same-sex marriages in California, Dov Charney and American Apparel created "Legalize Gay" T-shirts to hand out to protesters at rallies. The positive reaction led American Apparel to sell the same shirts in stores and online.

==== Factory conditions ====
In an interview with Vice.tv, Charney spoke out against the poor treatment of fashion workers in developing countries and refers to the practices as "slave labor" and "death trap manufacturing." Charney proposed a "Global Garment Workers Minimum Wage" and discussed many of the inner workings of the modern fast fashion industry practices that creates dangerous factory conditions and disasters.

Charney's own factories have been heavily scrutinized for labor violations. In 2020,, in the midst of the COVID 19 pandemic, public health officials ordered the shut-down of Los Angeles Apparel due to "flagrant violations of mandatory public health infection control orders." Charney was able to sidestep the initial lockdown measures and keep employees from unemployment benefits by reopening as an essential business making and selling masks. 300 workers were infected with COVID-19, and 4 workers died before the factory was ordered to close.

Workers were also made to sign agreements releasing Charney and American Apparel from all legal claims against him or the company. These claims forced employees to go through mandatory arbitration, an internal process, and prevented lawsuits alleging workplace abuse from entering the public court system.

=== Termination ===
American Apparel publicly suspended Charney on 18 June 2014, stating that they would terminate him for cause in 30 days. The termination letter given to Charney alleged that he had engaged in conduct that repeatedly put himself in a position to be sued by numerous former employees for claims that include harassment, discrimination, and assault.

Paula Schneider, who took over as company CEO, stated that Charney was fired for violating sexual harassment and anti-discrimination policies and for misuse of corporate assets.

Charney was "blindsided" by news of his termination, calling it a "coup." In court filings by his attorneys, it was alleged that the American Apparel CFO had planned to oust Charney, and that he was persuaded to sign a disastrous settlement that left him with no job and no control of the company, despite being the largest shareholder. Charney alleged that the investigation was biased on the grounds that it was conducted by those who benefitted from an outcome that weighed in their favor. Charney asserted that he has never been charged with any crime or found guilty or liable for any of the accusations against him.

In December 2014, Charney was terminated as a chief executive officer after months of suspension. In December 2014, Charney told Bloomberg Businessweek he was down to his last $100,000 and that he was sleeping on a friend's couch in Manhattan. Following his suspension as CEO in the summer of 2014, Charney teamed up with the Standard General hedge fund to buy stocks of the company to attempt a takeover. In 2016, American Apparel's board dismissed a $300 million offer from Hagan Group that pushed for Charney's comeback.

In the wake of his dismissal, reports of Charney's management style emerged. Business Insider stated that Charney was unable to install a mature operational infrastructure to keep the company running smoothly, and didn't establish management bench strength for American Apparel. Andrew Ross Sorkin, writing for the New York Times stated that Charney "should have been gone long ago, face of the brand or not."

== Los Angeles Apparel ==
In 2016, Charney founded Los Angeles Apparel. He opened its first factory in South Central Los Angeles, with aims of replicating the successes he experienced in the 1990s with supplying wholesale clothing. The origins are similar to those he deployed while expanding American Apparel. When interviewed by Vice News regarding his new venture, Charney said, "my previous company had an effect on the culture of young adults ... I want to reconnect and do that again before I die".

The company grew to over 350 staff during the second year of operation. During an interview with Bloomberg, Charney drew comparisons to the growth he experienced with American Apparel calling it the equivalent of "year eight". Charney expected the fashion line to grow to $20 million in revenue by 2018.

Similar to American Apparel, the manufacturing of all Los Angeles Apparel garments are kept in the U.S. to maintain low lead times and offer better completion times than overseas competitors.

Following the outbreak of the COVID-19 pandemic in the United States, Charney repurposed his business operations to help increased demand for PPE (Personal Protective Equipment). According to the Los Angeles Times, Charney spotted shortages as early as February, and this is when his apparel company began to consider manufacturing face masks.

Charney was interviewed in March 2020 by a number of media outlets, speaking about his desire to turn Los Angeles Apparel into a medical equipment manufacturer during the pandemic. Los Angeles Apparel then began manufacturing cloth facemasks and medical gowns at the facility in South Central. Charney told The New York Times that he aimed to create 300,000 masks and 50,000 gowns each week. In an interview, Charney said he was "losing money on the venture," as he was giving many of them away.

In 2020, public health officials ordered the shut-down of Los Angeles Apparel due to "flagrant violations of mandatory public health infection control orders." 300 workers were infected with COVID-19 and 4 workers died before the factory was ordered to close.

The company produces Yeezy, Kanye West's brand, of which Charney is CEO. West, a longtime friend of Charney, owns Yeezy. Items include t-shirts, hoodies, windbreakers, trench coats, shorts, joggers, footwear, and socks.

== Allegations of sexual harassment and assault ==
Charney has been the subject of several sexual harassment lawsuits, at least five since the mid-2000s, including allegations of sexual harassment, sexual assault, racist remarks, and abusive behavior against numerous employees. He has been accused of sexually harassing employees as young as 17. Due to employees signing documents revoking legal claims against Charney or the company, many lawsuits were thrown out by the courts and had to go through internal arbitration at American Apparel.

Charney denied the allegations, accusing lawyers in the lawsuits against American Apparel of extortion. Charney has said numerous times that he sees no problem with sexually pursuing his employees.

In 2004, Claudine Ko of Jane magazine published an essay narrating that Charney began masturbating in front of her while she was interviewing him. The article's publication brought extensive press to Charney. In a follow-up to her first article, Ko wrote that her article had been misconstrued, stating that her encounter with Charney "was being used to feed a flawed cliche where men are evil and omnipotent while women are mute victims lacking free will." She further questioned the notion that she had been taken advantage of: "Who was really exploited? We both were—American Apparel got press, I got one hell of a story. And that's it." Ko has never claimed Charney masturbating in front of her was non-consensual.

== Personal life ==
Charney lives in Garbutt House, a mansion atop a hill in Silver Lake. In 2022, Charney filed for bankruptcy, having owed creditors tens of million of dollars.

== In the media ==
Charney is the subject of Trainwreck: The Cult of American Apparel a 2025 American documentary film directed by Sally Rose Griffiths. It premiered on Netflix on July 1, 2025, as part of the Trainwreck series.
