= Pier59 Studios =

Pier59 Studios is a multimedia fashion studio, located at Chelsea Piers in New York City. At 110,000 square feet, it is considered to be the largest commercial photography/multimedia studio in the world.

The studio was established in 1995 by its founder, Federico Pignatelli, with the goal of transforming the location into the premier studio in Chelsea, Manhattan.
