= Kasper Rørsted =

Danish manager (born 1962)

- Born: 24 February 1962 (age 64); Aarhus, Denmark
- Education: Niels Brock
- Known for: Former CEO of Adidas

Kasper Rørsted (born 24 February 1962) is a Danish business executive who was the CEO of German sportwear firm Adidas from 2016 until November 2022.

== Early life and education ==
During high school, Rørsted played handball for Denmark's national youth team. He went on to study at Niels Brock Copenhagen Business College with further Executive Education at Harvard Business School.

== Career ==
=== Early career ===
In his early career, Rørsted worked with Oracle, Digital Equipment Corporation, and Compaq. From 2001 to 2002, he was managing director of Compaq Enterprise Business Group in EMEA. He moved to the managing director position at HP EMEA from 2002 to 2004. In 2005 he became director at Henkel, become vice chairman in 2007 and CEO in 2008. Under his stewardship, the group's market capitalization quadrupled to more than €36 billion.

In January 2016, it was announced that Kasper would leave the company to become CEO of Adidas, replacing Herbert Hainer. In 2020, the Adidas supervisory board extended his contract until 2026. In 2022, however, Rørsted and the company's supervisory board had mutually agreed that he would hand over his position during the course of 2023. Adidas paid 16 million USD as compensation for his early departure.

== Other activities ==
Rørsted has been a member of several corporate boards and non-profit organizations, including Siemens AG, Nestlé, and European Round Table of Industrialists (ERT).

== Personal life ==
Rørsted is married with four children. The family resides in Munich.
