= Los Angeles Apparel =

American clothing company

Los Angeles Apparel Inc.
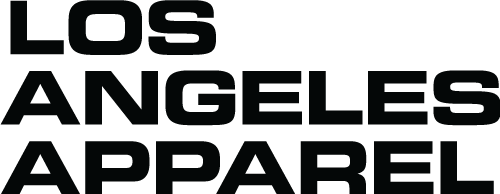
- Type: Private
- Industry: Manufacturing, fashion
- Founded: 2016; 10 years ago Los Angeles, California, U.S.
- Founder: Dov Charney
- Headquarters: Los Angeles, California, U.S.
- Area served: Worldwide
- Key people: Dov Charney (CEO)
- Products: Clothing
- Number of employees: 1,500 (July 2022)
- Website: Official website (Consumer); Imprintable division (Wholesale)

Los Angeles Apparel is an American manufacturer, designer and distributor of clothing based in South-Central Los Angeles. The company was founded in 2016 by Dov Charney, the founder of American Apparel. Los Angeles Apparel is a vertically integrated manufacturer, and currently employs over 1,500 personnel.

== History ==
Los Angeles Apparel was founded by Dov Charney in 2016 in Los Angeles, California, after he was terminated from American Apparel by its board due to numerous allegations including sexual harassment, racism, and sexual assault. Charney rejected a $4.5 million severance package and role as "creative director" in the company and launched Los Angeles Apparel as a wholesale business, similar to American Apparel's origins in 1989.

About 90% of the factory's machinery once belonged to American Apparel. Charney bought fabric, computers, sewing machines, and other equipment from American Apparel in the bankruptcy sale. In late 2016, Cincinnati-based TSC Apparel made a multimillion-dollar business deal with Los Angeles Apparel, selling the startup's clothes to concert producer Live Nation Entertainment and screen printers who previously purchased American Apparel.

In an effort to emphasize the importance of the workers who produce the apparel, their names and faces were printed on the labels of shirts back in 2017.

In 2020, public health officials ordered the shut-down of Los Angeles Apparel due to "flagrant violations of mandatory public health infection control orders." Charney was able to sidestep the initial lockdown measures and keep employees from unemployment benefits by reopening as an essential business making and selling masks. 300 workers were infected with COVID-19 and 4 workers died before the factory was ordered to close.

== Production ==
Los Angeles Apparel was started as a wholesale business. The company is upfront about the fact that its clothing and business model is similar to that of American Apparel. Los Angeles Apparel is a manufacturer and distributor of apparel to screen printers, apparel companies, and boutiques. The company focuses on production of T-shirts, sweatshirts, cotton bodysuits and swimwear.

The company is a vertically integrated manufacturer with knitting and dyeing done in Los Angeles.

Similar to the values held by American Apparel, the corporate identity has a commitment to "sweatshop free" manufacturing.
