= Yeezy Gap =

Former fashion brand

- Type: Clothing
- Inventor: Kanye West and Gap Inc.
- Inception: 2021; 5 years ago
- Manufacturer: Gap
- Available: Defunct
- Last production year: October 2022 (Note: While the contract between West and Gap officially ended on September 15, 2022, Gap continued to sell already produced stock of Yeezy Gap clothing until October 25, 2022.)

Yeezy Gap (stylized as YEEZY GAP or YZY GAP) was a fashion collaboration between Kanye West's Yeezy and the American clothing company Gap announced in June 2020, with its first wave of clothing releasing a year later in June 2021. In January 2022, the brand announced its collaboration with luxury fashion house Balenciaga, with the first collection from that line releasing the following month. Yeezy Gap was terminated two years after its announcement in September 2022 after a series of disagreements between West and Gap executives. West independently released products from the Yeezy Gap line in February 2024, without permission from Gap.

Yeezy Gap was characterized by minimalist and utilitarian design, echoing previous Yeezy collections designed by West. It consisted of "elevated" basic clothing, including hoodies, tracksuits, and jackets. The line was met with generally positive critical and commercial reception, although some criticized the manner in which it was released.

== History ==
=== Inception ===
West had held a deep interest in Gap for years, having worked there as a teen, and declared in a 2015 interview that he wanted to be "the Steve Jobs of the Gap." In 2009, West was set to collaborate with Gap, but the collaboration fell through. According to West, he "couldn't get past the politics." In June 2020, West took to Twitter to announce the Yeezy Gap collaboration, with Gap stock rising 36% after the announcement. In a statement, Gap said that the Yeezy Gap line will create "modern, elevated basics for men, women and kids at accessible price points." West and Gap agreed to a 10-year deal, with the option to renew after five years. The deal contained the ability for West to acquire up to 8.5 million common stock shares of Gap depending on sales performance, along with royalties for sales.

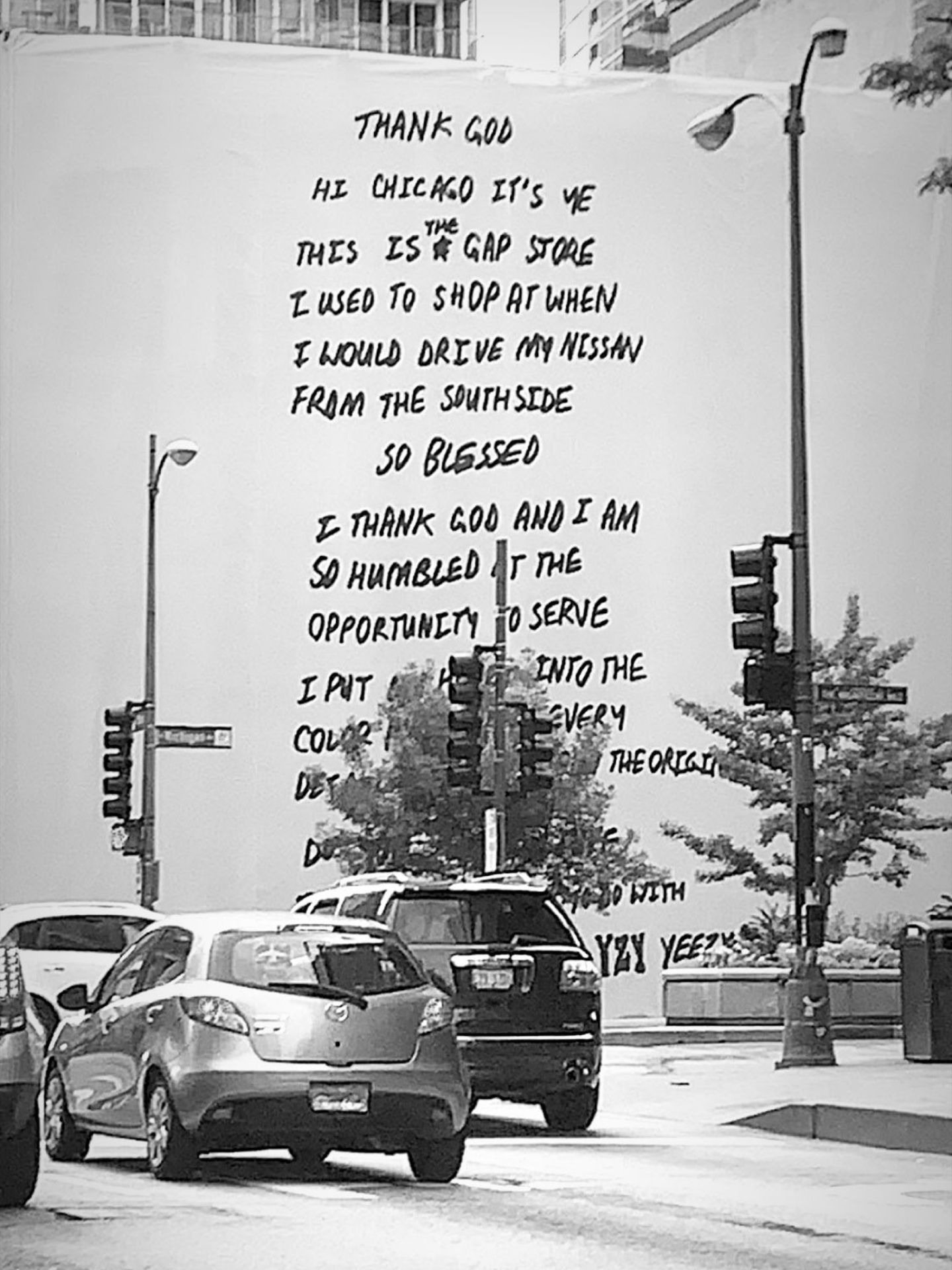
Banner displayed over a Gap store building in promotion of Yeezy Gap

Later in June, a retail Gap store in Chicago had its exterior redesigned to promote the collaboration. Mowalola Ogunlesi was announced to lead the design team in July.

=== Release ===
==== First Wave ====
The first piece from the collaboration, a blue zipperless puffer jacket made from recycled nylon, was released on June 8, 2021, coinciding with West's birthday. In September of that same year, the second item was released: a double-layered hoodie made from heavyweight cotton, dubbed the "Perfect Hoodie." The music video for the song "Heaven and Hell" from West's 2021 album Donda doubled as a commercial for the hoodie. Gap later reported that the Yeezy Gap hoodie set a record for the most online sales of a single item in a day in the company's history. They also stated that 70 percent of customers who purchased the item were new to the brand.

==== Yeezy Gap Engineered by Balenciaga ====
In January 2022, the "Yeezy Gap Engineered by Balenciaga" project was announced. It was set to be a collaboration between West and luxury fashion house Balenciaga. Like other Yeezy Gap releases, the first previews of products from the collection were revealed alongside a studio album from West, Donda 2. In late February, the first pieces from the line were released, as well as a lookbook showcasing the full collection. The release included T-shirts, hoodies, jackets, and jeans.

The second collection from the collaboration was set for release on May 25, however, it was postponed until May 27 due to the Robb Elementary School shooting. It contained accessories such as bags and hats alongside regular clothing.

==== Retail stores ====
In July 2022, Yeezy Gap products were made available for purchase in a retail location for the first time in the Times Square Gap store, later coming to select Gap locations across the United States. The clothes were displayed in unsorted trash bags, forcing customers to dig through them to find what they wanted, causing large social media backlash. West stated in a post on Instagram that the homeless were one of his biggest inspirations in design, which also led to criticism for "fetishizing" homelessness. West later defended the clothing displays, stating that it was part of his artistic vision.

=== Termination ===
In August 2022, West began taking to Instagram to share his issues with working with Gap. He frequently complained about the company holding meetings without him, copying his designs for Gap's own releases, and disagreements on how Yeezy Gap should be run. On September 12, West stated in an interview that he intended to end his partnership with Gap, saying "It’s time for me to go it alone." Three days later, on September 15, Yeezy notified Gap that it had violated its contract by failing to meet its obligations, specifically for not opening up dedicated Yeezy Gap retail stores. Gap CEO Mark Breitbard confirmed in a memo to employees that they would slow down the partnership, but that they still planned to work through their Yeezy product pipeline. However, on October 25, after a series of antisemitic remarks from West, Gap stated that it would stop selling Yeezy Gap products, forgoing its plan to offload remaining stock after the end of its contract.

=== Independent release ===
On February 22, 2024, West released several items from the collaboration on his yeezy.com website in Europe and Asia, seemingly without permission from Gap. The items were sold for USD$20, lower than typical Yeezy Gap prices. On the same day, he premiered a Super Bowl advertisement for the website, which was a low budget phone recording of West speaking in his car.
